= Guianan savanna =

South American ecoregion

Guianan savanna (NT0707)
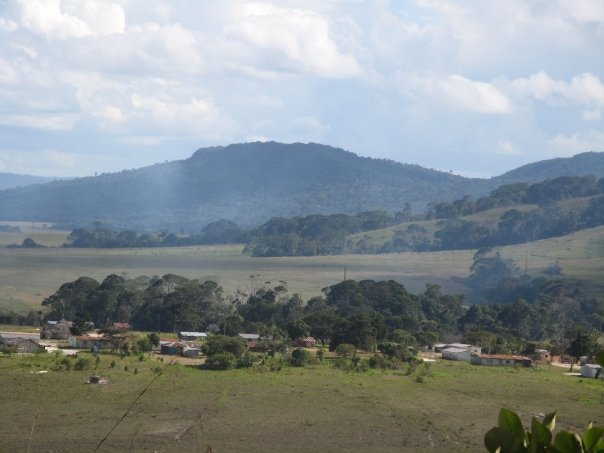
- Savanna in the Canaima National Park

- Location in northern South America

Ecology
- Realm: Neotropical
- Biome: tropical and subtropical grasslands, savannas, and shrublands

Geography
- Area: 104,376.52 km^{2} (40,300.00 mi^{2})
- Countries: Venezuela; Brazil; Guyana; Suriname
- Coordinates: 4.035°N 60.368°W

Conservation
- Protected: 50.35%

The Guianan savanna (NT0707) is an ecoregion in the south of Venezuela, Guyana and Suriname and the north of Brazil. It is in the Amazon biome. The savanna covers an area of rolling upland plains on the Guiana Shield between the Amazon and Orinoco basins. It includes forested areas, but these are shrinking steadily due to the effect of frequent fires, either accidental or deliberate. The ecoregion includes the Gran Sabana region of Venezuela.

== Location ==
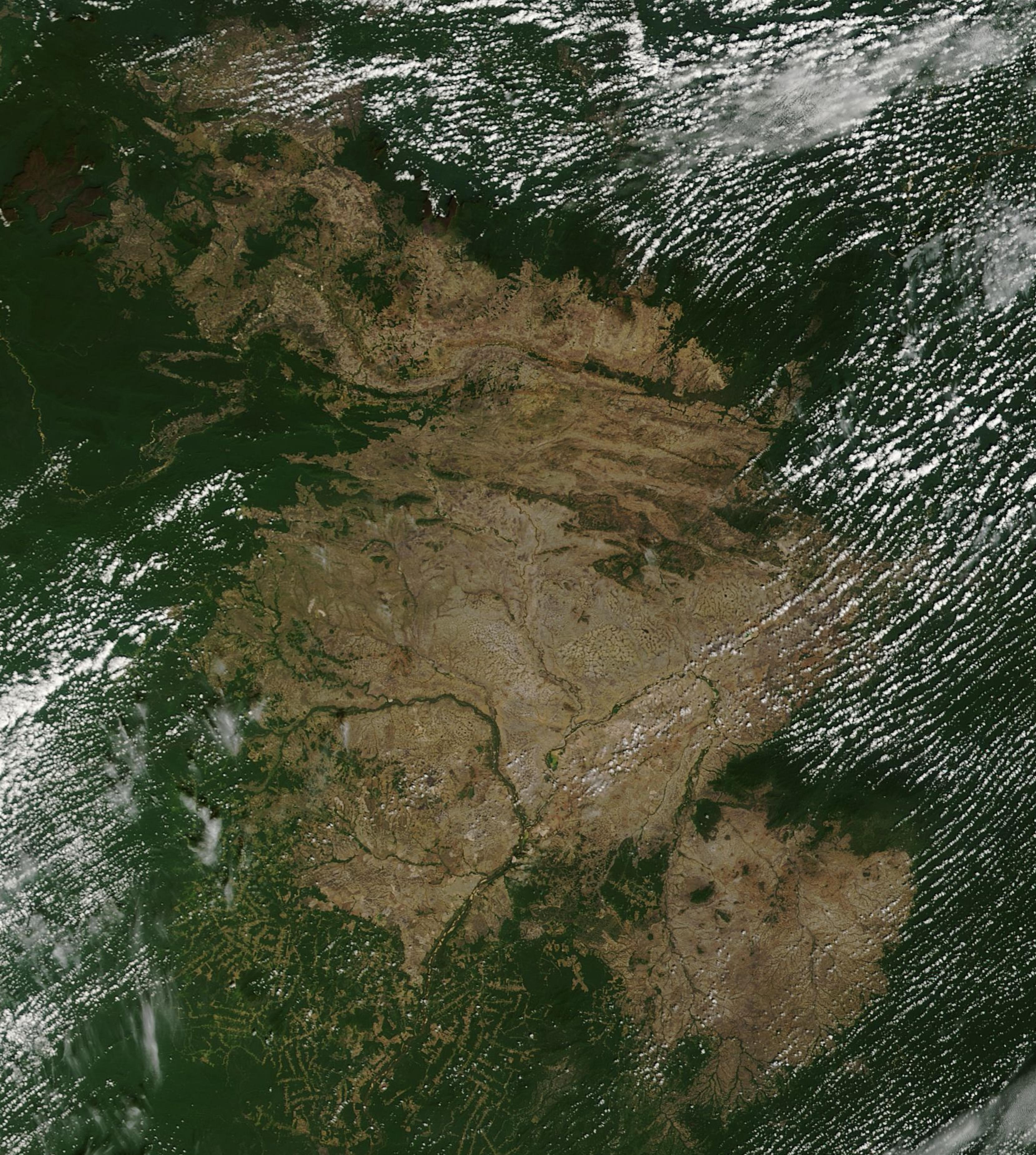
Satellite picture of the main section

The ecoregion includes three large unconnected areas totaling 10,437,652 hectares (25,792,000 acres). The main section is in southeast Venezuela, the Brazilian state of Roraima and western Guyana. To the southeast a smaller section is in the north of the Brazilian state of Pará extending into the south of Suriname. The most eastern and smallest section is in the Brazilian state of Amapá, stretching north from Macapá. There are small isolated fragments to the north of the main section in the Pakarima foothills in Guyana. The main section includes the Gran Sabana region of Venezuela.

All three sections adjoin the Uatuma-Trombetas moist forests ecoregion to the south. The most eastern section adjoins the Marajó várzea to the east, at the mouth of the Amazon River. The Guianan moist forests ecoregion lies to the east of the main section and to the north of the other two sections. The main section adjoins the Guianan piedmont and lowland moist forests ecoregion to the west. The northern part of the main section adjoins areas of the Guianan Highlands moist forest and Pantepuis ecoregions.

== Physical ==
The grasslands are between the basins of the Amazon and Orinoco rivers. This ecoregion covers gently rolling upland plains of the Roraima formation, sediments that overlay the ancient Guiana Shield basement from the Precambrian era. Soils are typically highly weathered oxisols that are low in organic matter and nutrients and often high in toxic compounds of aluminum. The north part of the main section of the ecoregion is in the eastern Orinoco basin, and is drained by the upper Caroní River, known as the Kuquenán, the Yuruaní River and the Arabopó River. The south and east parts of the main section are in the Branco River basin. The rivers are blackwater rivers, acidic and very low in nutrients.

== Climate ==
The Köppen climate classification is "Am": equatorial, monsoonal. Temperatures are relatively stable throughout the year, slightly cooler in July and slightly warmer in November. Average temperatures range from a minimum of 21.5 °C (70.7 °F) to a maximum of 31 °C (88 °F) with a mean temperature of 26 °C (79 °F). Annual rainfall averages about 2,000 millimetres (79 in). Average monthly rainfall varies from 55.3 millimetres (2.18 in) in November to 376.2 millimetres (14.81 in) in June. There are NE and SE trade winds during most of the year. Relative air humidity is generally high, with mean annual levels of 75–85%.

== Ecology ==
The Guianan savanna ecoregion is in the Neotropical realm and the tropical and subtropical grasslands, savannas, and shrublands biome.

=== Flora ===
The Guianan savanna ecoregion contains relatively intact grasslands within an area of tropical rainforest and sandstone tepuis. The Guianan savanna contains the Gran Sabana mosaic of grasslands and tree patches. There are continuous forests at the base of the tepuis, and patches of forest or of shrubs in other places surrounded by broad areas of grassland that are usually free of shrubs or trees. Some areas have shrubby meadows. The streams that cross the region run through gallery forests. There is a low level of endemism compared to the Guianan Tepuis. However, the ecoregion is important as a plant refuge and center for plant dispersal. 204 species have been recorded in the Venezuelan Sierra de Lema and Cerro Venamo, including endemic species in swamps in the open savanna, on dry rocky land and in the forests at different levels.

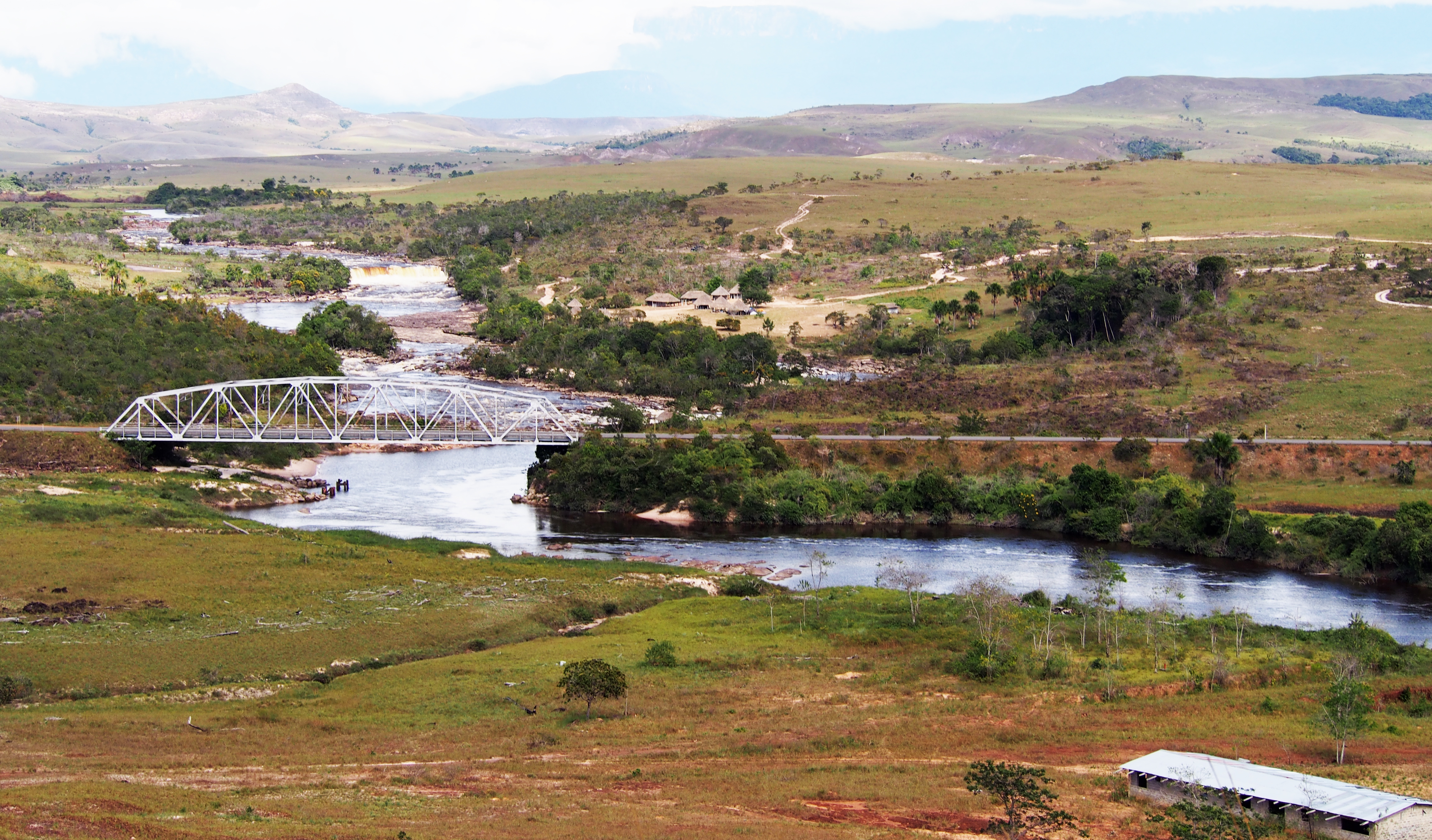
Yuruaní River

Common species in the scrublands are Euphorbia guianensis, Humiria balsamifera, Clusia species Calliandra species Chamaecrista species, Bonnetia sessilis, Myrcia species, and Ternstroemia pungens. Common species in the open savannas are Axonopus pruinosus, Axonopus kaietukensis, Trachypogon plumosus, Echinolaena inflexa, Bulbostylis paradoxa, Rhynchospora globosa and Hypolytrum pulchrum. Common species in the palm savannas are Hypogynium virgatum, Andropogon species, Panicum species, Byttneria genistella, Miconia stephananthera, Mahurea exstiputata and Mauritia flexuosa. Common species in the meadows are Chalepophyllum guianense, Digomphia laurifolia, Tococa nitens and Poecilandra retusa.

=== Fauna ===
Most of the endemic birds of the Guianan highland are found in the Gran Sabana, in the humid forest on the foothills above 600 metres (2,000 ft). They include the tepui swift (Streptoprocne phelpsi), tepui goldenthroat (Polytmus milleri) and tepui wren (Troglodytes rufulus). Endangered birds include the sun parakeet (Aratinga solstitialis), Rio Branco antbird (Cercomacra carbonaria), yellow-bellied seedeater (Sporophila nigricollis) and hoary-throated spinetail (Synallaxis kollari).

Endangered mammals include the black bearded saki (Chiropotes satanas) and giant otter (Pteronura brasiliensis). There are relatively few endemic frogs when compared to the tepuis. Most endemic species are found in the La Escalera forest, and include Anomaloglossus parkerae, Stefania scalae, Scinax danae, Tepuihyla rodriguezi, and Pristimantis pulvinatus. Rodriguez's Amazon tree frog (Tepuihyla rodriguezi) is found in savannas and some tepuis. Scinax exiguus and Leptodactylus sabanensis are found only in savannas.

== Status ==
The World Wildlife Fund gives the ecoregion the status of "Vulnerable". The savanna is replacing the forests as a result of frequent fires and the poor soils. This is causing some of the small streams to become intermittent in the dry season, affecting the amphibians. The smoke from the fires may be creating a greenhouse effect, intensifying the heat and damage caused by the fires. Gold and diamond mining cause mercury pollution.

50.35% of the ecoregion is in protected areas. The Venezuelan Gran Sabana is contained in the 30,000 square kilometres (12,000 sq mi) Canaima National Park. Other parts of the ecoregion are protected by the 1,160 square kilometres (450 sq mi) Monte Roraima National Park in Brazil and the Tumucumaque Mountains National Park. The Sipaliwini Savanna in Suriname borders and is an extension of the Tumucumaque National Park. It is a 1,000 square kilometres (390 sq mi) protected area since 1972. The 13,000 square kilometres (5,000 sq mi) Rupununi savannah in Guyana does not have an official protected area status as of 2020.

== Sources ==
- Bonaccorso, Elisa, South America: Northern Brazil, Guyana, and Venezuela (NT0707), WWF: World Wildlife Fund
- "Guianan savanna", Global Species, Myers Enterprises II
- WildFinder, WWF: World Wildlife Fund
