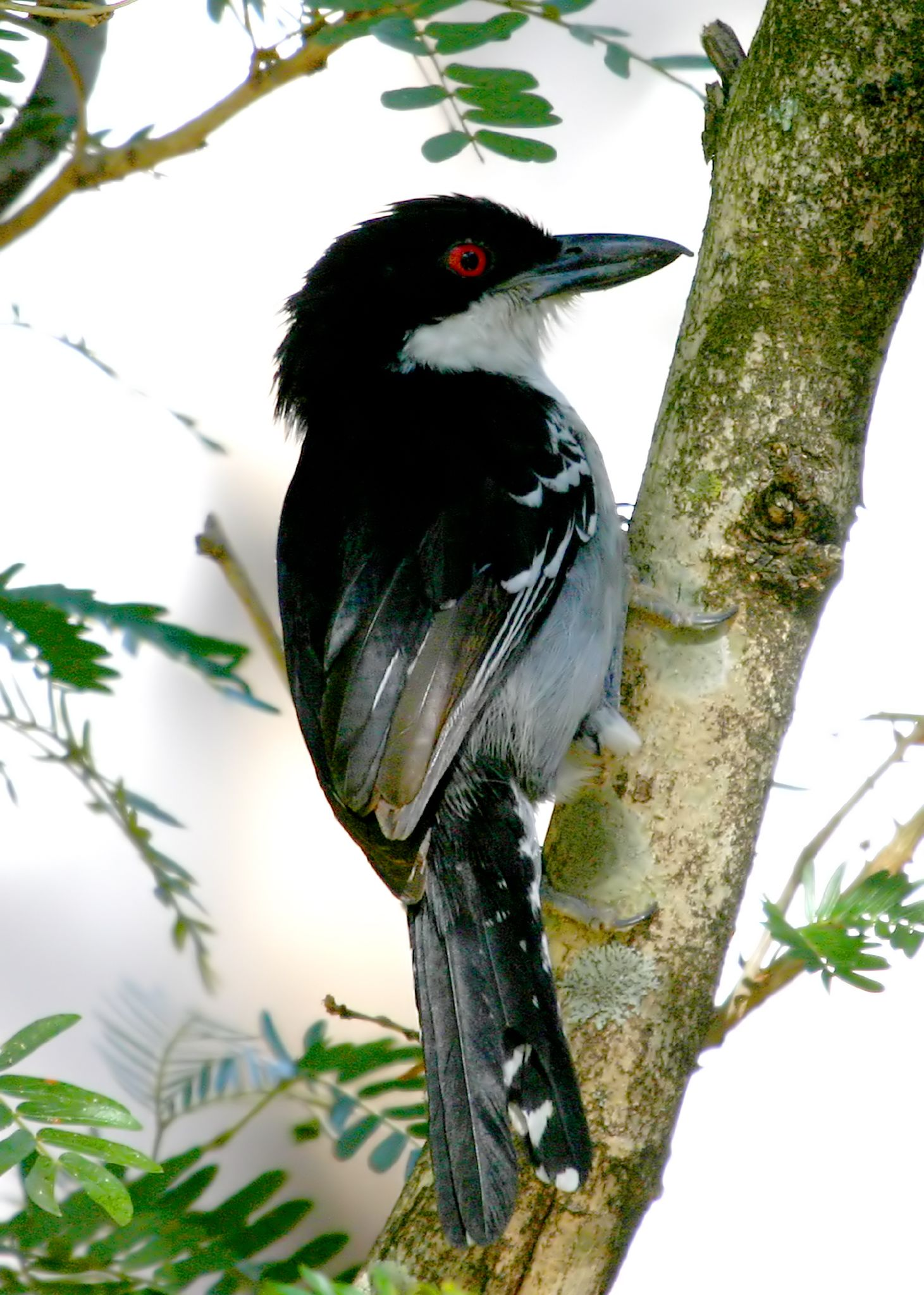
- Male at Alto Paraíso de Goiás, Goiás State, Brazil
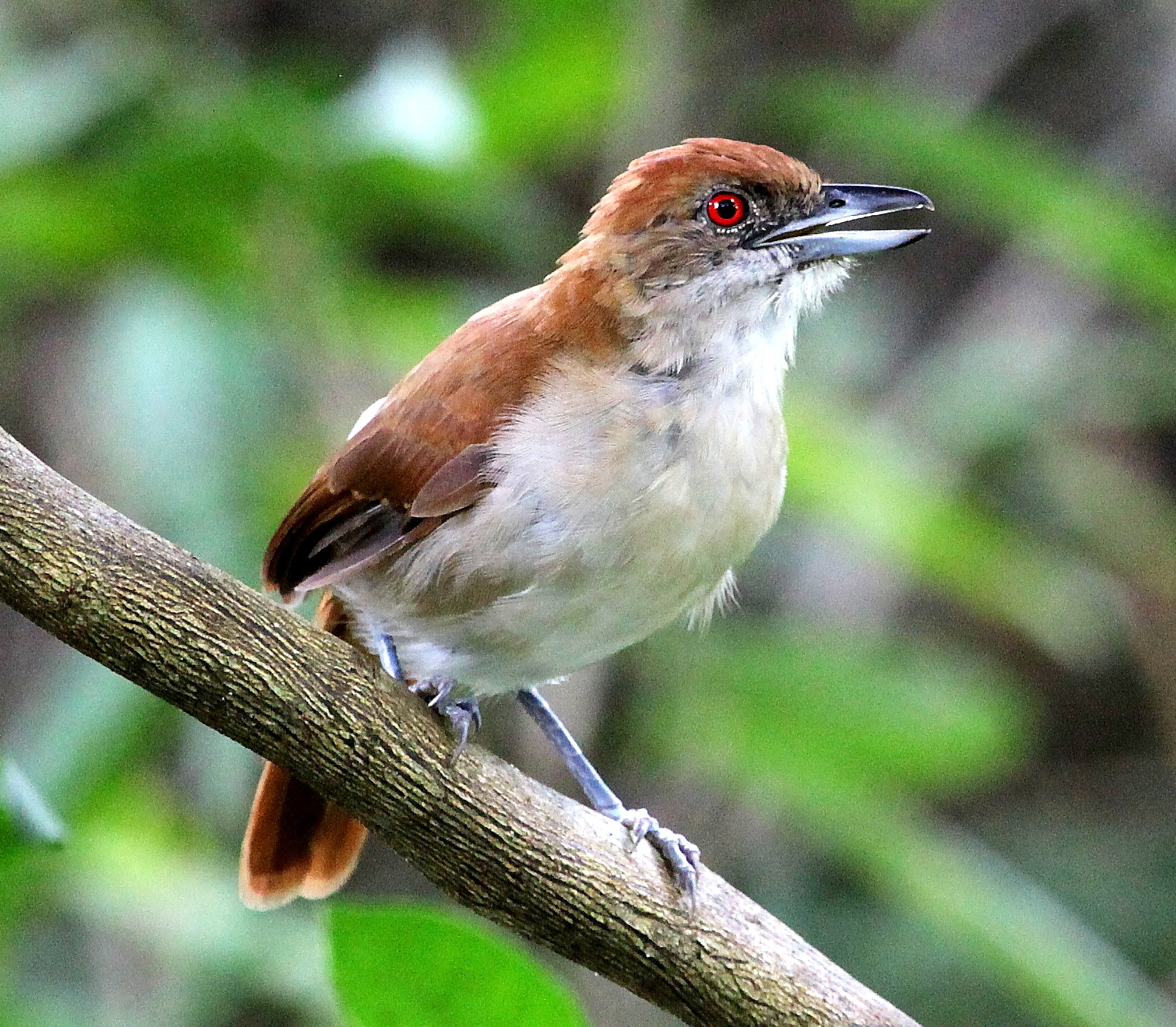
- Female at Bonito, Mato Grosso do Sul State, Brazil

Conservation status
- Least Concern (IUCN 3.1)

Scientific classification
- Kingdom: Animalia
- Phylum: Chordata
- Class: Aves
- Order: Passeriformes
- Family: Thamnophilidae
- Genus: Taraba; Lesson, 1831
- Species: T. major

Binomial name
- Taraba major (Vieillot, 1816)

= Great antshrike =

Species of bird

The great antshrike (Taraba major) is a passerine bird in subfamily Thamnophilinae of family Thamnophilidae, the "typical antbirds". It is found in southern Mexico, in every Central American country except El Salvador, on Trinidad, and in every mainland South American country except Chile, though only as a vagrant in Uruguay.

== Taxonomy and systematics ==
The great antshrike was described by the French ornithologist Louis Pierre Vieillot in 1816 and given the binomial name Thamnophilus major. The current genus Taraba was introduced by the French naturalist René Lesson in 1831.

The great antshrike has these ten subspecies:

- T. m. melanocrissus (Sclater, PL, 1860)
- T. m. obscurus Zimmer, JT, 1933
- T. m. transandeanus (Sclater, PL, 1855)
- T. m. granadensis (Cabanis, 1872)
- T. m. semifasciatus (Cabanis, 1872)
- T. m. duidae Chapman, 1929
- T. m. melanurus (Sclater, PL, 1855)
- T. m. borbae (Pelzeln, 1868)
- T. m. stagurus (Lichtenstein, MHC, 1823)
- T. m. major (Vieillot, 1816)

The great antshrike is the only member of genus Taraba. Its closest relatives appear to be the fasciated and bamboo antshrikes of genus Cymbilaimus. The subspecies' vocalizations fall into two groups, T. m. melanocrissus through T. m. granadensis and T. m. semifasciatus through T. m. major. The first, found in Central America and mostly west of the Andes, may represent a separate species from the other, which are found east of the Andes. In addition, differences within the members of each group may not be significant enough in some cases to warrant subspecies status.

== Description ==
The great antshrike is a large and distinctive bird, 19 to 20 cm (7.5 to 7.9 in) long and weighing 47.5 to 70 g (1.7 to 2.5 oz). The species exhibits significant sexual dimorphism, though both sexes of all subspecies have a large crest, a red iris, and a heavy black bill with a hook at the end like true shrikes. Adult males of the nominate subspecies T. m. major have a black head with the color extending to below the eye. Their upperparts are mostly black with a usually hidden white patch between the scapulars. Their wings are black with large white spots on the coverts that appear as bars when perched and white edges on the primaries. Their tail is black with white spots on the outer feathers. Their throat, chin, and the rest of their underparts are white with a gray tinge on the flanks. Adult females have a rufous crown and browner lores and ear coverts. Their upperparts are reddish yellow-brown, their wings reddish yellow-brown with paler feather edges, and their tail is rufous. Their chin, throat, and center of their breast are white; their crissum is light cinnamon, and the rest of their underparts are white with a cinnamon tinge. Juveniles have cinnamon or buff barring on their upper- and underparts that remains faintly in subadults.

The other subspecies of the great antshrike differ from the nominate and each other thus:

- T. m. melanocrissus: black on male's face extends lower and male's crissum is black
- T. m. obscurus: males like melanocrissus but with white tips on the crissum feathers; females more richly colored
- T. m. transandeanus: males like obscurus but with more white on the crissum; females even more richly colored
- T. m. granadensis: black on male's face similar to nominate and much white on the black crissum; females similar to transandeanus
- T. m. stagurus: males have the most white on the primaries and tail and least gray on the underparts of all subspecies; females are the palest of all
- T. m. semifasciatus: males have a little less white on the primaries and tail than stagurus and a deeper gray crissum than nominate
- T. m. duidae: males resemble semifasciatus with a little more white; female is darker than most with faint blackish streaks and bars on the underparts
- T. m. melanurus: males have an all black tail, white flanks, and white crissum
- T. m. borbae: males have a moderate amount of white on wings and tail and a light gray crissum

== Distribution and habitat ==
The subspecies of the great antshrike are distributed thus:

- T. m. melanocrissus: from northern Oaxaca and southern Veracruz in Mexico south on the Caribbean slope through Belize, Guatemala, Honduras, Nicaragua, and Costa Rica into western Panama
- T. m. obscurus: on Pacific slope from western Costa Rica south through Panama into Colombia's Cauca River valley and along most of Colombia's Pacific slope
- T. m. transandeanus: from Nariño Department in far southwestern Colombia south through western Ecuador into far northwestern Peru's Department of Tumbes
- T. m. granadensis: northern and central Colombia from Córdoba Department south to Meta Department and east into northwestern Venezuela as far as Miranda state
- T. m. semifasciatus: Trinidad, Vichada Department in far eastern Colombia, northern and central Venezuela, the Guianas, and Brazil east of the Negro River to the Atlantic and south to northern Mato Grosso and northwestern Goiás
- T. m. duidae: Venezuela's Cerro de la Neblina in Amazonas and Cerro Jaua in Bolívar
- T. m. melanurus: southeastern Colombia south through eastern Ecuador into eastern Peru and east into Brazil south of the Amazon to the middle reaches of the Purus River
- T. m. borbae: Brazil in eastern Amazonas and far northern Rondônia states
- T. m. stagurus: eastern and northeastern Brazil roughly bounded by eastern Maranhão, Pernambuco, eastern Minas Gerais, and Espírito Santo
- T. m. major: northern and eastern Bolivia, Brazil from southern Mato Grosso to western Minas Gerais, Mato Grosso do Sul, and western São Paulo states, and northern Argentina south to northern Buenos Aires Province

The South American Classification Committee of the American Ornithological Society has records of vagrant individuals in Uruguay.

The great antshrike inhabits a wide range of semi-humid to humid tropical zone landscapes, favoring in most of them areas of dense understorey vegetation. On the Pacific slope it does extend somewhat into the subtropical zone. The landscapes include gallery forest, savanna woodlands, younger secondary forest, the edges and clearings of evergreen forest, river islands, and locally drier but not arid areas. It is often associated with stands of bamboo. The exception to these general habitats is subspecies T. m. stagurus, which occurs in deciduous forest and taller parts of the caatinga. In elevation it occurs below 1,000 m (3,300 ft) in much of its range, but reaching 1,100 m (3,600 ft) in Costa Rica, 1,400 m (4,600 ft) in Colombia, 1,500 m (4,900 ft) in Peru, and 2,200 m (7,200 ft) in Venezuela. It seldom exceeds 750 m (2,500 ft) in northern Central America.

== Behavior ==
=== Movement ===
The great antshrike is presumed to be a year-round resident in most of its range though some seasonal movements are suspected in Argentina.

=== Feeding ===
Great antshrike feeding on an egg in Belo Horizonte, Brazil

The great antshrike feeds on a wide variety of largish insects and other arthropods, small molluscs, small vertebrates including mammals, lizards, and minnows, and a small amount of vegetable matter. Its diet appears to vary considerably across its range. It forages singly or in pairs, almost always within about 5 m (15 ft) of the ground in heavy cover. It hops sluggishly from branch to branch, gleaning prey from leaves, stems, and branches by reaching and sometimes jumping from a perch. It often drops to the ground to seize prey. In the Brazilian Pantanal it has been observed feeding on aquatic prey while standing on water hyacinths. It sometimes joins mixed-species feeding flocks (though almost never does so in Venezuela) and occasionally follows army ant swarms./

=== Breeding ===
The great antshrike's breeding season varies geographically, spanning April to July in Costa Rica, March to July in Trinidad, January to June in Suriname, January to April in northeastern Brazil, and October to December in Argentina. Its nest is a cup made from a variety of plant fibers whose composition varies by habitat. It is typically suspended by its rim in a branch fork or between two branches and usually within about 3 m (10 ft) of the ground. The clutch is usually two or three eggs; three are more common in the southern part of the species' range. The eggs' color and pattern vary geographically though generally they have a creamy white to pale buff base. Both sexes incubate the clutch during the day and the female alone at night. In Costa Rica the incubation period is 17 to 18 days and fledging occurs 12 to 13 days after hatch. These periods elsewhere and other details of parental care are not known. Shiny cowbirds (Molothrus bonariensis) are frequent nest parasites in Argentina.

=== Vocalization ===
The great antshrike's song is generally "a long, accelerating series of c. 40 notes, 5–14 seconds, usually ending in a snarl", though the more northern and western subspecies tend to sing fewer notes and often omit the snarl. Its calls also vary geographically and include a "long decelerating rattle sometimes ending with a distinct note, shorter rattles often repeated rapidly, a decelerating rolling series of whistles, evenly paced series of harsh notes and of more musical notes, downslurred growl, and somewhat clear, high-pitched whine". Because the species favors dense understorey, it is more often heard than seen.

== Status ==
The IUCN has assessed the great antshrike as being of Least Concern. It has an extremely large range and an estimated population of at least five million mature individuals, though the latter is believed to be decreasing. No immediate threats have been identified. It is considered fairly common in most of its range and occurs in several protected areas. Except for subspecies T. m. stagurus its "preference for a variety of edge and second-growth habitats makes it a low-sensitivity species". T. f. stagurus "is reliant on threatened deciduous forest and tall caatinga habitats".
