= Stefania oculosa =

Conservation status
- Vulnerable (IUCN 3.1)

Scientific classification
- Kingdom: Animalia
- Phylum: Chordata
- Class: Amphibia
- Order: Anura
- Family: Hemiphractidae
- Genus: Stefania
- Species: S. oculosa

Binomial name
- Stefania oculosa Señaris, Ayarzagüena, and Gorzula, 1997

Species of frog

Stefania oculosa (common name in Spanish: rana stefania de ojos grandes) is a species of frog in the family Hemiphractidae. It is endemic to the Bolívar state of southern Venezuela and only known from Cerro Jaua, a tepui; it possibly occurs in Brazil as well.

== Habitat ==
It was found on rocks in a fast-flowing cascading stream where it co-occurred with Boana rhythmica, Stefania percristata, and B. tepuiana. The slopes where the frog lives have medium-height forest with thick understory. The known range is within the Jaua-Sarisariñama National Park, and the species is not facing known threats.

== Reproduction ==
The female frogs carry their eggs on their backs. This animal hatches out of its egg as a small froglet with no free-swimming tadpole stage.

== Threats ==
The IUCN classifies this frog as vulnerable to extinction and the Venezuelan Fauna Red List classifies it as near threatened. Climate change could harm this frog by changing the water in the air and the plants. Viral, bacterial, and fungal pathogens could also hurt this frog.

Scientists recommend germplasm banking and captive breeding programs.
