= Anomaloglossus ayarzaguenai =

Conservation status
- Vulnerable (IUCN 3.1)

Scientific classification
- Kingdom: Animalia
- Phylum: Chordata
- Class: Amphibia
- Order: Anura
- Family: Aromobatidae
- Genus: Anomaloglossus
- Species: A. ayarzaguenai

Binomial name
- Anomaloglossus ayarzaguenai (La Marca, 1996)

Synonyms
- Colostethus ayarzaguenai La Marca, 1996

Species of frog

Anomaloglossus ayarzaguenai (in Spanish: sapito ninera de Ayarzaguena) is a species of frog in the family Aromobatidae. It is endemic to Venezuela where it is known from Cerro Jaua in Bolívar state.

== Habitat ==
It is common on the top of this tepui where it is found on the margins of streams and in the surrounding forest. The type locality is approximately 1600 meters above sea level.

The only known population's home is in a protected area; formerly in Jaua-Sarisariñama National Park the habitat in question and the rest of Jaua-Sarisariñama was included within a new national park Caura National Park in 2017.

== Threats ==
The IUCN classifies this frog as vulnerable to extinction. Climate change poses a threat in that it could affect reproductive viability and cause loss of vegetation in the frog's habitat. Emerging viral, bacterial, and fungal diseases could also affect this species.
