= Caura =

Caura may refer to:

- Caura (bug), a genus of insect in the subfamily Pentatominae
- Caura, Trinidad and Tobago, a town in Trinidad and Tobago
- Caura antbird, a bird from South America
- Caura National Park, Venezuela
- Caura River (disambiguation), various rivers
