= Riolama =

Scientific classification
- Kingdom: Animalia
- Phylum: Chordata
- Class: Reptilia
- Order: Squamata
- Family: Gymnophthalmidae
- Subfamily: Riolaminae
- Genus: Riolama; Uzzell, 1973

Type species
- Prionodactylus leucostictus Boulenger, 1900

Diversity
- 6 species (see text)

Genus of lizards

Riolama is a small genus of lizards in the family Gymnophthalmidae.

== Geographic range ==
The genus Riolama found in Venezuela and Brazil.

== Species ==
The genus Riolama contains 6 species:

- Riolama grandis Recoder, Prates, Marques-Souza, Camacho, Sales-Nunes, Vechio, Ghellere, McDiarmid, & Rodrigues, 2020
- Riolama inopinata Kok, 2015
- Riolama leucosticta (Boulenger, 1900) - white-spotted riolama
- Riolama luridiventris Esqueda, La Marca & Praderio, 2004
- Riolama stellata Recoder, Prates, Marques-Souza, Camacho, Sales-Nunes, Vechio, Ghellere, McDiarmid, & Rodrigues, 2020
- Riolama uzzelli Molina & Señaris, 2003

Nota bene: A binomial authority in parentheses indicates that the species was originally described in a genus other than Riolama.

Relatives of the Riolama, nicknamed "The Night Sky" and "The Brown Giant" were discovered by scientists in the Pico da Neblina National Park, Brazil in 2018.
