= Enrique La Marca =

Venezuelan professor and herpetologist

- Born: Francisco Enrique La Marca Gutiérrez; August 11, 1957 (age 69); Barinas, Barinas, Venezuela
- Education: University of the Andes (Venezuela), University of Colorado Boulder, University of Nebraska–Lincoln
- Known for: Describing 42 new species of amphibians and reptiles; studies of Venezuelan herpetofauna
- Scientific career
- Fields: Herpetology, Ecology
- Workplaces: University of the Andes (Venezuela)
- Doctoral advisor: Guillermo Sarmiento, John D. Lynch
- Author abbrev. (zoology): La Marca

Francisco Enrique La Marca Gutiérrez (born 11 August 1957) is a Venezuelan herpetologist and tropical ecologist.

== Biography ==
He is the son of Vincenzo La Marca Zirini (b. 1926 in Noto, Sicily, Italy) and María Eduvina Gutiérrez. He was a disciple of Hobart M. Smith (University of Colorado Boulder) and John D. Lynch (University of Nebraska–Lincoln).

He has worked in teaching (professor of Biogeography) and in research (Curator of the Collection of Amphibians and Reptiles, Laboratory of Biogeography, School of Geography), at the University of the Andes, in Mérida, Venezuela.

He is a retired full professor at the University of the Andes (ULA), dedicated for more than 40 years to the study of Venezuelan herpetofauna. He is the taxonomic author of species in the class Amphibia (order Anura) and in the class Reptilia (orders Sauria and Serpentes). He has described 42 new species of amphibians and reptiles.

His scientific output includes six books and more than 200 articles, most of them published in specialized journals. He has traveled to twenty-three countries with field explorations in fifteen of them, in South, Central, and North America, as well as Europe and Africa. He studied biology at ULA (Mérida, Venezuela) and at the University of Colorado (Boulder, CO, USA, under the supervision of Dr. Hobart Smith); earned a master's degree in Systematics and Biogeography at the University of Nebraska–Lincoln (Lincoln, NE, USA, under Dr. John D. Lynch); and later obtained a doctorate in Tropical Ecology at ULA (under Drs. Guillermo Sarmiento and John D. Lynch).

He has been assistant curator at the Museum of Zoology of the University of Colorado, Boulder; president of the Biogeos Foundation for the Study of Biological Diversity; Chief Coordinator of the ULABG Biogeography Laboratory; founding editor-in-chief of the journal Herpetotropicos; head of the Department of Physical Geography and acting director of the School of Geography in the Faculty of Forest and Environmental Sciences at ULA. He currently directs the REVA Conservation Center (Rescue of Venezuelan Amphibian Species). He is a member of the Amphibian Specialist Group of the International Union for Conservation of Nature (IUCN).

== Honors ==
He has received various recognitions in different programs for research and teaching promotion by Venezuelan institutions such as the Fondo Nacional de Investigaciones Científicas y Tecnológicas (FONACIT) and the University of the Andes, Mérida: Programa de Promoción del Investigador (PPI), Programa de Estímulo al Investigador (PEI), Comisión Nacional para el Beneficio Académico (CONABA), and the Comisión Nacional de Desarrollo de la Educación Superior (CONADES).

== Eponymous taxa ==
- Mannophryne lamarcai Mijares-Urrutia & Arends, 1999

== Taxa described ==
- Anadia pariaensis
- Anomaloglossus ayarzaguenai
- Anomaloglossus guanayensis
- Anomaloglossus murisipanensis
- Anomaloglossus parimae
- Anomaloglossus praderioi
- Anomaloglossus roraima
- Anomaloglossus tepuyensis
- Aromobates molinarii
- Atelopus chrysocorallus
- Atelopus sorianoi
- Atelopus tamaense
- Atractus eriki
- Atractus meridensis
- Atractus micheleae
- Atractus mijaresi
- Atractus ochrosetrus
- Atractus tamaensis
- Liophis dorsocorallinus
- Mannophryne
- Mannophryne cordilleriana
- Mannophryne yustizi
- Nephelobates
- Pristimantis colostichos
- Pristimantis culatensis
- Pristimantis flabellidiscus
- Pristimantis jabonensis
- Pristimantis kareliae
- Pristimantis pedimontanus
- Pristimantis rhigophilus
- Pristimantis riveroi
- Pristimantis telefericus
- Pristimantis thyellus
- Pristimantis vanadise
- Riolama luridiventris
- Scinax flavidus
- Tepuihyla celsae
