= Jaua =

Jaua may refer to:

- Cerro Jaua, Venezuela
- Elías Jaua (born 1969), Venezuelan politician
