= Boana rhythmica =

Conservation status
- Near Threatened (IUCN 3.1)

Scientific classification
- Kingdom: Animalia
- Phylum: Chordata
- Class: Amphibia
- Order: Anura
- Family: Hylidae
- Genus: Boana
- Species: B. rhythmica

Binomial name
- Boana rhythmica (Señaris and Ayarzagüena, 2002)

Synonyms
- Hyla rhythmicus Señaris and Ayarzagüena, 2002; Hypsiboas rhythmicus (Señaris and Ayarzagüena, 2002)

Species of frog

Boana rhythmica is a species of frog in the family Hylidae. It is endemic to Venezuela and only known from its type locality, Cerro Jaua in Bolívar State. It occurs along streams on the slopes of the tepui. It is a nocturnal species found on branches of vegetation 0.3–1 m (1–3 ft) above the ground. The tepui is within the Jaua-Sarisariñama National Park, and changes in long term temperature and humidity trends due to climate change are the primary threat to this species.
