= Pristimantis pedimontanus =

Conservation status
- Vulnerable (IUCN 3.1)

Scientific classification
- Kingdom: Animalia
- Phylum: Chordata
- Class: Amphibia
- Order: Anura
- Clade: Brachycephaloidea
- Family: Craugastoridae
- Genus: Pristimantis
- Species: P. pedimontanus

Binomial name
- Pristimantis pedimontanus (La Marca, 2004)

Synonyms
- Eleutherodactylus pedimontanus La Marca, 2004

Species of amphibian

Pristimantis pedimontanus is a species of frogs in the family Strabomantidae.

It is endemic to Venezuela. Its natural habitat is tropical moist montane forests. It is threatened by habitat loss.
