= Atelopus chrysocorallus =

Conservation status
- Critically Endangered (IUCN 3.1)

Scientific classification
- Kingdom: Animalia
- Phylum: Chordata
- Class: Amphibia
- Order: Anura
- Family: Bufonidae
- Genus: Atelopus
- Species: A. chrysocorallus

Binomial name
- Atelopus chrysocorallus La Marca, 1996

Species of amphibian

Atelopus chrysocorallus, also known as the Niquitao harlequin toad, is a species of toad in the family Bufonidae endemic to Venezuela. Its natural habitats are subtropical or tropical moist montane forests, rivers, and intermittent rivers. It is threatened by habitat loss.
