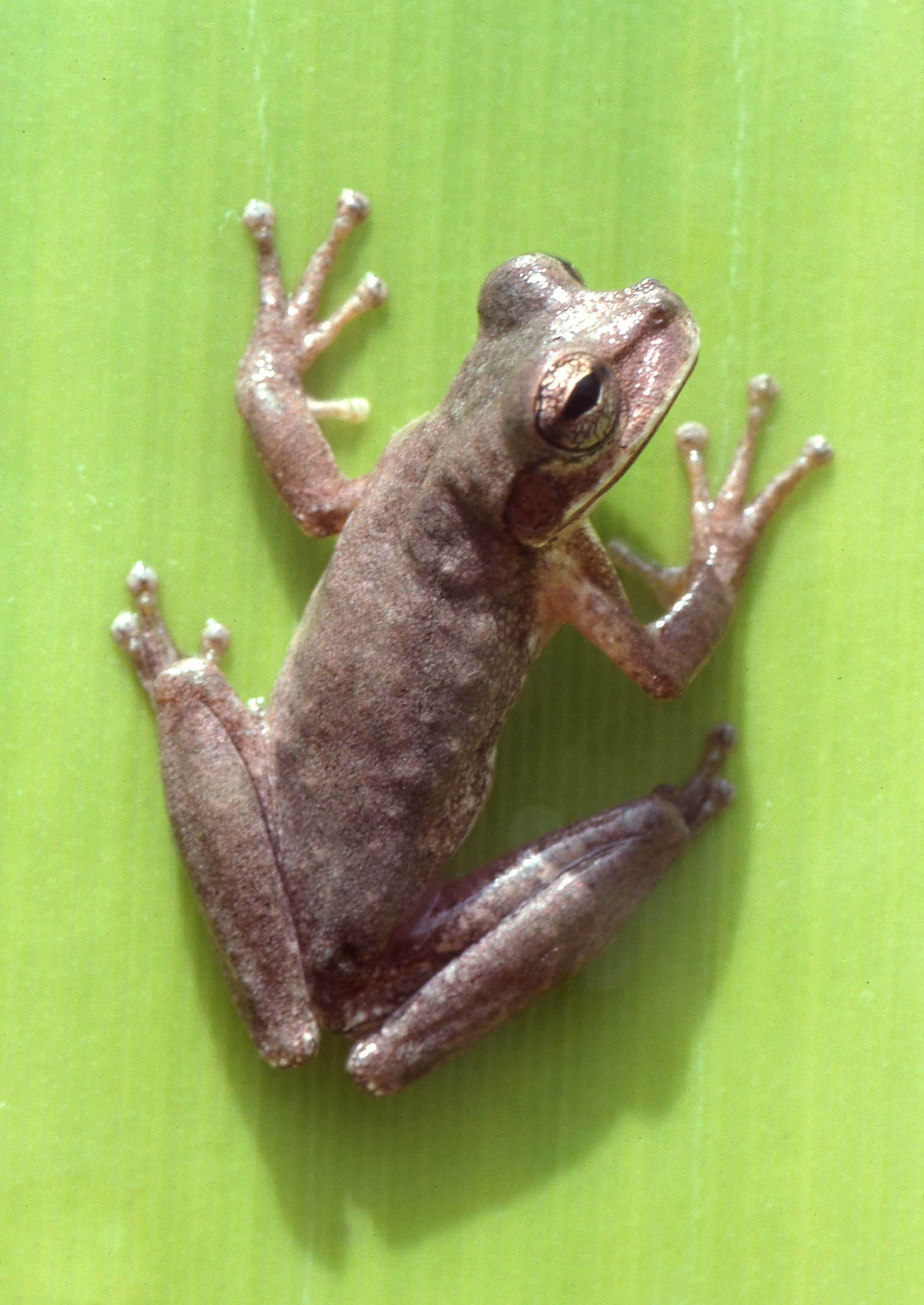
- Tepuihyla talbergae

Scientific classification
- Domain: Eukaryota
- Kingdom: Animalia
- Phylum: Chordata
- Class: Amphibia
- Order: Anura
- Family: Hylidae
- Subfamily: Lophyohylinae
- Genus: Tepuihyla; Ayarzagüena, Señaris & Gorzula, 1993

Diversity
- See text)

= Tepuihyla =

Genus of amphibians

Tepuihyla, commonly known as Amazon tree frogs or Tepui tree frogs, is a genus of frogs in the family Hylidae found in mountains of eastern and south-eastern Venezuela and Guyana, and likely in adjacent Brazil. Tepuihyla derives from the words tepui; table-top mountains characteristic of the Guiana Highlands, and Hyla, a wastebasket taxon that used to contain hundreds of species.

== Species ==
The following species are recognised in the genus Tepuihyla:

Binomial name and author	Common name
T. aecii (Ayarzagüena, Señaris, and Gorzula, 1993)	Monte Duida tree frog
T. edelcae (Ayarzagüena, Señaris, and Gorzula, 1993)	Ayarzaguena's tree frog
T. exophthalma (Smith and Noonan, 2001)
T. luteolabris (Ayarzagüena, Señaris, and Gorzula, 1993)
T. obscura (Kok, Ratz, Tegelaar, Aubret, and Means, 2015)
T. rodriguezi (Rivero, 1968)	Rodriguez's Amazon tree frog
T. shushupe (Ron, Venegas, Ortega-Andrade, Gagliardi-Urrutia, and Salerno, 2016)
T. tuberculosa (Boulenger, 1882)	Canelos treefrog
T. warreni (Duellman and Hoogmoed, 1992)
