= Riolama inopinata =

Scientific classification
- Kingdom: Animalia
- Phylum: Chordata
- Class: Reptilia
- Order: Squamata
- Family: Gymnophthalmidae
- Genus: Riolama
- Species: R. inopinata

Binomial name
- Riolama inopinata Kok, 2015

Species of lizard

Riolama inopinata is a species of lizard in the family Gymnophthalmidae. It is endemic to Venezuela.
