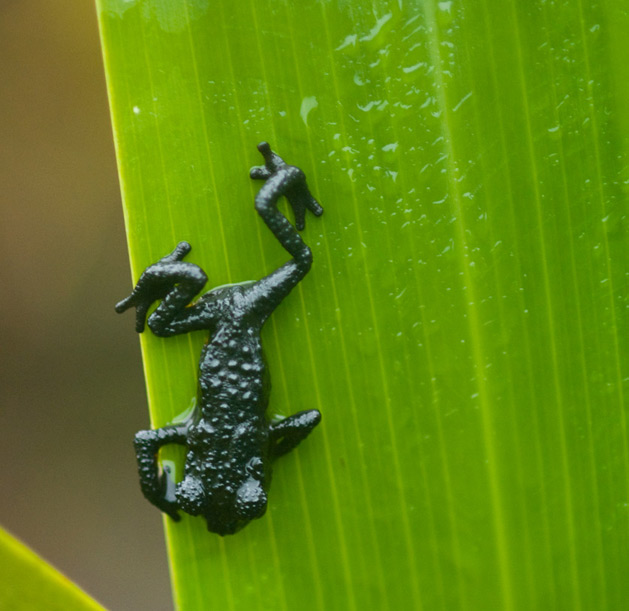
- Oreophrynella quelchii

Scientific classification
- Kingdom: Animalia
- Phylum: Chordata
- Class: Amphibia
- Order: Anura
- Family: Bufonidae
- Genus: Oreophrynella; Boulenger, 1895

Type species
- Oreophryne quelchii Boulenger, 1895

Species
- See table.

Synonyms
- Oreophryne Boulenger, 1895 — junior homonym of Oreophryne Boettger, 1895

= Oreophrynella =

Genus of amphibians

Oreophrynella, commonly known as bush toads, is a genus of true toads native to the tepuis of southern Venezuela and adjacent Guyana. The distribution of some species is restricted to a couple of tepuis or even a single tepui, as in the case of Oreophrynella weiassipuensis, which occurs on Wei-Assipu-tepui.

== Description ==
Species of the genus Oreophrynella are small frogs, less than 26 mm (1.0 in) in snout–vent length. They are characterized by opposable digits of the foot, dorsal skin that bears tubercules, and direct development (i.e., there is no free-living larval stage). The presence of opposable digits, unique among bufonids, in combination with an extension of the interdigital integument and the relative length/orientation of the digits, is likely to be an adaptation to facilitate life on rocky tepui summits and an exaptation to arboreality The genus also displays cranial simplification in the form of cranial fontanelles and absence of the quadratojugal, which may be driven by a reduction of developmental costs, increase in flexibility, and reduction of body weight. The cranial simplification combined with the shortening of the vertebral column and shift towards a partly firmisternal girdle may be adaptations to the peculiar tumbling behaviour displayed by Oreophrynella.

== Species ==
The following species are recognised in the genus Oreophrynella:

Binomial name and author	Common name
Oreophrynella cryptica Señaris, 1995
Oreophrynella dendronastes Lathrop & MacCulloch, 2007	Waterfall toad
Oreophrynella huberi Diego-Aransay and Gorzula, 1990	Bolivar bush toad
Oreophrynella macconnelli Boulenger, 1900	MacConnell's bush toad
Oreophrynella nigra Señaris, Ayarzagüena, and Gorzula, 1994	Pebble toad
Oreophrynella quelchii Boulenger, 1895	Roraima bush toad
Oreophrynella seegobini Kok, 2009
Oreophrynella vasquezi Señaris, Ayarzagüena, and Gorzula, 1994	Illu bush toad
Oreophrynella weiassipuensis Señaris, DoNascimento, and Villarreal, 2005
