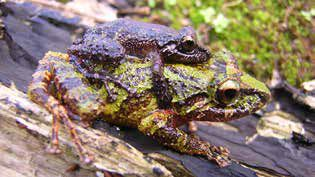
- A pair in amplexus from the Henri Pittier National Park

Conservation status
- Data Deficient (IUCN 3.1)

Scientific classification
- Kingdom: Animalia
- Phylum: Chordata
- Class: Amphibia
- Order: Anura
- Family: Strabomantidae
- Genus: Pristimantis
- Species: P. riveroi

Binomial name
- Pristimantis riveroi (Lynch and La Marca, 1993)

Synonyms
- Eleutherodactylus riveroi Lynch and La Marca, 1993

= Pristimantis riveroi =

Species of frog

Pristimantis riveroi is a species of frog in the family Strabomantidae. It is endemic to Venezuela and only known from the region of the type locality in the Serranía del Litoral in the state of Aragua. The specific name riveroi honours Juan A. Rivero, a Puerto Rican herpetologist. Accordingly, common name Rivero's ground frog has been proposed for it.

== Description ==
Adult males measure 16–23 mm (0.6–0.9 in) and adult females 30–36 mm (1.2–1.4 in) in snout–vent length. The snout is acuminate to subacuminate in dorsal view. The tympanum is just discernible; the supratympanic fold is low and not obscuring the tympanum. Dorsal skin is smooth but has scattered, pungent warts. Fingers and toes have board discs. Living animals are mossy green and may have pale-gray blotching or mottling. The snout can be gray or white. Males have a subgular vocal sac

== Habitat and conservation ==
Pristimantis riveroi lives in cloud forest at an elevation of about 1,100 m (3,600 ft) above sea level. It is an arboreal species that breeds by direct development (i.e., there is no free-living larval stage). It is locally common and faces no known threats. It is present in the Henri Pittier National Park.
