= Riolama leucosticta =

Conservation status
- Least Concern (IUCN 3.1)

Scientific classification
- Kingdom: Animalia
- Phylum: Chordata
- Class: Reptilia
- Order: Squamata
- Family: Gymnophthalmidae
- Genus: Riolama
- Species: R. leucosticta

Binomial name
- Riolama leucosticta (Boulenger, 1900)

Species of lizard

Riolama leucosticta, the white-spotted riolama, is a species of lizard in the family Gymnophthalmidae. It is endemic to Venezuela.
