= Josefa Celsa Señaris =

Venezuelan herpetologist

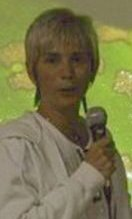
- Born: 2 November 1965 (age 60); Caracas
- Scientific career
- Author abbrev. (zoology): Señaris

Josefa Celsa Señaris (born 2 November 1965) is a Venezuelan herpetologist. She has published information about frogs and she has identified new genera and species. Señaris is the director of the La Salle Foundation's Natural History Museum (Spanish: Museo de historia natural La Salle - MhnLS) in Caracas.

== Life ==
Señaris was born in 1965 and she obtained a degree in biology at the Central University of Venezuela and her doctorate in 2001 at the University of Santiago de Compostela in Spain.

She is interested in the fauna of Venezuela, in particular the Guayana Region where table-top mountains called tepuis provide habitats for endemic plant and animal species: some amphibians are known only from a single tepuy. From a geological point of view, the tepuis have been isolated for approximately 120 million years, and it has been suggested that the tepuy habitats are a "lost world" that could support relictual populations. However, Señaris's work suggests that in a zoological context tepuis are not as isolated as originally believed, and that some of their species are neoendemics rather than paleoendemics. For example, an endemic group of tree frogs, Tepuihyla, have diverged after the tepuis were formed, that is, speciation followed colonization from the lowlands.

Señaris became the director in 2004 of the La Salle Foundation's Natural History Museum (Spanish: Museo de historia natural La Salle - MhnLS) in Caracas.

Señaris has erected two genera (including Tepuihyla mentioned above) and described several species new to science. In many cases Señaris collaborated with two other herpetologists, José Ayarzagüena and Stefan Gorzula.

== Honours ==
=== Eponyms ===
In recognition of her "contributions to the knowledge of centrolenid diversity and morphology" she has had a genus of glass frog, Celsiella, named after her nickname which is Celsi.

== Legacy ==
She has described a number of taxa, in particular amphibians but also a few reptiles.

=== Genera ===
- Metaphryniscus Señaris, Ayarzagüena & Gorzula, 1994
- Tepuihyla Ayarzagüena, Señaris & Gorzula, 1993

=== Species ===
- Arthrosaura testigensis Gorzula & Señaris, 1999
- Celsiella vozmedianoi Ayarzagüena & Señaris, 1997
- Cercosaura nigroventris Gorzula & Señaris, 1999
- Hyalinobatrachium guairarepanense Señaris, 2001
- Hyalinobatrachium mondolfii Señaris & Ayarzagüena, 2001
- Hypsiboas jimenezi Señaris & Ayarzagüena, 2006
- Hypsiboas rhythmicus Señaris & Ayarzagüena, 2002
- Metaphryniscus sosai Señaris, Ayarzagüena & Gorzula, 1994
- Myersiohyla aromatica Ayarzagüena & Señaris, 1994
- Myersiohyla inparquesi Ayarzagüena & Señaris, 1994
- Oreophrynella cryptica Señaris, 1995

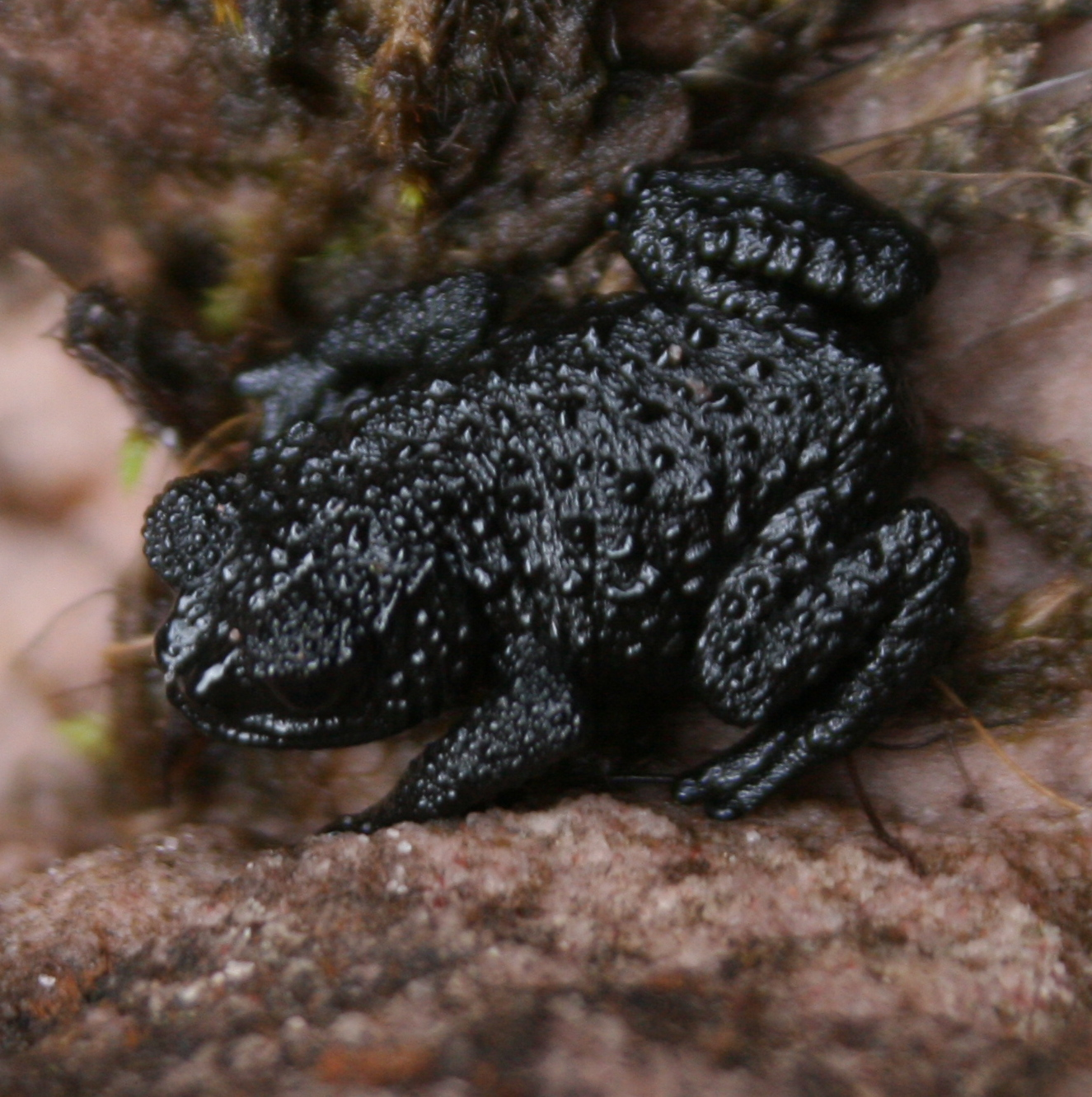
The pebble toad — Oreophrynella nigra — has been observed to roll itself into a ball (pebble) and to throw itself down inclines to avoid tarantula spiders.

- Oreophrynella nigra Señaris, Ayarzagüena & Gorzula, 1994
- Oreophrynella vasquezi Señaris, Ayarzagüena & Gorzula, 1994
- Oreophrynella weiassipuensis Señaris, Nascimento & Villarreal, 2005
- Riolama uzzelli Molina & Señaris, 2003
- Stefania oculosa Señaris, Ayarzagüena & Gorzula, 1997
- Stefania percristata Señaris, Ayarzagüena & Gorzula, 1997
- Stefania riveroi Señaris, Ayarzagüena & Gorzula, 1997
- Stefania satelles Señaris, Ayarzagüena & Gorzula, 1997
- Stefania schuberti Señaris, Ayarzagüena & Gorzula, 1997
- Tepuihyla aecii Ayarzagüena, Señaris & Gorzula, 1993
- Tepuihyla edelcae Ayarzagüena, Señaris & Gorzula, 1993
- Tepuihyla galani Ayarzagüena, Señaris & Gorzula, 1993
- Tepuihyla luteolabris Ayarzagüena, Señaris & Gorzula, 1993
- Tepuihyla rimarum Ayarzagüena, Señaris & Gorzula, 1993
- Vitreorana castroviejoi Ayarzagüena & Señaris, 1997
