= Pristimantis kareliae =

Conservation status
- Critically Endangered (IUCN 3.1)

Scientific classification
- Kingdom: Animalia
- Phylum: Chordata
- Class: Amphibia
- Order: Anura
- Family: Strabomantidae
- Genus: Pristimantis
- Subgenus: Pristimantis
- Species: P. kareliae

Binomial name
- Pristimantis kareliae (La Marca, 2005)

Synonyms
- Eleutherodactylus kareliae La Marca, 2005

Species of amphibian

Pristimantis kareliae is a species of frog in the family Strabomantidae. It is endemic to the Cordillera de Mérida in Venezuela and known from the region of Mucubají.

== Etymology ==
The specific name kareliae refers to Karelia, the daughter of Enrique La Marca, Venezuelan scientist who described the species. It also alludes to the Republic of Karelia, which is similarly rich with lakes as the type locality of this species.

== Description ==
Adult males measure 23–27 mm (0.91–1.06 in) and females 28–35 mm (1.1–1.4 in) in snout–vent length. The head is slightly wider than it is long. The canthus rostralis is slightly concave and poorly defined. The tympanum is distinct. The fingers and toes have no webbing and only small discs. The dorsum is black or very dark grey. The throat and belly are grey with many grey or black spots.

== Habitat and conservation ==
Natural habitats of Pristimantis kareliae are sub-páramo bushlands and páramo grasslands at elevations of 2,500–3,395 m (8,202–11,138 ft) above sea level. It occurs in the Sierra Nevada National Park.
