= Oreophrynella cryptica =

Conservation status
- Near Threatened (IUCN 3.1)

Scientific classification
- Kingdom: Animalia
- Phylum: Chordata
- Class: Amphibia
- Order: Anura
- Family: Bufonidae
- Genus: Oreophrynella
- Species: O. cryptica

Binomial name
- Oreophrynella cryptica Señaris, 1995

Species of amphibian

Oreophrynella cryptica is a species of toad in the family Bufonidae.

Its natural habitat is subtropical or tropical moist montane forests.

It is endemic to Auyan-tepui, Venezuela, and is classed as vulnerable because of its restricted range.
