= Boana jimenezi =

Conservation status
- Least Concern (IUCN 3.1)

Scientific classification
- Kingdom: Animalia
- Phylum: Chordata
- Class: Amphibia
- Order: Anura
- Family: Hylidae
- Genus: Boana
- Species: B. jimenezi

Binomial name
- Boana jimenezi (Señaris and Ayarzagüena, 2006)

Synonyms
- Hypsiboas jimenezi Señaris and Ayarzagüena, 2006

Species of frog

Boana jimenezi is a species of frog in the family Hylidae that is endemic to Venezuela.
