= Riolama grandis =

Scientific classification
- Kingdom: Animalia
- Phylum: Chordata
- Class: Reptilia
- Order: Squamata
- Family: Gymnophthalmidae
- Genus: Riolama
- Species: R. grandis

Binomial name
- Riolama grandis Recoder, Prates, Marques-Souza, Camacho, Sales-Nunes, Vechio, Ghellere, McDiarmid, & Rodrigues, 2020

Species of lizard

Riolama grandis is a species of lizard in the family Gymnophthalmidae. It is endemic to Brazil.
