= Riolama uzzelli =

Conservation status
- Least Concern (IUCN 3.1)

Scientific classification
- Kingdom: Animalia
- Phylum: Chordata
- Class: Reptilia
- Order: Squamata
- Family: Gymnophthalmidae
- Genus: Riolama
- Species: R. uzzelli

Binomial name
- Riolama uzzelli C. Molina & Señaris, 2003

Species of lizard

Riolama uzzelli is a species of lizard in the family Gymnophthalmidae. The species is endemic to Venezuela.

== Etymology ==
The specific name, uzzelli, is in honor of American Herpetologist Thomas Marshall Uzzell, Jr. (born 1932).

== Geographic range ==
R. uzzelli is found in the Venezuelan state of Amazonas.

== Habitat ==
The natural habitat of R. uzzelli is the summit of a tepui, at altitudes of 1,850–2,600 m (6,070–8,530 ft).

== Reproduction ==
R. uzzelli is oviparous.
