= Oreophrynella vasquezi =

Illu bush toad

Conservation status
- Vulnerable (IUCN 3.1)

Scientific classification
- Kingdom: Animalia
- Phylum: Chordata
- Class: Amphibia
- Order: Anura
- Family: Bufonidae
- Genus: Oreophrynella
- Species: O. vasquezi

Binomial name
- Oreophrynella vasquezi Señaris, Ayarzaguena & Gorzula, 1994

Species of amphibian

The Ilu bush toad or Ilu tepui toad (Oreophrynella vasquezi) is a species of toad in the family Bufonidae. It is found in Venezuela and possibly Guyana.

Its natural habitat is subtropical or tropical moist montane forests. It is known from a single location, Ilú-tepui.
