= Scarlet harlequin toad =

Conservation status
- Critically endangered, possibly extinct (IUCN 3.1)

Scientific classification
- Kingdom: Animalia
- Phylum: Chordata
- Class: Amphibia
- Order: Anura
- Family: Bufonidae
- Genus: Atelopus
- Species: A. sorianoi

Binomial name
- Atelopus sorianoi La Marca, 1983

Species of amphibian

The scarlet harlequin toad or sapito arlequin de Soriano (Atelopus sorianoi) is a species of toad in the family Bufonidae. It is endemic to Venezuela. Its natural habitats are subtropical or tropical moist montane forests and rivers. The scarlet harlequin toad was a bright orange, with males growing up to 38-41.5mm and females growing up 42-50mm. It is threatened by habitat loss, and may already be extinct. The toad is among the 25 "most wanted lost" species that are the focus of Re:wild's "Search for Lost Species" initiative.
