= Monte Duida tree frog =

Conservation status
- Near Threatened (IUCN 3.1)

Scientific classification
- Kingdom: Animalia
- Phylum: Chordata
- Class: Amphibia
- Order: Anura
- Family: Hylidae
- Genus: Tepuihyla
- Species: T. aecii

Binomial name
- Tepuihyla aecii Ayarzagüena, Señaris, and Gorzula, 1992

Synonyms
- Osteocephalus aecii Ayarzagüena, Señaris, and Gorzula, 1993 "1992"

Species of amphibian

The Monte Duida tree frog (Tepuihyla aecii) is a species of frog in the family Hylidae. It is endemic to Venezuela and only known from the Cerro Duida, its type locality in the Amazonas state of southern Venezuela. Its natural habitat is montane tepui vegetation, specifically forest and shrubs adjacent to rivers, streams, and peat bogs. No significant threats to this species occurring in the Duida-Marahuaca National Park are known.

Tepuihyla aecii is only known from Cerro Duida, Venezuela
