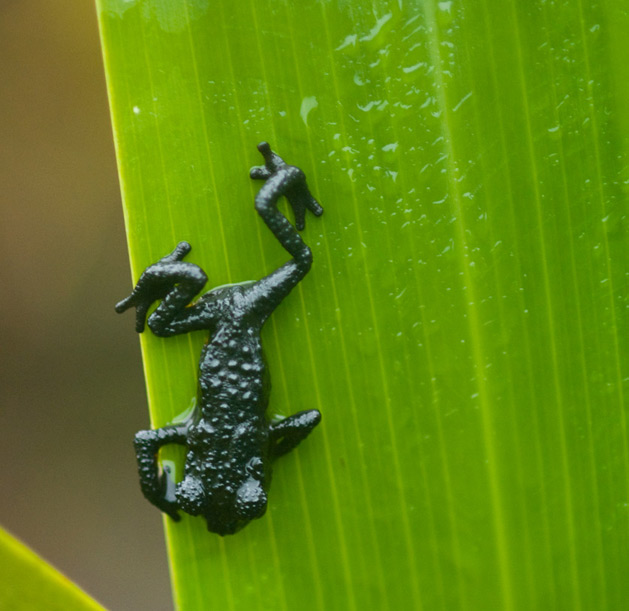

Conservation status
- Vulnerable (IUCN 3.1)

Scientific classification
- Kingdom: Animalia
- Phylum: Chordata
- Class: Amphibia
- Order: Anura
- Family: Bufonidae
- Genus: Oreophrynella
- Species: O. quelchii

Binomial name
- Oreophrynella quelchii Boulenger, 1895

Synonyms
- Oreophryne Quelchii Boulenger, 1895

= Oreophrynella quelchii =

Species of amphibian

Oreophrynella quelchii, commonly known as the Roraima black frog or Roraima bush toad, is a species of toad in the family Bufonidae. This species is restricted to the transboundary summit of Mount Roraima in Venezuela, Guyana and Brazil, and to the nearby Wei-Assipu-tepui on the Brazil–Guyana border. It has been recorded at elevations of 2,300–2,800 m (7,500–9,200 ft) above sea level.

== History and etymology ==
Oreophrynella quelchii was described as Oreophryne Quelchii by George Albert Boulenger in 1895. The description was based on one of the several specimens collected from the summit of Mount Roraima by Mr. J. J. Quelch and Mr. F. McConnell. The species was named for the former.

== Description ==
The holotype, a male, measures 22 mm (0.87 in) in snout–vent length. Coloration is black, but the throat and belly are spotted or marbled with bright yellow, also described as bright orange with black mottling. Webbing between the fingers and toes is moderate (basal). The dorsum has a high density of tubercles of various sizes.

== Habitat and conservation ==
The species' natural habitats are high montane tepui environments. It is diurnal and usually found on open rock surfaces. It is a common species on the summit of Mount Roraima. There are currently no major threats, although the restricted range of the species makes it vulnerable to stochastic events. Also disturbance by tourists could be a threat. Parts of its range are protected by the Canaima National Park (Venezuela) and Monte Roraima National Park (Brazil).
