= Mérida cable car frog =

Conservation status
- Critically Endangered (IUCN 3.1)

Scientific classification
- Kingdom: Animalia
- Phylum: Chordata
- Class: Amphibia
- Order: Anura
- Clade: Brachycephaloidea
- Family: Craugastoridae
- Genus: Pristimantis
- Subgenus: Pristimantis
- Species: P. telefericus

Binomial name
- Pristimantis telefericus (La Marca, 2005)

Synonyms
- Eleutherodactylus telefericus La Marca, 2005

Species of amphibian

The Mérida cable car frog (Pristimantis telefericus), also known as the Teleférico rubber frog, is a species of frog in the family Strabomantidae. It is endemic to the Cordillera de Mérida in Venezuela. It is known from near two stations (La Aguada and Loma Redonda) of the Mérida cable car in the Libertador Municipality, Mérida.

== Etymology ==
The specific name telefericus refers to its type locality along Teleférico de Mérida, the Mérida cable car.

== Description ==
Adult males measure 23–30 mm (0.91–1.18 in) and females 36–41 mm (1.4–1.6 in) in snout–vent length. The head is slightly wider than it is long. The canthus rostralis is straight and well defined. The tympanum is distinct and oval in shape. The fingers and toes have no webbing and only small discs. The coloration is variable. The dorsum may range from brown to almost black. There are usually two lighter dorso-lateral stripes. Some individuals have a W-mark on their shoulders. The venter is grey to creamy grey, sometimes with black marbling.

== Habitat and conservation ==
Natural habitats of Pristimantis telefericus are páramos at elevations of 3,400–3,500 m (11,200–11,500 ft) above sea level. The habitat is dominated by grasses and frailejóns (Espeletia spp.). Most animals were found under stones.

The species occurs in the Sierra Nevada National Park, but its known area of distribution is nevertheless very small. The construction of the Mérida cable car system in the mid-20th century brought severe vegetation changes in the vicinity of the stations, a process which was repeated when the stations were renovated in 2008. The chytrid fungus has not been detected in this species but could still pose a risk; it is possible that the species was already affected by the fungus and suffered major population declines, and recently recorded individuals are the resistant survivors of the outbreak. A notable retreat in the glaciers of the nearby Pico Bolívar has been detected, indicating that climate change is affecting the area; this may lead to warmer temperatures and more pronounced and extended dry seasons. These threats, when combined with its small area of occurrence, has led to it being classified as Critically Endangered on the IUCN Red List.
