= Warren's tree frog =

Conservation status
- Endangered (IUCN 3.1)

Scientific classification
- Kingdom: Animalia
- Phylum: Chordata
- Class: Amphibia
- Order: Anura
- Family: Hylidae
- Genus: Tepuihyla
- Species: T. warreni

Binomial name
- Tepuihyla warreni (Duellman & Hoogmoed, 1992)

Synonyms
- Hyla warreni Duellman & Hoogmoed, 1992

Species of amphibian

Warren's tree frog (Tepuihyla warreni) is a species of frog in the family Hylidae found in Guyana and possibly Brazil and Venezuela. Its natural habitats are subtropical or tropical moist montane forests, rivers, freshwater marshes, and intermittent freshwater marshes.

Originally placed in the genus Hyla because its true relationships were unknown, it has since been placed in the genus Tepuihyla.
