= Ayarzaguena's tree frog =

Conservation status
- Least Concern (IUCN 3.1)

Scientific classification
- Kingdom: Animalia
- Phylum: Chordata
- Class: Amphibia
- Order: Anura
- Family: Hylidae
- Genus: Tepuihyla
- Species: T. edelcae

Binomial name
- Tepuihyla edelcae Ayarzaguena, Señaris & Gorzula, 1992

Species of amphibian

Ayarzaguena's tree frog (Tepuihyla edelcae) is a species of frog in the family Hylidae found in Venezuela and possibly Guyana. Its natural habitats are subtropical or tropical high-altitude shrubland, swamps, freshwater marshes, and intermittent freshwater marshes.
