= Tepuihyla shushupe =

Conservation status
- Least Concern (IUCN 3.1)

Scientific classification
- Kingdom: Animalia
- Phylum: Chordata
- Class: Amphibia
- Order: Anura
- Family: Hylidae
- Genus: Tepuihyla
- Species: T. shushupe

Binomial name
- Tepuihyla shushupe Ron, Venegas, Ortega-Andrade, Gagliardi-Urrutia, and Salerno, 2016

Species of frog

Tepuihyla shushupe is a frog in the family Hylidae. Scientists know it exclusively from its site of collection, the headwaters of the rivers Ere and Campuya near the Colombian border within Peru. They collected the sample 145 meters above sea level.

== Morphology ==
The adult male frog measures about 85.4 mm long in snout-vent length and the adult female frog about 85.7 mm. The iris of the eye is whitish in color with red around the outside. The skin of the dorsum is light green and the ventrum yellow-green. The skin is granular, with dark brown color on the back of each granule. Parts of the legs are whitish in color and parts are yellow-green. This frog has fringed skin on all four legs.

== Habitat ==
This frog lives in terrace habitats thick with leaf litter, many tree roots, and small swamps. When scientists caught the first holotype male, it was sitting in a hole in a tree.

== Etymology ==
The scientists named this frog shushupe after vernacular name of the snake Lachesis muta in the language of the local indigenous people. There is a common belief that the snake can sing or otherwise vocalize. The scientists consider it possible that people have been hearing the vocalizations of Tepuihyla shushupe and attributing them to the snake.
