= Pristimantis colostichos =

Conservation status
- Endangered (IUCN 3.1)

Scientific classification
- Kingdom: Animalia
- Phylum: Chordata
- Class: Amphibia
- Order: Anura
- Clade: Brachycephaloidea
- Family: Craugastoridae
- Genus: Pristimantis
- Species: P. colostichos

Binomial name
- Pristimantis colostichos (La Marca & Smith, 1982)

Synonyms
- Eleutherodactylus colostichos La Marca & Smith, 1982

Species of frog

Pristimantis colostichos is a species of frog in the family Strabomantidae. It is endemic to Venezuela. Its natural habitat is tropical high-altitude grassland. It is threatened by habitat loss.
