= Oreophrynella macconnelli =

Conservation status
- Vulnerable (IUCN 3.1)

Scientific classification
- Kingdom: Animalia
- Phylum: Chordata
- Class: Amphibia
- Order: Anura
- Family: Bufonidae
- Genus: Oreophrynella
- Species: O. macconnelli

Binomial name
- Oreophrynella macconnelli Boulenger, 1900
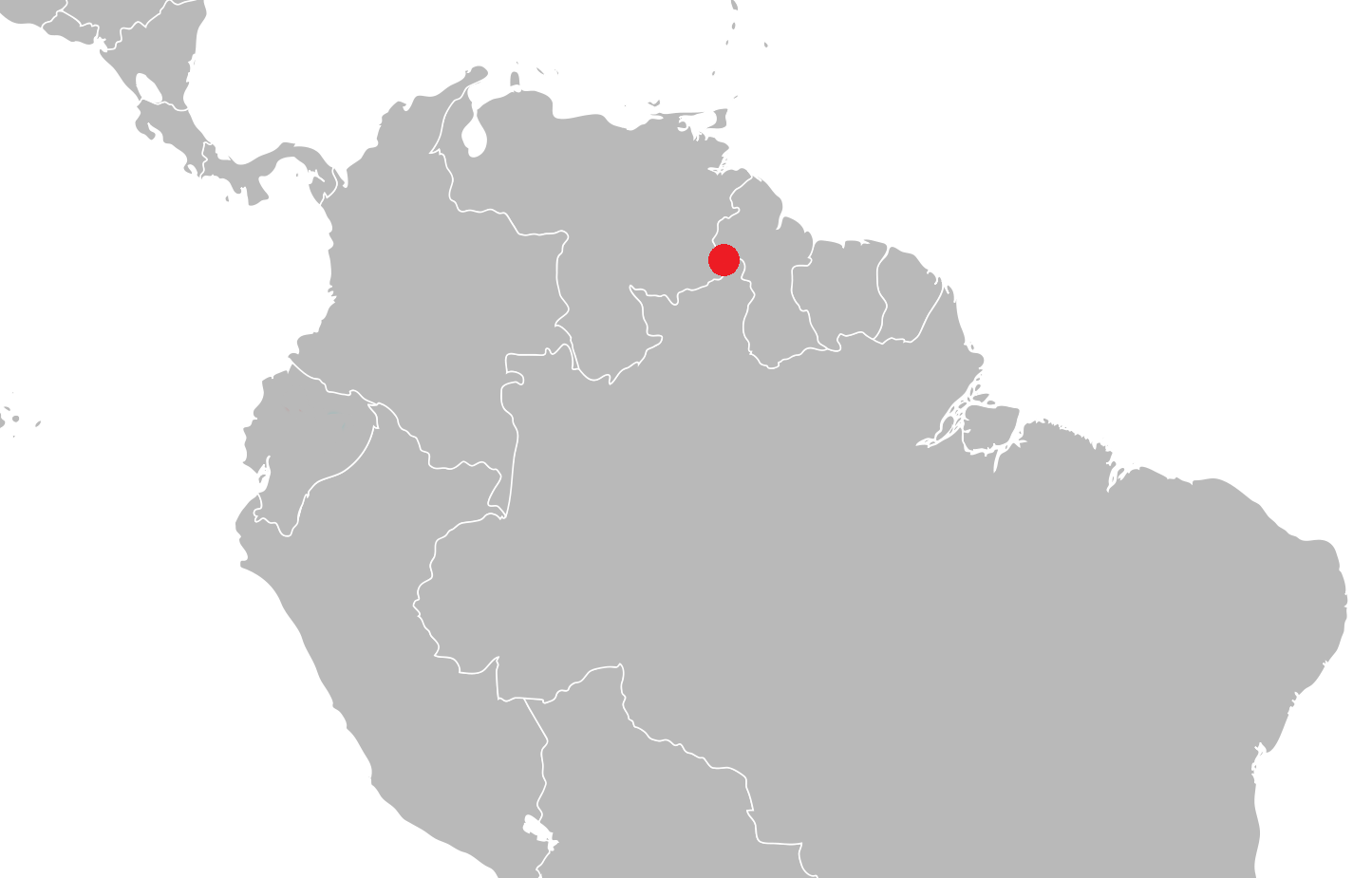
- Range map

Synonyms
- Oreophrynella dendronastes

Species of amphibian

Oreophrynella macconnelli is a species of toad in the family Bufonidae. It is found in Guyana, Venezuela, and possibly Brazil. Its natural habitats are subtropical or tropical moist lowland forests and subtropical or tropical moist montane forests. Incapable of leaping and able to crawl slowly, it can evade predators such as snakes by falling through the tree canopy to safety, its small size protecting it from injury.

Oreophrynella macconnelli is also called the waterfall toad.
