= Oreophrynella huberi =

El Sol bush toad

Conservation status
- Vulnerable (IUCN 3.1)

Scientific classification
- Kingdom: Animalia
- Phylum: Chordata
- Class: Amphibia
- Order: Anura
- Family: Bufonidae
- Genus: Oreophrynella
- Species: O. huberi

Binomial name
- Oreophrynella huberi Diego-Aransay & Gorzula, 1987

Species of amphibian

The El Sol bush toad or tepui bush toad (Oreophrynella huberi) is a species of toad in the family Bufonidae. It is endemic to Venezuela. Its natural habitats are subtropical or tropical moist montane forests and swamps.

== Conservation status ==
It is classed as vulnerable as it is known from a single location in Bolivar State, Cerro El Sol, to the north-east of the Auyán-tepui.
