= Tepuihyla exophthalma =

Conservation status
- Least Concern (IUCN 3.1)

Scientific classification
- Kingdom: Animalia
- Phylum: Chordata
- Class: Amphibia
- Order: Anura
- Family: Hylidae
- Genus: Tepuihyla
- Species: T. exophthalma

Binomial name
- Tepuihyla exophthalma (Smith & Noonan, 2001)

Synonyms
- Osteocephalus exophthalmus Smith & Noonan, 2001

Species of frog

Tepuihyla exophthalma is a species of frog in the family Hylidae. It is native to Guyana and Venezuela in South America.

This species was first described to science in 2001. The type specimen was collected in the Pacaraima Mountains in western Guyana. There it inhabited sclerophyll forest habitat and was observed to be active at night.

Males can reach up to 3.3 centimeters in length and females up to 4.3 centimeters in length. Its eyes are described as "large and bulgy" and "huge and protruding" and inspired the specific epithet exophthalmus. They are buff with a black cross shape across the iris; this eye coloration is a main feature that distinguishes the species from other frogs in the genus. Its body is brownish above and cream-colored below, and the back surface of the thighs are black. The vocal sac of the male is not well developed. The skin is mostly smooth with a few tubercles along the dorsal surface and a granular texture to the throat and belly.

After the first specimen was recorded, the species was also discovered living in Guyana's Kaieteur National Park and across the border in Estado Bolívar, Venezuela.
