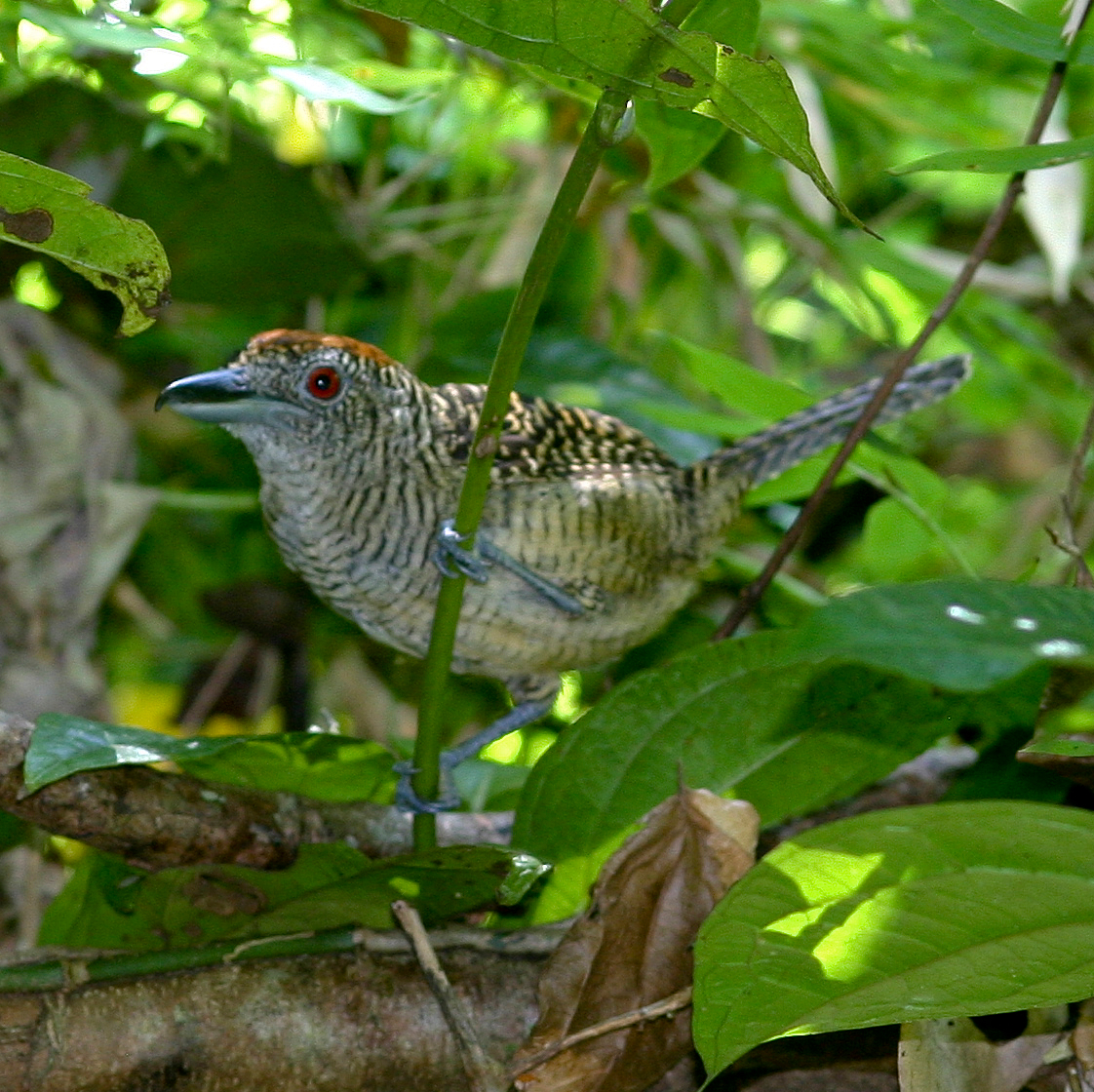
- Fasciated antshrike (Cymbilaimus lineatus) (female)

Scientific classification
- Kingdom: Animalia
- Phylum: Chordata
- Class: Aves
- Order: Passeriformes
- Family: Thamnophilidae
- Genus: Cymbilaimus; G.R. Gray, 1840

Type species
- Lanius lineatus Leach, 1814

= Cymbilaimus =

Genus of birds

Cymbilaimus is a genus of passerine birds in the antbird family, Thamnophilidae. It contains two species:

- Fasciated antshrike (Cymbilaimus lineatus)
- Bamboo antshrike (Cymbilaimus sanctaemariae)
