= Atractus micheleae =

Conservation status
- Least Concern (IUCN 3.1)

Scientific classification
- Kingdom: Animalia
- Phylum: Chordata
- Class: Reptilia
- Order: Squamata
- Suborder: Serpentes
- Family: Colubridae
- Genus: Atractus
- Species: A. micheleae

Binomial name
- Atractus micheleae Esqueda & La Marca, 2005

Species of snake

Atractus micheleae is a species of snake in the subfamily Dipsadinae of the family Colubridae. The species is endemic to Venezuela.

== Etymology ==
The specific name, micheleae, is in honor of Venezuelan ecologist Michele Ataroff Soler. She collected the holotype.

== Geographic distribution ==
Atractus micheleae is found in the Venezuelan states of Mérida and Táchira.

== Habitat ==
The preferred natural habitat of Atractus micheleae is forest, at elevations of 1,000–1,700 m (3,300–5,600 ft).

== Behavior ==
Atractus micheleae is terrestrial.

== Reproduction ==
Atractus micheleae is oviparous.
