= Jaua-Sarisariñama National Park =

State-protected area in Venezuela

- Parque Nacional Jaua-Sarisariñama
- IUCN category II (national park)
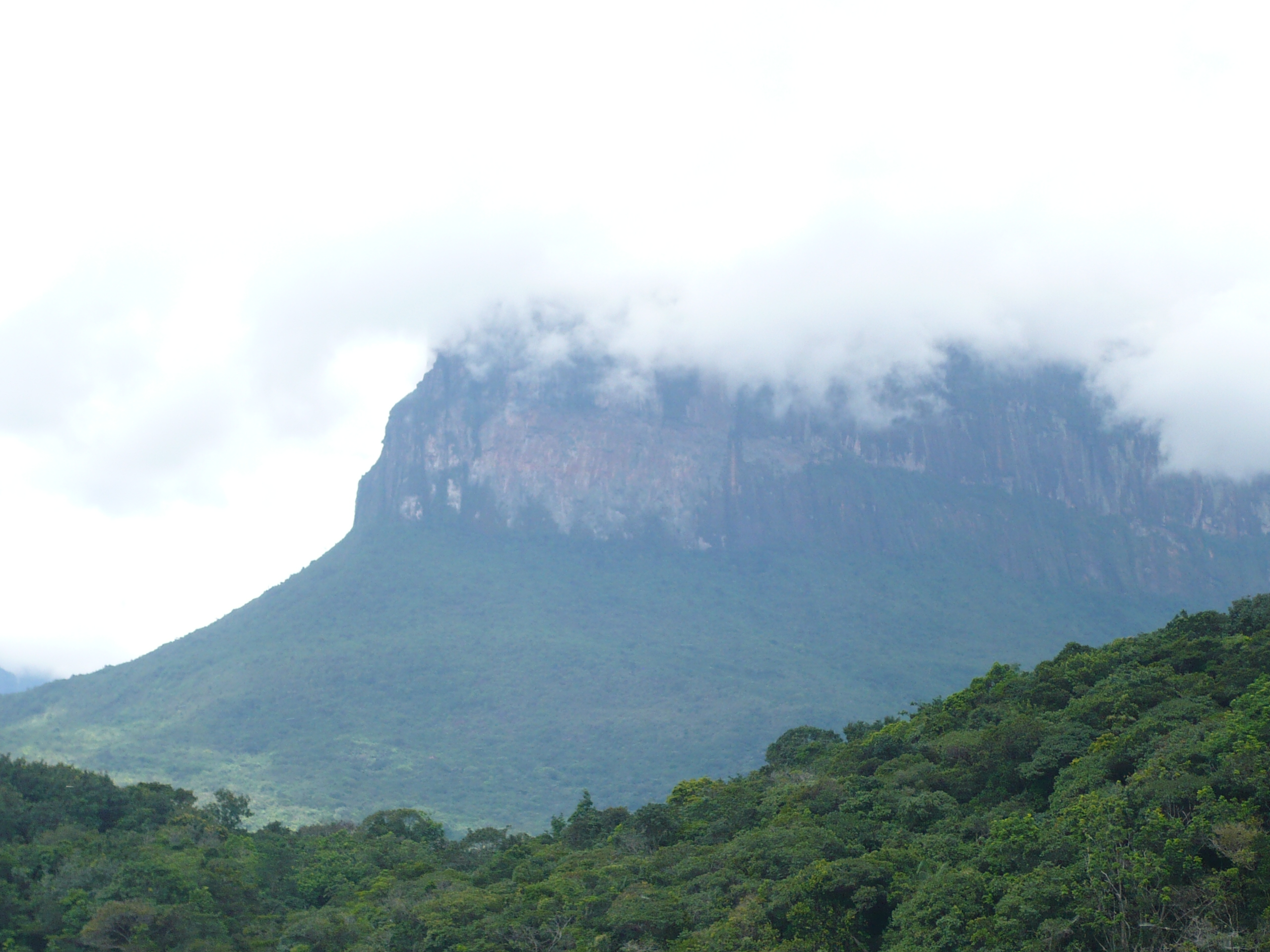
- Sarisariñama is one of three sandstone mountains at Jaua-Sarisariñama.
- Location: Guayana Highlands, Bolívar State
- Established: 1978; 48 years ago
- Governing body: INPARQUES

Jaua-Sarisariñama National Park (Spanish: Parque nacional Jaua-Sarisariñama) was located in the Guayana Highlands, within Bolívar State of southeastern Venezuela. It was established in 1978. It has been subsumed within Caura National Park, which was established in 2017.

The landscape of the park is notable for three sandstone tepuis, Jaua, Sarisariñama and Guanacoco. The top of Sarisariñama is forested and has sinkholes.

== Ecology ==
The park is an Important Bird Area. Resident bird species include Tepui parrotlet (Nannopsittaca panychlora).

Amphibians of interest include three species of stefania (carrying frogs) which appear to be endemic to the park:

- Stefania oculosa (Spanish: Rana Stefania De Ojos Grandes)
- Stefania percristata
- Stefania riae
