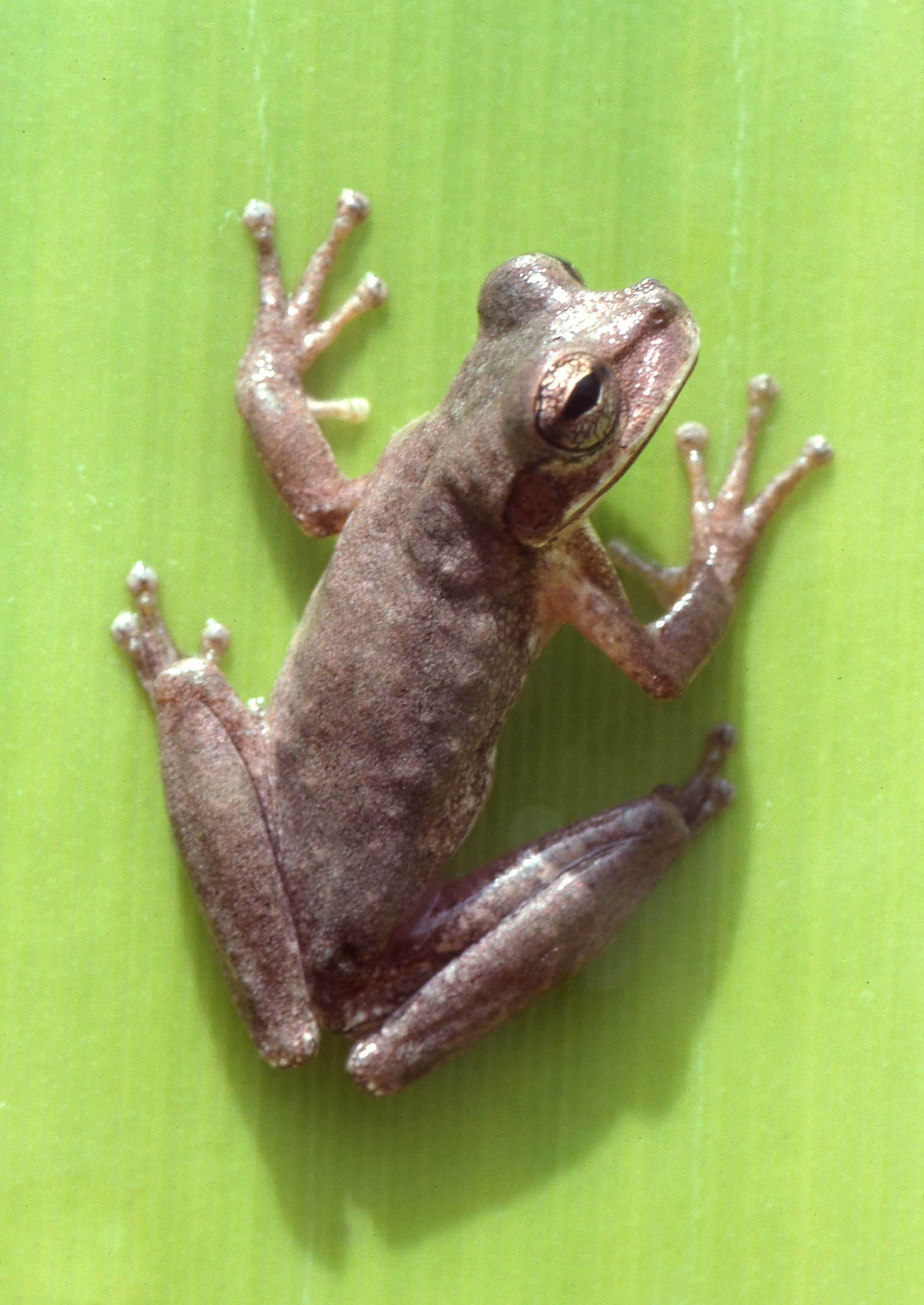

Conservation status
- Data Deficient (IUCN 3.1)

Scientific classification
- Kingdom: Animalia
- Phylum: Chordata
- Class: Amphibia
- Order: Anura
- Family: Hylidae
- Genus: Tepuihyla
- Species: T. talbergae

Binomial name
- Tepuihyla talbergae Duellman & Yoshpa, 1996

= Tepuihyla talbergae =

Kaieteur Tepui Treefrog

Species of amphibian

The Kaieteur Tepui treefrog (Tepuihyla talbergae) is a species of frog in the family Hylidae endemic to Guyana. This species is known only from the type locality, which is given as "Kaieteur Falls, 366 m asl (05° 10' N; 59° 28' W), Mazaruni-Potaro District, Guyana" (Duellman and Yoshpa 1996). It might occur more widely.
