= Riolama luridiventris =

Conservation status
- Least Concern (IUCN 3.1)

Scientific classification
- Kingdom: Animalia
- Phylum: Chordata
- Class: Reptilia
- Order: Squamata
- Family: Gymnophthalmidae
- Genus: Riolama
- Species: R. luridiventris

Binomial name
- Riolama luridiventris Esqueda, La Marca, & Praderio, 2004

Species of lizard

Riolama luridiventris is a species of lizard in the family Gymnophthalmidae. It is endemic to Venezuela.
