= Tepuihyla obscura =

Conservation status
- Endangered (IUCN 3.1)

Scientific classification
- Kingdom: Animalia
- Phylum: Chordata
- Class: Amphibia
- Order: Anura
- Family: Hylidae
- Genus: Tepuihyla
- Species: T. obscura

Binomial name
- Tepuihyla obscura Kok, Ratz, Tegelaar, Aubret, and Means, 2015

Species of frog

Tepuihyla obscura is a frog in the family Hylidae endemic to Bolivar State in Venezuela. Scientists have seen it near summits in the Chimantá Massif, between 1800 and 2600 meters above sea level.

The adult male frogs listed in the original publication measured 32.05 to 37.12 mm in snout-vent length and the adult female frog 26.44 to 33.67 mm. The skin on the frog's back is gray or gray-brown in color with darker marks. The female frog's skin is smooth.

The tadpoles swim in pools where the water is not deep, in puddles in rocks, or in peat bogs.

Scientists believe that this frog was produced by a recent example of non-adaptive radiation.
