= Riolama stellata =

Scientific classification
- Kingdom: Animalia
- Phylum: Chordata
- Class: Reptilia
- Order: Squamata
- Family: Gymnophthalmidae
- Genus: Riolama
- Species: R. stellata

Binomial name
- Riolama stellata Recoder, Prates, Marques-Souza, Camacho, Sales-Nunes, Vechio, Ghellere, McDiarmid, & Rodrigues, 2020

Species of lizard

Riolama stellata is a species of lizard in the family Gymnophthalmidae. It is endemic to Brazil.
