= Oreophrynella weiassipuensis =

Conservation status
- Data Deficient (IUCN 3.1)

Scientific classification
- Kingdom: Animalia
- Phylum: Chordata
- Class: Amphibia
- Order: Anura
- Family: Bufonidae
- Genus: Oreophrynella
- Species: O. weiassipuensis

Binomial name
- Oreophrynella weiassipuensis Señaris, DoNascimiento, and Villarreal, 2005

Species of amphibian

Oreophrynella weiassipuensis is a species of toads in the family Bufonidae. It is only known from Wei-Assipu-tepui, a tepui on the border between Brazil and Guyana. The holotype was collected in 2000 by a speleological expedition to Wei-Assipu-tepui. No other specimens are known. It is possible that it is present in other localities, but most species of Oreophrynella are endemic to a single mountain.

== Description ==
The holotype, an adult male, measures 21 mm (0.83 in) in snout–vent length. Its characteristics are well developed post-orbital crests, well-developed webbing in hands and feet, dorsal skin that is minutely granular with scattered large tubercles particularly on the upper eyelids and flanks, and reddish brown dorsal and ventral coloration. The tympanum is absent.

== Habitat and conservation ==
The only known individual was found on moss in a wet forest at the bottom of a large chasm at 2,280 m (7,480 ft) above sea level. There are no known threats to this species. The Brazilian part of the mountain is within the Monte Roraima National Park.
