= Atractus eriki =

Conservation status
- Data Deficient (IUCN 3.1)

Scientific classification
- Kingdom: Animalia
- Phylum: Chordata
- Class: Reptilia
- Order: Squamata
- Suborder: Serpentes
- Family: Colubridae
- Genus: Atractus
- Species: A. eriki

Binomial name
- Atractus eriki Esqueda, La Marca & Bazó, 2005

Species of snake

Atractus eriki is a species of snake in the family Colubridae. The species is endemic to Venezuela.

== Etymology ==
The specific name, eriki, is in honor of Erik La Marca (born 1990), who is the youngest son of Venezuelan herpetologist Enrique La Marca.

== Geographic range ==
A. eriki is native to the western slope of the Cordillera de Mérida in the western Venezuelan states of Mérida, Táchira, and Trujillo.

== Habitat ==
The preferred natural habitat of A. eriki is forest, at altitudes of 900–1,500 m (3,000–4,900 ft).

== Reproduction ==
A. eriki is oviparous.
