= Pristimantis vanadise =

Conservation status
- Endangered (IUCN 3.1)

Scientific classification
- Kingdom: Animalia
- Phylum: Chordata
- Class: Amphibia
- Order: Anura
- Clade: Brachycephaloidea
- Family: Craugastoridae
- Genus: Pristimantis
- Species: P. vanadise

Binomial name
- Pristimantis vanadise (La Marca, 1984)

Synonyms
- Eleutherodactylus vanadise La Marca, 1984; Eleutherodactylus cerasoventris Rivero, 1984 "1982"

Species of amphibian

Pristimantis vanadise, also known as La Marca's robber frog or blue cloudy frog, is a species of frog in the family Strabomantidae.

It is endemic to Venezuela. Its natural habitat is tropical moist montane forests.
