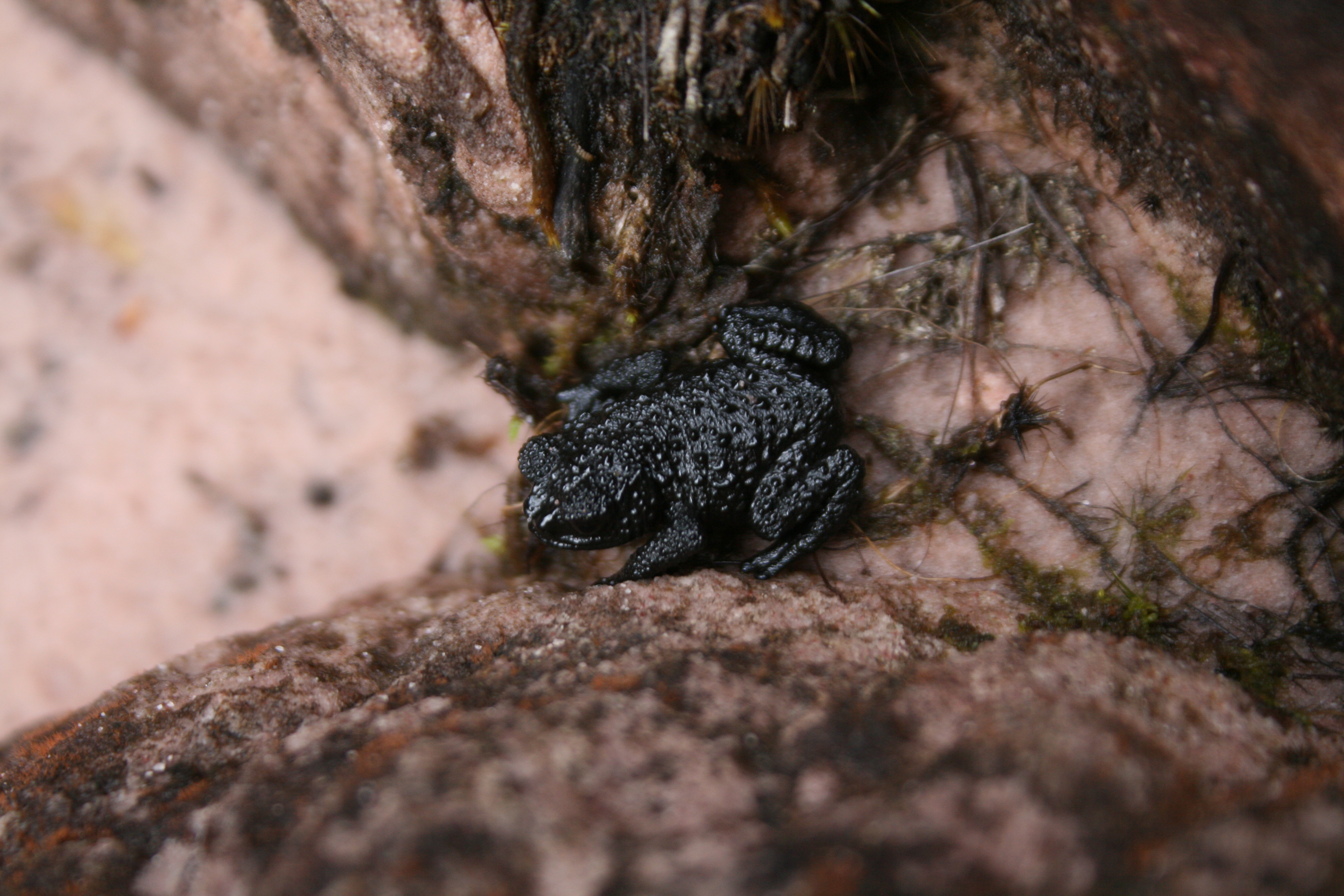

Conservation status
- Vulnerable (IUCN 3.1)

Scientific classification
- Kingdom: Animalia
- Phylum: Chordata
- Class: Amphibia
- Order: Anura
- Family: Bufonidae
- Genus: Oreophrynella
- Species: O. nigra

Binomial name
- Oreophrynella nigra Señaris, Ayarzagüena, and Gorzula, 1994

= Oreophrynella nigra =

Species of amphibian

Oreophrynella nigra, or pebble toad, is a species of toad in the family Bufonidae. It is endemic to the Guiana Highlands in Bolívar State, Venezuela, and known from two tepuis, Kukenan-tepui and Yuruani-tepui, both belonging to the Eastern Tepuis.

== Description and behaviour ==
It is a small species of toad: males measure 16.5–23.5 mm (0.65–0.93 in) and females 20.4–30 mm (0.80–1.18 in) in snout–vent length.

When threatened, the toad folds its limbs under its body, tucks its head in and tenses in a ball shape. If on an incline (this is how it gets its name), this causes it to roll down the slope, escaping the attention of its predator, and looking like a dislodged pebble. Its cryptic black and dark grey coloring that may appear as dark navy blue to some blends with its sandstone habitat.

== Habitat and conservation ==
Its natural habitats are rocks and peat bogs in montane tepui environments at elevations of 2,300–2,700 m (7,500–8,900 ft) asl. It is classified as vulnerable because of its apparently restricted range.

== Media interest ==
This toad was featured on a BBC series, Life, pursued by a tarantula spider.
