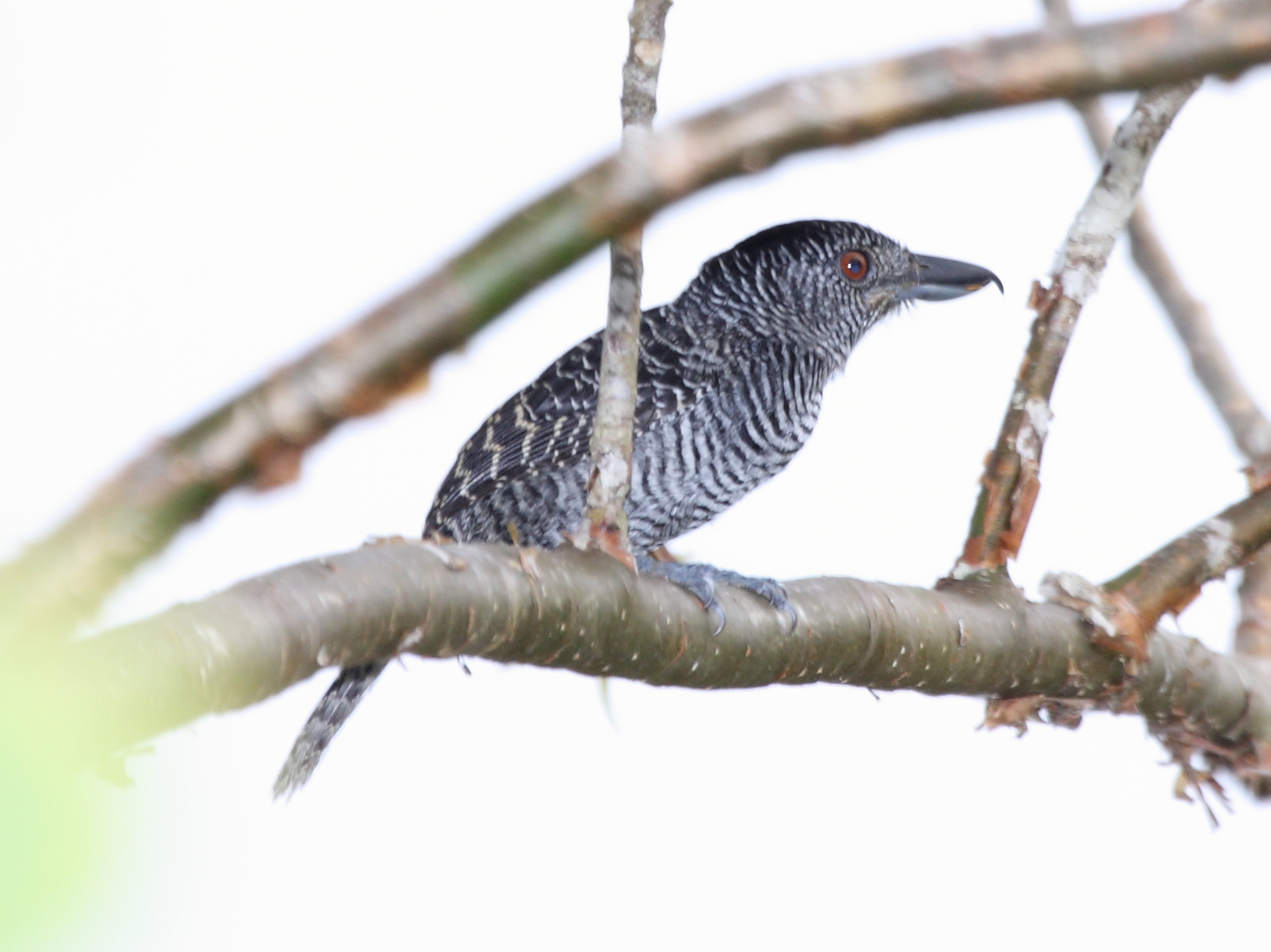
- Male in Panama
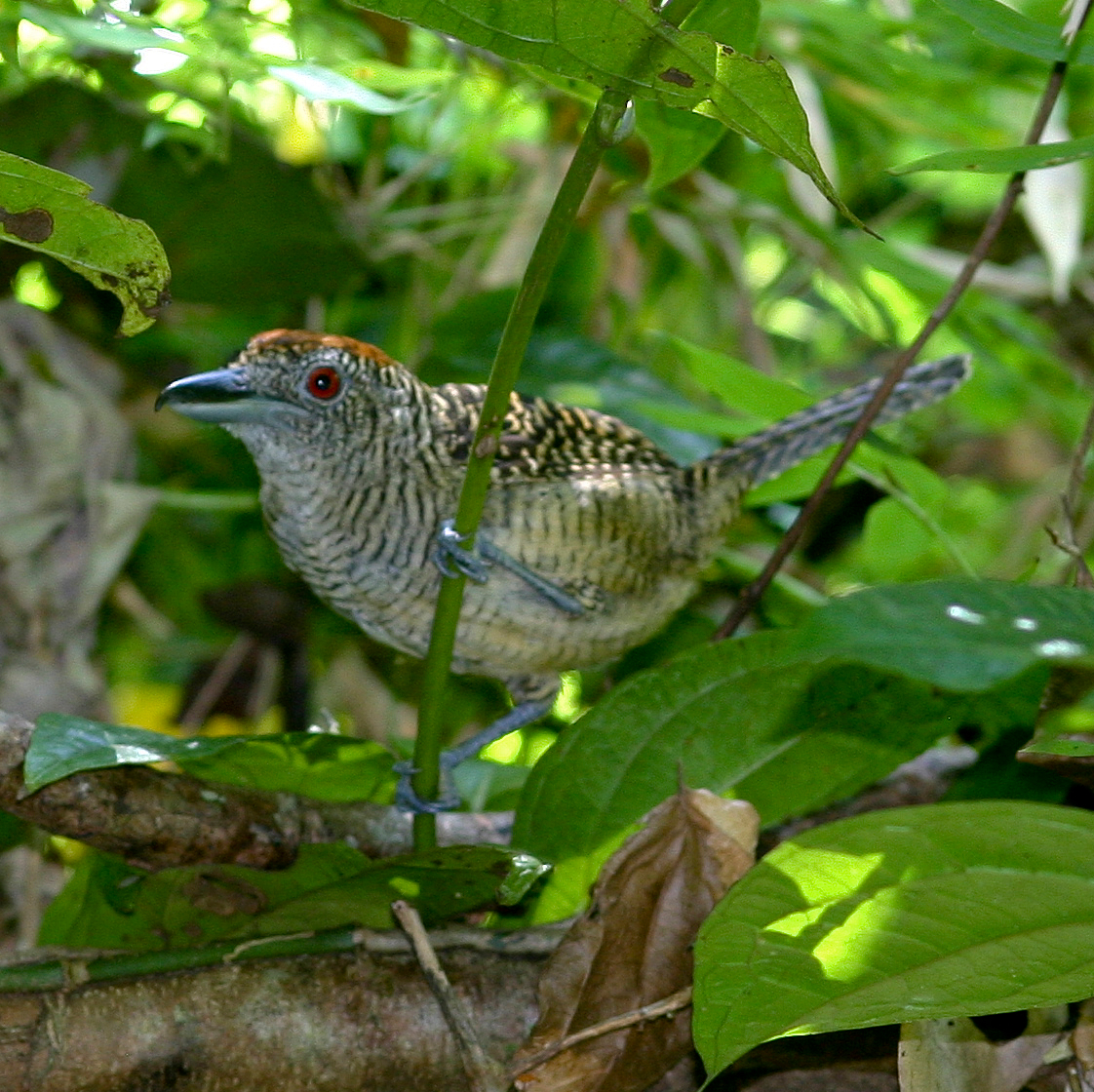
- Female in Panama

Conservation status
- Least Concern (IUCN 3.1)

Scientific classification
- Kingdom: Animalia
- Phylum: Chordata
- Class: Aves
- Order: Passeriformes
- Family: Thamnophilidae
- Genus: Cymbilaimus
- Species: C. lineatus

Binomial name
- Cymbilaimus lineatus (Leach, 1814)

= Fasciated antshrike =

Species of bird

The fasciated antshrike (Cymbilaimus lineatus) is a species of bird in subfamily Thamnophilinae of family Thamnophilidae, the "typical antbirds". It is found in Central America from Honduras south and in every mainland South American country except Argentina, Chile, Paraguay, and Uruguay.

== Taxonomy and systematics ==
The fasciated antshrike has three subspecies, the nominate C. l. lineatus (Leach, 1814), C. l. fasciatus (Ridgway, 1884), and C. l. intermedius (Hartert & Goodson, 1917). What is now the bamboo antshrike (C. sanctaemariae) was considered another subspecies of it until the 1980s. The two are the only species in genus Cymbilaimus.

== Description ==
The fasciated antshrike is 17 to 18 cm (6.7 to 7.1 in) long and weighs 35 to 40 g (1.2 to 1.4 oz). This species exhibits significant sexual dimorphism. Both sexes of all subspecies have a red iris and a heavy bill with a hook at the end like true shrikes. Adult males of the nominate subspecies have a black forehead and crown with a few very thin white bars. The rest of their plumage is thin black and white bars. Females have a rufous crown. Most of the rest of their plumage is thin dark brown and pale yellowish brown bars; their tail is barred with dark brown and pale buff. Subadult males resemble adults but with wider white bars. Males of subspecies C. l. fasciatus have strong black and white bars on the forehead that contrast with the all-black crown. Females have brown and cinnamon bars on their tail. C. l. intermedius is similar to fasciatus but with wider pale bars on its tail. The plumages of these last two vary individually and with age which produces overlap between them.

== Distribution and habitat ==
The fasciated antshrike has a disjunct distribution. Subspecies C. l. fasciatus is the northernmost, and its range is separate from the larger area shared by the other two. It is found from El Paraíso Department in southeastern Honduras, south through Nicaragua and Costa Rica on the Caribbean slope, and through Panama on both the Caribbean and Pacific slopes though locally in the latter. Its range continues into Colombia's Magdalena River Valley, east into northwestern Venezuela, and south along the Pacific slope into northwestern Ecuador as far as northern Los Ríos Province. Subspecies C. l. intermedius is found from southern Colombia and Venezuela south through eastern Ecuador and eastern Peru into Bolivia and from that western limit east into northwestern and southern Amazonian Brazil as far as Tocantins and Goiás. The nominate subspecies C. l. lineatus is found from eastern Bolívar state in Venezuela east through Guyana and Suriname into French Guiana and south into Amazonian Brazil north of the Amazon between the Branco and Negro rivers.

The fasciated antshrike inhabits evergreen forest both primary and secondary in the lowlands and Andean foothills. In Central America it tends to be in second growth and thickets rather than the forest interior. Elsewhere it does occur in the forest interior but also frequents the forest edge. In all areas it favors vine tangles and dense mid-storey vegetation. In elevation it occurs below 400 m (1,300 ft) in Honduras; in most of the rest of its range it occurs below 800 m (2,600 ft). It reaches 1,200 m (3,900 ft) in Brazil and Costa Rica, 1,400 m (4,600 ft) in Colombia, 1,000 m (3,300 ft) in Ecuador and Peru (though locally to 1,500 m (4,900 ft) in the latter), and 1,300 m (4,300 ft) in Venezuela. The ranges of the fasciated and bamboo antshrikes overlap but the bamboo generally occurs at higher elevations than the fasciated.

== Behavior ==
=== Movement ===
The fasciated antshrike is presumed to be a year-round resident throughout its range.

=== Feeding ===
The fasciated antshrike feeds primarily on large insects of several families; its diet also includes other arthropods like spiders, small lizards, frogs, and small amounts of fruit. It forages singly or in pairs and sometimes joins mixed-species feeding flocks as they pass through its territory. It typically feeds in vine clusters and near tree trunks between 5 and 20 m (15 and 65 ft) above the ground, but will also sometimes descend lower. It hops sluggishly through vegetation taking prey by reaching, lunging, and making short sallies from a perch. It will also follow army ants to take prey flushed by them, but they are not obligate ant-followers.

=== Breeding ===
The fasciated antshrike's breeding season varies geographically but has not been fully defined. It spans April to June in Costa Rica and July to November in Amazonian Brazil; recently fledged young were noted in the Guianas in September and October. Its nest is a cup made from plant and fungal fibers attached by its rim in a branch fork. It is typically placed 2 to 10 m (7 to 30 ft) above the ground and hidden by foliage. The usual clutch is two eggs; the eggs are creamy white with blotches that range from lilac to olivaceous brown. Both parents incubate the clutch during the day and the female alone at night. The incubation period, time to fledging, and other details of parental care are not known.

=== Vocalization ===
The fasciated antshrike's song is "an evenly paced series of 3–10 plaintive, lazily delivered whistles, notes longer than spaces, middle notes sometimes longer and at slightly higher pitch". The notes have been described as sounding like "weh". One author renders the song as "cü-ü, cü-ü, cü-ü..." and another as "weeo wEEo wEEo weeo". The species' calls include a "rattle-like chatter" and a "plaintive downsliding whistle" that are sometimes mixed in a series. Because it mostly stays high in dense vegetation it is more often heard than seen.

== Status ==
The IUCN has assessed the fasciated antshrike as being of Least Concern. It has an extremely large range; its estimated population of at least 500,000 mature individuals is believed to be decreasing. No immediate threats have been identified. It is considered uncommon to common in most of its range though rare to uncommon in Honduras and parts of Costa Rica. Its range includes many protected areas and "vast areas of unprotected but still intact suitable habitat, particularly in Amazon Basin and Guianan regions".
