= Tepuihyla luteolabris =

Conservation status
- Vulnerable (IUCN 3.1)

Scientific classification
- Kingdom: Animalia
- Phylum: Chordata
- Class: Amphibia
- Order: Anura
- Family: Hylidae
- Genus: Tepuihyla
- Species: T. luteolabris

Binomial name
- Tepuihyla luteolabris (Ayarzagüena, Señaris, and Gorzula, 1993)

Synonyms
- Osteocephalus luteolabris Ayarzagüena, Señaris, and Gorzula, 1993 "1992"; Tepuihyla celsae Mijares-Urrutia, Manzanilla, and La Marca, 1999

Species of frog

Tepuihyla luteolabris is a species of frog in the family Hylidae endemic to Venezuela where it can be found on a number of tepui.

== Habitat ==
Scientists have seen this species in meadows on two mountains in the tepui highlands: Marahuaca Norte in Amazonas and Cerro Galicia in Sierra de San Luis. They found it 2,550 m (8,370 ft) above sea level.

Scientists found the frog inside a protected park, Duida-Marahuaka National Park

== Threats ==
The IUCN classifies this frog as vulnerable to extinction. Climate change may harm this frog by causing changes in vegetation and in the humidity that it needs to reproduce. Viral, bacterial, and fungal pathogens can also harm this species.

Scientists recommend germplasm banking and captive breeding programs.

== Sub-populations ==
Tepuihyla celsae, assessed as data deficient by the International Union for Conservation of Nature, is now considered a junior synonym of Tepuihyla luteolabris.
