= Caura River =

Caura River may refer to:

- The Caura River (Trinidad and Tobago) on the island of Trinidad, in the country of Trinidad and Tobago;
- The Caura River (Venezuela), a tributary of the Orinoco in Bolivar State, Venezuela.
