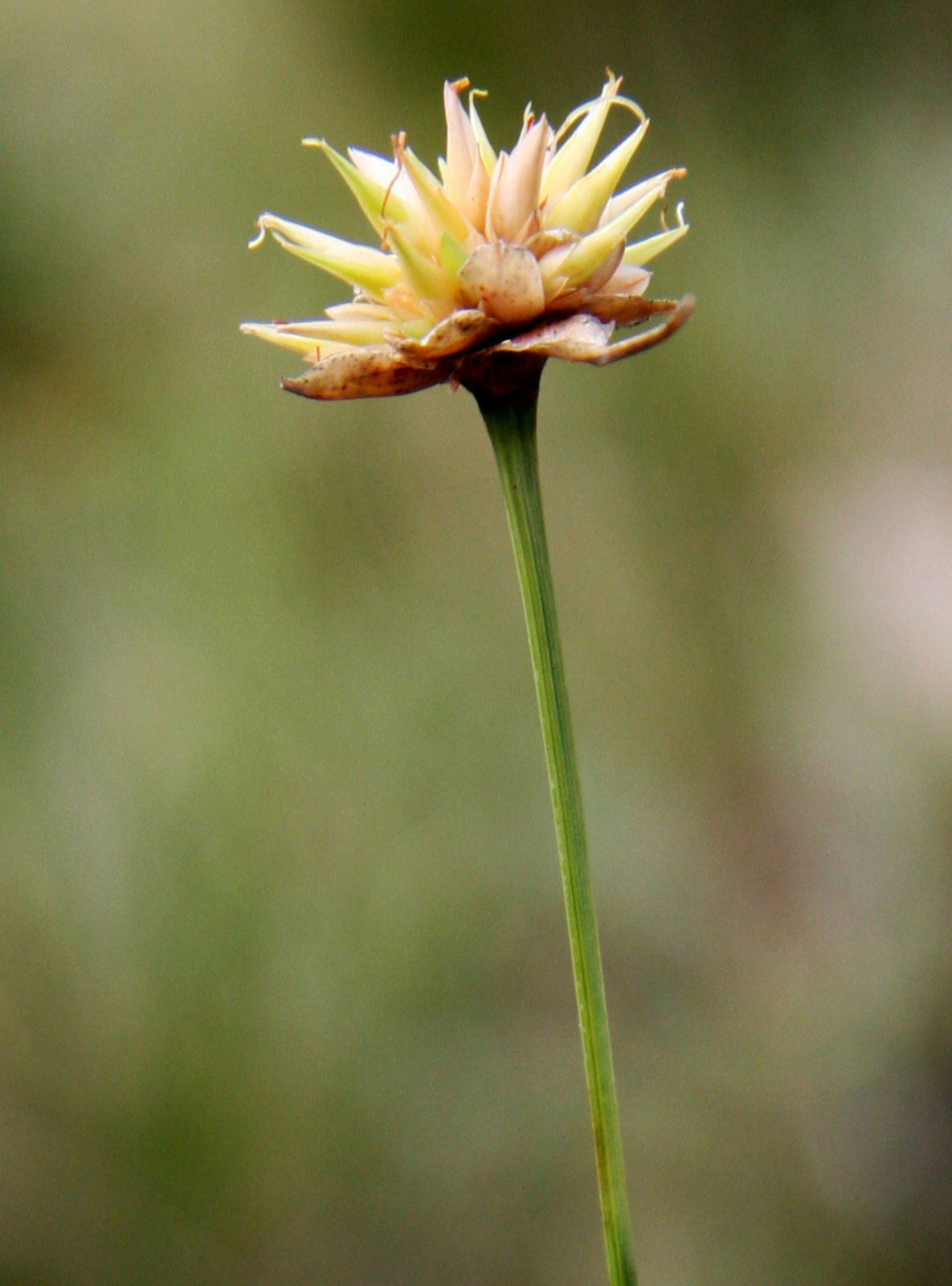

Scientific classification
- Kingdom: Plantae
- Clade: Tracheophytes
- Clade: Angiosperms
- Clade: Monocots
- Clade: Commelinids
- Order: Poales
- Family: Cyperaceae
- Genus: Rhynchospora
- Species: R. globosa

Binomial name
- Rhynchospora globosa (Kunth) Roem. & Schult. (1817)

Varieties
- R. globosa var. tenuifolia León (1946); R. globosa var. globosa

Synonyms
- Synonymy: Cephaloschoenus globosus (Kunth) Nees (1834); Chaetospora globosa Kunth (1816); Schoenus globosus (Kunth) Willd. ex Kunth (1837); Cephaloschoenus armeria Nees (1834); Cephaloschoenus marginatus Liebm. (1850); Cephaloschoenus pohlianus Nees (1842); Rhynchospora cephalantha A.Rich. (1850); Rhynchospora epiglobosa C.B.Clarke (1908); Rhynchospora marginata (Liebm.) Steud. (1855); Rhynchospora pohliana (Nees) Steud. (1855); Rhynchospora presleana Steud. (1855); Schoenus cerasiformis Poir. (1817); Xyris triquetra Kuntze (1891)

= Rhynchospora globosa =

Savannah starlet

Species of plant

Rhynchospora globosa, known by the Spanish common name of estrellita de sabana ("savannah starlet"), is a member of the sedge family, Cyperaceae. It is a perennial herb, found throughout the tropics of Central and South America. The variant R. globosa var. tenuifolia is endemic to Cuba.
