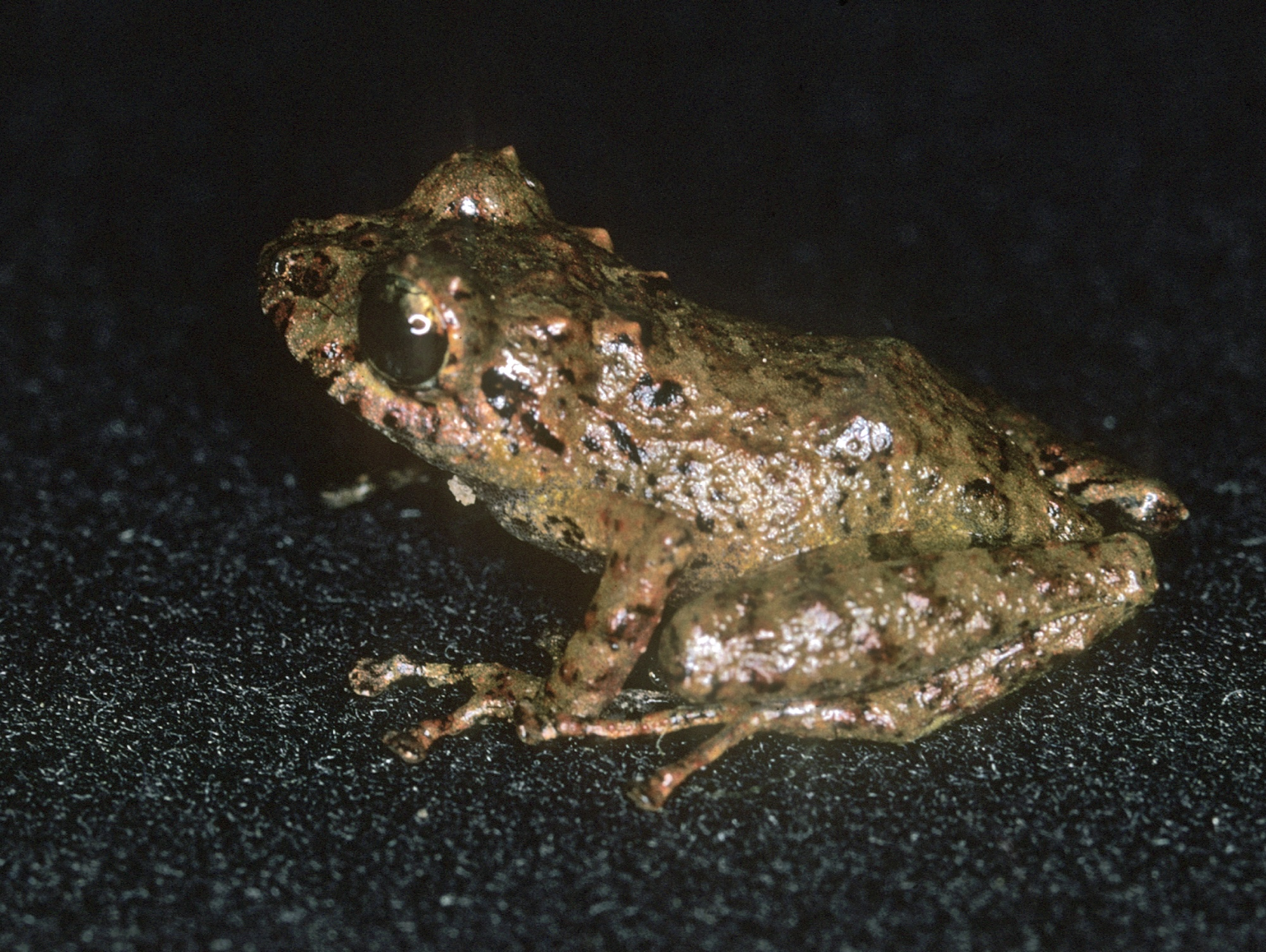
- Pristimantis pulvinatus

Conservation status
- Least Concern (IUCN 3.1)

Scientific classification
- Kingdom: Animalia
- Phylum: Chordata
- Class: Amphibia
- Order: Anura
- Clade: Brachycephaloidea
- Family: Craugastoridae
- Genus: Pristimantis
- Species: P. pulvinatus

Binomial name
- Pristimantis pulvinatus (Rivero, 1968)

Synonyms
- Eleutherodactylus pulvinatus Rivero, 1968

= Pristimantis pulvinatus =

Species of frog

Pristimantis pulvinatus is a species of frog in the family Strabomantidae. It is found in French Guiana, Guyana, Venezuela, and possibly Brazil. Its natural habitats are tropical moist lowland forests and moist montane forests.
