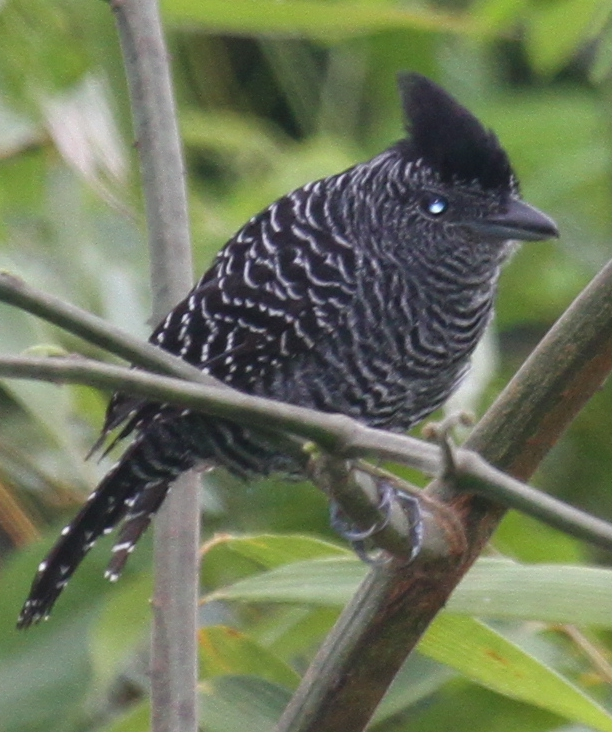

Conservation status
- Least Concern (IUCN 3.1)

Scientific classification
- Kingdom: Animalia
- Phylum: Chordata
- Class: Aves
- Order: Passeriformes
- Family: Thamnophilidae
- Genus: Cymbilaimus
- Species: C. sanctaemariae

Binomial name
- Cymbilaimus sanctaemariae Gyldenstolpe, 1941

= Bamboo antshrike =

Species of bird

The bamboo antshrike (Cymbilaimus sanctaemariae) is a species of bird in subfamily Thamnophilinae of family Thamnophilidae, the "typical antbirds". It is found in Bolivia, Brazil, and Peru.

== Taxonomy and systematics ==
Until the 1980s what is now the bamboo antshrike was treated as a subspecies of the fasciated antshrike (C. lineatus). The two are the only species in genus Cymbilaimus. The bamboo antshrike is monotypic.

== Description ==
The bamboo antshrike is 16 to 17 cm (6.3 to 6.7 in) long and weighs 28 to 33 g (0.99 to 1.2 oz). This species exhibits significant sexual dimorphism. Both sexes have a small crest, a dark brown iris, and a somewhat heavy bill with a hook at the end like true shrikes. Adult males have a black forehead and crown; the rest of their plumage is thin black and white bars. Females have a rufous crown with black tips on the crest feathers. Their upperparts and tail have thin dark brown and pale yellowish brown bars, their throat is plain buffy white, and the rest of their underparts are mostly plain cinnamon-buff with darker barring on the sides and flanks.

== Distribution and habitat ==
The bamboo antshrike is found in the western Amazon Basin of southeastern Peru, western Brazil, and northwestern Bolivia. In Peru it occurs in the departments of Ucayali, Cuzco, Madre de Dios, and Puno. In Brazil it occurs in Acre and Rondônia states, and in Bolivia the departments of Pando, La Paz, and Beni.

The bamboo antshrike almost exclusively inhabits stands of bamboo, typically of genus Guadua, in humid lowland and foothill forest. There it favors the upper levels of the bamboo. It sometimes is found in dense tangles of vines in floodplain forest (even with no bamboo), where it is more broadly seen from the mid-storey to the canopy. In elevation it ranges up to about 1,450 m (4,800 ft).

== Behavior ==
=== Movement ===
The bamboo antshrike is presumed to be a year-round resident throughout its range.

=== Feeding ===
The bamboo antshrike's diet has not been detailed but is known to include insects. It forages singly or in pairs and occasionally joins mixed-species feeding flocks as they pass through its territory. It forages mostly in the crown of bamboo stands but also in vine tangles; it may go as high as 20 m (65 ft) above the ground in trees above bamboo stands. It feeds mostly by gleaning or making short sallies from a perch during pauses while hopping along branches and bamboo stems. It occasionally investigates clusters of dead leaves.

=== Breeding ===
Nothing is known about the bamboo antshrike's breeding biology.

=== Vocalization ===
The bamboo antshrike's song is "a loud, slightly descending series of 8-15 ringing metallic tchink notes". Its calls are "a sharp tchew! note" that is often made in a series, "a thin, dry rattle", and "a whining ewwee?".

== Status ==
The IUCN has assessed the bamboo antshrike as being of Least Concern. It has a fairly large range; its population size is not known and is believed to be decreasing. No immediate threats have been identified. It is considered fairly common in appropriate habitat, which however is patchily distributed. "Brazilian populations, particularly those in Rondônia, could be at risk as a result of complete deforestation in some areas."
