= Leptodactylus sabanensis =

Conservation status
- Least Concern (IUCN 3.1)

Scientific classification
- Kingdom: Animalia
- Phylum: Chordata
- Class: Amphibia
- Order: Anura
- Family: Leptodactylidae
- Genus: Leptodactylus
- Species: L. sabanensis

Binomial name
- Leptodactylus sabanensis Heyer, 1994

Species of frog

Leptodactylus sabanensis is a species of frog in the family Leptodactylidae. It is also referred to by the common name Gran Sabana Thin-Toed Frog. It is found in Venezuela, possibly Brazil, and possibly Guyana.

== Habitat ==
This frog lives in grassy places, cloud forests, and evergreen forests. Scientists have observed it between 800 and 1250 meters above sea level.

Most of these frogs live in a protected places: Parque Nacional Canaima.

== Reproduction ==
This frog makes a foam nest for its eggs. The tadpoles develop in water.

== Threats ==
The IUCN and Venezuelan Fauna Red Book both classify this species as least concern of extinction.
