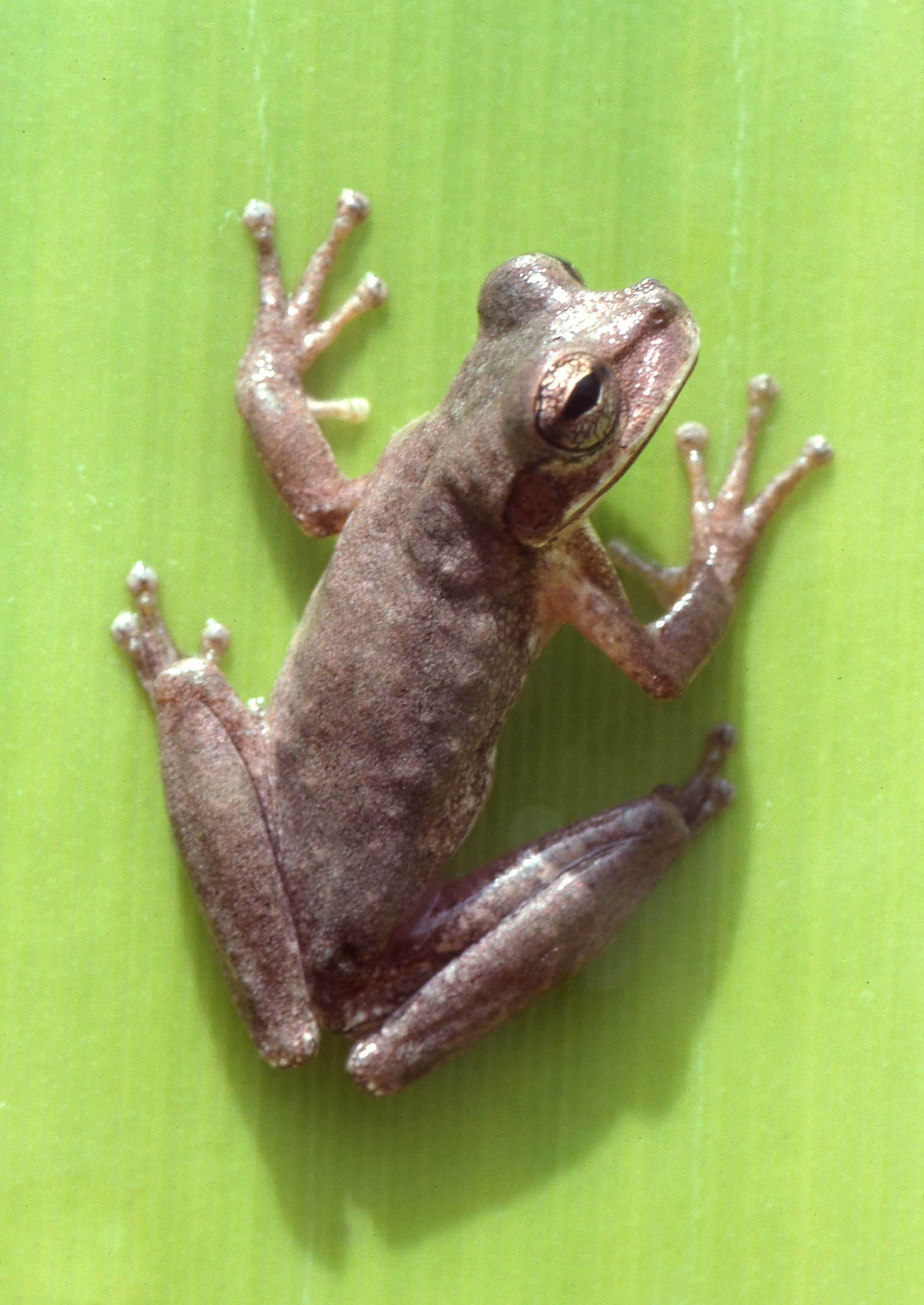

Conservation status
- Near Threatened (IUCN 3.1)

Scientific classification
- Kingdom: Animalia
- Phylum: Chordata
- Class: Amphibia
- Order: Anura
- Family: Hylidae
- Genus: Tepuihyla
- Species: T. rodriguezi

Binomial name
- Tepuihyla rodriguezi (Rivero, 1968)

Synonyms
- Hyla rodriguezi Rivero, 1968; Osteocephalus rodriguezi (Rivero, 1968); Osteocephalus galani Ayarzagüena, Señaris, and Gorzula, 1993 "1992"; Tepuihyla galani (Ayarzagüena, Señaris, and Gorzula, 1993); Osteocephalus rimarum Ayarzagüena, Señaris, and Gorzula, 1993 "1992"; Tepuihyla galani (Ayarzagüena, Señaris, and Gorzula, 1993); Tepuihyla rimarum (Ayarzagüena, Señaris, and Gorzula, 1993); Tepuihyla talbergae Duellman and Yoshpa, 1996

= Tepuihyla rodriguezi =

Species of frog

Tepuihyla rodriguezi, also known as the Rodriguez's Amazon treefrog, is a species of frog in the family Hylidae found in southeastern Venezuela and Guyana.

Tepuihyla galani, assessed as "near threatened" by the International Union for Conservation of Nature. is now considered a junior synonym of Tepuihyla rodriguezi.
