= Cerro Jaua =

Mountain in Venezuela

Coordinates: 4.7555°N 64.5075°W

Cerro Jaua is a tepui in Bolivar State, Venezuela. The mountain has a height of 2395 meters, It was included in Jaua-Sarisariñama National Park which has been subsumed within Caura National Park.

== Wildlife ==
Cerro Jaua, like some other tepuis, has endemic frog species. These include Anomaloglossus ayarzaguenai (La Marca 1996), Stefania oculosa (Señaris, Ayarzagüena, and Gorzula, 1997) and Stefania percristata (Señaris, Ayarzagüena, and Gorzula, 1997).
