= Stefania percristata =

Conservation status
- Vulnerable (IUCN 3.1)

Scientific classification
- Kingdom: Animalia
- Phylum: Chordata
- Class: Amphibia
- Order: Anura
- Family: Hemiphractidae
- Genus: Stefania
- Species: S. percristata

Binomial name
- Stefania percristata Señaris, Ayarzaguena & Gorzula, 1997

Species of frog

Stefania percristata (Spanish: rana stefania de Jaua) is a species of frog in the family Hemiphractidae. It is endemic to Venezuela and only known from its type locality, Cerro Jaua in Bolívar State.

== Habitat ==
This frog occurs along streams at the top of the tepui. It is a nocturnal species found on branches of vegetation 0.3–1 m (1 ft 0 in – 3 ft 3 in) above the ground.

This frog lives in forests with tall trees and thick understory. Scientists know the frog exclusively from its type locality, Tepui Jaua, 1,600 m (5,200 ft) above sea level.

== Reproduction ==
The female frogs carry their eggs on their backs.

== Conservation and threats ==
The IUCN classifies this frog as vulnerable and the Venezuelan Fauna Red List classifies it as data deficient. Climate change could harm this frog by altering the humidity and plant life that it needs to reproduce successfully. Virusal, bacterial, and fungal pathogens could also harm.
