= Caura National Park =

Protected area in Venezuela

Caura National Park Parque nacional Caura
- IUCN category II (national park)
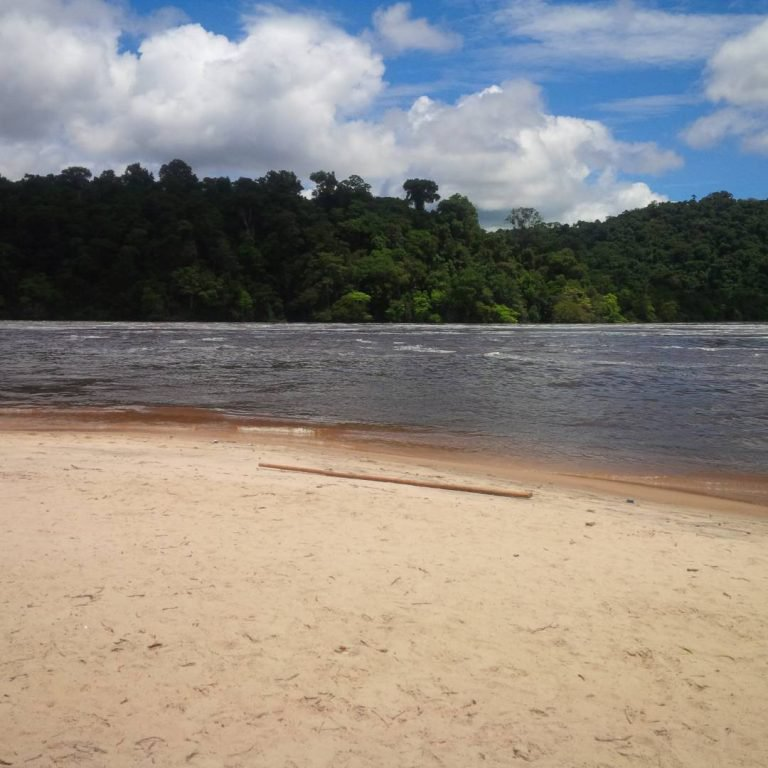

- Location within Venezuela
- Location: Venezuela
- Coordinates: 7°38′08″N 64°52′59″W
- Area: 75,340 km^{2} (29,090 sq mi)
- Established: 2017

The Caura National Park (Spanish: Parque nacional Caura) is a protected area with the status of National Park in Venezuela. With an area of 7,534,000 ha. (75,340 km^{2}) it is the largest park in the country and the most recently created (2017).

The Caura River is a tributary of the Orinoco and drains an area of the Guianan Highlands moist forests.

== History ==
In 1968 the government of Raúl Leoni decreed the creation of several protected spaces including forest reserves that include the Caura Area; in 2008 the government of Hugo Chávez created the Caura Plan to protect the resources of this river basin.

Finally in March 2017 the administration of Nicolás Maduro decreed the creation of the Caura National Park to preserve the spaces of this extensive region between the states of Bolívar and Amazonas. Its first management plan was presented in March 2018.

== Ecosystem ==
=== Flora ===
This reserve is located in the life zone of the tropical rainforest. The most important plant species are cabimo oil, carob tree, araguaney, mahogany and carapa, among many others, with a surface of 7.534.000 Ha. (75.340 km^{2}), average annual temperature of 32 °C (90 °F) and average annual rainfall of 2,271 mm (89.4 in).

=== Fauna ===
The representative fauna of the Caura National Park includes tapirs (Tapirus terrestris), white-cheeked peccary (Tayassu pecari), white-tailed turkeys (Crax alector) and red-tailed turkeys (Mitu tomentosum), the anteater (Myrmecophaga tridactyla), the limpet (Cuniculus paca), the beak (Myoprocta pratti), the collared peccary (Pecari tajacu), the yellow-bellied spider monkey (Ateles belzebuth), rabipelados (Didelphis marsupialis), cachicamos (Dasipus spp) and deer and cranes (among other galliform birds). It is also home to large carnivores such as the jaguar (Panthera onca), puma (Puma concolor) and tayra (Eira barbara). Many of these populations are affected by hunting pressure due to population growth, according to research by the University of Washington and the Wildlife Conservation Society published in 2016.

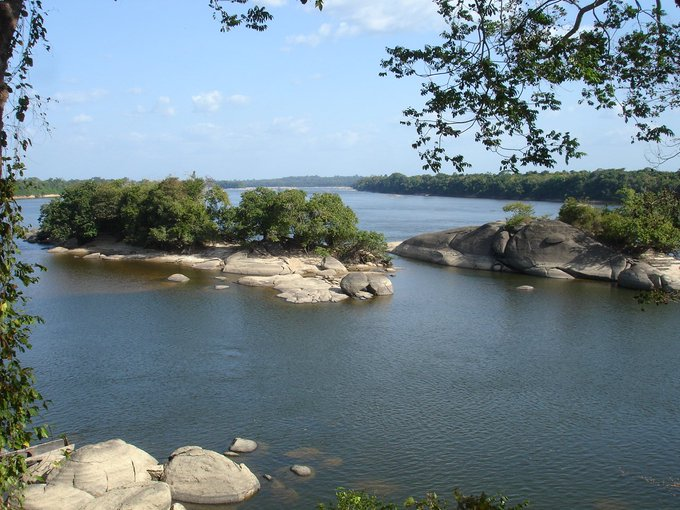
The main river

== See also ==
- List of national parks of Venezuela
- Canaima National Park
