= Stefania ayangannae =

Conservation status
- Vulnerable (IUCN 3.1)

Scientific classification
- Kingdom: Animalia
- Phylum: Chordata
- Class: Amphibia
- Order: Anura
- Family: Hemiphractidae
- Genus: Stefania
- Species: S. ayangannae

Binomial name
- Stefania ayangannae MacCulloch and Lathrop, 2002

Species of frog

Stefania ayangannae, also known as the Ayanganna stefania, is a species of frog in the family Hemiphractidae. Formally described in 2002, it is named after Mount Ayanganna, its type locality. It is endemic to Guyana, where it is found only on the tepuís of Mount Ayanganna and Mount Wokomung. It inhabits high-elevation forest at both localities, being found at elevations of 1,234–1,698 m (4,049–5,571 ft). It is classified as being vulnerable by the IUCN due its small range and the threat gold mining and climate change pose to its habitat.

== Taxonomy ==
Stefania ayangannae was formally described in 2002 based on an adult male specimen from Mount Ayanganna in Guyana. It is named after its type locality. It has the English common name Ayanganna stefania.

Stefania ayangannae is part of the S. evansi species group.

== Distribution and ecology ==
Stefania ayangannae is endemic to Guyana, where it is found only in the Pacaraima Mountains, on the tepuís of Mount Ayanganna and Mount Wokomung. It is an inhabitant of high-elevation forests. It has been recorded from elevations of 1,234–1,698 m (4,049–5,571 ft). It has been observed on low vegetation and in bromeliads, which scientists may believe may protect the frogs from strong wind.

Like other Stefania frogs, females of Stefania ayangannae carry eggs on their back using an adhesive mucus. These eggs hatch via direct development into froglets, which continue to live on the female's back for a brief time period before leaving. Clutches in Stefania coxi have four to nine eggs. These eggs are released by the female while raising her rump slightly. The male, holding on to the forelimbs in axillary amplexus, arranges these eggs on the female's back using his legs. Once the eggs are properly positioned, the female releases a fluid from a protuberance of skin on her cloaca; this fluid may form the adhesive that fixes the eggs in place.

== Conservation ==
Stefania ayangannae is classified as being vulnerable by the IUCN due its small range and several threats to its habitat. The frog has a stable population and is the most common Stefania at both tepuís it is known from. Although both the locations that the species occurs in are currently largely untouched, they are affected by low levels of gold mining. Satellite data suggests that mining currently occurs at elevations lower than those inhabited by this frog, but future expansion upwards could threaten the frog on both Mount Ayanganna and Mount Wokomung. The species is also threatened by the impacts of climate change, which tepuís are especially vulnerable to. Temperature rises associated with climate change are predicted to reduce suitable habitat for both the frog and other species that inhabit tepuís. Neither of the localities inhabited by this frog are currently protected.
