= Stefania coxi =

Conservation status
- Vulnerable (IUCN 3.1)

Scientific classification
- Kingdom: Animalia
- Phylum: Chordata
- Class: Amphibia
- Order: Anura
- Family: Hemiphractidae
- Genus: Stefania
- Species: S. coxi

Binomial name
- Stefania coxi MacCulloch & Lathrop, 2002

Species of frog

Stefania coxi, also known as Cox's stefania, is a species of frog in the family Hemiphractidae. Formally described in 2002, it is named after Carter J. Cox, a member of the expedition that first documented the species. It is endemic to Guyana, where it is found only on the tepuís of Mount Ayanganna and Mount Wokomung. It inhabits high-elevation forest at both localities, being found at elevations of 1,490–1,700 m (4,890–5,580 ft), and seems to prefer low canopy and summit habitats. It is classified as being vulnerable by the IUCN due its small range and the threat gold mining and climate change pose to its habitat.

== Taxonomy ==
Stefania coxi was formally described in 2002 based on an adult female specimen from Mount Ayanganna in Guyana. It is named after Carter J. Cox, a member of the expedition that first documented the species. It has the English common name Cox's stefania and the Spanish common name Rana Stefania de Cox.

Stefania coxi is part of the S. goini species group.

== Distribution and ecology ==
Stefania coxi is endemic to Guyana, where it is found only in the Pacaraima Mountains, on the tepuís of Mount Ayanganna and Mount Wokomung. It is an inhabitant of high-elevation forests, preferring low canopy and summit habitats on the tepuís. It has been recorded from elevations of 1,490–1,700 m (4,890–5,580 ft). It has been observed on low mossy branches and bromeliads.

Like other Stefania frogs, females of Stefania coxi carry eggs on their back using an adhesive mucus. These eggs hatch via direct development into froglets, which continue to live on the female's back for a brief time period before leaving. Clutches in Stefania coxi have four to six eggs.

== Conservation ==
Stefania coxi is classified as being vulnerable by the IUCN due its small range and several threats to its habitat. Although both the locations that the species occurs in are currently largely untouched, they are affected by low levels of gold mining. Satellite data suggests that mining currently occurs at elevations lower than those inhabited by this frog, but future expansion upwards could threaten the frog on both Mount Ayanganna and Mount Wokomung. The species is also threatened by the impacts of climate change, which tepuís are especially vulnerable to. Temperature rises associated with climate change are predicted to reduce suitable habitat for both the frog and other species that inhabit tepuís. None of the localities inhabited by this frog are currently protected.
