= Stefania ackawaio =

Conservation status
- Vulnerable (IUCN 3.1)

Scientific classification
- Kingdom: Animalia
- Phylum: Chordata
- Class: Amphibia
- Order: Anura
- Family: Hemiphractidae
- Genus: Stefania
- Species: S. ackawaio

Binomial name
- Stefania ackawaio MacCulloch & Lathrop, 2002

Species of frog

Stefania ackawaio is a species of frog in the family Hemiphractidae. Formally described in 2002, it is named after the Ackawaio people, who are indigenous to its type locality. It is endemic to Guyana, where it is found only on the tepuís of Mount Ayanganna and Mount Wokomung. It inhabits high elevation tropical forest at both localities, being found at elevations of 1,490–1,550 m (4,890–5,090 ft) at Ayanganna and 1,234–1,411 m (4,049–4,629 ft) at Wokomung, and seems to prefer open-canopy forest habitats. It is classified as being vulnerable by the IUCN due its small range and the threat gold mining and climate change pose to its habitat.

== Taxonomy ==
Stefania ackawaio was formally described in 2002 based on an adult male specimen from Mount Ayanganna in Guyana. It is named after the Ackawaio people, who are indigenous to its type locality and aided the survey that first documented the frog. It has the English common name Ackawaio stefania.

Stefania ackawaio is part of the S. evansi species group.

== Distribution and ecology ==
Stefania ackawaio is endemic to Guyana, where it is found only on the tepuís of Mount Ayanganna and Mount Wokomung. Although an inhabitant of high elevation tropical forest in both localities, it seems to be considerably more common on Mount Wokomung, which may be due to a preference for the more open-canopy forest habitat found there. It has been recorded from elevations of 1,490–1,550 m (4,890–5,090 ft) at Ayanganna and 1,234–1,411 m (4,049–4,629 ft) at Wokomung. It has been observed on low vegetation at night.

Like other Stefania frogs, females of Stefania ackawaio carry eggs on their back using an adhesive mucus. These eggs hatch via direct development into froglets, which continue to live on the female's back for a brief time period before leaving.

== Conservation ==
Stefania ackawaio is classified as being vulnerable by the IUCN due its small range and several threats to its habitat. Although both the locations that the species occurs in are currently largely untouched, they are affected by low levels of gold mining. Satellite data suggests that mining currently occurs at elevations lower than those inhabited by this frog, but future expansion upwards could threaten the frog on both Mount Ayanganna and Mount Wokomung. The species is also threatened by the impacts of climate change, which tepuís are especially vulnerable to. Temperature rises associated with climate change are predicted to reduce suitable habitat for both the frog and other species that inhabit tepuís. None of the localities inhabited by this frog are currently protected.
