= Stefania woodleyi =

Conservation status
- Data Deficient (IUCN 3.1)

Scientific classification
- Kingdom: Animalia
- Phylum: Chordata
- Class: Amphibia
- Order: Anura
- Family: Hemiphractidae
- Genus: Stefania
- Species: S. woodleyi

Binomial name
- Stefania woodleyi Rivero, 1968

Species of frog

Stefania woodleyi (Woodley's frog or Woodley's stefania) is a species of frog in the family Hemiphractidae. It is endemic to the eastern part of the Pakaraima Mountains in Guyana, including Mount Wokomung and Mount Ayanganna.

== Description ==
Males measure 35–46 mm (1.4–1.8 in) and females 44–60 mm (1.7–2.4 in) in snout–vent length. The skin on the dorsum is shagreened to granular and medium brown in colour with irregular ochre spots or reticulations.

The female carries eggs on her back where the juveniles complete their development. There is no free-swimming tadpole stage.

== Habitat and conservation ==
Natural habitat of Stefania woodleyi is primary lowland forest at elevations of 100–900 m (330–2,950 ft) asl. It is an uncommon species usually found near streams on rocks or branches. It can co-occur with Stefania evansi.

No threats to this species have been identified; it occurs in relatively isolated and undisturbed habitats. Its range includes Kaieteur National Park, which has been subject to illegal gold and diamond mining.
