= Stefania roraimae =

Conservation status
- Endangered (IUCN 3.1)

Scientific classification
- Kingdom: Animalia
- Phylum: Chordata
- Class: Amphibia
- Order: Anura
- Family: Hemiphractidae
- Genus: Stefania
- Species: S. roraimae

Binomial name
- Stefania roraimae Duellman and Hoogmoed, 1984

Species of frog

Stefania roraimae (common names: Roraima treefrog, Roraima stefania) is a species of frog in the family Hemiphractidae. It is endemic to Guyana. Its type locality is Mount Roraima; it is also known from Mount Ayanganna and Mount Wokomung. It presumably occurs in the adjacent Venezuela and Brazil too.

== Description ==
Male Stefania roraimae grow to snout–vent length of 36–46 mm (1.4–1.8 in) and females to 36–68 mm (1.4–2.7 in). The smallest recorded independent juveniles are 19 mm (0.75 in) in snout–vent length. Reproduction is not known for this species, but presumably the females carry eggs on their backs, with the juveniles developing fully there, as known for many other species of Stefania.

== Habitat and conservation ==
Stefania roraimae are found in primary forests at altitudes of 1,234–1,550 m (4,049–5,085 ft). Its habitats are relatively remote. What threat the frog faces comes from climate change, fires, and viral, bacterial, and fungal pathogens. Scientists recommend that the government allow fewer visitors to Mt. Roraima.
