= Otophryne steyermarki =

Conservation status
- Least Concern (IUCN 3.1)

Scientific classification
- Kingdom: Animalia
- Phylum: Chordata
- Class: Amphibia
- Order: Anura
- Family: Microhylidae
- Genus: Otophryne
- Species: O. steyermarki

Binomial name
- Otophryne steyermarki Rivero, 1968

Synonyms
- Otophryne robusta steyermarki Rivero, 1968 "1967"

Species of frog

Otophryne steyermarki is a species of frog in the family Microhylidae. It is found in western Guyana (Mount Ayanganna, Mount Wokomung) and in the Bolívar state in eastern Venezuela (Chimantá Massif, Cerro Jaua, Mount Roraima).

== Habitat and behaviour ==
This relatively common frog is a diurnal species living at the borders of slow-flowing streams in high montane tepui habitats, from 1000–1500 metres elevation. Males call near streams, hiding in leaf-litter, between trunks, or in crevices between rocks. The tadpoles live in the bottom substrate of small ponds adjacent to streams.

== Description ==
The colour pattern is different between males and females and also between individuals. dorsum and limbs are black or dark grey with irregular, variable yellow spots. There is a yellow line from tip of snout across eyelid to groin, continuing onto anterior thigh and sometimes onto shank. Lateral surfaces are usually black or dark grey, occasionally dark orange, with yellow or orange spots, usually smaller than dorsal spots. Toe webbing is more extensive in males than in females. Male Otophryne steyermarki grow to a snout–vent length of 40–42 mm (1.6–1.7 in) and females to 42–48 mm (1.7–1.9 in).

Tadpoles grow to at least 43 mm (1.7 in) in total length. They are dark grey with white flecks and lack oral disc. Tadpoles have a spiracle that protrudes from the substrate, thus enabling respiration.
