= Stefania maccullochi =

Scientific classification
- Kingdom: Animalia
- Phylum: Chordata
- Class: Amphibia
- Order: Anura
- Family: Hemiphractidae
- Genus: Stefania
- Species: S. maccullochi

Binomial name
- Stefania maccullochi Kok, 2023

Species of frog

Stefania maccullochi is a species of frog in the family Hemiphractidae. Scientists first found this frog on Wei-Assipu-tepui in Guyana. It is a sister species to Stefania riveroi, as assessed by both morphological and osteological analysis. The describing author recommended that it should be considered critically endangered.
