= Cryptobatrachus ruthveni =

Conservation status
- Endangered (IUCN 3.1)

Scientific classification
- Kingdom: Animalia
- Phylum: Chordata
- Class: Amphibia
- Order: Anura
- Family: Hemiphractidae
- Genus: Cryptobatrachus
- Species: C. ruthveni

Binomial name
- Cryptobatrachus ruthveni Lynch, 2008

Species of amphibian

Cryptobatrachus ruthveni is a species of frogs in the family Hemiphractidae. It is endemic to the western flank of the Sierra Nevada de Santa Marta in northern Colombia. The specific name ruthveni honors Alexander Grant Ruthven, an American herpetologist who was the first one to study .

== Description ==
Adult males measure 33–45 mm (1.3–1.8 in) and adult females, based on a single specimen, 64 mm (2.5 in) in snout–vent length. The head is wider than it is long and wider than the body in females but not in males or juveniles. The snout is subacuminate in dorsal view but rounded in profile. The tympanum is larger in males than in females; the supratympanic fold is prominent. The dorsolateral folds are thin. Skin on the dorsum is finely granular with scattered larger warts. The fingers have no webbing. The finger and toe tips bear expanded disks. Subarticular adhesive pads are present. Alcohol-preserved specimens are dorsally brown with pale brown blotches on the back and cream spots on the flanks. The limbs are pale brown with darker brown bands.

Cryptobatrachus ruthveni is externally nearly indistinguishable from Cryptobatrachus boulengeri, but has more enlarged tubercles on its dorsum. An osteological difference is that C. ruthveni lacks the lateral expansion of the anterior part of the braincase seen in C. boulengeri.

Female frogs carry the eggs on their back. The eggs have direct development (i.e., there is no free-living larval stage).

== Habitat and conservation ==
Cryptobatrachus ruthveni occurs in riparian habitats in creeks at elevations of 1,000–1,600 m (3,300–5,200 ft) above sea level. It is abundant within its small known range. It is threatened by habitat loss and agrochemical pollution mainly caused by coffee plantations. It is not known to occur in protected areas.
