= Stefania riae =

Conservation status
- Near Threatened (IUCN 3.1)

Scientific classification
- Kingdom: Animalia
- Phylum: Chordata
- Class: Amphibia
- Order: Anura
- Family: Hemiphractidae
- Genus: Stefania
- Species: S. riae

Binomial name
- Stefania riae Duellman and Hoogmoed, 1984

Species of frog

Stefania riae (common name: Sarisarinama carrying frog, Spanish: rana stefania del Sarisarinama) is a species of frog in the family Hemiphractidae. This species is only known from Cerro Sarisariñama, a tepui in the Bolívar State, Venezuela.

== Etymology ==
The specific name riae honors Ria Hoogmoed-Verschoor, spouse of the second author.

Stefania riae is only known from Cerro Sarisariñama, Venezuela

== Description ==
Adult males measure 40–58 mm (1.6–2.3 in) and females 52–60 mm (2.0–2.4 in) in snout–vent length. The tympanum is visible and relatively large. The canthus rostralis is distinct. All fingers and toes have well-developed discs. The toes have basal webbing. There are four color forms without consistent relationship with a specimen's sex. Possible patterns are 1) mostly pale brown, possibly with a few indistinct darker spots, 2) pattern that is other wise variable but always with paler dorsal background than dorsolateral stripes, 3) chevrons or spots on the dorsum, and 4) brown dorsum without dorsolateral stripes and chevrons, but with several dark brown spots and golden spots scattered around the head, body, and limbs. The two first forms are the most common ones.

== Habitat and conservation ==
The type series was collected from the plateau on top of Cerro Sarisarifiama at an elevation of 1,400 m (4,600 ft) above sea level. In 2002, Stefania riae was abundant in humid environments inside the Sima Humboldt (=Sima Mayor) sinkhole (but none were found from near its edge); many specimens were found on mossy walls soaked by water, bushes and plants, and on sandstone walls. None was found One specimen was found on a mossy wall near a small, slow creek on the southern slope of Sarisariñama at 1,328 m (4,357 ft). This frog has a sympatric relationship with other herps, specifically Osteocephalus taurinus, Pristimantis sarisarinama, Gonatodes superciliaris, and Anolis ortonii.

There are no known threats to this species. Cerro Sarisariñama is within the Jaua-Sarisariñama National Park.

== Reproduction ==
The female frogs carry their eggs on their backs. This species reproduces through direct development, with eggs hatching into small froglets with no free-swimming tadpole stage.
