= Cryptobatrachus pedroruizi =

Conservation status
- Endangered (IUCN 3.1)

Scientific classification
- Kingdom: Animalia
- Phylum: Chordata
- Class: Amphibia
- Order: Anura
- Family: Hemiphractidae
- Genus: Cryptobatrachus
- Species: C. pedroruizi

Binomial name
- Cryptobatrachus pedroruizi Lynch, 2008

Species of frog

Cryptobatrachus pedroruizi is a species of frog in the family Hemiphractidae. It is found in Colombia.

== Description ==
The adult male frog measures 33-47 mm in snout-vent length and the adult female frog 60-73 mm. The male frog has a larger tympanum than the female frog does.

== Habitat ==
Scientists infer that this frog lives near streams and waterfalls. Scientists have seen it between 930 m (3,050 ft) and 1,800 m (5,900 ft) above sea level.

== Reproduction ==
The female frog carries her eggs in a pouch on her back, 16-45 eggs per clutch. The young emerge out as small froglets, with no free-swimming tadpole stage.

== Threats ==
The IUCN classifies this frog as endangered. Threats include habitat loss in favor of agriculture, logging, and goat farming.

== Original description ==
- Lynch JD (2008). "A taxonomic revision of frogs of the genus Cryptobatrachus (Anura:Hemiphractidae)". Zootaxa. 1883: 28–68.
