= Stefania tamacuarina =

Conservation status
- Data Deficient (IUCN 3.1)

Scientific classification
- Kingdom: Animalia
- Phylum: Chordata
- Class: Amphibia
- Order: Anura
- Family: Hemiphractidae
- Genus: Stefania
- Species: S. tamacuarina

Binomial name
- Stefania tamacuarina Myers and Donnelly, 1997

Species of frog

Stefania tamacuarina is a species of frog in the family Hemiphractidae. It is found in the Sierra Tapirapecó in the Amazonas state of Venezuela as well as in the adjacent Amazonas state of Brazil (where the range is known as Serra do Tapirapecó). The specific name tamacuarina refers to the type locality, a spur ridge north of Pico Tamacuari.

== Description ==
The type series consists of two sub-adult females measuring 43 and 50 mm (1.7 and 2.0 in) in snout–vent length; the maximum size could therefore be considerable higher. The head is slightly wider than it is long. The snout is short and rounded or nearly truncate. The tympanum is distinct, round, and relatively large. The canthus rostralis is distinct. The fingers and toes have terminal discs and the toes have basal webbing. Skin on the dorsum is weakly granular. Ground color is greenish brown to brown. There are bold, darker brown patterns, including a large, rectangular brown blotch from between the eyes backwards to the level of arm insertions. There is also a dorsolateral line made of blackish spots, running above the vaguely brown-mottled flanks. The ventrum is gray.

== Habitat and conservation ==
The species' natural habitats are montane forests at elevations of 350–1,270 m (1,150–4,170 ft) above sea level. It is nocturnal. Individuals have been found at a helipad clearing in ridge-top forest, in low vegetation near a forested stream, and on the ground in a forest bordering a river. Adults carry the eggs and juveniles on their backs. Development is direct, without free-living larval stage.

No major threats to this species are known. It occurs in the Parima Tapirapecó National Park, Venezuela. The frog's known range also contains the Alto Orinoco-Casiquiare Biosphere Reserve.

Records of Stefania tamacuarina near the border between Venezuela and Brazil.
