= O. robusta =

O. robusta may refer to:

- Obesotoma robusta, a sea snail species
- Opuntia robusta, the wheel cactus or camuesa, a plant species native to Mexico
- Otophryne robusta, the sapito robusto, a frog species found in Guyana, Venezuela and possibly Brazil

== See also ==
- Robusta
