= Stefania marahuaquensis =

Conservation status
- Near Threatened (IUCN 3.1)

Scientific classification
- Kingdom: Animalia
- Phylum: Chordata
- Class: Amphibia
- Order: Anura
- Family: Hemiphractidae
- Genus: Stefania
- Species: S. marahuaquensis

Binomial name
- Stefania marahuaquensis (Rivero, 1961)

Synonyms
- Hyla marahuaquensis Rivero, 1961

Species of frog

Stefania marahuaquensis is a species of frog in the family Hemiphractidae. It is endemic to Venezuela and known from Cerro Duida and Cerro Marahuaca, both in Amazonas State.

== Habitat and distribution ==
Adult frogs have been observed on rocks next to streams. Scientists have seen the frog between 340 and 1,200 m (1,120 and 3,940 ft) above sea level.

Scientists have seen the frogs solely in a protected park, Duida-Marahuaka National Park.

== Reproduction ==
Scientists infer that the female frogs carry their eggs on their backs and the young undergo direct development.

== Threats ==
The IUCN classifies this frog as near threatened. Climate change could harm this population because of its small range. Virusal, bacterial, and fungal pathogens also pose a threat.
