= Cryptobatrachidae =

Scientific classification
- Domain: Eukaryota
- Kingdom: Animalia
- Phylum: Chordata
- Class: Amphibia
- Order: Anura
- Family: Cryptobatrachidae

Family of frogs

Cryptobatrachidae is a family of frogs belonging to the order Anura.

Genera:

- Cryptobatrachus
- Stefania
