= Cryptobatrachus conditus =

Conservation status
- Data Deficient (IUCN 3.1)

Scientific classification
- Kingdom: Animalia
- Phylum: Chordata
- Class: Amphibia
- Order: Anura
- Family: Hemiphractidae
- Genus: Cryptobatrachus
- Species: C. conditus

Binomial name
- Cryptobatrachus conditus Lynch, 2008

Species of frog

Cryptobatrachus conditus is a species of frog in the family Hemiphractidae. It is found in Colombia.

== Habitat ==
Scientists described the frog from preserved museum specimens. They infer it lives similarly to its congeners, in forests in the Andes Mountains, especially near waterfalls. Scientists have seen this frog 1,030 m (3,380 ft) above sea level.

== Reprodution ==
Scientists believe this frog has young the same way other frogs in Cryptobatrachus do: The female frog carries her eggs in a pouch on her back. The young either emerge as small froglets or she carries the tadpoles to water.

== Threats ==
The IUCN classifies this species as do not know with no known specific threats.

== Original description ==
- Lynch JD (2008). "A taxonomic revision of frogs of the genus Cryptobatrachus (Anura:Hemiphractidae)". Zootaxa (Abstract). 1883: 28–68. doi:10.11646/zootaxa.1883.1.2.
