= Stefania schuberti =

Conservation status
- Near Threatened (IUCN 3.1)

Scientific classification
- Kingdom: Animalia
- Phylum: Chordata
- Class: Amphibia
- Order: Anura
- Family: Hemiphractidae
- Genus: Stefania
- Species: S. schuberti

Binomial name
- Stefania schuberti Señaris, Ayarzaguena & Gorzula, 1997

Species of frog

Stefania schuberti is a species of frog in the family Hemiphractidae.

== Home ==
This nocturnal frog has been seen in caves and crevices, bogs, and open rocky areas. During the day, people see juvenile frogs hiding under rocks and next to streams during the day. Scientists have reported the frog between 1,750 and 2,400 m (5,740 and 7,870 ft) above sea level.

Scientists know the frog exclusively from a protected area, Canaima National Park.

== Reproduction ==
The female frogs carry their eggs on their backs. This species reproduces through direct development, hatching as a small froglet, not a free-swimming tadpole.

== Threats ==
The IUCN classifies this species as near threatened. Climate change poses a threat because it could change the humidity and plant distribution in the frog's upland habitat. Viral, bacterial, and fungal pathogens could also harm this frog.
