= Gastrotheca coeruleomaculata =

Scientific classification
- Kingdom: Animalia
- Phylum: Chordata
- Class: Amphibia
- Order: Anura
- Family: Hemiphractidae
- Genus: Gastrotheca
- Species: G. coeruleomaculata

Binomial name
- Gastrotheca coeruleomaculata (Werner, 1899)

Synonyms
- Hylodes coeruleomaculatus Werner, 1899; Gastrotheca (Gastrotheca) caeruleomaculatus(Werner, 1899); Gastrotheca coeruleomaculatus Lansac, Aguayo-Vedia, and De la Riva, 2021

Species of frog

Gastrotheca coeruleomaculata is a species of frog in the family Hemiphractidae. It is endemic to Bolivia. Scientists know it exclusively from the type locality, 2,042 m (6,699 ft) above sea level in yungas forest.

== Descriptions ==
- Werner, F (1899). "Beschreibung neuer Reptilien und Batrachier". Zoologischer Anzeiger. 22: 479–484.
- Duellman, W. E. (2015). Marsupial Frogs. Gastrotheca & Allied Genera. Baltimore: Johns Hopkins University Press.
