= Stefania satelles =

Aprada stefania tree frog

Conservation status
- Near Threatened (IUCN 3.1)

Scientific classification
- Kingdom: Animalia
- Phylum: Chordata
- Class: Amphibia
- Order: Anura
- Family: Hemiphractidae
- Genus: Stefania
- Species: S. satelles

Binomial name
- Stefania satelles Señaris, Ayarzaguena & Gorzula, 1997

Species of frog

The Aprada stefania tree frog (Stefania satelles) also known as the Aprada carrying frog and Aprada marsupial frog is a species of frog in the family Hemiphractidae. It is endemic to Venezuela.

== Habitat ==
This nocturnal frog is found in rocky places and near waterways. During the day, young frogs hide in bromeliad plants and in bogs. Scientists know this frog from the type locality in Monumento Natural Los Tepuyes, between 2,500 and 2,571 m (8,202 and 8,435 ft) above sea level. This also involves a protected area, Canaima National Park.

== Young ==
The female frogs carry their eggs on their backs and the eggs hatch into small froglets, not swimming tadpoles.

== Danger ==
Both the IUCN and the Venezuelan Fauna Red List classify this species as near threatened to extinction. Climate change could harm this frog because of its upland habitat: it cannot migrate to a higher elevation or colder area without descending into a warmer one first. Fires could also hurt this frog.

Venezuela has laws protecting the tepui highlands.
