= Stefania neblinae =

Conservation status
- Least Concern (IUCN 3.1)

Scientific classification
- Kingdom: Animalia
- Phylum: Chordata
- Class: Amphibia
- Order: Anura
- Family: Hemiphractidae
- Genus: Stefania
- Species: S. neblinae

Binomial name
- Stefania neblinae Carvalho, MacCulloch, Bonora, and Vogt, 2010

Species of amphibian

Stefania neblinae is a species of frogs of the family Hemiphractidae. It is known from the slopes of Pico da Neblina, in the Pico da Neblina National Park, on the border of Brazil and Venezuela. It represents the first record of the genus Stefania from Brazil. It is currently known only from Brazil but its range could extend into adjacent Venezuela.

== Description ==
This frog's head is longer than it is wide. About half of the toes on the back feet have webbed skin.

== Habitat ==
Scientists found this frog in dense lowland and sub-montane closed-canopy rainforests. They found the frog between 100 and 850 m (330 and 2,790 ft) above sea level.

Scientists note that the park where the frog was found, Parque Nacional do Pico da Neblina, is next to another protected place, Parque Nacional Serranía La Neblina in Venezuela.

== Reproduction ==
The female frogs carry their eggs on their backs. The frog breeds through direct development with no free-swimming tadpole stage.

== Threats ==
The IUCN classifies this species as least concern of extinction because the frog is known exclusively from a well-managed protected area.
