= Maverick Rock =

Natural rock formation in Venezuela

Coordinates: 5°09′40″N 60°46′54″W

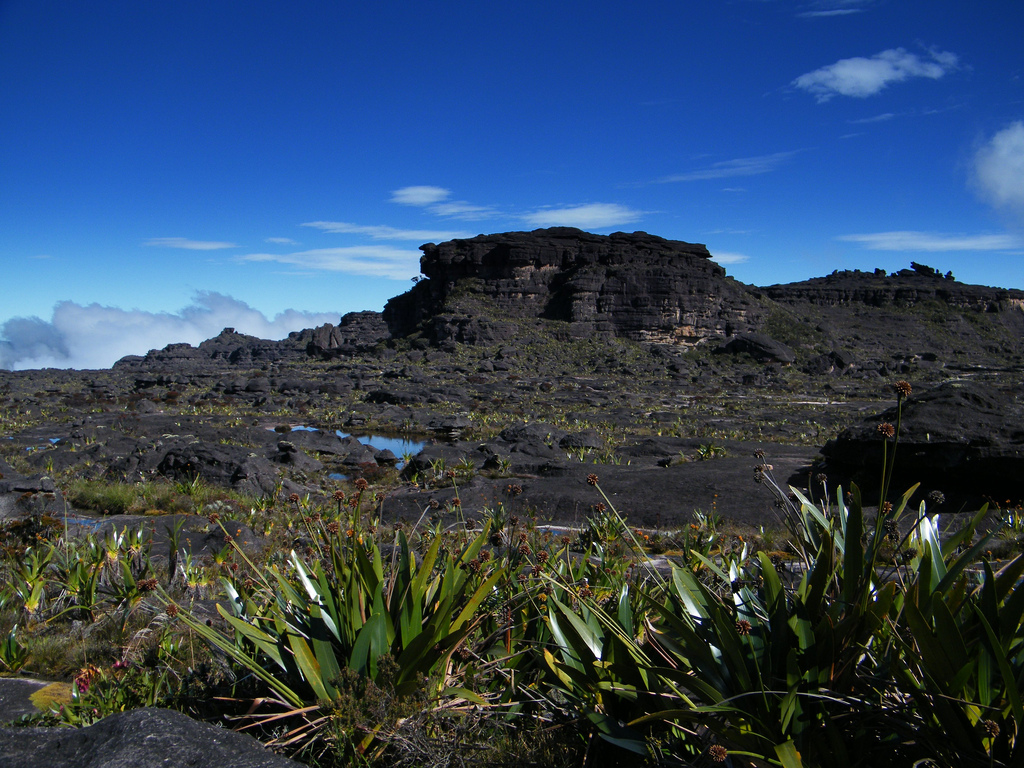
Maverick Rock, the highest point of Mount Roraima

Maverick Rock or Maverick Stone (Spanish: Roca Maverick or simply El Maverick) is a natural rock formation on top of Mount Roraima. It is the highest point of that tabletop mountain (a tepui), at 2,810 metres (9,220 ft) a.m.s.l. The rock stands near the southwestern edge of the mountain plateau. Although Mount Roraima is shared with Guyana (in an area claimed by Venezuela) and Brazil, Maverick Rock itself is entirely within Venezuela, in the state of Bolívar, of which it is the highest point.

The rock's name comes from the apparent similarity of its shape to a Ford Maverick automobile.
