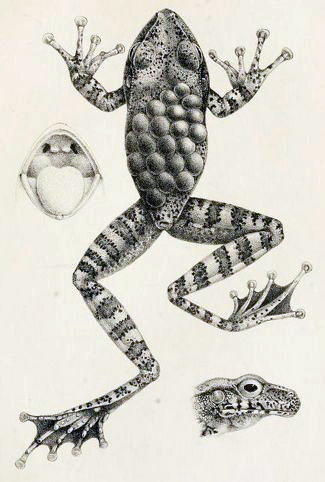
- Stefania evansi

Scientific classification
- Domain: Eukaryota
- Kingdom: Animalia
- Phylum: Chordata
- Class: Amphibia
- Order: Anura
- Family: Hemiphractidae
- Genus: Stefania; Rivero, 1968

Type species
- Hyla evansi Boulenger, 1904

Diversity
- 19 species (see text)

= Stefania =

Genus of amphibians

Stefania is a genus of frogs in the family Hemiphractidae. They are native to the highlands of the Guiana Shield in southern Venezuela, Guyana, and adjacent far northern Brazil. Most are restricted to the tepui highlands, but S. evansi also occurs in lowlands. On most mountains there are only 1–2 species from this genus, but five are known from Mount Ayanganna and the neighbouring Mount Wokomung has six species. They are usually found near streams at low levels on branches/leaves or on the ground among vegetation/rocks.

They are famous for their breeding strategy where the development from eggs to froglets is completed on the back of the female (the eggs hatch to froglets; there is no free-swimming tadpole stage). The common name carrying frog is sometimes used for Stefania species and it refers to this behavior. A comparable behavior can also be seen in the other genera in the family Hemiphractidae.

== Species ==
There are 20 Stefania species:

- Stefania ackawaio MacCulloch and Lathrop, 2002
- Stefania ayangannae MacCulloch and Lathrop, 2002
- Stefania breweri Barrio-Amorós and Fuentes-Ramos, 2003
- Stefania coxi MacCulloch and Lathrop, 2002
- Stefania evansi (Boulenger, 1904)
- Stefania ginesi Rivero, 1968
- Stefania goini Rivero, 1968
- Stefania maccullochi Kok, 2023
- Stefania marahuaquensis (Rivero, 1961)
- Stefania neblinae Carvalho, MacCulloch, Bonora, and Vogt, 2010
- Stefania oculosa Señaris, Ayarzagüena, and Gorzula, 1997
- Stefania percristata Señaris, Ayarzagüena, and Gorzula, 1997
- Stefania riae Duellman and Hoogmoed, 1984
- Stefania riveroi Señaris, Ayarzagüena, and Gorzula, 1997
- Stefania roraimae Duellman and Hoogmoed, 1984
- Stefania satelles Señaris, Ayarzagüena, and Gorzula, 1997
- Stefania scalae Rivero, 1970
- Stefania schuberti Señaris, Ayarzagüena, and Gorzula, 1997
- Stefania tamacuarina Myers and Donnelly, 1997
- Stefania woodleyi Rivero, 1968
