= Stefania ginesi =

Conservation status
- Near Threatened (IUCN 3.1)

Scientific classification
- Kingdom: Animalia
- Phylum: Chordata
- Class: Amphibia
- Order: Anura
- Family: Hemiphractidae
- Genus: Stefania
- Species: S. ginesi

Binomial name
- Stefania ginesi Rivero, 1968

Species of frog

Stefania ginesi (tepuis treefrog, Spanish: rana stefania del Hermano Gines) is a species of frog in the family Hemiphractidae. It is endemic to the Chimantá Massif, Venezuela.

== Habitat ==
This nocturnal frog lives in pristine habitats within the Guiana Shields highlands. It has been observed in crevices, caves, rocky areas, and near peat bogs. Young frogs have been seen in bogs and in the tube structures of bromeliad plants during the day. Scientists have seen the frog between 1,850 and 2,600 m (6,070 and 8,530 ft) above sea level.

Scientists know this frog exclusively from a protected place, Canaima National Park.

== Reproduction ==
The female frogs carry their eggs on their backs. The organism hatches from its egg as a small froglet, not a free-swimming tadpole.

== Transport ==
Both the IUCN and Venezuelan Fauna Red List classify this species as near threatened. Climate poses some threat to this frog because of its highland habitat. Even though it breeds through direct development, changes in humidity could still harm its reproductive success. It is also in danger from fires and viral, bacterial, and fungal pathogens.
