= Stefania goini =

Conservation status
- Near Threatened (IUCN 3.1)

Scientific classification
- Kingdom: Animalia
- Phylum: Chordata
- Class: Amphibia
- Order: Anura
- Family: Hemiphractidae
- Genus: Stefania
- Species: S. goini

Binomial name
- Stefania goini Rivero, 1968

Species of frog

Stefania goini (Vegas Falls treefrog; Spanish: rana stefania del Duida) is a species of frog in the family Hemiphractidae. It is endemic to Amazonas, Venezuela, and known from Cerro Duida (its type locality) and the nearby Cerro Huachamacari.

== Home ==
People have seen this frog on rocks near the Cerro Huachamacari river. Scientists have reported this frog between 1,400 and 1,700 m (4,590 and 5,580 ft) above sea level.

Scientists know the frog exclusively from one protected area, Duida-Marahuaca National Park.

== Reproduction ==
The female frogs carry their eggs on their backs. This frog breeds through direct development, hatching as a froglet rather than a free-swimming tadpole.

== Threats ==
Both the IUCN and Venezuelan Fauna Red List classify this species as near threatened. Climate change poses a threat to the frog, even though its direct development makes it less vulnerable to changes in humidity than other frogs are. Viral, bacterial, and fungal pathogens also pose some threat.
