= Stefania riveroi =

Yuruani stefania tree frog

Conservation status
- Vulnerable (IUCN 3.1)

Scientific classification
- Kingdom: Animalia
- Phylum: Chordata
- Class: Amphibia
- Order: Anura
- Family: Hemiphractidae
- Genus: Stefania
- Species: S. riveroi

Binomial name
- Stefania riveroi Señaris, Ayarzaguena & Gorzula, 1997

Species of frog

The Yuruani stefania tree frog (Stefania riveroi) also or known Rivero carrying frog and Yuruani marsupial frog is a species of frog in the family Hemiphractidae.

== Habitat ==
It is only known from Yuruaní tepui, a tepui on the border of Venezuela and Guyana. The frog has been seen in crevices, caves, and rocky areas, with juveniles hiding in bromeliad plants during the day. They have been seen 2,300 and 2,303 m (7,546 and 7,556 ft) above sea level.

== Reproduction ==
The female frogs carry their eggs on their backs. This species hatches out of its eggs as a small froglet with no free-swimming tadpole stage.

== Threats ==
Both the IUCN and Venezuelan Fauna Red List classify this species as vulnerable to extinction. It is threatened by climate change, because of its small range, fires, and viral, bacterial, and fungal pathogens.
