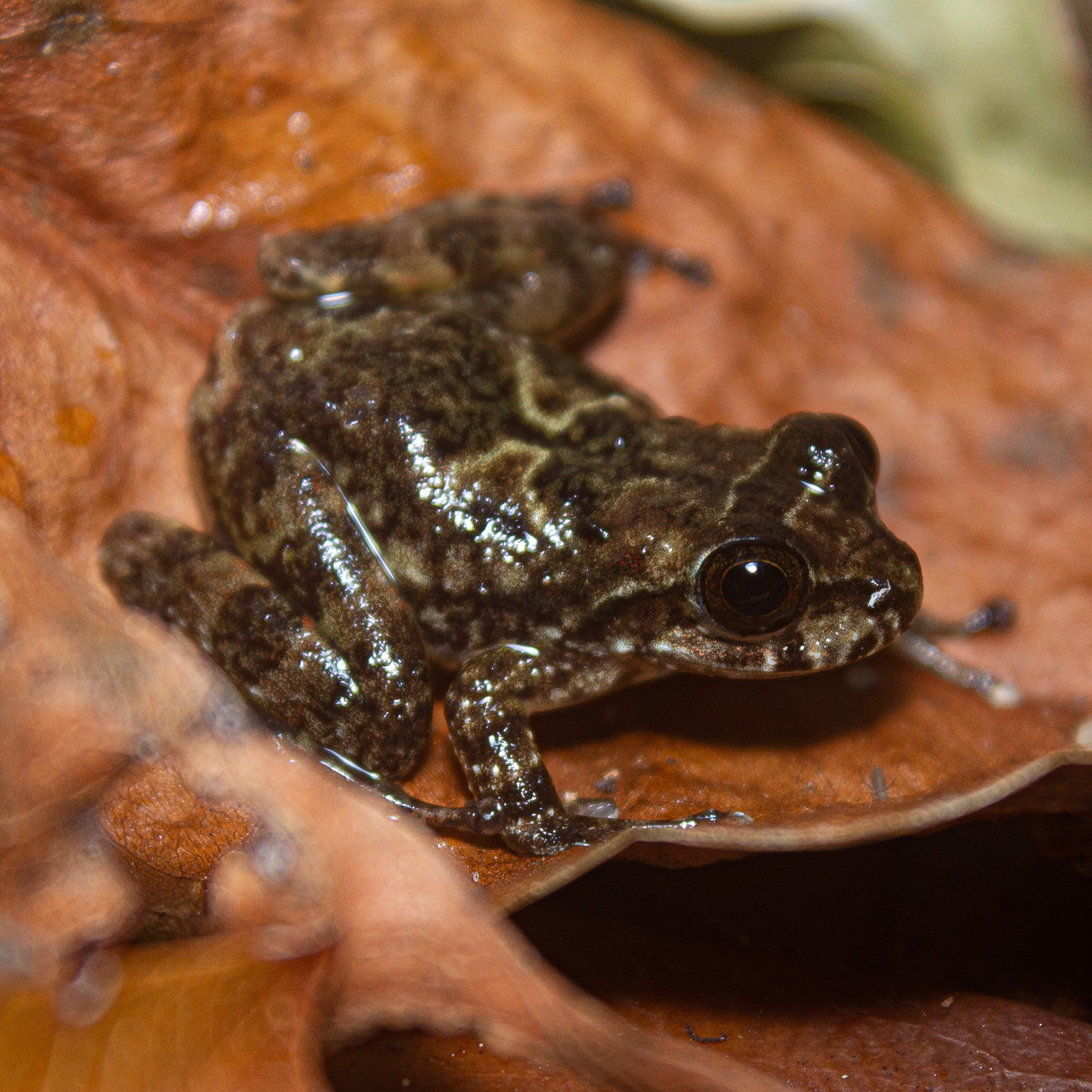

Conservation status
- Vulnerable (IUCN 3.1)

Scientific classification
- Kingdom: Animalia
- Phylum: Chordata
- Class: Amphibia
- Order: Anura
- Family: Hemiphractidae
- Genus: Cryptobatrachus
- Species: C. boulengeri

Binomial name
- Cryptobatrachus boulengeri Ruthven, 1916

Synonyms
- Hyloscirtus boulengeri — Noble, 1917

= Cryptobatrachus boulengeri =

Species of amphibian

Cryptobatrachus boulengeri, also known as Boulenger's backpack frog, is a species of frogs in the family Hemiphractidae. It is endemic to Sierra Nevada de Santa Marta in northern Colombia. The specific name honours George Albert Boulenger, an eminent herpetologist.

== Description ==
Adult males measure 34–49 mm (1.3–1.9 in) and adult females 51–72 mm (2.0–2.8 in) in snout–vent length. The snout is relatively long. The tympanum is larger in males than in females. The dorsolateral folds are thin. Skin on the dorsum is finely granular with scattered larger warts. The fingers have no webbing. The finger and toe tips bear expanded disks. Subarticular adhesive pads are present.

Female frogs carry the eggs on their back. The eggs have direct development, hatching as froglets (i.e., there is no free-living larval stage).

== Habitat and conservation ==
Cryptobatrachus boulengeri are found on rocks within fast-flowing streams in primary and secondary montane forests at elevations of 250–1,790 m (820–5,870 ft) above sea level. This species is abundant throughout its range, but it is threatened by habitat loss caused by agriculture (particularly coffee plantations), logging, and infrastructure development. Deforestation around streams is a particular threat. Additional potential threats are chytridiomycosis and pollution from agrochemicals. However, its range includes a number of protected areas, including the Sierra Nevada de Santa Marta, Las Aves El Dorado Reserve, Jirocasaca Forest Reserve, and Tayrona National Natural Parks.
