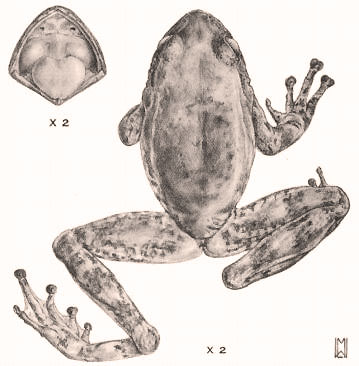
- Cryptobatrachus boulengeri

Scientific classification
- Kingdom: Animalia
- Phylum: Chordata
- Class: Amphibia
- Order: Anura
- Family: Hemiphractidae
- Genus: Cryptobatrachus; Ruthven, 1916

Type species
- Cryptobatrachus boulengeri Ruthven, 1916

Species
- 5 species (see text)

= Cryptobatrachus =

Genus of amphibians

Cryptobatrachus is a genus of frogs in the family Hemiphractidae. They are found in Colombia and Venezuela. They are also known as backpack frogs, as the females have the habit of carrying their egg clutch on their backs until the young hatch; this behavior also occurs in the related hemiphractid genera Hemiphractus and Stefania.

== Description ==
Cryptobatrachus have a treefrog-like habitus. Males measure 27–52 mm (1.1–2.0 in) and females 48–75 mm (1.9–3.0 in) in snout–vent length. Fingers have no webbing whereas the toes are webbed. The finger and toe tips bear disks that are larger on the former. Also adhesive pads are present on the penultimate subarticular tubercles on the fingers. Males lack vocal sac and these frogs appear not to vocalize.

== Species ==
There are five species in the genus Cryptobatrachus:

- Cryptobatrachus boulengeri Ruthven, 1916
- Cryptobatrachus conditus Lynch, 2008
- Cryptobatrachus fuhrmanni (Peracca, 1914)
- Cryptobatrachus pedroruizi Lynch, 2008
- Cryptobatrachus ruthveni Lynch, 2008

The AmphibiaWeb lists the five species above, but also Cryptobatrachus nicefori, which the Amphibian Species of the World places in the hylid subfamily Cophomantinae as "Hyla" nicefori, indicating uncertain generic affiliation.

== Habitat and ecology ==
Cryptobatrachus occur on humid forested slopes in the mountain ranges of northern Colombia and northeast Venezuela at elevations of 360–2,400 m (1,180–7,870 ft) above sea level. They are nocturnal and perch on low bushes or cling to rocks and cliffs in spray zones of waterfalls.
