= Stefania scalae =

Conservation status
- Least Concern (IUCN 3.1)

Scientific classification
- Kingdom: Animalia
- Phylum: Chordata
- Class: Amphibia
- Order: Anura
- Family: Hemiphractidae
- Genus: Stefania
- Species: S. scalae

Binomial name
- Stefania scalae Rivero, 1970

Species of frog

Stefania scalae is a species of frog in the family Hemiphractidae. It is found in Venezuela and possibly Guayana and Brazil.

== Habitat ==
This nocturnal frog is found on vegetation near rocky permanent streams. During the day, people see adults and juveniles hiding under rocks or near streams. Scientists have seen the frog between 130 and 1,500 m (430 and 4,920 ft) above sea level.

Scientists know the frog from a protected place, Canaima National Park.

== Reproduction ==
The female frogs carry their eggs on their backs. These eggs hatch into small froglets. This species has no free-swimming tadpole stage.

== Threats ==
The IUCN classifies this species as least concern and the Venezuelan Fauna Red List classifies it as near threatened. Climate change poses a threat because of the species' small range. Fires and viral, bacterial, and fungal pathogens could also hurt this frog.
