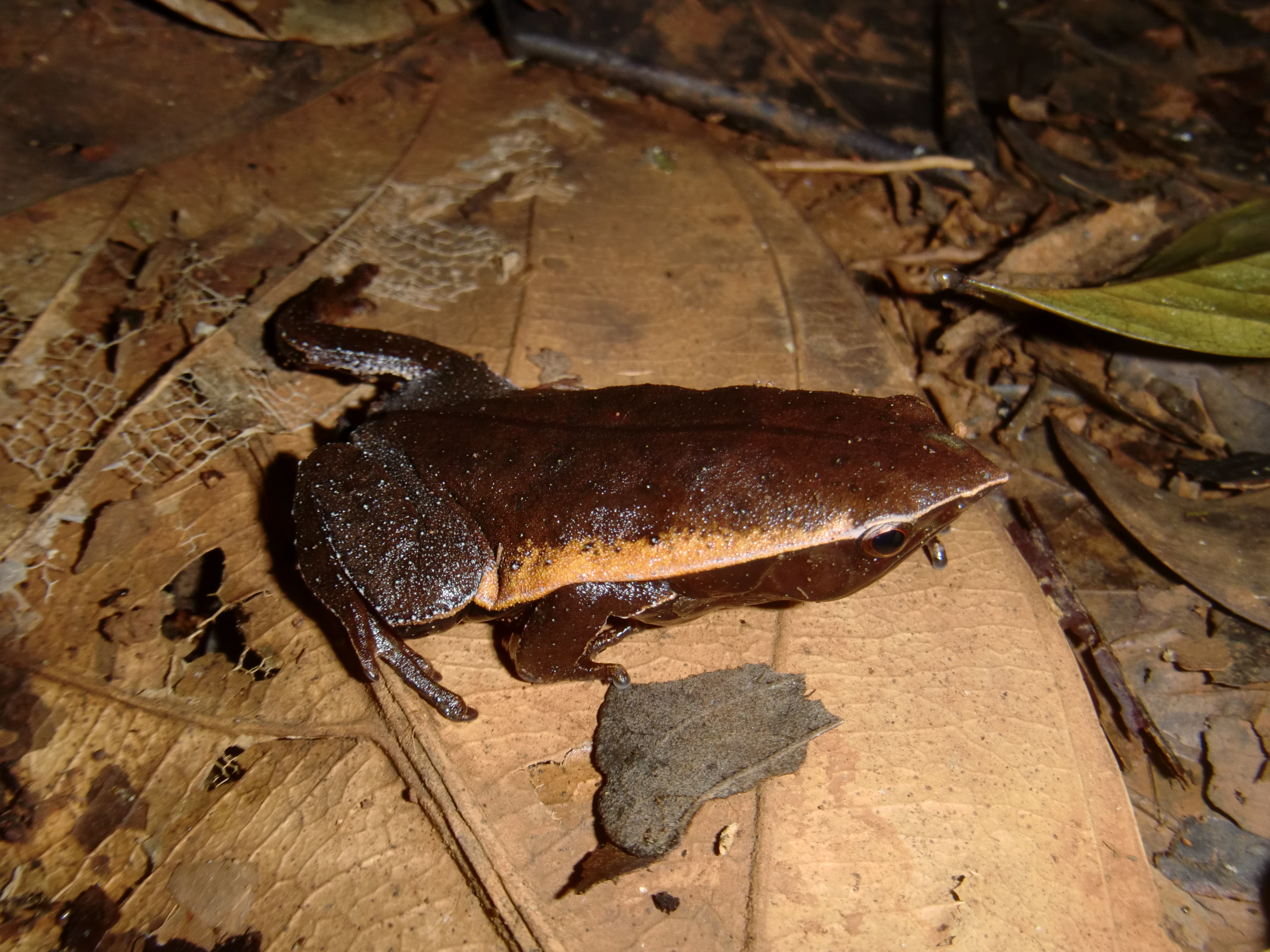
- Male O. pyburni found in French Guiana

Conservation status
- Least Concern (IUCN 3.1)

Scientific classification
- Kingdom: Animalia
- Phylum: Chordata
- Class: Amphibia
- Order: Anura
- Family: Microhylidae
- Genus: Otophryne
- Species: O. pyburni

Binomial name
- Otophryne pyburni Campbell & Clarke, 1998

= Otophryne pyburni =

Species of frog

Otophryne pyburni is a species of frog in the family Microhylidae. It is found in northern South America east of the Andes (northern Brazil, southeastern Colombia, French Guiana, Guyana, Suriname, and southern Venezuela). It is a common, diurnal frog found in tropical rainforest, perching next to streams or living on the forest floor under leaves or among roots. Males are territorial and calling mostly on rainy days. The eggs may be laid either inside or outside water. The tadpoles are aquatic and hide under leaves in small ponds. It is locally threatened by habitat loss.
