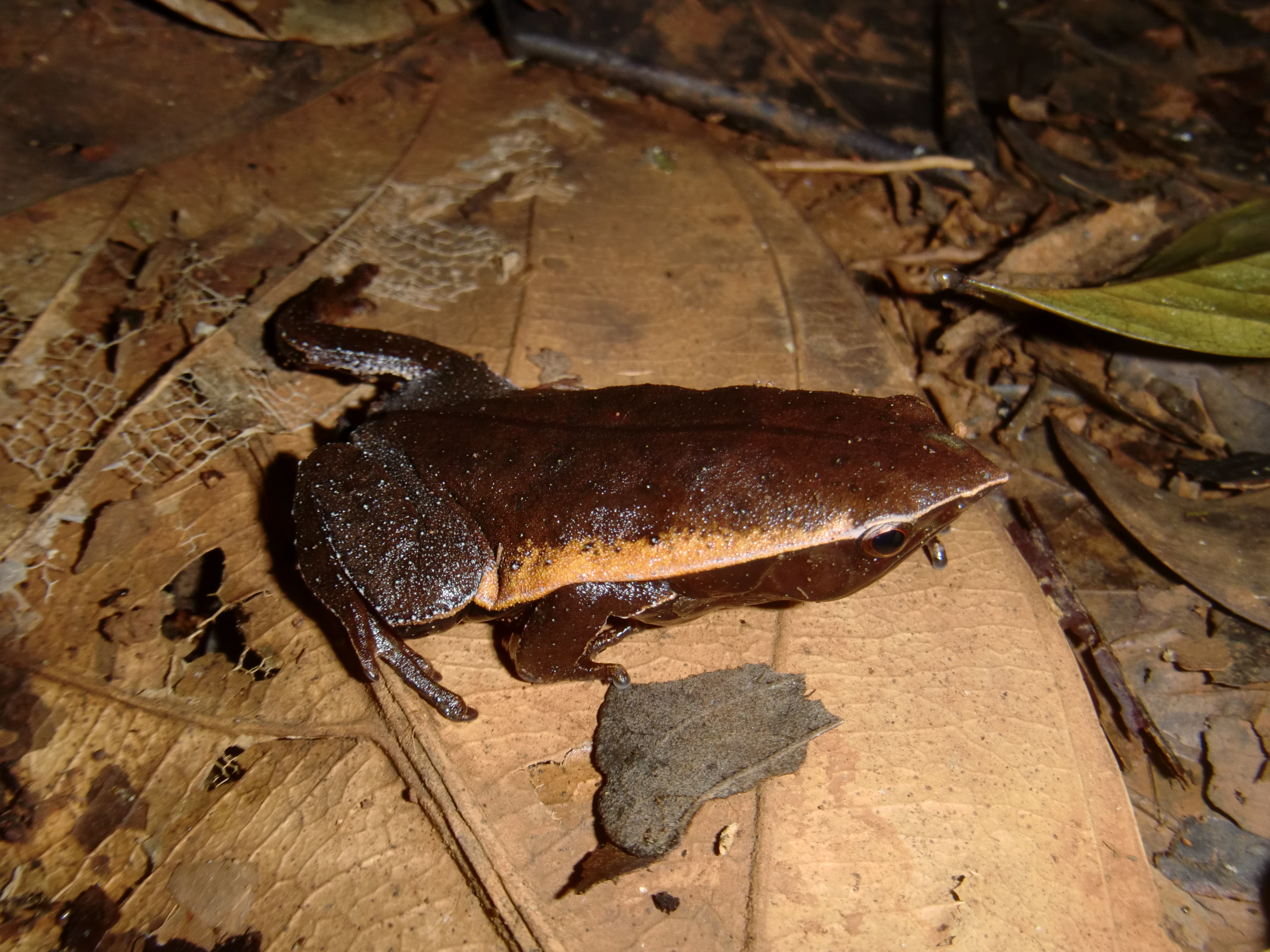
- Otophryne pyburni

Scientific classification
- Domain: Eukaryota
- Kingdom: Animalia
- Phylum: Chordata
- Class: Amphibia
- Order: Anura
- Family: Microhylidae
- Subfamily: Otophryninae
- Genus: Otophryne; Boulenger, 1900

Diversity
- 3 species (see text)

= Otophryne =

Genus of amphibians

Otophryne is a small genus of microhylid frogs from northern South America. They are sometimes known as the pancake frogs.

== Description ==
Adult Otophryne are diurnally active leaf mimics. They tend to walk rather than jump. Tadpoles burrow into the sandy bottom of shallow streams. They are extremely specialized with minute, dagger-like, keratinized teeth, and a long spiracular tube on the left hand side of its body. It is suggested that the tadpole is a suspension feeder, using the spiracular tube extending to the bottom surface to create a current through its oral cavity, using its teeth to prevent sand from entering its mouth.

== Species ==
Genus Otophryne has three species:

Binomial name and author	Common name
Otophryne pyburni Campbell & Clarke, 1998	Pyburn's pancake frog
Otophryne robusta Boulenger, 1900	Pancake frog
Otophryne steyermarki Rivero, 1968	Steyermark's robust toad
