= Otophryne robusta =

Conservation status
- Least Concern (IUCN 3.1)

Scientific classification
- Kingdom: Animalia
- Phylum: Chordata
- Class: Amphibia
- Order: Anura
- Family: Microhylidae
- Genus: Otophryne
- Species: O. robusta

Binomial name
- Otophryne robusta Boulenger, 1900

Species of frog

Otophryne robusta is a species of frog in the family Microhylidae. It is found in Guyana, Venezuela, and possibly Brazil. Its natural habitats are tropical moist montane forests and rivers. It is threatened by habitat loss.

It has been found in western Guyana and south-eastern Venezuela at elevations of 600–1200 metres It can be distinguished from the similar-appearing O. pyburni by its longer toes and mottled thighs. The tadpoles exhibit the unusual behaviour of burrowing into the sand bottoms of shallow streams.
