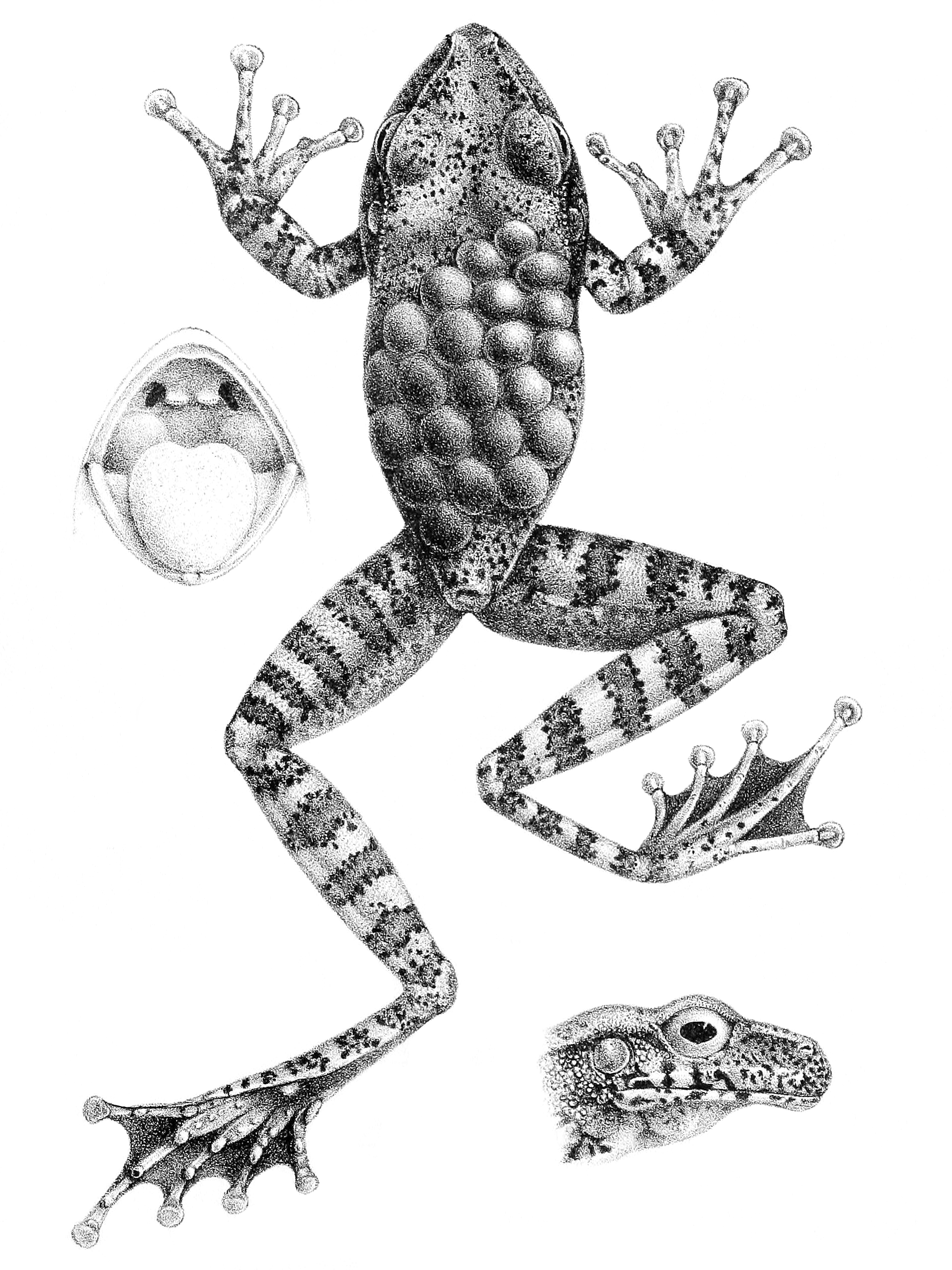

Conservation status
- Data Deficient (IUCN 3.1)

Scientific classification
- Kingdom: Animalia
- Phylum: Chordata
- Class: Amphibia
- Order: Anura
- Family: Hemiphractidae
- Genus: Stefania
- Species: S. evansi

Binomial name
- Stefania evansi (Boulenger, 1904)

Synonyms
- Hyla evansi Boulenger, 1904; Cryptobatrachus evansi (Boulenger, 1904)

= Stefania evansi =

Species of frog

Stefania evansi is a species of frog in the family Hemiphractidae. Stefania evansi is, along with other closely related frogs, known for its unusual reproductive mode where females carry the eggs and juveniles on their back. It is sometimes known under common names Groete Creek carrying frog, Groete Creek treefrog, or Evans' stefania (the "treefrog" designation can be misleading as Stefania are no longer included in the family Hylidae). These names refer to its type locality, Groete Creek in the region Essequibo Islands-West Demerara, Guyana, where the holotype was collected by one Dr. R. Evans.

== Distribution and habitat ==
Stefania evansi is endemic to Guyana and distributed in forested lowlands of west-central Guyana at altitudes below 900 m (3,000 ft). Frogs collected at higher altitudes probably represent Stefania scalae, a species that was for a while considered to be synonymous with Stefania evansi. It generally occurs in habitats with low human impact and is not considered threatened.

== Description ==
Stefania evansi is one of the largest members of the genus: males grow to up to 53 mm (2.1 in) in snout–vent length and females to 98 mm (3.9 in). Stefania evansi is dimorphic with respect to colouration: one morph is plain, and the other one is striped. A single brood can contain both morphs.

== Reproduction ==
As is typical for the genus, female Stefania evansi carry the eggs on their back and juveniles develop fully on their mother's back. The eggs and juveniles are exposed but adhere to a mucus layer. Brood size is variable: among 11 recorded clutches, it is 11–30 eggs and increases with female size; 30 eggs is the highest brood size recorded in the genus. Eggs containing tailed, gilled larvae measure 8–9 mm (0.31–0.35 in) in diameter. Eggs hatch on the female's back as froglets, without a free-living larval stage. Juveniles stay on their mother's back until they are about 19 mm (0.75 in) in length, although smaller (17–18 mm (0.67–0.71 in) SVL) independent juveniles can also be found. It is speculated that the juveniles leave their mother's back when the resorption of the gill stalks is complete, coinciding with the consumption of all yolk. Juveniles may leave their mother also prematurely, showing residual gill stalks and yolk in their bellies, in response to stress caused by handling or predation.

The duration of development and brooding is not known, but is assumed to require about 2–3 months. Breeding seems more frequent during—but not strictly restricted to—the rainy season.
