= Mount Roraima =

Mountain in Brazil, Guyana and Venezuela

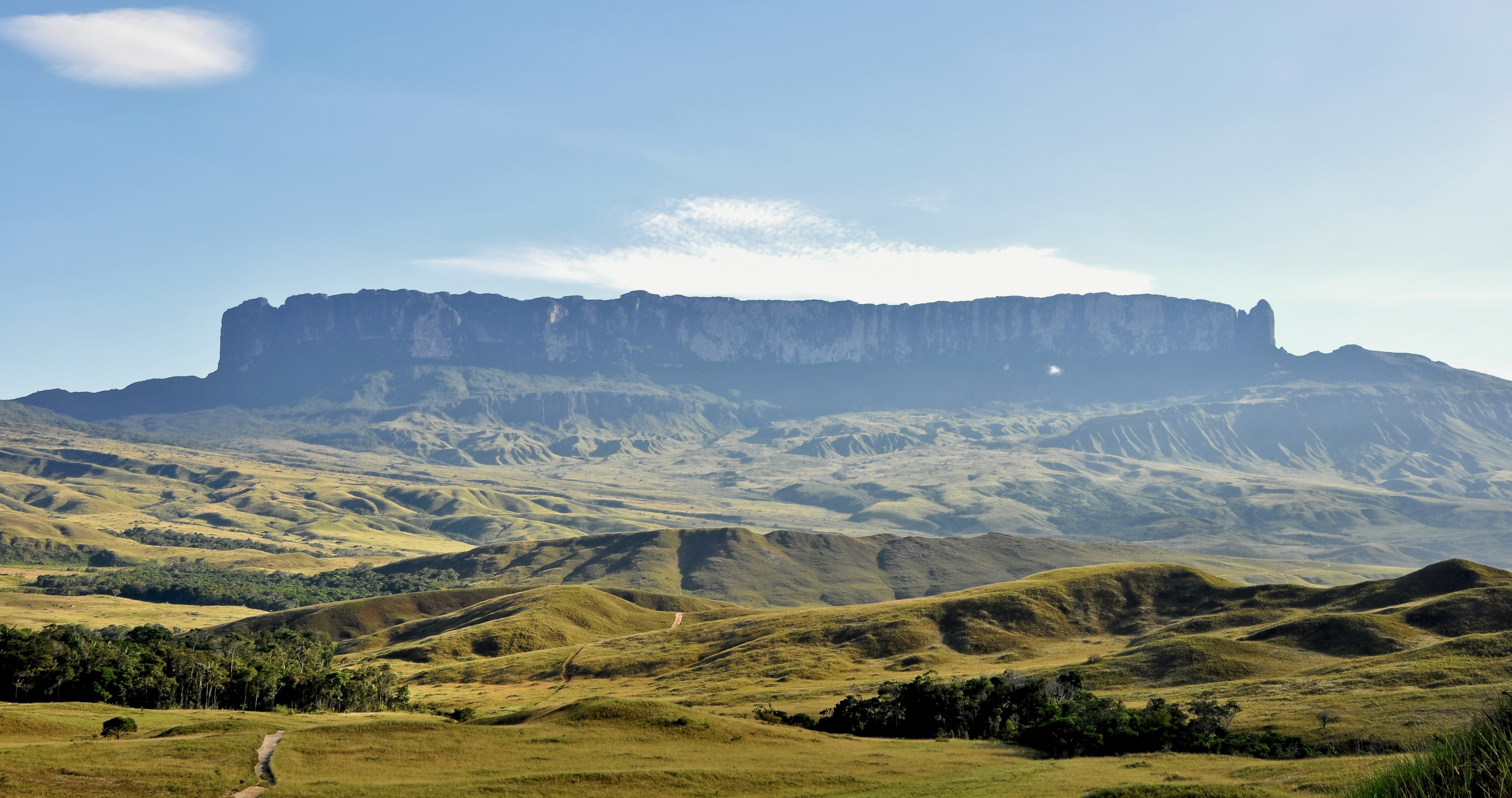
- Mount Roraima as seen from the Venezuelan side

Highest point
- Elevation: 2,810 m (9,220 ft)
- Prominence: 2,338 m (7,671 ft)
- Listing: Country high point; Ultra prominent peak
- Coordinates: 5°08′36″N 60°45′45″W

Geography
- Location within South America Location within Brazil Location within Guyana Location within Venezuela
- Location: Border region between Brazil (Roraima), Guyana (Cuyuni-Mazaruni) and Venezuela (Bolívar)
- Countries: Brazil; Guyana; Venezuela
- Parent range: Pacaraima Mountains, Guayana Highlands

Geology
- Mountain type: Plateau

Climbing
- First ascent: 1884, led by Sir Everard im Thurn and accompanied by Harry Inniss Perkins and several natives (Note: For all around wore rocks and pinnacles of rocks of seemingly impossibly fantastic forms, standing in apparently impossibly fantastic ways — nay, placed one on or next to the other in positions seeming to defy every law of gravity — rocks in groups, rocks standing singly, rocks in terraces, rocks as columns, rocks as walls and rocks as pyramids, rocks ridiculous at every point with countless apparent caricatures of the faces and forms of men and animals, apparent caricatures of umbrellas, tortoises, churches, cannons, and of innumerable other most incongruous and unexpected objects.) (Note: Lord Aberdare said that Mr. Perkins, who accompanied Mr. im Thurn in the ascent of the mountain, had fared little better, inasmuch as he also had been severely attacked by fever since his return, and though present that evening, was still too weak to read his notes.)
- Easiest route: Hiking path

Mount Roraima (Spanish: Monte Roraima; Tepuy Roraima; Cerro Roraima; Portuguese: Monte Roraima) is the highest of the Pacaraima chain of tepuis (table-top mountain) or plateaux in South America. (Note: "Mount Roraima is the point where the boundaries of Venezuela, Brazil and British Guiana actually meet, and a stone stands on its summit, placed there by the International Commission in 1931." — Michael Swan (1957)) It is located at the junction of Brazil, Guyana and Venezuela. A characteristic, large, flat-topped mountain surrounded by cliffs 400–1,000 m (1,300–3,300 ft) high, its highest point is located on the southern edge of the cliff at an elevation of 2,810 m (9,220 ft) in Venezuela. (Note: Maverick Rock, a rock formation on the plateau.) Another protrusion at an elevation of 2,772 m (9,094 ft) at the junction of the three countries in the north of the plateau is the highest point in Guyana. The name Mount Roraima came from the native Pemon people. Roroi in the Pemon language means "blue-green", and ma means "great".

Leaching caused by intense rainfall has shaped the peculiar topography of the summit, and the geographical isolation of Mount Roraima has made it home to much endemic flora and fauna. Western exploration of Mount Roraima did not begin until the 19th century, when it was first climbed by a British expedition in 1884. Yet despite subsequent expeditions, its flora and geology remain largely unknown. The privileged setting and relatively easy access and climbing conditions on the south side of the cliffs make Mount Roraima a popular destination for hikers.

== Geography ==
Mount Roraima is located in the Pacaraima Mountains in the eastern part of the Guiana Highlands, in northern South America. Its area is shared among three countries: Brazil to the east (5%), Guyana to the north (10%), and Venezuela to the south and west (85%). Access to Mount Roraima from the Venezuelan side is close to the road and relatively easy; however, for both Brazil and Guyana the area is completely isolated and can be reached only by a few days of forest hikes or small local airstrip.

Mount Roraima is a flat-topped mountain, typical of the Guyana Shield, with an elevation of about 1,200 m (3,900 ft) in the southeast and only about 600 m (2,000 ft) in the northwest. The south, southeast, east, northeast and northwest faces are all formed by straight cliffs up to about 1,000 m (3,300 ft) high. At the southern end of the mountain, part of the cliff has collapsed, forming a natural boulder. The base of the cliff is surrounded by steep slopes to the south and east, and the north and west sides form river valleys leading to the summit.

The top of Mount Roraima has a length of more than 10 km (6.2 mi), a maximum width of 5 km (3.1 mi), an area of about 33–50 km^{2} (13–19 sq mi), an elevation of more than 2,200 m (7,200 ft), and an average elevation of 2,600–2,700 m (8,500–8,900 ft). The plateau is a pseudo-karst surface etched by heavy rainfall. The highest point is 2,810 m (9,219 ft) above sea level, located at the southern end of the plateau and the highest point in the state of Bolívar, 8.25 km (5.13 mi) north of the summit is another high point with an elevation of 2,772 m (9,100 ft), which is the highest point in Guyana. In the northern part of the plateau is the landmark of the border between Brazil, Venezuela and Guyana, with an elevation of 2,734 m (8,970 ft).

Due to its height and proximity to the equator, Mount Roraima has a constant average annual temperature between 20–22 °C (68–72 °F) and annual rainfall of more than 1,500 mm (59 in), with 1,800–3,000 mm (71–120 in) in parts of the rainy season from April to November. The climatic conditions at the top of the mountain differ significantly from its base, the high cloudiness in the region is associated with the prevailing northeasterly and southeasterly winds, and the relative humidity of the air remains between 75% and 85%.

== Geology ==
Mount Roraima is composed of Proterozoic age sandstone formed about 1.7 to 2 billion years ago, and hence is amongst the oldest rocks on Earth. It contains a large amount of quartz deposits, 98% are silica particles, forming white or pink crystals several centimeters long. These rocks sit on a granite and gneiss base and were originally covered by layers of Mesozoic clay, conglomerate, and diorite, but have been exposed by erosion and by orogeny over the past 180 million years, eroded by precipitation to form strange shapes. The soil of the sandstone matrix is highly acidic, poor in nutrients, and very fine. Intense rainfall prevents the fixation of nutrients and particles, thereby preventing the formation of hilltop vegetation and soil.

The numerous caves and rifts in the interior of the plateau make Mount Roraima exhibit a pseudo-karst structure, and these caves form a network over 15 km (9.3 mi) long, with a total height difference of 73.21 m (240.2 ft). It contains the largest quartz cave in the world, discovered by the Oxford University Cave Club and the Venezuelan Speleological Society. These caves are formed by the infiltration of surface water, so the water level inside them depends largely on the precipitation on the surface of the plateau: prolonged drought can dry up waterways, and dry caves can also become underground rivers. Water pours into the caves, rushes through crevices in the rock, and flows out as waterfalls on the mountainside, feeding numerous streams at the foot of the mountain.

== Ecology ==
Due to the late exploration of this part of South America and the discovery of new species every year, the flora and fauna here are largely unknown. The currently identified species are strongly endemic, especially the fauna, which also puts them at a high risk of extinction. The bottom of the cliff at the foot of the mountain is an evergreen rainforest composed of trees 25–45 m (82–150 ft) high, and some can reach 60 m (200 ft). Vegetation is dominated by Arecaceae and Astragalus. The soils on the cliffs are sandier, the climate is cooler, and the vegetation consists of bromeliads very similar to the Andes. The vegetation on the plateau is still largely unknown and consists mainly of bare rocks, forests of trees and epiphytes, and wet and dry savannas in the form of swamps. It is marked by numerous endemic species, especially carnivorous plants that capture insects, living in sandstone and leaching soils which lack the nitrates necessary for their development. There are fewer species in the vicinity of streams and ravines, and the trees are 8–15 m (26–49 ft) tall and have hard leaves that can adapt to harsh environmental conditions. The exposed rocks are occupied by lichens, algae and cyanobacteria.

Endemic flora include plants like Orectanthe sceptrum, Sauvagesia imthurnii, Celiantha imthurniana, Roraima marsh pitchers (Heliamphora nutans), Gran Sabana sundew (Drosera felix), Roraima bladderworts (Utricularia quelchii), Roraima "azaleas" (Bejaria imthurnii) and many more.

The fauna at the foot of the mountain are composed of a variety of mammals, and this huge diversity is particularly prominent in the Amazon rainforest, such as sloths, anteaters, tapirs, armadillos, capybaras, opossums, agouti, weasels, raccoons, deer, cougars, and primates such as howler monkeys and capuchins. There are hundreds of species of birds, the most common of which include falcons, parrots, and owls. Some hummingbirds are endemic to the region. Due to low mobility relative to other species, reptiles and amphibians show large differences between individuals found at the bottom and top of Mount Roraima. While species inhabiting forests at the foot of the plateau are common, such as green iguanas, pit vipers, coral snakes and pythons, those found at the top are even rarer. Cave fauna consists of many species of bats, grasshoppers, spiders and centipedes.

Endemic species include rodents, such as the Roraima climbing mouse (Rhipidomys macconnelli roraimae) or the rarer Roraima mouse (Podoxymys roraimae), as well as many birds such as the Greater flowerpiercer (Diglossa major) or the two subspecies of sparrow, Zonotrichia capensis roraimae and Zonotrichia capensis macconelli. One of the most well known endemic species is the Roraima toad (Oreophrynella quelchii).

== Exploration ==
European discovery was in 1595, during a Spanish and British race to colonize this part of South America. The English poet, army officer and explorer Walter Raleigh described it as an immeasurable "crystal mountain" gushing countless waterfalls. The first expedition to Mount Roraima took place in 1838, when German scientist and explorer Robert Hermann Schomburgk observed it during a Royal Geographical Society-funded expedition to explore British Guiana (1835–1839). In 1840, the British government commissioned him to establish the boundaries between British Guiana and Venezuela. When he returned to the area in 1844 to study the local flora, he reported that the peak seemed inaccessible due to its towering cliffs. In 1864, German naturalist and botanist Carl Ferdinand Appun and British geologist Charles Barrington Brown arrived at the southeastern tip of Mount Roraima for observation and proposed to go up the mountain by hot air balloon.

Although its vertical cliffs make access very difficult, Mount Roraima was the first large mesa to be climbed in the Guyana Plateau. Henry Whiteley, who studied the birds of the area, observed that the summit could be reached from the south with the help of ropes and ladders. Everard im Thurn and Harry Perkins led an expedition sponsored by the Royal Geographical Society that culminated on December 18, 1884, when the team met local people known as the Pemón who could have climbed to the top of Mount Roraima prior to their expedition. The explorers still believed the top of the cliff to be previously unknown to humans. Subsequently, teams of botanists, zoologists, and geologists mounted numerous expeditions to Mount Roraima to study its largely unknown flora and fauna and distinctive geological conditions.

== Climbing ==
Mount Roraima and Mount Aoyan are the only flat-topped mountains in the Canaima National Park that can be climbed by hikers, with a monthly quota of 200 people. Its ascent takes three to five days in total, the summit route is on a natural slope on the southwestern cliffs of Mount Roraima, it does not require any special equipment or training, so it is chosen by almost all hikers, the only difficulty is that some streams and small waterfalls may become difficult to pass under heavy rain. However, the length of the trail requires climbers to spend one night at the base camp at the foot of the cliff at an elevation of about 2,000 meters, and another night at the summit, taking several days to explore the plateau and two days to descend. The best time to climb Mount Roraima is in the dry season, however, when the sun is very strong and the temperature is high, it can make the road to the mountain difficult.

== Gallery ==
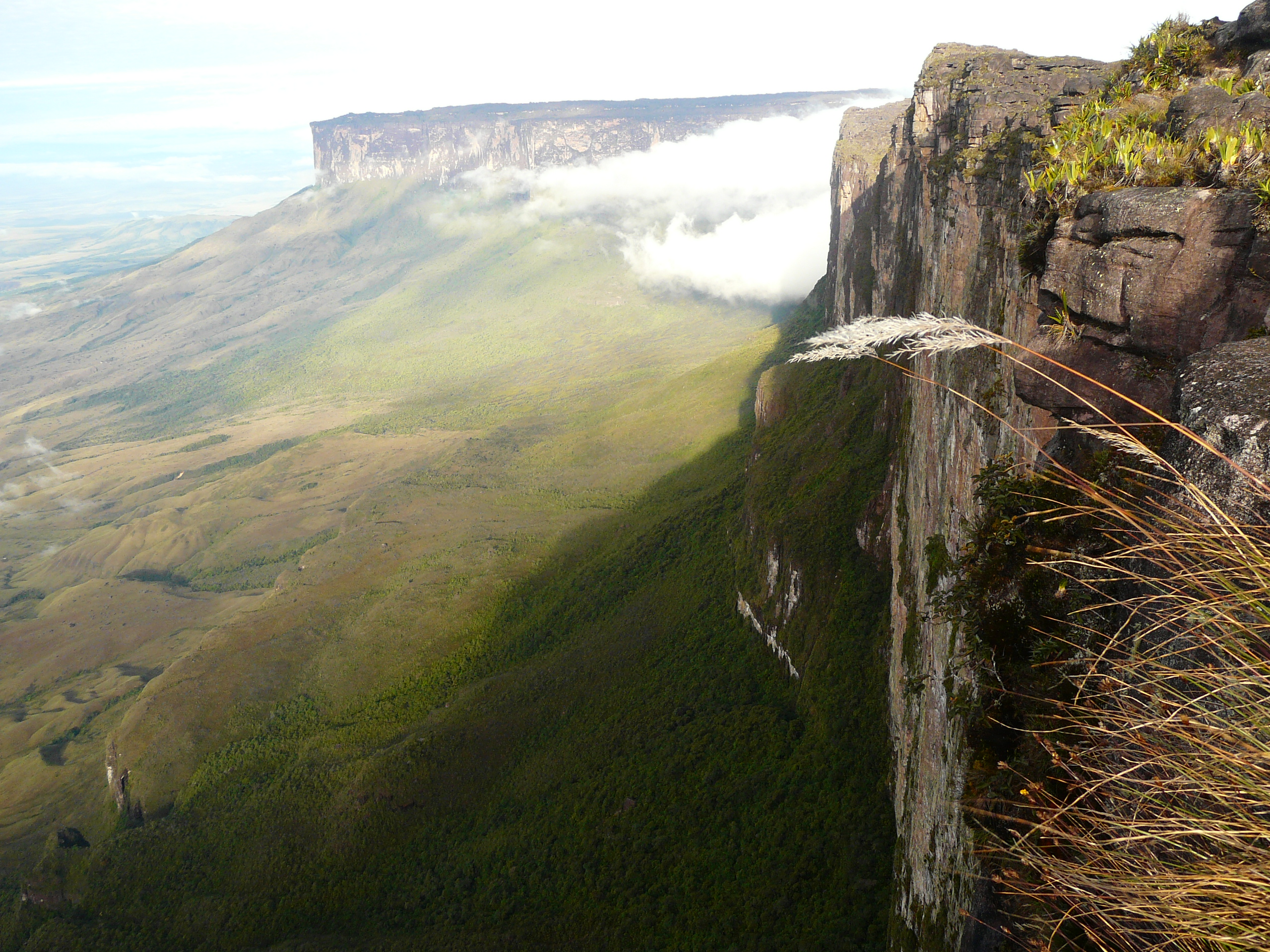
The cliffs of Mount Roraima

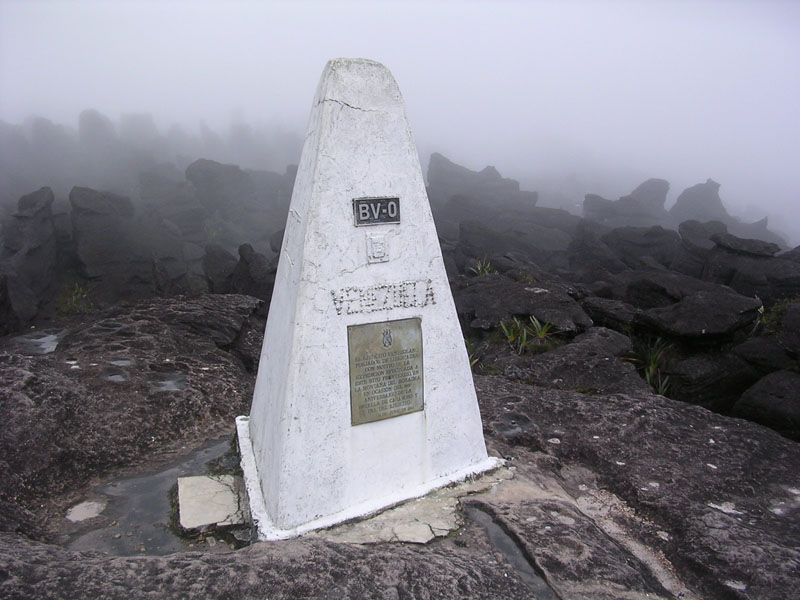
Tripoint marker where the borders of Brazil, Guyana, and Venezuela meet on top of Mount Roraima

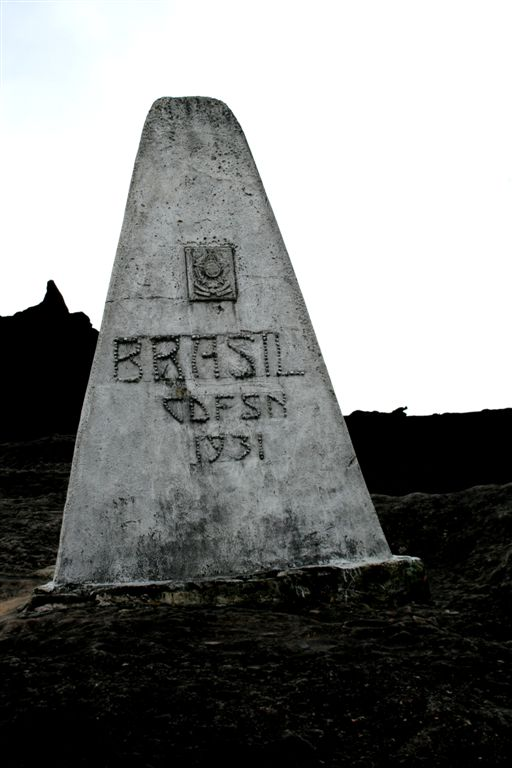
Roraima Tripoint

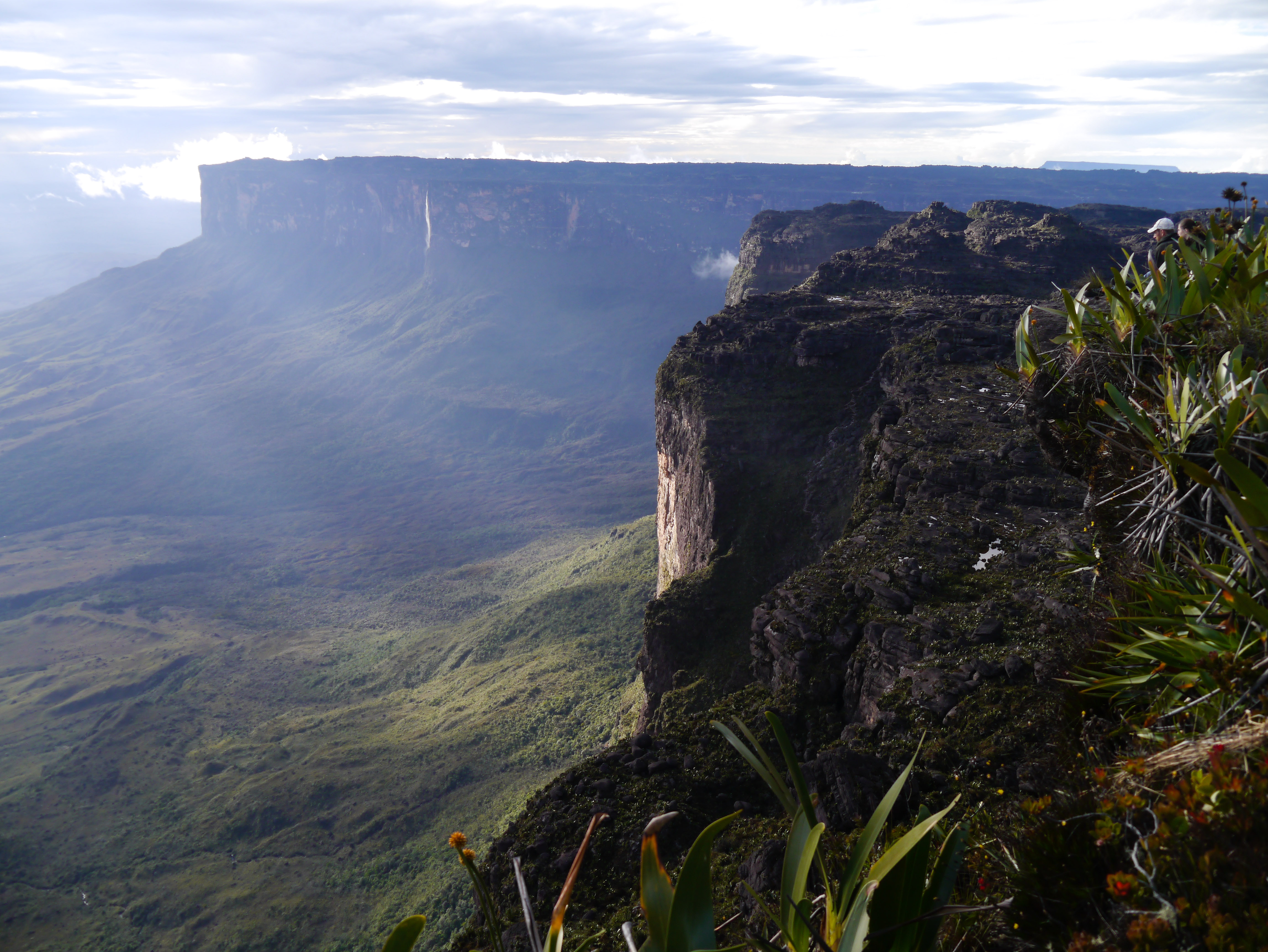
The Roraima Falls

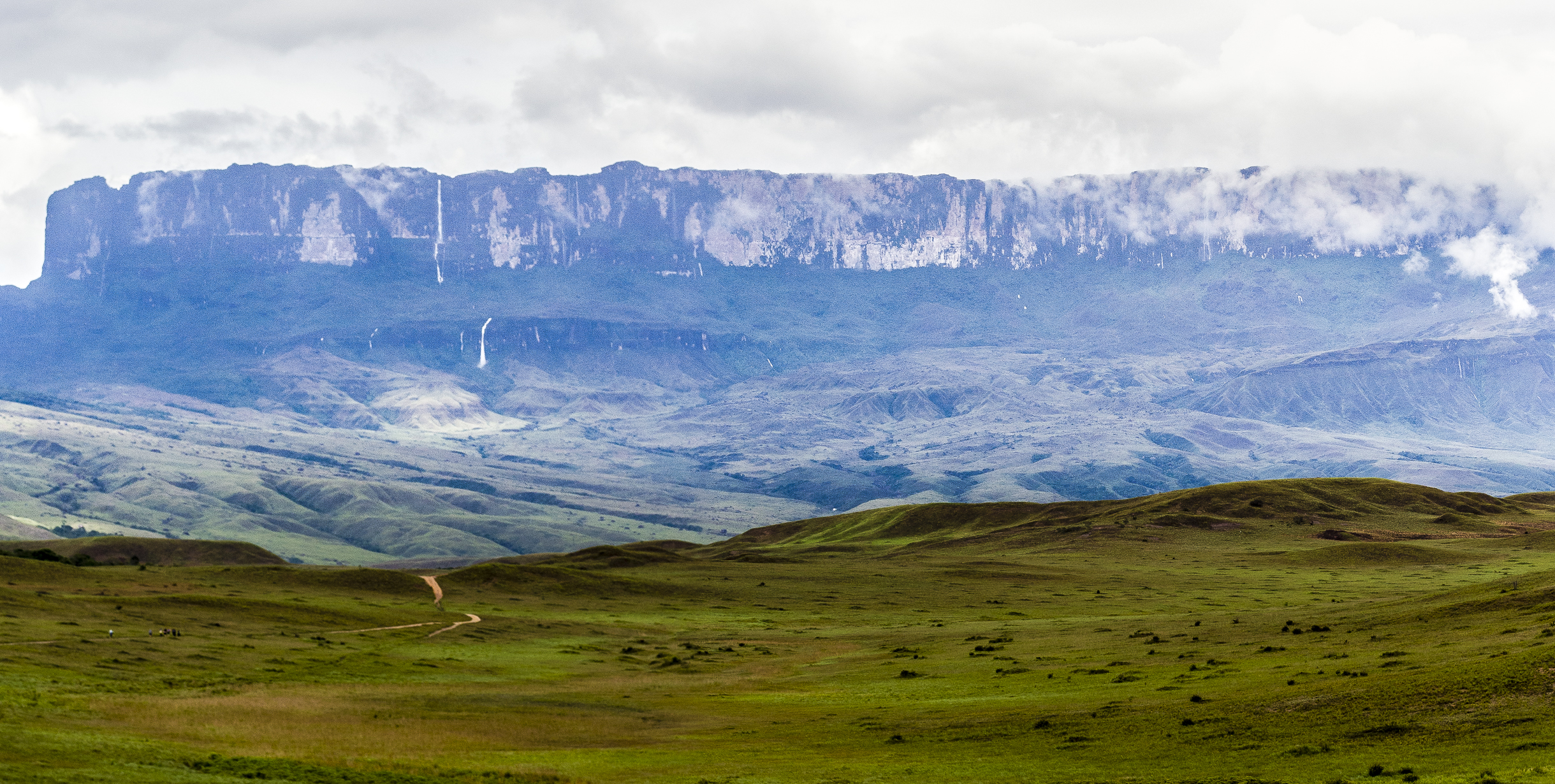
Mount Roraima and the falls as seen from the Venezuela side

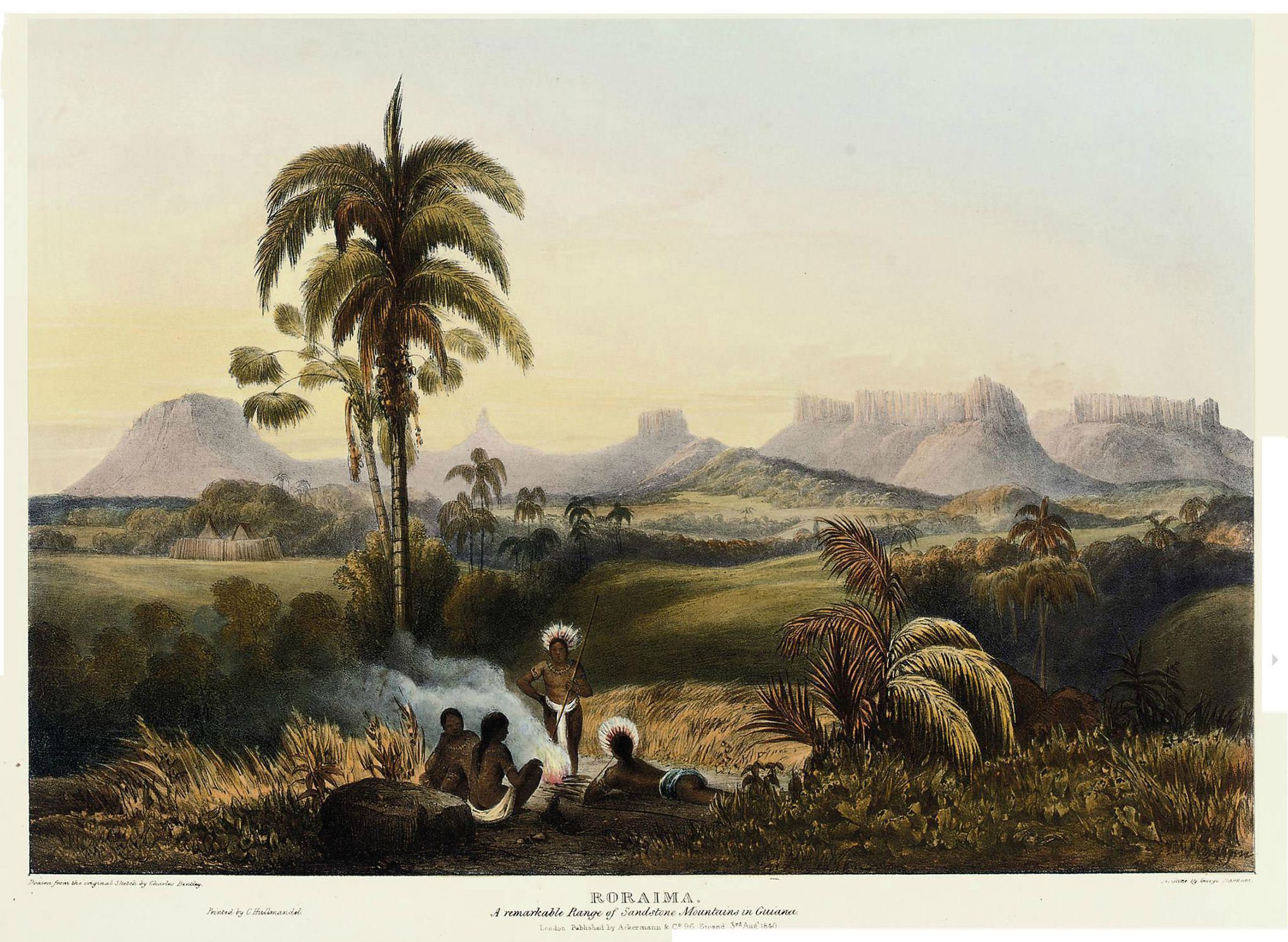
Roraima, A Remarkable Range of Sandstone Mountains in Guiana. Painters Charles Bentley and Robert H. Schomburgk, engraver George Barnard. Published by Ackermann, 1840

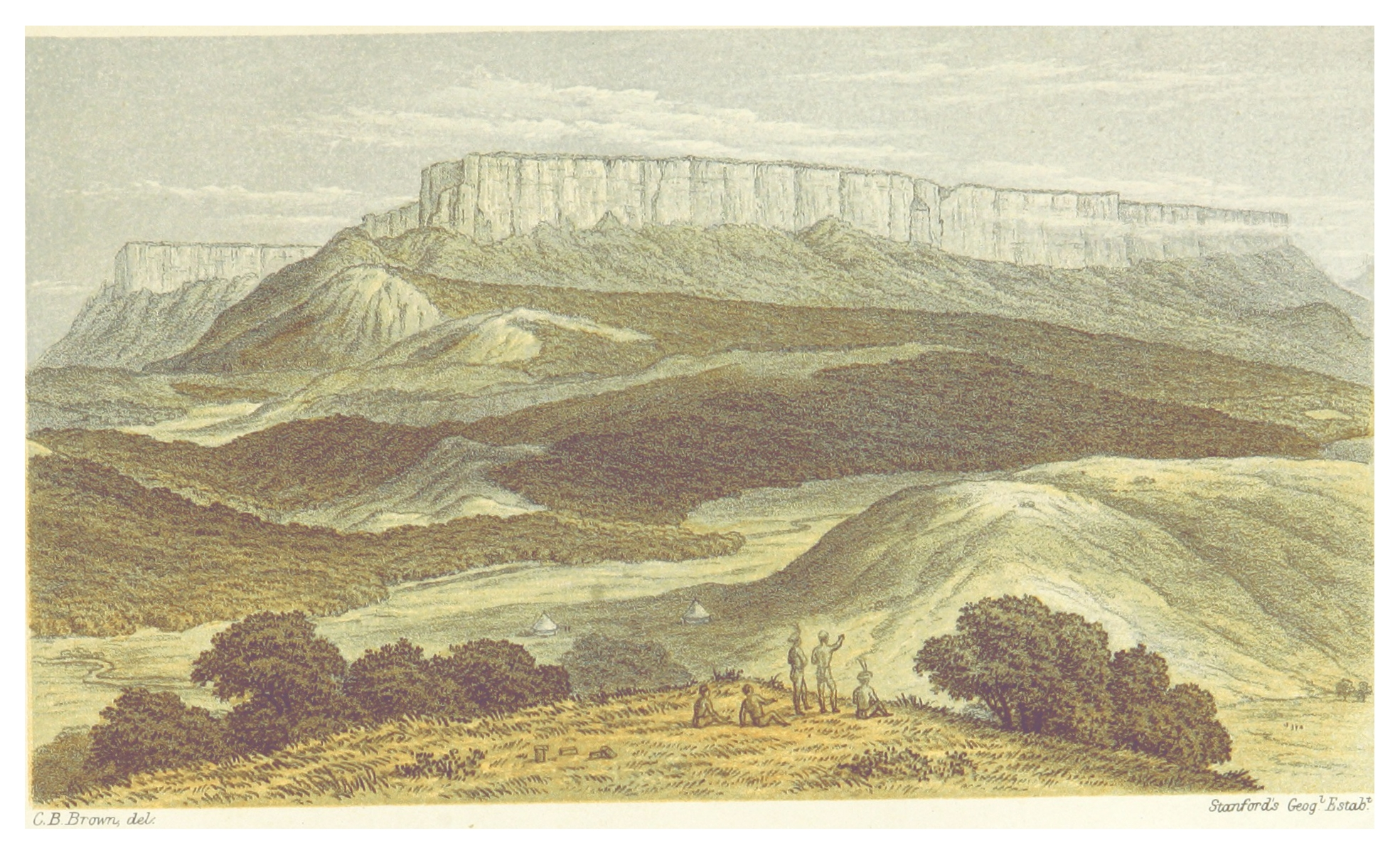
An illustration of Mount Roraima in Canoe and Camp Life in British Guiana, 1876
