= Pacaraima Mountains =

Mountain range in South America

Coordinates: 5°00′N 61°00′W

- Pakaraima Mountains
- Location within South America

Highest point
- Listing: Mount Roraima

Dimensions
- Length: 800 km (500 mi)

Geography
- Location: Brazil, Guyana, Venezuela

The Pacaraima or Pakaraima Mountains (Portuguese: Serra de Pacaraima, Spanish: Sierra de Pacaraima) are a mountain range primarily in southwestern Guyana, and into northern Brazil and eastern Venezuela.

== Geography ==
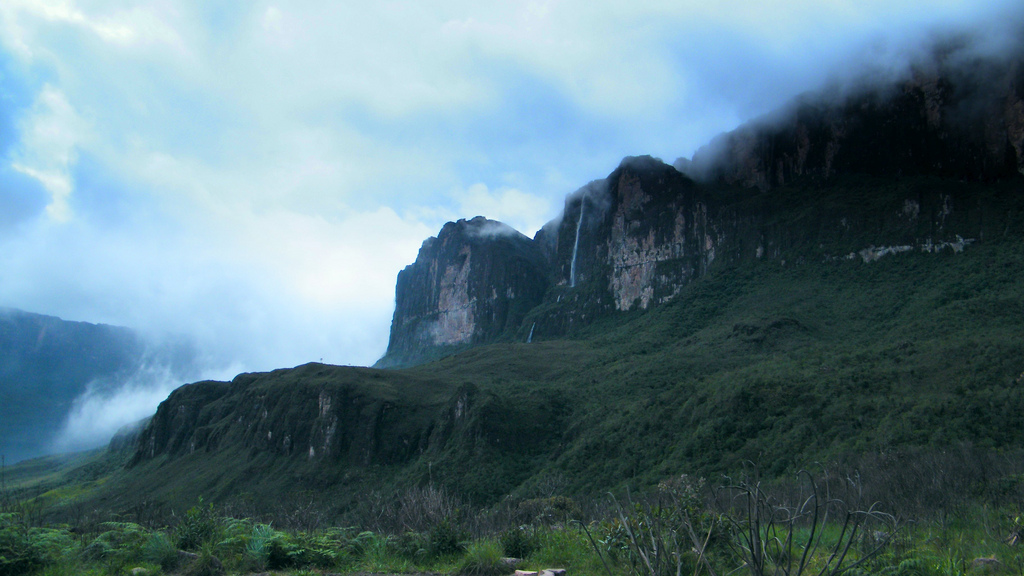
Mount Roraima, a tepui of the Pacaraima Mountains.

The range extends from west to east for over 800 kilometres (500 mi). Its highest peak is Mount Roraima at 2,810 metres (9,220 ft) above sea level, a tepui surrounded by cliffs 300 metres (980 ft) high.

It is geologically part of the Guayana Shield and biogeographically part of the Guayana Highlands.The mountains form the divide between the Orinoco Valley to the north and the Amazon Basin to the south. They also serve as a natural boundary in the east–west direction, where they extend 800 kilometres (500 mi) to form a border marker between Brazil and southeastern Venezuela and between Brazil and west central Guyana.

== Geology ==
The Pacaraimas are a sandstone plateau underlain by a horizontal precambrian marine strata that arose in post-cretaceous time. Erosion of the sandstone (the Roraima Supergroup) results in dramatic escarpments, the individual remnants of which are called tepuis. Mount Roraima, Mount Ayanganna and Mount Wokomung are some of the more well-known examples.

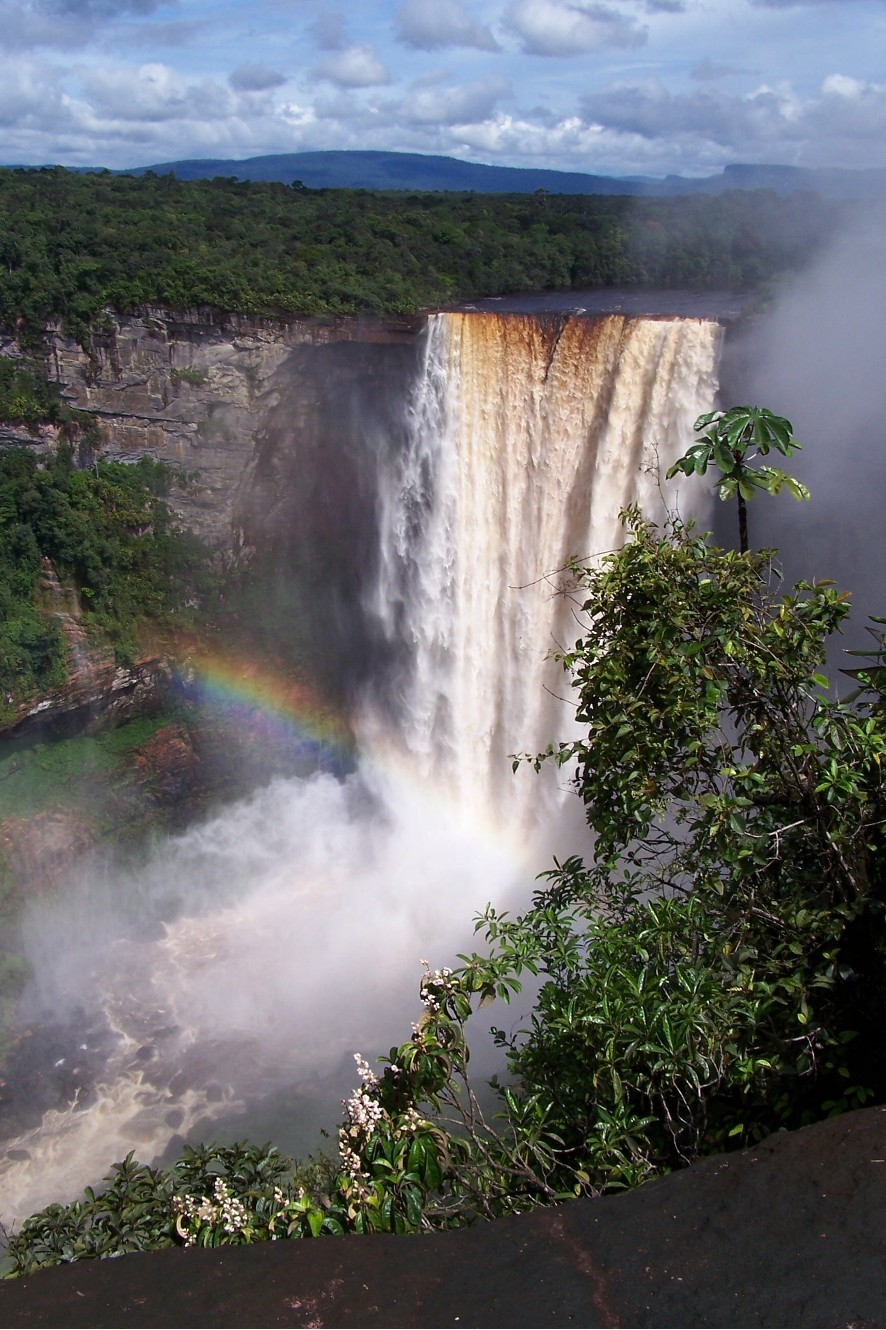
Kaieteur Falls

Numerous rivers originate in these mountains and on their way down they plunge spectacularly to form some picturesque waterfalls. A beautiful example of this is the Kaieteur Falls in Guyana. The headwaters of the Mazaruni River and Ireng River are sourced in the Pacaraimas.

== Ecology ==
The Pacaraimas are mostly forested, with occasional savannas especially at the base of Roraima and on the Brazilian side of the range. The savannas are made up of grasses and the occasional Curatella americana trees below 6500 ft. These areas are prone to fire, either man-made for agriculture or cattle ranching or during times of drought.

Difficulty in breaching the steep slopes has made data collection a challenge, however the relative isolation of these flat-topped mountains produces an array of endemic flora with a "great potential for high species diversity". The Rapateaceae family is one of the most commonly represented of flowering plants amid the tepui plateaus.

=== Conservation ===
Logging and mining interests pose a threat to the biodiversity of the Pacaraimas.

The 116,748 hectares (288,490 acres) Monte Roraima National Park protects part of the range in Roraima, Brazil.

== Settlement ==
The mountains are a traditional home to Patamona and Macushi people.

The Macushi village of Tipuru is considered the oldest village in the South Pakaraima Mountains. It has the oldest church and school in the region.

Landmarks are of special significance to indigenous people, and are intertwined with oral histories and culture. According to Macushi cosmology, mountains and other landforms were created by mythical creator brothers when they cut down Wayaka, the "tree of life". These brothers transformed people, animals, and other things into rock formations, thus giving them special mythological origins.

== See also ==
- Guayana Highlands topics
- Mountain ranges of Guyana
- Geography of Guyana
