= Mount Wokomung =

Mountain in Guyana

- Location within Guyana

Highest point
- Elevation: 1,700 m (5,600 ft)
- Coordinates: 5°05′N 59°50′W

Geography
- Country: Guyana
- Region: Potaro-Siparuni
- Parent range: Pacaraima Mountains

Mount Wokomung is a sandstone tepui in the Pakaraima Mountains of western Guyana, the summit is 1,700 metres (5,577 ft). Together with Mount Ayanganna, 37 km (23 mi) to the north, Wokomung constitutes the easternmost tepui reaching above 1500 metres.

The slopes of Mount Wokomung are covered with medium-high canopy montane forest The summit of Wokomung is a shallow bowl with poor drainage. It supports low woody shrubs and terrestrial bromeliads.

Mount Wokomung supports some species which occur only on high tepuis in the Guiana Shield region
