= Mount Ayanganna =

Sandstone tepui in Guyana

- Location within Guyana

Highest point
- Elevation: 2,040 m (6,690 ft)
- Coordinates: 5°23′N 59°56′W

Geography
- Location: Guyana
- Region: Cuyuni-Mazaruni
- Parent range: Pakaraima Mountains

Mount Ayanganna is a sandstone tepui in the Pakaraima Mountains of western Guyana, and located 85 kilometres (53 mi) east of Mount Roraima.

With a height of 2,041 metres (6,696 ft) it is the easternmost tepui taller than 2,000 metres (6,600 ft). It is part of the Guiana Shield and Guyana Highlands.

== Ecology ==
The slopes of Mount Ayanganna are covered in tall-canopy lower montane forest, up to about 1100 metres. Above this elevation, there is a series of "steps" – relatively flat plateaus separated by steeper slopes. The poorly drained plateaus support low-canopy forest or terrestrial bromeliads. The slopes support medium-canopy high-montane forest. The amphibians and reptiles of Ayanganna have been surveyed.

Mount Ayanganna is fully within Guyanese territory and is surrounded by rainforest.

== Culture ==
In 1966, the national flag was planted on Mount Ayanganna to commemorate Independence. It is undertaken yearly by members of the Guyana Defence Force. The Georgetown army base headquarters is also named after Mount Ayanganna. In 1992, the first female soldier joined the expedition.

== See also ==
- Tepuis topics
