= Tepui =

Table-top mountain or mesa in the Guiana Highlands of South America

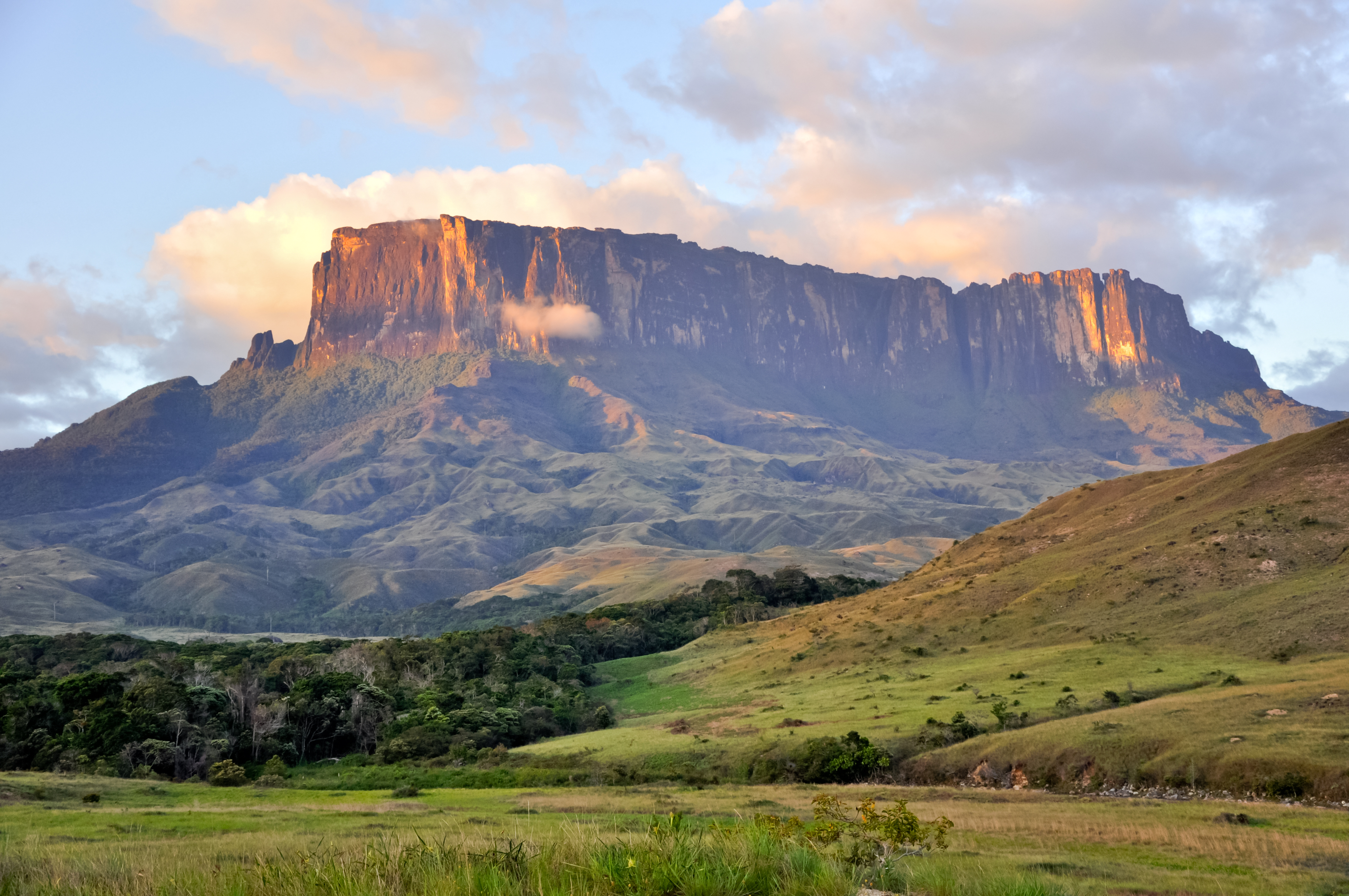
- Kukenan tepui

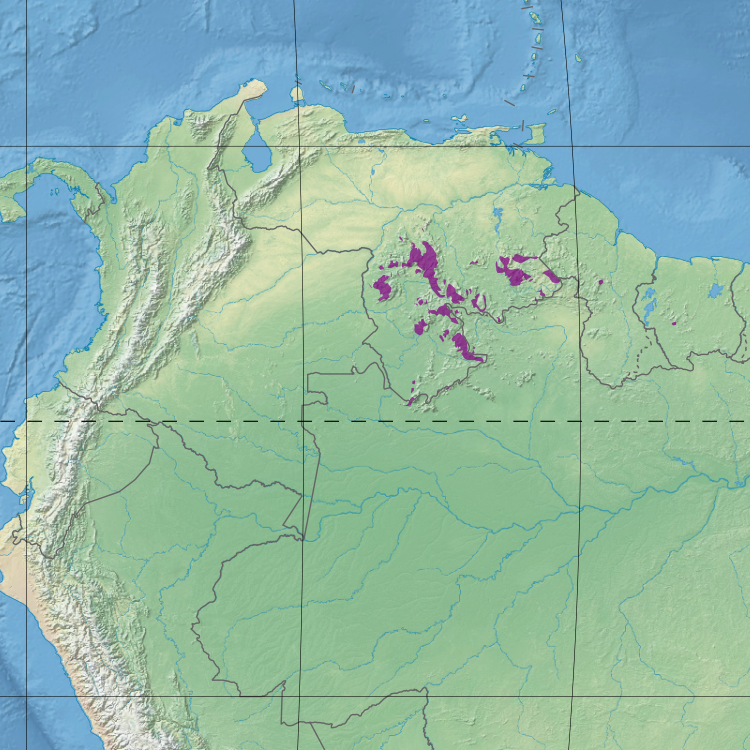
- Ecoregion territory (in purple)

Ecology
- Realm: Neotropical
- Biome: tropical and subtropical moist broadleaf forests
- Borders: Guianan Highlands moist forests; Guianan piedmont and lowland moist forests, Guianan savanna

Geography
- Area: 50,675 km^{2} (19,566 mi^{2})
- Countries: Venezuela; Brazil; Guyana; Suriname

Conservation
- Conservation status: Relatively stable/intact
- Protected: 37,658 km^{2} (74%)

A tepui (/ˈtɛpwi/), or tepuy (Spanish: [teˈpuj]), is a member of a family of table-top mountains or mesas found in northern South America, especially in Venezuela, western Guyana, and northern Brazil. The word tepui means "house of the gods" in the native tongue of the Pemon, the indigenous people who inhabit the Gran Sabana.

Tepuis tend to be found as isolated entities rather than in connected ranges, which makes them the host of a unique array of endemic plant and animal species. Notable tepuis include Auyantepui, Autana, Neblina, and Mount Roraima. They are typically composed of sheer blocks of Precambrian quartz arenite sandstone that rise abruptly from the jungle. Auyantepui is the source of Angel Falls, the world's tallest waterfall.

== Morphology ==
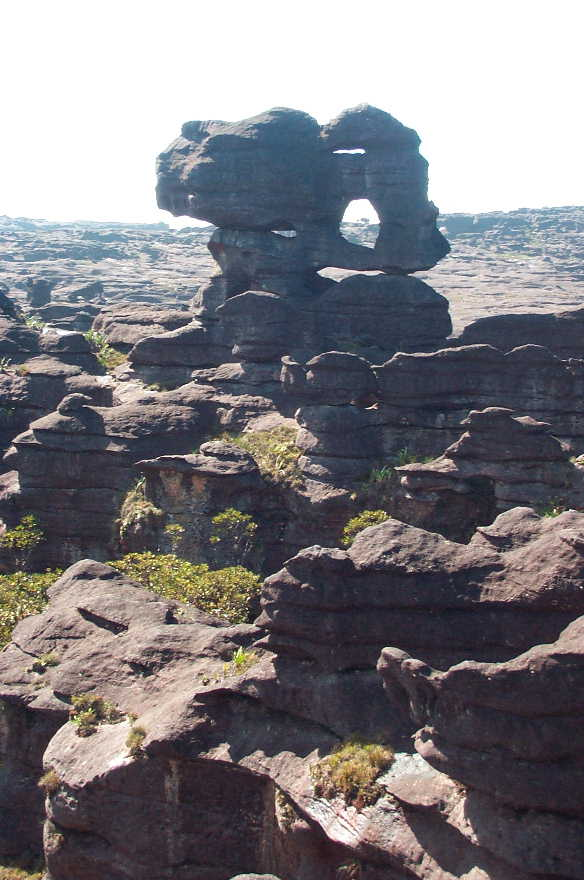
The plateau of Mount Roraima – the peculiar rock formation is caused by erosion.

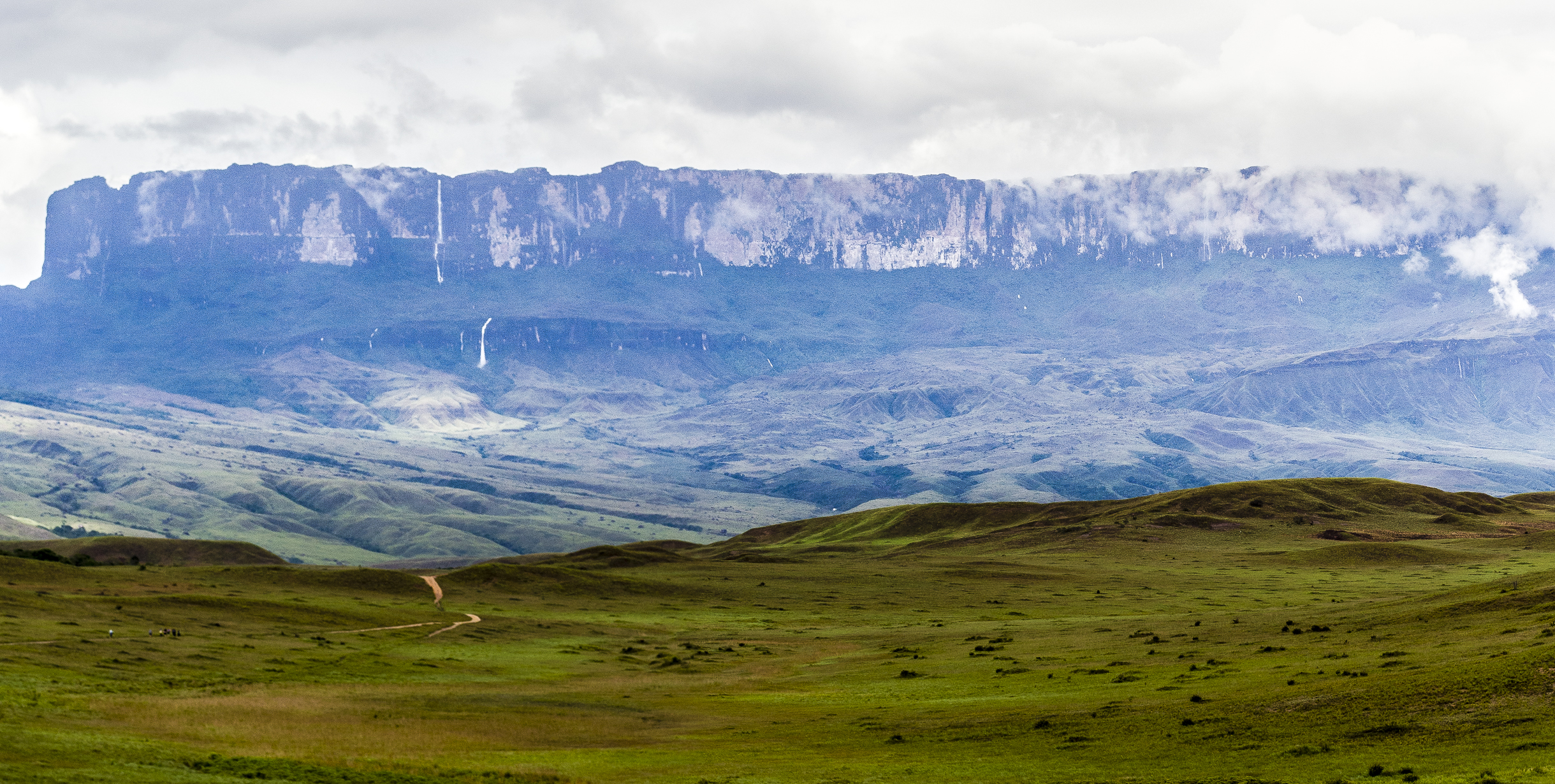
Mount Roraima

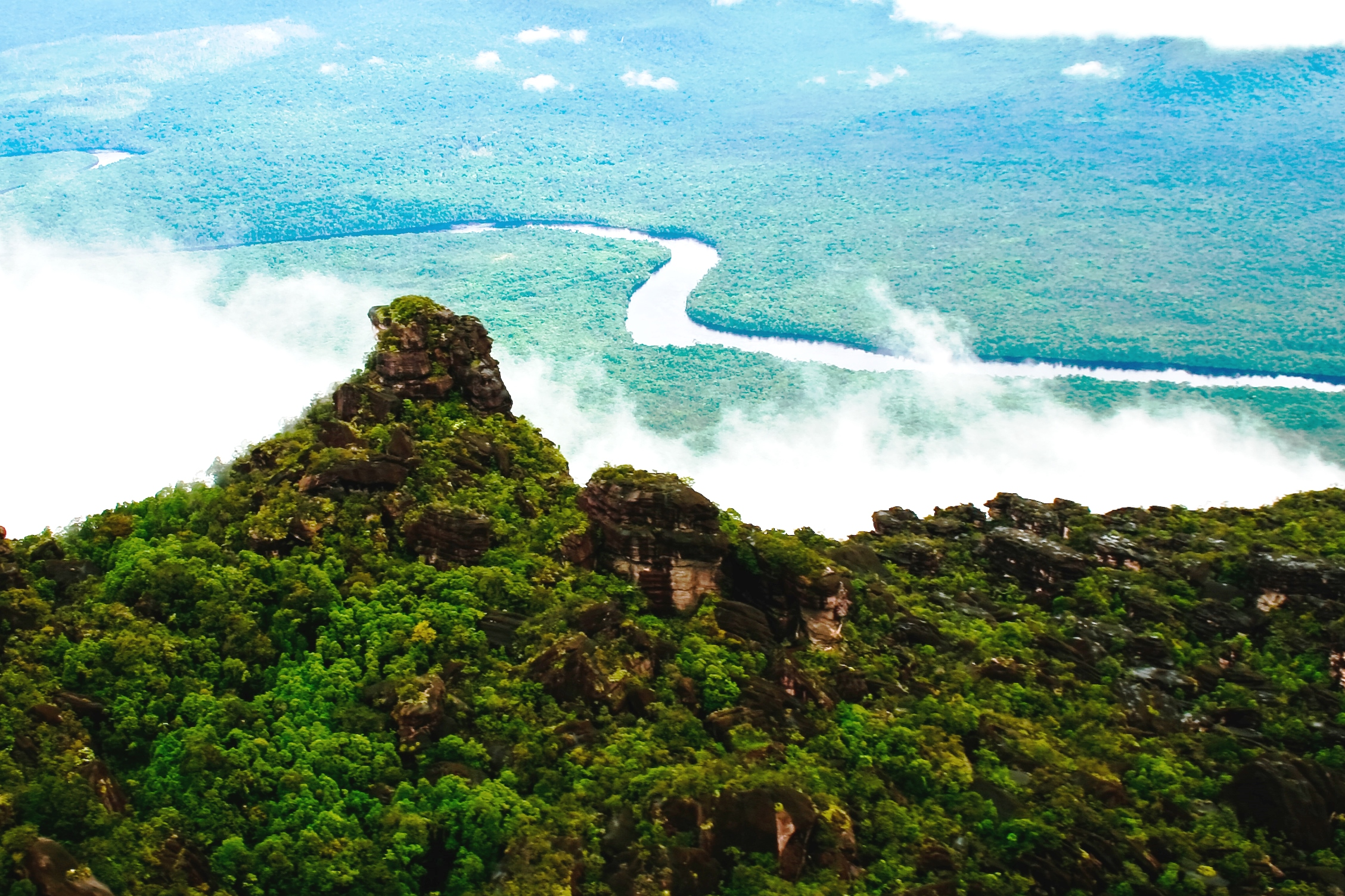
View of the Venezuelan Amazon from the top of a tepui

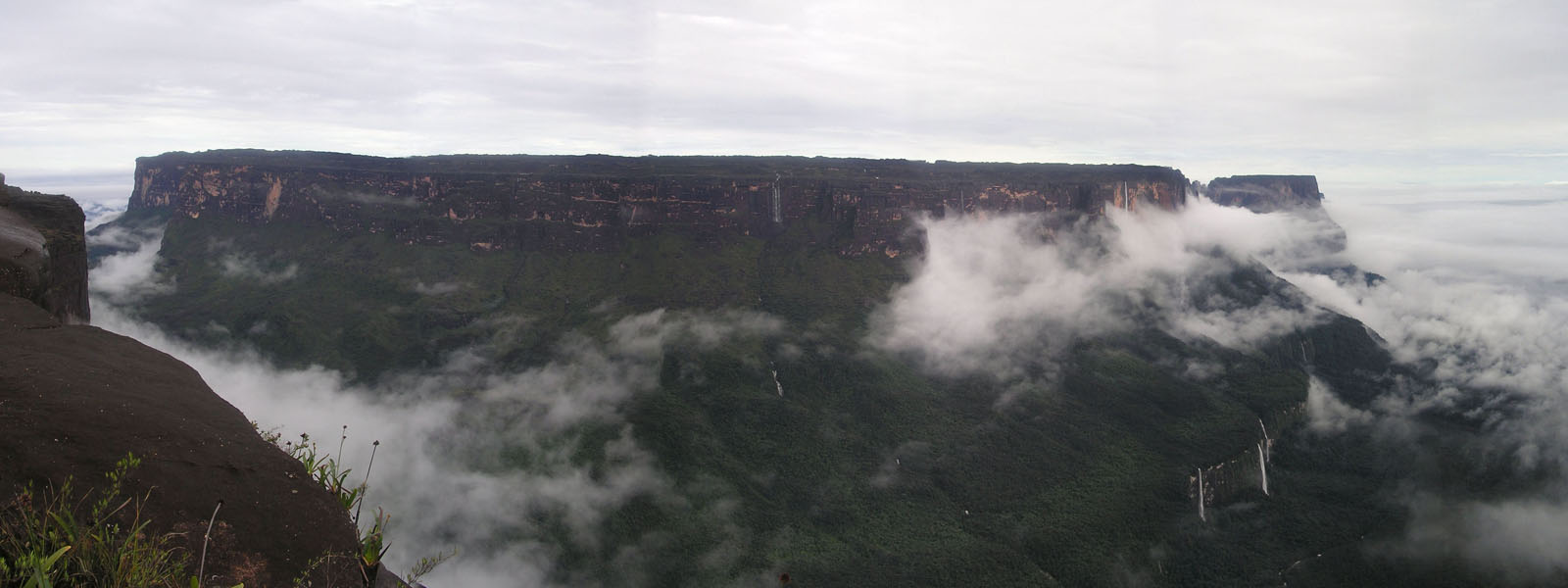
View of Kukenan tepui from top of Mt. Roraima

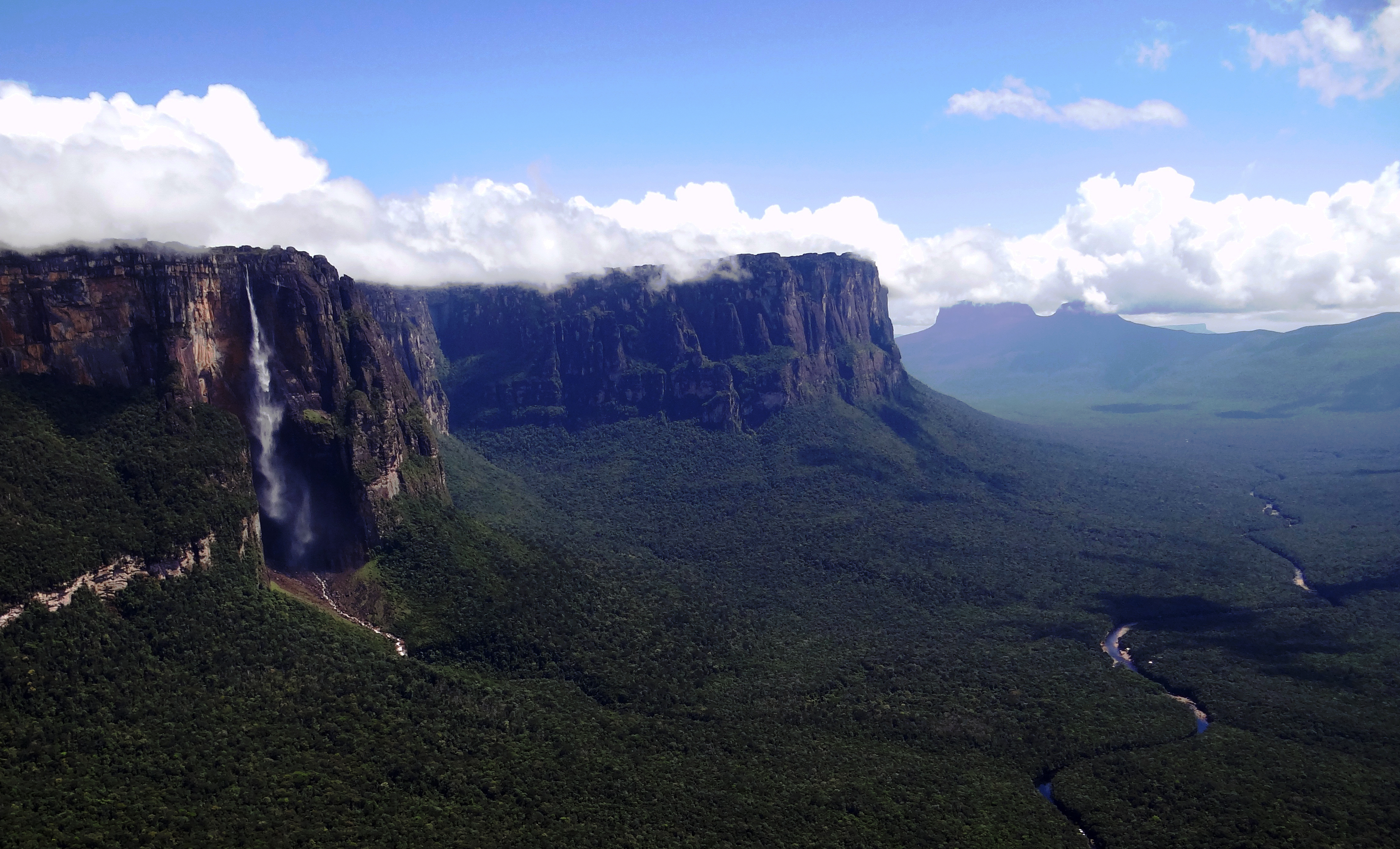
Devil's Canyon in the Canaima National Park

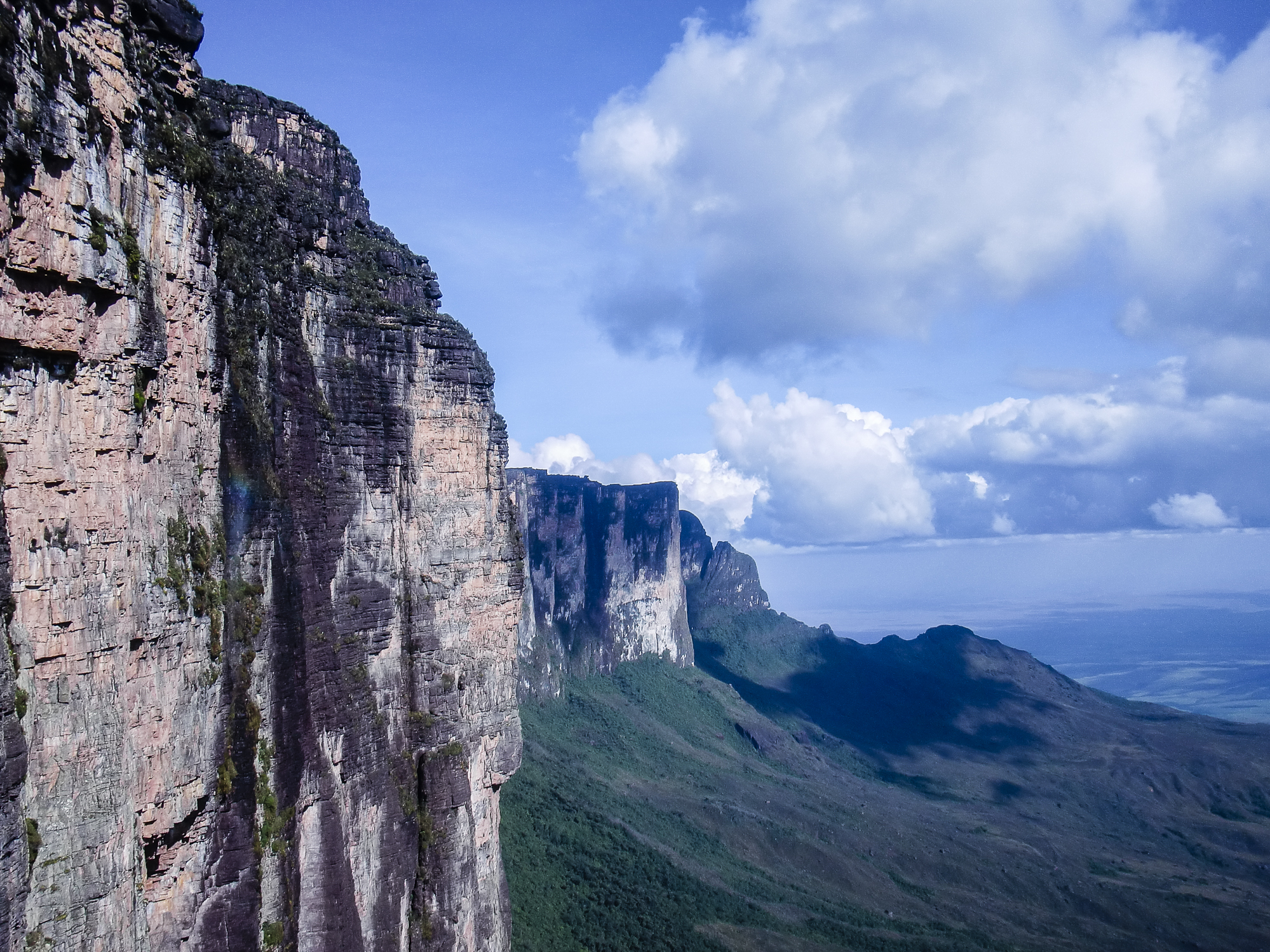
The steep rock wall of Mount Roraima

These table-top mountains are the remains of a large sandstone plateau that once covered the granite basement complex between the north border of the Amazon Basin and the Orinoco, between the Atlantic coast and the Rio Negro. This area is part of the remnants of the supercontinent Gondwana. Throughout the course of the history of Earth, the plateau began to erode and fragment about 300 million years ago (mya), and about 70 mya the tepuis were formed from the remaining monadnocks.

There are 115 such mesas in the Gran Sabana in the southeast of Venezuela on the border with Guyana and Brazil, where the highest concentration of tepuis is found. The precipitous tablelands tower over the surrounding area by up to 1,000 metres (3,000 ft). Tepuis range in elevation from 1,000–3,000 metres (3,000–10,000 ft). The total surface area of all 115 tepuis is approximately 5,000 km^{2} (2,000 sq mi).

Because of their great age, some tepuis exhibit surface features and caves typical of karst topography, formed in more water-soluble rocks such as limestone. Caves include the 671-metre-deep (2,201 ft) Abismo Guy Collet, the deepest quartzite cave in the world. Some of the mesas are pocked with giant sinkholes up to 300 meters (1,000 ft) in diameter and with sheer walls up to 300 meters (1,000 ft) deep. These sinkholes are formed when the roofs of tunnels carved by underground rivers collapse.

Berry, Huber, et al. (1995) sort the tepuis into four districts defined by geographical criteria (drainage basins) and floristic affinities.

- the Eastern Pantepui District is located east of the Caroni River in eastern Venezuela, western Guyana, and Roraima state of northern Brazil. It includes Mount Roraima, Auyan-tepui, and the Pacaraima Mountains. They are drained by the Caroni River, the Mazaruni and Essequibo rivers of Guyana, and the Rio Branco of Brazil.
- the Western Pantepui District in southwestern Venezuela bounded by the Caura, Orinoco, and Ventuari rivers. Mountains are of sandstone and granite with summits reaching between 1,300 and 2,350 meters elevation. It includes the granite Sierra Maigualida (1,800 to 2,350 m.). The Yutajé Subdistrict includes the Cerro Guanay, Cerro Yaví, Cerro Coro Coro, and Cerro Yutajé, with diverse shrublands and summits from 1,800 to 2,300 m. The Cuao-Sipapo Massif includes the westernmost tepuis, made of sandstone and granite and reaching 1,400 and 2,000 m.
- the Central Pantepui District includes Cerro Guaiquinima, Cerro Duida, Cerro Marahuaka, Cerro Huachamacari, and Cerro Yapacana.
- the Southern Pantepui District includes the mountains along Venezuela's southern border with Brazil's Amazonas state and includes Cerro de la Neblina, Cerro Aracamuni, and Cerro Avispa.

== Flora and fauna ==
The plateaus of the tepuis are completely isolated from the ground forest, making them ecological islands. The altitude causes them to have a different climate from the ground forest. The top presents cool temperatures with frequent rainfall, while the bases of the mountains have a tropical, warm and humid climate. A unique world of plants and animals has evolved over millennia. These endemic flora and fauna developed separately from the rest of the world, cut off by the imposing rock walls. Some tepui sinkholes contain species that have evolved in these "islands within islands" that are unique to that sinkhole. The tepuis are considered a distinct biogeographic region known as Pantepui.

The tepuis are often referred to as the Galápagos Islands of the mainland, having a large number of unique plants and animals not found anywhere else in the world. The floors of the mesas are poor in nutrients, which has led to a rich variety of carnivorous plants, such as Drosera and most species of Heliamphora, as well as a wide variety of orchids and bromeliads. The weathered, craggy nature of the rocky ground means no layers of humus are formed.

It has been hypothesized that endemics on tepuis represent relict fauna and flora that underwent vicariant speciation when the plateau became fragmented over geological time. However, recent studies suggest that tepuis are not as isolated as originally believed. For example, an endemic group of treefrogs, Tepuihyla, have diverged after the tepuis were formed; that is, speciation followed colonization from the lowlands.

The tepuis are a challenge for researchers, as they are home to a high number of species that have yet to be described. Some of these mountains are cloaked by thick clouds for nearly the entire year. Their surfaces could previously only be photographed by helicopter radar equipment.

Major botanical explorations of the tepuis started in the 19th century, including those of Alexander von Humboldt, Aimé Bonpland and Robert Schomburgk. From the 1950s onwards Julian Steyermark and Bassett Maguire started the Guayana Shield Program to document the entire flora of the Venezuelan tepuis and surrounding lowlands, and they undertook numerous expeditions. This program produced the Flora of the Venezuelan Guayana, a multi-volume work published between 1995 and 2005. It treated 2,447 species of vascular plants native to the Pantepui biogeographic province, 42% of which are endemic to the tepuis with up to 25% of species restricted to single mountains. Five botanical expeditions were undertaken to three Brazilian tepuis – Serra do Aracá, Pico da Neblina, and Monte Caburaí – from 2011 to 2014.

Many tepuis are in the Canaima National Park in Venezuela, which has been classified as a World Heritage Site by UNESCO.

== Selected tepuis ==
A few of the most notable of the 60 tepuis:

- Auyantepui is the largest of the tepuis with a surface area of 700 km^{2} (270 sq mi). Angel Falls, the highest waterfall in the world, drops from a cleft in the summit.
- Mount Roraima, also known as Roraima Tepui. A report by South American researcher Robert Schomburgk inspired the Scottish author Arthur Conan Doyle to write his novel The Lost World about the discovery of a living prehistoric world full of dinosaurs and other primordial creatures. The borders of Venezuela, Brazil, and Guyana meet on the top.
- Matawi Tepui, also known as Kukenán, because it is the source of the Kukenán River, is considered the "place of the dead" by the local Pemon peoples. It is located next to Mount Roraima in Venezuela.
- Autana Tepui stands 1,300 m (4,300 ft) above the forest floor. A unique cave runs from one side of the mountain to the other.
- Sarisariñama Tepui, famous for its almost perfectly circular sinkholes that go straight down from the mountain top. The largest such sinkhole is 300 m (1,000 ft) in diameter and depth (purportedly created by groundwater erosion). They harbour an ecosystem composed of unique plant and animal species at the bottom.
- Ilú-Tramen Massif is the most northerly mountain in the chain that stretches along the Venezuelan-Guyana border from Roraima in the south.
- Tafelberg in central Suriname is the easternmost tepui.
- Steve Backshall was part of the first expedition to successfully climb Mount Upuigma. The expedition was part of the program Lost Land of the Jaguar on BBC One in 2008. On the summit they discovered an endemic species of frog and mouse, and also footprints of an unidentified mammal.

== See also ==
- Canaima National Park – National park in Venezuela
- Geography of South America
