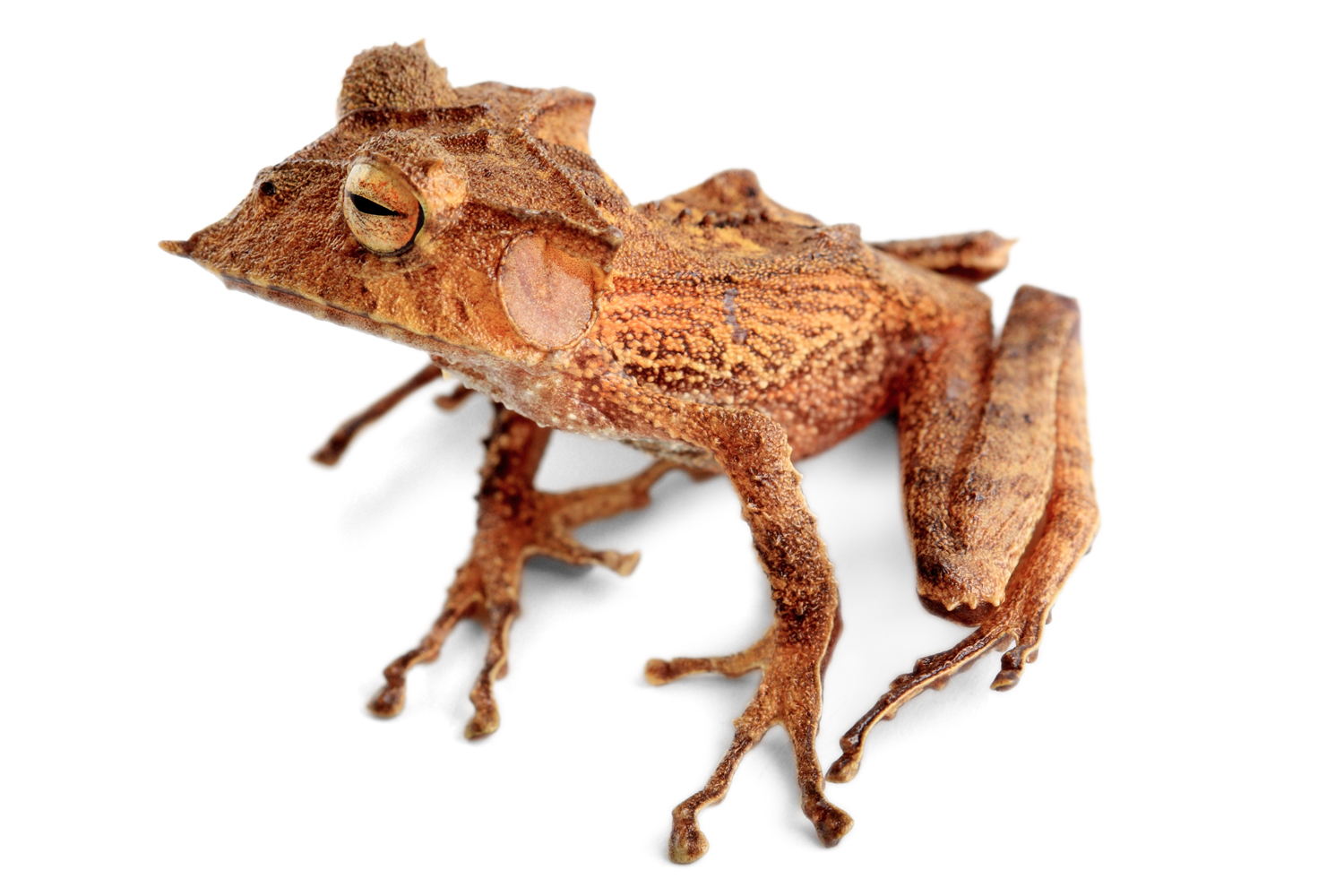
- Hemiphractus bubalus

Scientific classification
- Kingdom: Animalia
- Phylum: Chordata
- Class: Amphibia
- Order: Anura
- Superfamily: Hyloidea
- Family: Hemiphractidae; Peters, 1862

Type genus
- Hemiphractus Wagler, 1828

Genera
- 6, see text

= Hemiphractidae =

Family of amphibians

The Hemiphractidae are a family of frogs from South and Central America. Previously, this group had been classified as a subfamily (Hemiphractinae) under family Hylidae. More recent research classifies these genera into their own family, or sometimes into three separate families: Amphignathodontidae (Flectonotus and Gastrotheca), Cryptobatrachidae (Cryptobatrachus and Stefania), and Hemiphractidae (Hemiphractus and Fritziana). An active question still exists as to which of these groupings is more accurate.

== Breeding behavior ==
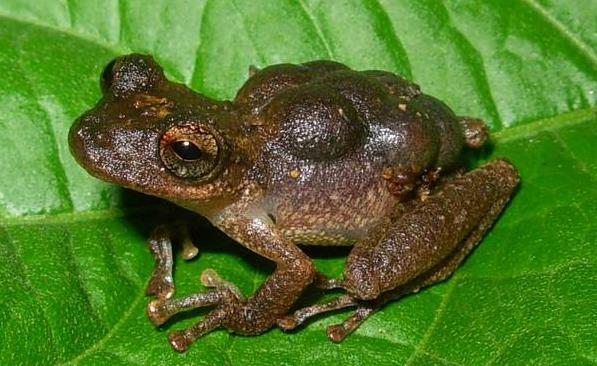
A female Flectonotus pygmaeus with eggs enclosed on the back

An unusual and unique adaptation in this family is the breeding behavior where the eggs are carried on the female's back; the eggs may develop into froglets on the back of the female without free-swimming tadpole stage, be released after hatching as tadpoles, or be deposited in water to complete their development there. In some species (genus Gastrotheca and some Flectonotus), this goes as far as to enclose the eggs in a pouch until they hatch. Males in amplexus have been observed to play an active role in placing the eggs on the back or in the pouch of the female. In some species, froglets may stay on the female's back after hatching.

== Taxonomy ==
The Hemiphractidae are divided into these genera:

- Cryptobatrachus — backpack frogs
- Flectonotus — Brazilian treefrogs
- Fritziana
- Gastrotheca — marsupial frogs
- Hemiphractus — horned treefrogs
- Stefania — carrying frogs
