= List of near threatened amphibians =

- Extinct in the wild (EW): 2 species
- Critically endangered (CR): 825 species
- Endangered (EN): 1,291 species
- Vulnerable (VU): 815 species
- Near threatened (NT): 453 species
- Least concern (LC): 3,733 species
- Data deficient (DD): 896 species
Amphibian species (IUCN, 2025-2)
- 8052 extant species have been evaluated
- 7156 of those are fully assessed (Note: excludes data deficient evaluations.)
- 4186 are not threatened at present (Note: NT and LC.)
- 2931 to 3827 are threatened (Note: Threatened comprises CR, EN and VU. Upper estimate additionally includes DD.)
- 35 to 148 are extinct or extinct in the wild:
  - 37 extinct (EX) species (Note: Chart omits extinct (EX) species)
  - 2 extinct in the wild (EW)

Near threatened (NT) species do not currently qualify for critically endangered (CR), endangered (EN) or vulnerable (VU), but are likely to qualify for a threatened category in the near future, or are already close to qualifying.

As of December 2025, the International Union for Conservation of Nature (IUCN) lists 453 near threatened amphibian species. 5.6% of all evaluated amphibian species are listed as near threatened.

This is a complete list of near threatened amphibian species evaluated by the IUCN, last substantially updated August 2022.

== Caudata ==
Salamanders

=== Hynobiidae ===
Asiatic salamanders

- Taiwan lesser salamander (Hynobius fucus)
- Mahoroba salamander (Hynobius guttatus)
- Hynobius hirosei
- Setouchi salamander (Hynobius setouchi)
- Amber-colored salamander (Hynobius stejnegeri)
- Tsushima salamander (Hynobius tsuensis)
- Fischer’s clawed salamander (Onychodactylus fischeri)
- Bandai clawed salamander (Onychodactylus intermedius)
- Liaoning clawed salamander (Onychodactylus zhaoermii)

=== Salamandridae ===
True salamanders and newts

- Golden-striped salamander (Chioglossa lusitanica)
- Japanese fire-bellied newt (Cynops pyrrhogaster)
- Caucasian salamander (Mertensiella caucasica)
- Striped newt (Notophthalmus perstriatus)
- Northern banded newt (Ommatotriton ophryticus)
- Guidong stout newt (Pachytriton archospotus)
- Spot-tailed warty newt (Paramesotriton caudopunctatus)
- Hong Kong warty newt (Paramesotriton hongkongensis)
- California newt (Taricha torosa)
- Southern marbled newt (Triturus pygmaeus)
- Black knobby newt (Tylototriton asperrimus)
- Crocodile newt (Tylototriton verrucosus)

=== Ambystomatidae ===
Mole salamanders

- California giant salamander (Dicamptodon ensatus)

=== Rhyacotritonidae ===
Torrent salamanders

- Cascade torrent salamander (Rhyacotriton cascadae)
- Columbia torrent salamander (Rhyacotriton kezeri)
- Olympic torrent salamander (Rhyacotriton olympicus)

=== Plethodontidae ===
Lungless salamanders

- Green salamander (Aneides aeneus)
- Sacramento Mountain salamander (Aneides hardii)
- Inyo Mountains salamander (Batrachoseps campi)
- Kern Plateau salamander (Batrachoseps robustus)
- Peter's mushroomtongue salamander (Bolitoglossa adspersa)
- Chinateca salamander (Bolitoglossa chinanteca)
- Doflein's salamander (Bolitoglossa dofleini)
- Lincoln's climbing salamander (Bolitoglossa lincolni)
- O'Donnell's salamander (Bolitoglossa odonnelli)
- Medellin mushroomtongue salamander (Bolitoglossa phalarosoma)
- Ramos' mushroomtongue salamander (Bolitoglossa ramosi)
- Longnose mushroomtongue salamander (Bolitoglossa rostrata)
- Savage's mushroomtongue salamander (Bolitoglossa savagei)
- Shadowy web-footed salamander (Bolitoglossa sombra)
- Walker's salamander (Bolitoglossa walkeri)
- Primeval splayfoot salamander (Chiropterotriton priscus)
- Cumberland dusky salamander (Desmognathus abditus)
- Seepage salamander (Desmognathus aeneus)
- Imitator salamander (Desmognathus imitator)
- Oklahoma salamander (Eurycea tynerensis)
- Costa Rica worm salamander (Oedipina cyclocauda)
- Caddo Mountain salamander (Plethodon caddoensis)
- Del Norte salamander (Plethodon elongatus)
- Red-cheeked salamander (Plethodon jordani)
- Cheat Mountain salamander (Plethodon nettingi)
- Rich Mountain salamander (Plethodon ouachitae)
- White-spotted salamander (Plethodon punctatus)
- Shenandoah Mountain salamander (Plethodon virginia)
- Imperial cave salamander (Speleomantes imperialis)
- Sierra Juarez moss salamander (Thorius adelos)

== Anura ==
Frogs

=== Eleutherodactylidae ===
Robber frogs

- Eleutherodactylus dimidiatus
- Eileen's robber frog (Eleutherodactylus eileenae)
- Eleutherodactylus flavescens
- Martinique robber frog (Eleutherodactylus martinicensis)
- Coastal red-rumped frog (Eleutherodactylus paralius)
- Sierra Madre piping frog (Eleutherodactylus saxatilis)
- Cuban cave frog (Eleutherodactylus thomasi)

=== Rhacophoridae ===
Shrub frogs

- Pseudophilautus rus
- Rhacophorus prasinatus
- Rhacophorus zhaojuensis

=== Bufonidae ===
True toads

- Luidan stream toad (Ansonia platysoma)
- Bufo tuberculatus
- Kerala stream toad (Ghatophryne rubigina)
- Incilius leucomyos
- Melanophryniscus cupreuscapularis
- Maldonada redbelly toad (Melanophryniscus moreirae)
- Melanophryniscus sanmartini
- Nyika dwarf toad (Mertensophryne nyikae)
- Osornophryne bufoniformis
- Pelophryne api
- Blomberg's toad (Rhaebo blombergi)
- Concepcion toad (Rhinella arunco)

=== Craugastoridae ===
Fleshbelly frogs

- Montane dirt frog (Craugastor aenigmaticus)
- Sierra Juarez robber frog (Craugastor polymniae)
- Limestone rainfrog (Craugastor psephosypharus)
- Long-legged stream frog (Craugastor sabrinus)
- Yucatan robber frog (Craugastor yucatanensis)
- Dischidodactylus colonnelloi
- Dischidodactylus duidensis

=== Strabomantidae ===
Cloud forest groundfrogs

- Luderwaldt's highland frog (Holoaden luederwaldti)
- Acjanaco puna frog (Noblella usurpator)
- Oreobates barituensis
- Abakapa rain frog (Pristimantis abakapa)
- Pristimantis adnus
- Attenborough's rubber frog (Pristimantis attenboroughi)
- Auyantepui rain frog (Pristimantis auricarens)
- Pristimantis baiotis
- Pristimantis cantitans
- Porvenir robber frog (Pristimantis crucifer)
- Cryptic robber frog (Pristimantis cryptomelas)
- Pristimantis farisorum
- Pristimantis fetosus
- Andean cricket frog (Pristimantis gryllus)
- Guaiquinima rain frog (Pristimantis guaiquinimensis)
- Pristimantis illotus
- Pristimantis jubatus
- Leon's robber frog (Pristimantis leoni)
- Pristimantis limoncochensis
- Pristimantis marahuaka
- Pristimantis melanogaster
- Pristimantis muscosus
- Pristimantis nephophilus
- Pristimantis orpacobates
- Peters' robber frog (Pristimantis petersi)
- Pristimantis philipi
- Pristimantis pirrensis
- Pristimantis pluvian
- Pristimantis quicato
- Trench robber frog (Pristimantis rubicundus)
- Pristimantis sanguineus
- Sarisariñama rain frog (Pristimantis sarisarinama)
- Pyburn's robber frog (Pristimantis savagei)
- Albania robber frog (Pristimantis simoterus)
- Pristimantis stictus
- Thymelen robber frog (Pristimantis thymelensis)
- Zacualtipan robber frog (Pristimantis verecundus)
- Coconuco robber frog (Pristimantis vicarius)
- Yánez rain frog (Pristimantis yanezi)
- Pristimantis yaviensis
- Pristimantis zophus
- Ground robber frog (Serranobatrachus insignitus)
- San Lorenzo robber frog (Serranobatrachus megalops)
- Santa Marta robber frog (Serranobatrachus sanctaemartae)
- Cebolleta robber frog (Tachiramantis tayrona)

=== Aromobatidae ===
Cryptic forest frogs

- Spotted nurse frog (Allobates algorei)
- Goias rocket frog (Allobates goianus)
- Anomaloglossus apiau
- Anomaloglossus breweri
- Anomaloglossus guanayensis
- Sarisariñama rocket frog (Anomaloglossus moffetti)
- Chimantá poison frog (Anomaloglossus rufulus)
- Shreve's rocket frog (Anomaloglossus shrevei)
- Hermina's poison frog (Mannophryne herminae)
- Turimiquire collared frog (Mannophryne leonardoi)
- Mannophryne oblitterata
- Urticant collared frog (Mannophryne urticans)
- Paria collared frog (Mannophryne venezuelensis)
- Caracas collared frog (Mannophryne vulcano)

=== Centrolenidae ===
Glass frogs

- Antioquia giant glass frog (Centrolene antioquiensis)
- Mache cochran frog (Cochranella mache)
- Ramirez's cochran frog (Cochranella ramirezi)
- Hyalinobatrachium fragile
- Hyalinobatrachium pallidum
- Rio Azuela glass frog (Hyalinobatrachium pellucidum)
- Nymphargus chami
- Nymphargus spilotus
- McDiarmid's glass frog (Rulyrana mcdiarmidi)
- Cuzco cochran frog (Rulyrana spiculata)
- Rulyrana susatamai

=== Megophryidae ===
Litter frogs

- Leptobrachella alpina
- Kinabalu slender litter frog (Leptobrachella arayai)
- Dring's Borneo frog (Leptobrachella brevicrus)
- Itioka's dwarf litter frog (Leptobrachella itiokai)
- Leptobrachella maoershanensis
- Stone litter toad (Leptobrachella petrops)
- Striped dwarf litter frog (Leptobrachella serasanae)
- Shangsi leaf litter toad (Leptobrachella shangsiensis)
- Leptobrachium gunungense
- Montane slender litter frog (Leptobrachella maura)
- Kinabalu horned frog (Megophrys baluensis)
- Chuanan short-legged toad (Megophrys chuannanensis)
- Megophrys feii
- Palawan horned frog (Megophrys ligayae)
- Yu Shen horned toad (Megophrys ombrophila)
- Pope's short-legged toad (Megophrys popei)
- Wuliangshan horned toad (Megophrys wuliangshanensis)
- Oreolalax granulosus
- Oreolalax schmidti
- Dring's horned frog (Sarawakiphrys dringi)
- Nepal lazy toad (Scutiger nepalensis)

=== Arthroleptidae ===
Screeching frogs

- Freetown long-fingered frog (Arthroleptis aureoli)
- Guinea screeching frog (Arthroleptis crusculum)
- Krokosua squeaking frog (Arthroleptis krokosua)
- Astylosternus laticephalus
- Mountain night frog (Astylosternus montanus)
- Mukuzira long-fingered frog (Cardioglossa cyaneospila)
- Cardioglossa nigromaculata
- Amani forest tree frog (Leptopelis macrotis)
- Tai forest tree frog (Leptopelis occidentalis)
- Uluguru forest tree frog (Leptopelis uluguruensis)

=== Hemiphractidae ===
Marsupial frogs, horned treefrogs, backpack frogs, and allies

- Gastrotheca aguaruna
- San Lucas marsupial frog (Gastrotheca pseustes)
- Ruiz's marsupial frog (Gastrotheca ruizi)
- Tepuis tree frog (Stefania ginesi)
- Vegas Falls treefrog (Stefania goini)
- Marahuaca treefrog (Stefania marahuaquensis)
- Sarisariñama carrying frog (Stefania riae)
- Stefania satelles
- Auyantepui carrying frog (Stefania schuberti)

=== Cycloramphidae ===
Button frogs and allies

- Cycloramphus lithomimeticus

=== Dendrobatidae ===
Poison dart frogs

- Colostethus ruthveni
- Anthony's poison arrow frog (Epipedobates anthonyi)
- Chimbo rocket frog (Hyloxalus infraguttatus)
- Lehmann's rocket frog (Hyloxalus lehmanni)
- Espada's rocket frog (Hyloxalus pulchellus)
- Oophaga sylvatica

=== Mantellidae ===
Mantellid frogs

- Aglyptodactylus chorus
- Boophis elenae
- Boophis obscurus
- Boophis periegetes
- Boophis quasiboehmei
- Boophis rufioculis
- Gephyromantis blanci
- Decary's Madagascar frog (Gephyromantis decaryi)
- Gephyromantis leucocephalus
- Mantidactylus cowanii
- Isaka-ivondro Madagascar frog (Spinomantis bertini)
- Elegant Madagascar frog (Spinomantis elegans)

=== Dicroglossidae ===
Fork-tongued frogs

- Rough-backed river frog (Limnonectes ibanorum)
- Inger's wart frog (Limnonectes ingeri)
- Luzon fanged frog (Limnonectes macrocephalus)
- Giant Philippine frog (Limnonectes magnus)
- Malesian frog (Limnonectes malesianus)
- Lesser swamp frog (Limnonectes paramacrodon)
- Limnonectes rhacodus
- Tweedie's wart frog (Limnonectes tweediei)
- Annandale's paa frog (Nanorana annandalii)
- Nanorana ercepeae
- Tibetan frog (Nanorana pleskei)
- Kwang-yang Asian frog (Nanorana quadranus)

=== Microhylidae ===
Narrow-mouthed frogs

- Boulenger's climbing frog (Anodonthyla boulengeri)
- Buzzing frog (Cophixalus bombiens)
- Rattling frog (Cophixalus crepitans)
- Scanty frog (Cophixalus exiguus)
- Tomato frog (Dyscophus antongilii)
- Elachistocleis erythrogaster
- Blunt-headed burrowing frog (Glyphoglossus molossus)
- Kalophrynus baluensis
- Kalophrynus nubicola
- Burrowing grainy frog (Kalophrynus subterrestris)
- Bicol narrowmouth toad (Kaloula kokacii)
- Middle back-stripe bullfrog (Kaloula mediolineata)
- Labang forest rice frog (Microhyla perparva)
- Kapit rice frog (Microhyla petrigena)
- Oreophryne jeffersoniana
- Interior digging frog (Plethodontohyla tuberata)
- Betampona digging frog (Rhombophryne coudreaui)
- Madagascar rain frog (Scaphiophryne madagascariensis)
- Scaphiophryne matsoko
- Uperodon montanus
- Uperodon obscurus

=== Ranidae ===
True frogs

- Pianma torrent frog (Amolops bellulus)
- Amolops cremnobatus
- Amolops daiyunensis
- Amolops lifanensis
- Amolops viridimaculatus
- Chalcorana macrops
- Bicolored frog (Clinotarsus curtipes)
- Glandirana tientaiensis
- Hylarana banjarana
- Hylarana chitwanensis
- Hylarana moellendorffi
- Hylarana similis
- Indosylvirana temporalis
- Crawfish frog (Lithobates areolatus)
- Gopher frog (Lithobates capito)
- Maya Mountains frog (Lithobates juliani)
- Transverse volcanic leopard frog (Lithobates neovolcanicus)
- Kiau Borneo frog (Meristogenys kinabaluensis)
- Kapit Borneo frog (Meristogenys phaeomerus)
- Malaysian Borneo frog (Meristogenys poecilus)
- Whitehead's Borneo frog (Meristogenys whiteheadi)
- Vietnam sucker frog (Odorrana chapaensis)
- Yunnanfu frog (Odorrana grahami)
- Lung-shen-hsien frog (Odorrana lungshengensis)
- Pelophylax caralitanus
- Dark-spotted frog (Pelophylax nigromaculatus)
- Foothill yellow-legged frog (Rana boylii)
- Cascades frog (Rana cascadae)

=== Phrynobatrachidae ===
Puddle frogs

- Rugegewald river frog (Phrynobatrachus acutirostris)
- Ghana river frog (Phrynobatrachus ghanensis)
- Phrynobatrachus uzungwensis

=== Hylidae ===
Tree frogs and allies

- Sierra Juarez brook frog (Duellmanohyla ignicolor)
- Salvador stream frog (Duellmanohyla salvadorensis)
- Southern highland tree frog (Hyla euphorbiacea)
- Hyloscirtus alytolylax
- Bogota treefrog (Hyloscirtus bogotensis)
- Sardinata tree frog (Hyloscirtus callipeza)
- La Loma tree frog (Hyloscirtus colymba)
- Jahn's tree frog (Hyloscirtus jahni)
- Cordillera central tree frog (Hyloscirtus larinopygion)
- White-black tree frog (Hypsiboas alboniger)
- Hypsiboas cipoensis
- Isthmohyla melacaena
- Volcan Barba treefrog (Isthmohyla picadoi)
- Zetek's treefrog (Isthmohyla zeteki)
- Chameleon tree frog (Myersiohyla chamaeleo)
- Marahuaca odorous frog (Myersiohyla inparquesi)
- Myersiohyla loveridgei
- Southeastern Brazil snouted tree frog (Ololygon melloi)
- Phrynomedusa appendiculata
- Cloud forest stream frog (Ptychohyla euthysanota)
- Lesser bromeliad treefrog (Sarcohyla arborescandens)
- Scinax oreites
- Scinax trapicheiroi
- Blue-spotted Mexican tree frog (Smilisca cyanosticta)
- Monte Duida treefrog (Tepuihyla aecii)
- Marahuaca treefrog (Tepuihyla luteolabris)
- Rodriguez's Amazon treefrog (Tepuihyla rodriguezi)
- Spiny-headed tree frog (Triprion spinosus)

=== Pelodryadidae ===
Australian treefrogs

- Cooloola sedge frog (Drymomantis cooloolensis)
- Common mist frog (Mosleyia rheocola)
- Rhyaconastes jungguy

=== Hyperoliidae ===
African reed frogs

- Nigeria banana frog (Afrixalus nigeriensis)
- Natal banana frog (Afrixalus spinifrons)
- Nimba banana frog (Afrixalus vibekensis)
- Sharpsnout reed frog (Hyperolius acutirostris)
- Bamenda reed frog (Hyperolius ademetzi)
- Sierra Leone reed frog (Hyperolius chlorosteus)
- Goldbelly reed frog (Hyperolius chrysogaster)
- Tigoni reed frog (Hyperolius cystocandicans)
- Wermuth's reed frog (Hyperolius wermuthi)
- Nimba reed frog (Hyperolius zonatus)
- Chochran's running frog (Kassina cochranae)

=== Pyxicephalidae ===
Box-headed frogs

- Drewes' moss frog (Arthroleptella drewesii)
- Landdros moss frog (Arthroleptella landdrosia)
- Lightfoot's moss frog (Arthroleptella lightfooti)
- Cape caco (Cacosternum capense)
- Flat caco (Cacosternum platys)
- Kloof frog (Natalobatrachus bonebergi)
- Montane marsh frog (Poyntonia paludicola)

=== Leptodactylidae ===
Southern frogs

- Adenomera cotuba
- Adenomera martinezi
- Jaboticatubas frog (Leptodactylus camaquara)
- Santa Fe frog (Leptodactylus laticeps)
- Marambaia white-lipped frog (Leptodactylus marambaiae)
- Calf frog (Leptodactylus turimiquensis)
- Physalaemus erythros
- Evangelista's foam froglet (Physalaemus evangelistai)
- Physalaemus maximus
- Achala's four-eyed frog (Pleurodema kriegi)

=== Hylodidae ===
Tree toads and allies

- Minas Gerais spinythumb frog (Crossodactylus trachystomus)
- Caparao Mountains tree toad (Hylodes babax)
- Hylodes japi

=== Ceratobatrachidae ===
Wrinkled ground frogs and allies

- King dwarf mountain frog (Alcalus rajae)
- Gilliard's wrinkled ground frog (Cornufer gilliardi)
- Fiji ground frog (Cornufer vitianus)
- Fiji tree frog (Cornufer vitiensis)
- Alpine papilla-tongued frog (Liurana alpina)
- Banahao forest frog (Platymantis banahao)
- Platymantis biak
- Platymantis cagayanensis
- Platymantis indeprensus
- Platymantis luzonensis
- Platymantis naomii
- Negros forest frog (Platymantis negrosensis)
- Platymantis pseudodorsalis

=== Myobatrachidae ===
Australian water frogs

- Northern Flinders Ranges froglet (Crinia flindersensis)
- Tasmanian froglet (Crinia tasmaniensis)
- Red-crowned toadlet (Pseudophryne australis)
- Tyler's toadlet (Uperoleia tyleri)

=== Hemisotidae ===
Shovelnose frogs

- Short-fingered piglet frog (Hemisus brachydactylus)
- Spotted snout-burrower (Hemisus guttatus)

=== Odontophrynidae ===
Odontophrynid frogs

- Proceratophrys paviotii
- Proceratophrys rotundipalpebra

=== Ptychadenidae ===
Grassland frogs

- Broadley's ridged frog (Ptychadena broadleyi)
- Erlanger's grassland frog (Ptychadena erlangeri)

=== Other frog species ===
- Black spiny-chest frog (Alsodes nodosus)
- Southern torrent frog (Arthroleptides yakusini)
- Corsican painted frog (Discoglossus montalentii)
- Gundia frog (Indirana gundia)
- Purple frog (Nasikabatrachus sahyadrensis)
- Western spadefoot toad (Spea hammondii)
- Acancocha water frog (Telmatobius jelskii)
- Spotted leaping frog (Walkerana diplosticta)

== Gymnophiona ==
Caecilians

- West Forest caecilian (Gymnopis syntrema)
- Metang caecilian (Ichthyophis biangularis)
- Long-headed caecilian (Ichthyophis longicephalus)
- Cauca caecilian (Caecilia occidentalis)

== See also ==
- Lists of IUCN Red List near threatened species
- List of least concern amphibians
- List of vulnerable amphibians
- List of endangered amphibians
- List of critically endangered amphibians
- List of recently extinct amphibians
- List of data deficient amphibians
