= Great elaenia =

Conservation status
- Least Concern (IUCN 3.1)

Scientific classification
- Kingdom: Animalia
- Phylum: Chordata
- Class: Aves
- Order: Passeriformes
- Family: Tyrannidae
- Genus: Elaenia
- Species: E. dayi

Binomial name
- Elaenia dayi Chapman, 1929

Subspecies
- See text

Species of bird

The great elaenia (Elaenia dayi) is a species of bird in subfamily Elaeniinae of family Tyrannidae, the tyrant flycatchers. It is found in Brazil and Venezuela.

== Taxonomy and systematics ==
The great elaenia has three subspecies, the nominate E. d. dayi (Chapman, 1929), E. d. auyantepui (Zimmer, JT & Phelps, WH, 1952), and E. d. tyleri (Chapman, 1929). The last had been originally described as a separate species. The great elaenia, the highland elaenia (E. obscura), and the small-headed elaenia (E. sordida) are sister species.

== Description ==
The great elaenia is about 20 cm (7.9 in) long and weighs 29 to 40 g (1.0 to 1.4 oz). It is the largest elaenia; it has a long tail and a very small or no crest. The sexes have the same plumage. Adults of the nominate subspecies have a dark sooty brown head with a blacker crown, lighter cheeks, and a thin whitish broken eyering. Their upperparts are dark sooty brown. Their wings are mostly dark sooty brown with whitish edges on some flight feathers. The tips of their wing coverts are whitish and show as two bars on the closed wing. Their tail is dusky. Their underparts are mostly dull olive-gray with a lighter throat and a pale yellowish belly. Subspecies E. d. tyleri is larger than the nominate but otherwise the same. E. d. auyantepui is midway between the other two subspecies in size and darker than both, with a gray cast from the chin to the breast and a duller yellow belly. Both sexes of all subspecies have a dark brown iris, a small black bill with a pale base to the mandible, and black legs and feet.

== Distribution and habitat ==
The great elaenia is a bird of the tepui region of southeastern Venezuela and extreme northwestern Brazil. The nominate subspecies is found on the mountains of the Gran Sabana, on several tepuis in southeastern Venezuela, and on both the Venezuelan and Brazilian sides of Mount Roraima. Subspecies E. d. tyleri is found in Venezuela on cerros Parú, Huachamacari, Marahuaca, and Duida in Amazonas state and on Meseta del Cerro Jaua in Bolívar state. E. d. auyantepui is found only on Auyán-tepui in Bolívar. Some sources say that the species might also occur in Guyana but the South American Classification Committee of the American Ornithological Society has no records from that country.

On the Gran Sabana the great elaenia inhabits stunted savanna woodland, isolated trees, and shrubby areas. On the slopes and summits of the tepuis it inhabits the interior and shrubby edges of humid montane forest. In elevation it ranges between 300 and 2,600 m (1,000 and 8,500 ft) though almost all records are above 1,800 m (5,900 ft).

== Behavior ==
=== Movement ===
The great elaenia is a year-round resident throughout its range.

=== Feeding ===
The great elaenia feeds primarily on insects but also includes a variety of small fruits in its diet. It forages singly or in pairs, in the middle and upper levels of the forest, sometimes in the open and sometimes hidden. It finds food by gleaning while perched and while briefly hovering.

=== Breeding ===
The great elaenia's breeding season has not been established but includes February on Auyán-tepui. Nothing else is known about the species' breeding biology.

=== Vocalization ===
The great elaenia's primary vocalization is "an odd, rather loud, somewhat variable SQUEEE'ch'ch'ch-cheet-cheet, 1st note high, [middle] part rattling", and is sometimes shortened.

== Status ==
The IUCN has assessed the great elaenia as being of Least Concern. Its population size is not known and is believed to be decreasing. No immediate threats have been identified. It is considered generally rare to fairly common, and common on Mount Roraima especially in the rainy season. Most of its locations are within national parks. "The tepuis within its range are generally inaccessible, and therefore not overly affected by human disturbance, but vegetation is especially sensitive to fire and other disturbances."
