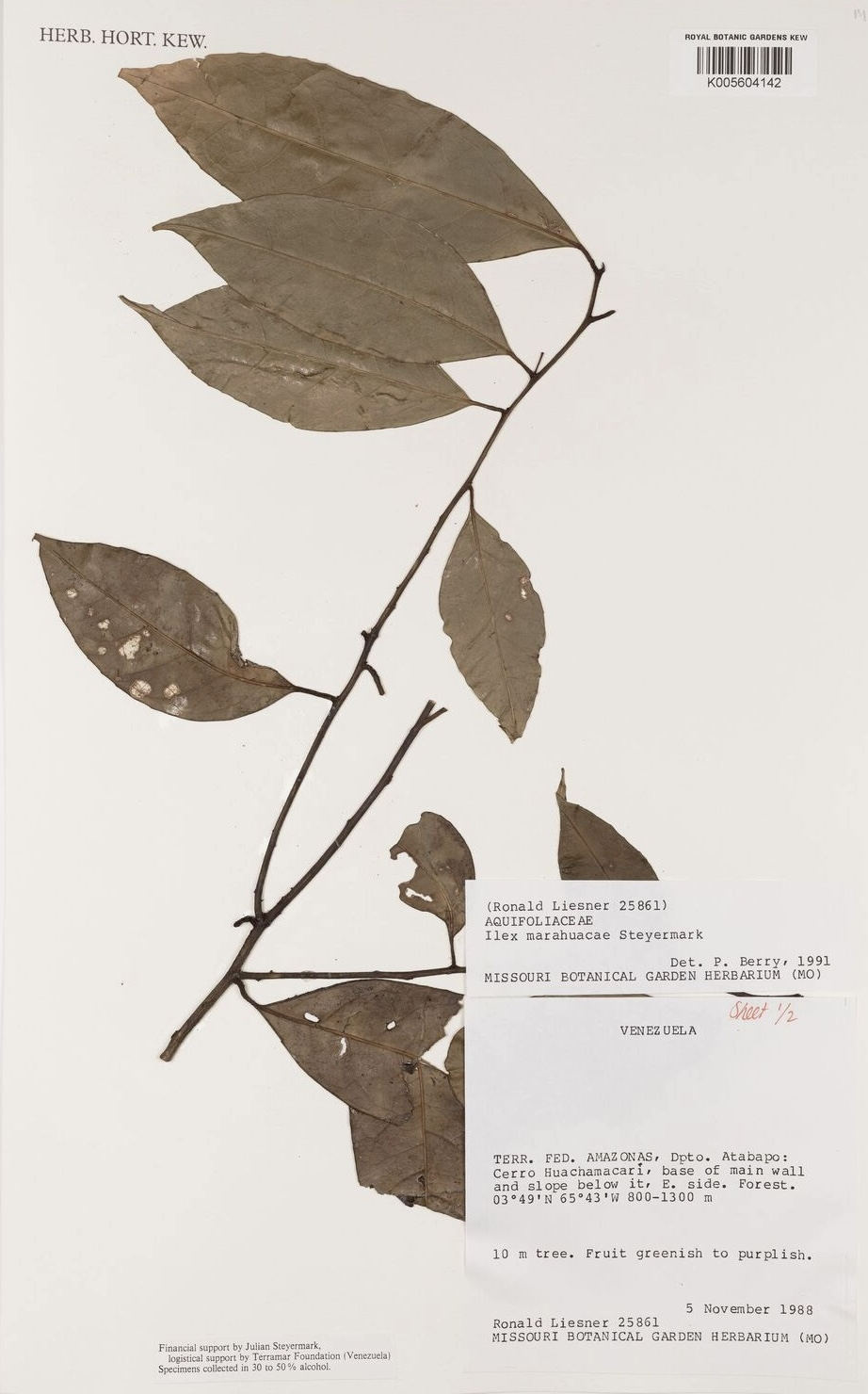

Conservation status
- Vulnerable (IUCN 3.1)

Scientific classification
- Kingdom: Plantae
- Clade: Tracheophytes
- Clade: Angiosperms
- Clade: Eudicots
- Clade: Asterids
- Order: Aquifoliales
- Family: Aquifoliaceae
- Genus: Ilex
- Species: I. marahuacae

Binomial name
- Ilex marahuacae Steyerm.

= Ilex marahuacae =

Species of holly

Ilex marahuacae is a species of tree in the family Aquifoliaceae. It is endemic to Venezuela. Specifically it lives in Duida-Marahuaca National Park, with an area of occupancy of about 8 square kilometres (3.1 sq mi), although this may be an underestimation. It is found solely on slopes in Venezuela's submontane tropical forest; at the base of tepuis; and near the tops of Marahuaca and Huachamacari. It is classified as Vulnerable by the IUCN because of likely habitat threats caused primarily by mining, although to a lesser extent by tourism; the IUCN red list predicts a habitat decline of at least 30% in 30 years.

The species was first described by Steyermark in 1988.
