= Dischidodactylus colonnelloi =

Conservation status
- Near Threatened (IUCN 3.1)

Scientific classification
- Kingdom: Animalia
- Phylum: Chordata
- Class: Amphibia
- Order: Anura
- Genus: Dischidodactylus
- Species: D. colonnelloi

Binomial name
- Dischidodactylus colonnelloi Ayarzagüena, 1985 "1983"

Species of frog

Dischidodactylus colonnelloi is a species of frog in the family Craugastoridae. It is endemic to Venezuela and only know from its type locality, Cerro Marahuaca, in the Amazonas State. The holotype was collected by G. Colonnello, hence the specific name colonnelloi.

== Description ==
Dischidodactylus colonnelloi was described based on a single specimen, the holotype, which was an adult female measuring 42.5 mm (1.67 in) in snout–vent length. The head is wider than long and rounded. The tympanum is inconspicuous. The fingers have lateral fringes but no webbing; the toes are one-third webbed. The dorsum is very dark gray, almost black, and dotted with many inconspicuous gray spots.

The female had 11 large (diameter 5 mm (0.20 in)) eggs.

== Habitat and conservation ==
Dischidodactylus colonnelloi occurs in a high montane environment on top of the tepui at an elevation of about 2,250 m (7,380 ft) above sea level. Development is presumably direct. Threats to it are unknown. It occurs in the Duida-Marahuaca National Park.

Dischidodactylus colonnelloi is only known from Cerro Marahuaca in southern Venezuela.
