= Bonnetia fasciculata =

Conservation status
- Near Threatened (IUCN 2.3)

Scientific classification
- Kingdom: Plantae
- Clade: Tracheophytes
- Clade: Angiosperms
- Clade: Eudicots
- Clade: Rosids
- Order: Malpighiales
- Family: Bonnetiaceae
- Genus: Bonnetia
- Species: B. fasciculata

Binomial name
- Bonnetia fasciculata (Maguire) P. F. Stevens & A. L. Weitzman

Species of flowering plant

Bonnetia fasciculata is a species of flowering plant in the Bonnetiaceae family. It is found only in Venezuela.
