= Loveridge =

Loveridge is a surname. Notable people with the surname include:

- Arthur Loveridge (1891–1980), British biologist
- Dave Loveridge (born 1952), New Zealand rugby player
- Emily L. Loveridge (1860–1941), American nurse, educator, school founder, and hospital superintendent
- Greg Loveridge (born 1975), New Zealand cricketer
- Ivan Loveridge Bennett (1892–1990), American physician
- John Loveridge (1925–2007), British Conservative MP
- Ronald O. Loveridge, American politician

== See also ==
- Loveridge, West Virginia, unincorporated community
- Loveridge Plantation, Leon County, Florida
- Loveridge's frog (Philoria loveridgei), a frog endemic to Australia
- Loveridge's sunbird (Cinnyris loveridgei), a bird endemic to Tanzania
- Rana De Loveridge
