= Bonnetia bolivarensis =

Conservation status
- Vulnerable (IUCN 2.3)

Scientific classification
- Kingdom: Plantae
- Clade: Tracheophytes
- Clade: Angiosperms
- Clade: Eudicots
- Clade: Rosids
- Order: Malpighiales
- Family: Bonnetiaceae
- Genus: Bonnetia
- Species: B. bolivarensis

Binomial name
- Bonnetia bolivarensis Steyerm.

Species of flowering plant

Bonnetia bolivarensis is a species of flowering plant in the Bonnetiaceae family. It is found only in Venezuela, known only from a single locality in the summit savanna of Ptari-tepui, in Canaima National Park in Bolívar.
