= Ceuthomantis duellmani =

Conservation status
- Near Threatened (IUCN 3.1)

Scientific classification
- Kingdom: Animalia
- Phylum: Chordata
- Class: Amphibia
- Order: Anura
- Family: Ceuthomantidae
- Genus: Ceuthomantis
- Species: C. duellmani

Binomial name
- Ceuthomantis duellmani Barrio-Amorós, 2010
- Ceuthomantis duellmani is only known from Cerro Sarisariñama, Venezuela

Synonyms
- Pristimantis cf. cavernibardus

Species of frog

Ceuthomantis duellmani is a species of frog in the family Ceuthomantidae. It is endemic to the Sarisariñama tepui, Bolívar state, in the southeastern Venezuela. It is named in honour of William Edward Duellman, herpetologist from the University of Kansas.

== Description ==
The type series consists of three males measuring 24–25 mm (0.94–0.98 in) in snout–vent length. Dorsal skin is areolate to tuberculate and green to brown in colour, without any apparent pattern. Some tubercles on head and body are reddish. Tympanum is distinct. Iris is yellow. Ventral surfaces are grey. Third and fourth fingers and third to fifth toes bear broad, medially notched discs that are characteristic for the genus.

Males call during the day on humid days and especially after rains. The trill call might be a synapomorphy of the genus.

== Habitat and conservation ==
Ceuthomantis duellmani occurs in montane dwarf forest that is completely covered by mosses and other epiphytes. Males call from concealed sites under the ground, or hidden inside roots and holes of trees (and are extremely difficult to locate). Its altitudinal range is at least 1,100–1,375 m (3,609–4,511 ft) asl.

Ceuthomantis duellmani is abundant on the Sarisariñama tepui. The tepui is within the Jaua-Sarisariñama National Park, and no major threats to this species have been identified. Its distribution is likely to include the neighbouring tepuis Jaua and Guanacoco.
