= Bonnetia rubicunda =

Conservation status
- Vulnerable (IUCN 2.3)

Scientific classification
- Kingdom: Plantae
- Clade: Tracheophytes
- Clade: Angiosperms
- Clade: Eudicots
- Clade: Rosids
- Order: Malpighiales
- Family: Bonnetiaceae
- Genus: Bonnetia
- Species: B. rubicunda

Binomial name
- Bonnetia rubicunda (Sastre) A.L.Weitzman & P.F.Stevens

Species of flowering plant

Bonnetia rubicunda is a species of flowering plant in the Bonnetiaceae family. It is found only in Guyana.
