= Bonnetia multinervia =

Conservation status
- Vulnerable (IUCN 3.1)

Scientific classification
- Kingdom: Plantae
- Clade: Tracheophytes
- Clade: Angiosperms
- Clade: Eudicots
- Clade: Rosids
- Order: Malpighiales
- Family: Bonnetiaceae
- Genus: Bonnetia
- Species: B. multinervia

Binomial name
- Bonnetia multinervia (Maguire) Steyermark

Species of flowering plant

Bonnetia multinervia is a species of flowering plant in the Bonnetiaceae family. It is found only in Venezuela.
