= Bonnetia holostyla =

Conservation status
- Least Concern (IUCN 3.1)

Scientific classification
- Kingdom: Plantae
- Clade: Tracheophytes
- Clade: Angiosperms
- Clade: Eudicots
- Clade: Rosids
- Order: Malpighiales
- Family: Bonnetiaceae
- Genus: Bonnetia
- Species: B. holostyla

Binomial name
- Bonnetia holostyla Huber

Species of flowering plant

Bonnetia holostyla is a species of flowering plant in the family Bonnetiaceae. It is found only in Colombia.
