= Cerro Petaca =

- Location within Venezuela

Highest point
- Elevation: 2,700 m (8,900 ft)
- Coordinates: 03°39′36″N 65°30′46″W

Geography
- Location: Amazonas, Venezuela

Cerro Petaca is a large forested ridge in Amazonas state, Venezuela. It lies just west of the two high plateaus of Cerro Marahuaca and northeast of the massive Cerro Duida. The ridge reaches a height of at least 2,700 metres (8,900 ft) above sea level. Part of the Duida–Marahuaca Massif, it is entirely within the bounds of Duida–Marahuaca National Park.

== See also ==
- Distribution of Heliamphora
