= Myersiohyla aromatica =

Conservation status
- Vulnerable (IUCN 3.1)

Scientific classification
- Kingdom: Animalia
- Phylum: Chordata
- Class: Amphibia
- Order: Anura
- Family: Hylidae
- Genus: Myersiohyla
- Species: M. aromatica

Binomial name
- Myersiohyla aromatica (Ayarzaguena & Señaris, 1993)

Species of frog

Myersiohyla aromatica is a species of frog in the family Hylidae endemic to Venezuela. Known only from one tepuy, Cerro Huachamacari, its natural habitats are classed as subtropical or tropical moist montane forests and rivers.
