= Dischidodactylus duidensis =

Conservation status
- Near Threatened (IUCN 3.1)

Scientific classification
- Kingdom: Animalia
- Phylum: Chordata
- Class: Amphibia
- Order: Anura
- Clade: Brachycephaloidea
- Genus: Dischidodactylus
- Species: D. duidensis

Binomial name
- Dischidodactylus duidensis (Rivero, 1968)

Synonyms
- Elosia duidensis Rivero, 1968

Species of amphibian

Dischidodactylus duidensis (common name: Mount Duida frog) is a species of brachycephaloid frog of uncertain family placement, sometimes placed in Craugastoridae or Ceuthomantidae. It is endemic to Venezuela and only known from its type locality, Cerro Duida. It was formally described in 1968 by Juan A. Rivero, even though the type series was collected 40 years earlier by George Henry Hamilton Tate.

Dischidodactylus duidensis is only known from Cerro Duida, Venezuela

== Description ==
The type series consists of four specimens: the holotype, a female 28 mm (1.1 in) in snout–vent length (SVL), and paratypes, a male and a female both 23 mm (0.91 in) SVL, and a juvenile 16 mm (0.63 in) SVL. Skin is roughly granular and very dark, almost black above, and greyish brown below. Snout is rounded. Tympanum is small and indistinct. Fingers are free but toes are about one-third webbed.

== Habitat and conservation ==
Dischidodactylus duidensis were collected by G. H. H. Tate from near waterfalls and streams on Cerro Duida at elevations of 990–1,220 m (3,250–4,000 ft) asl, but specific detail on its habitat were not available.

There are no known threats to this species. It occurs in the Duida–Marahuaca National Park.
