= Dischidodactylus =

Scientific classification
- Kingdom: Animalia
- Phylum: Chordata
- Class: Amphibia
- Order: Anura
- Clade: Brachycephaloidea
- Genus: Dischidodactylus; Lynch, 1979

Type species
- Elosia duidensis Rivero, 1968

Species
- 2 species (see text)

Genus of amphibians

Mount Duida frogs (Dischidodactylus) form a genus of brachycephaloid frogs endemic to the tepuis of southern Venezuela. The scientific name is derived from the Greek dischidos, meaning divided, and dactylos, meaning finger or toe, in reference to the divided ungual flap (see below).

== Taxonomy ==
The family in which Dischidodactylus should be placed is currently uncertain. Amphibian Species of the World currently places it in superfamily Brachycephaloidea with family incertae sedis, while AmphibiaWeb places it in Ceuthomantidae. It had been placed in subfamily Ceuthomantinae within family Craugastoridae based on morphology because no DNA sequence data was available. Dischidodactylus was considered closely related to Ceuthomantis because they share a synapomorphy (completely or almost completely divided ungual flaps) and both genera also have dorsal skin composed of small, flat, pliable (not keratinized) warts, and lack nuptial pads in adult males; they differ in that Dischidodactylus possess a dentigerous process of the vomer, and in that Ceuthomantis lack basal toe webbing.

== Description ==
Dischidodactylus are smallish frogs that reach a maximum snout–vent length of 43 mm (1.7 in) in females. Their head is not as wide as body. Tympanic membrane is not differentiated and tympanic annulus is visible below skin. Cranial crests are absent. Vomers have small, oblique dentigerous processes. Terminal discs are expanded, rounded, and bifurcate; circumferential groove is present and terminal phalanges are T-shaped. Dorsum is granular and venter is areolate.

== Species ==
The genus contains two species:

- Dischidodactylus colonnelloi Ayarzagüena, 1985
- Dischidodactylus duidensis (Rivero, 1968)
