= Myersiohyla =

Scientific classification
- Kingdom: Animalia
- Phylum: Chordata
- Class: Amphibia
- Order: Anura
- Family: Hylidae
- Tribe: Cophomantini
- Genus: Myersiohyla; Faivovich, Haddad, Garcia, Frost, Campbell, and Wheeler, 2005

Type species
- Hyla inparquesi Ayarzagüena and Señaris, 1994 "1993"

Diversity
- Six species (see text)

Genus of amphibians

Myersiohyla is a genus of frogs in the family Hylidae. It was erected in 2005 following a major revision of the Hylidae and initially included four species that were previously placed in the genus Hyla. The genus is found in the tepui region of Guyana and Venezuela.

== Species ==
There are six species in this genus:

- Myersiohyla aromatica (Ayarzagüena and Señaris, 1994)
- Myersiohyla chamaeleo (Faivovich, McDiarmid, and Myers, 2013)
- Myersiohyla inparquesi (Ayarzagüena and Señaris, 1994)
- Myersiohyla liliae (Kok, 2006)
- Myersiohyla loveridgei (Rivero, 1961)
- Myersiohyla neblinaria (Faivovich, McDiarmid, and Myers, 2013)
