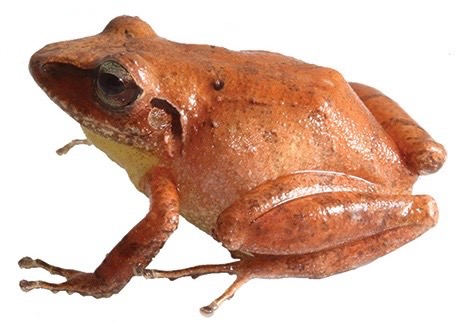

Conservation status
- Near Threatened (IUCN 3.1)

Scientific classification
- Kingdom: Animalia
- Phylum: Chordata
- Class: Amphibia
- Order: Anura
- Clade: Brachycephaloidea
- Family: Craugastoridae
- Genus: Pristimantis
- Subgenus: Pristimantis
- Species: P. savagei

Binomial name
- Pristimantis savagei (Pyburn and Lynch, 1981)

Synonyms
- Eleutherodactylus savagei Pyburn and Lynch, 1981

= Pristimantis savagei =

Species of frog

Pristimantis savagei is a species of frog in the family Strabomantidae. It is endemic to Colombia and occurs on the eastern slopes of the Cordillera Oriental in the Boyacá, Casanare, Cundinamarca, and Meta Departments, as well as in the Serranía de la Macarena (Meta Department). The specific name savagei honours Jay M. Savage, an American herpetologist. Nevertheless, common name Pyburn's robber frog has been coined for it.

== Description ==
Adult males measure 18–23 mm (0.7–0.9 in) and adult females 31–37 mm (1.2–1.5 in) in snout–vent length. The head is narrower than the body but wider than it is long. The snout is subacuminate in dorsal view and acutely rounded in lateral profile. The tympanum is prominent. The fingers have slight lateral keels and the outer ones have also broad discs. The toes have basal webbing and broad discs. The dorsum is tan to brown. There are black scapular marks and nearly black Canthal–supratympanic stripes; other patterns are vague. Dorsolateral stripes may be present. The throat has light peppering in brown. Males have a subgular vocal sac.

== Habitat and conservation ==
Pristimantis savagei occur in forests close to fast-flowing streams at elevations of 1,000–2,400 m (3,300–7,900 ft) or 600–3,000 m (2,000–9,800 ft) above sea level, depending on the source. They can be found on low vegetation (up to half a meter above the ground) and also occur in secondary forest. The eggs are laid in leaf litter and have direct development (i.e., there is no free-living larval stage).

Pristimantis savagei is common in suitable habitat. It is an adaptable species that is probably not facing significant threats, although habitat loss caused by agriculture (crops and cattle ranching) is likely to occur in the future. It has been found in areas where Batrachochytrium dendrobatidis is present, but so far this species has tested negative. It is present in the Serranía de la Macarena.
