= Ceuthomantis cavernibardus =

Conservation status
- Data Deficient (IUCN 3.1)

Scientific classification
- Kingdom: Animalia
- Phylum: Chordata
- Class: Amphibia
- Order: Anura
- Family: Ceuthomantidae
- Genus: Ceuthomantis
- Species: C. cavernibardus

Binomial name
- Ceuthomantis cavernibardus (Myers and Donnelly, 1997)

Synonyms
- Eleutherodactylus cavernibardus Myers and Donnelly, 1997; Pristimantis cavernibardus (Myers and Donnelly, 1997)

Species of frog

Ceuthomantis cavernibardus is a species of frog in the family Craugastoridae. It is found in the Sierra Tapirapecó in the Amazonas state of Venezuela as well as in the adjacent Amazonas state of Brazil (where the range is known as Serra do Tapirapecó). The specific name cavernibardus is derived from the Latin caverna for "cave" and bardus for "singer". It refers to the caves commonly used by calling males.

== Description ==
Adult males measure 27–31 mm (1.1–1.2 in) and females 30–32 mm (1.2–1.3 in) in snout–vent length. The head as wide as the body and slightly longer than it is wide. The snout is rounded to truncate in dorsal view and rounded in lateral view. The tympanum is round to vertically oblong. The fingers and toes have terminal discs but no webbing. Skin on the dorsum and the flanks is granular and weakly tubercular. Dorsal coloration is variable but usually including green, and usually with a dark, vague X-like pattern. Some individuals are uniformly green, greenish black with bright green streaks and flecks, or brown to olive brown. The lower surfaces are blackish gray.

== Habitat and conservation ==
The species' natural habitats are montane forests at elevations of 930–1,200 m (3,050–3,940 ft) above sea level. Individuals have been found in small caves under granite boulders, in the roots of aroids on the tops of boulders, perched on leaves some 1 metre above the ground, and on the ground in forest bordering a river. Based on calling males, it seems to be one of the most common frogs in its type locality. No major threats to it are known. It occurs in the Parima Tapirapecó National Park, Venezuela.

Records of Ceuthomantis cavernibardus near the border between Venezuela and Brazil.
