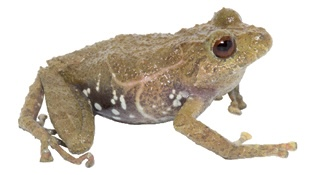

Conservation status
- Near Threatened (IUCN 3.1)

Scientific classification
- Kingdom: Animalia
- Phylum: Chordata
- Class: Amphibia
- Order: Anura
- Clade: Brachycephaloidea
- Family: Craugastoridae
- Genus: Pristimantis
- Species: P. muscosus

Binomial name
- Pristimantis muscosus (Duellman & Pramuk, 1999)

Synonyms
- Eleutherodactylus muscosus Duellman & Pramuk, 1999

= Pristimantis muscosus =

Species of frog

Pristimantis muscosus is a species of frog in the family Strabomantidae. It is only found on the Cordillera del Condor of southern Ecuador and northern Peru.

Its natural habitats are humid, upper montane forests. The Peruvian population occurred on rocky banks of a stream. It is potentially threatened by habitat loss.
