= Leptodactylus turimiquensis =

Conservation status
- Near Threatened (IUCN 3.1)

Scientific classification
- Kingdom: Animalia
- Phylum: Chordata
- Class: Amphibia
- Order: Anura
- Family: Leptodactylidae
- Genus: Leptodactylus
- Species: L. turimiquensis

Binomial name
- Leptodactylus turimiquensis Heyer, 2005

Species of frog

Leptodactylus turimiquensis, the calf frog, is a species of frog in the family Leptodactylidae. It is endemic to Venezuela.

== Habitat ==
This frog is found near the roots of primary and secondary vegetation. It is active at night and hides in burrows during the day. Because it is sometimes found in disturbed habitats, such as gardens, scientists believe it might have some tolerance to anthropogenic disturbance. Scientists have seen it between 50 and 600 meters above sea level.

This frog has been reported in protected areas, including Península de Paria National Park, Turuépano National Park, Mochima National Park, and Turimiquire Massif protected area.

== Reproduction ==
The female frog digs a depression in the ground for the foam nest, in which she deposits her. After the eggs hatch, the free-living tadpoles are washed into nearby bodies of water.

== Threats ==
The IUCN classifies this species as near threatened. It is subject to some habitat loss in the form of deforestation, even in parts of Peninsual de Paria National Park. People cut down forests to build farms for tannia, taro, cocoa, and coffee. Some of these frogs are also in danger from oil drilling.

== Original description ==
- Heyer WR (2005). "Variation and taxonomic clarification of the large species of the Leptodactylus pentadactylus species group (Amphibia: Leptodactylidae) from Middle America, Northern South America, and Amazonia". Arquivos de Zoologia (Full text). 37 (3): 269–348. doi:10.11606/issn.2176-7793.v37i3p269-348.
