= Pristimantis thymelensis =

Conservation status
- Near Threatened (IUCN 3.1)

Scientific classification
- Kingdom: Animalia
- Phylum: Chordata
- Class: Amphibia
- Order: Anura
- Clade: Brachycephaloidea
- Family: Craugastoridae
- Genus: Pristimantis
- Species: P. thymelensis

Binomial name
- Pristimantis thymelensis (Lynch, 1972)

Synonyms
- Eleutherodactylus thymelensis Lynch, 1972

Species of frog

Pristimantis thymelensis is a species of frog in the family Strabomantidae. It is found in Colombia and Ecuador. Its natural habitats are tropical moist shrubland and high-altitude grassland.
