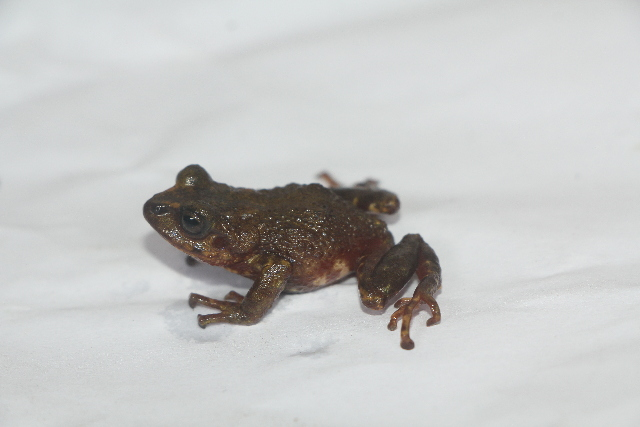

Conservation status
- Near Threatened (IUCN 3.1)

Scientific classification
- Kingdom: Animalia
- Phylum: Chordata
- Class: Amphibia
- Order: Anura
- Family: Strabomantidae
- Genus: Pristimantis
- Subgenus: Pristimantis
- Species: P. simoterus

Binomial name
- Pristimantis simoterus (Lynch, 1980)

Synonyms
- Eleutherodactylus simoterus Lynch, 1980

= Pristimantis simoterus =

Species of frog

Pristimantis simoterus is a species of frog in the family Strabomantidae. It is endemic to Colombia and known from the Cordillera Central in the Caldas, Risaralda, Quindío, and Tolima Departments. Common name Albania robber frog has been coined for it. The specific name simoterus is derived from Greek simos meaning "snub-nosed", in reference to the short snout of this species.

== Description ==
Adult males measure 26–33 mm (1.0–1.3 in) and adult females 31–39 mm (1.2–1.5 in) in snout–vent length. The snout is short and rounded. The tympanum is distinct. Skin of the dorsum has large flat warts; those on the flanks are smaller. The fingers and toes bear discs, and the toes have also prominent lateral fringes. The dorsum is lime-green, golden-brown, reddish-brown, gray, or nearly black. There are few brown or black markings. Males have yellow chin and reddish vocal sac, whereas females have rufous brown throat and venter. The iris is deep copper and has black flecks and a reddish horizontal streak.

The male advertisement call is a soft whistle that is usually repeated.

== Habitat and conservation ==
Pristimantis simoterus occurs in páramo and subpáramo vegetation and in cloud forests at elevations of 2,672–4,350 m (8,766–14,272 ft) above sea level. It can also be found in pastureland, although this is a marginal habitat for the species. It is active at night when males are calling on the ground among grasses and low bushes. During the day it is found on graminaceous vegetation or under logs and rocks. It remains active at near-freezing temperatures.

This species suffers from habitat loss caused by smallholder livestock grazing and cultivation of crops. However, it is a common and adaptable species. It occurs in the Los Nevados National Natural Park where it is very abundant.
