= Myersiohyla chamaeleo =

Scientific classification
- Kingdom: Animalia
- Phylum: Chordata
- Class: Amphibia
- Order: Anura
- Family: Hylidae
- Genus: Myersiohyla
- Species: M. chamaeleo

Binomial name
- Myersiohyla chamaeleo (Faivovich, McDiarmid, and Myers, 2013)

Synonyms
- Myersiohyla chamaeleo Faivovich, McDiarmid, and Myers, 2013

Species of frog

Myersiohyla chamaeleo is a species of frog from the family Hylidae. It lives in Amazonas, Venezuela. Scientists have seen it on the Tepui Cerro de la Neblina between 1450 and 2100 meters above sea level.

== Description ==
Adult males measure 44.6–49.6 mm in length while females are 46.0–56.9 mm. The species has a unique ability to change color, which is how it got its name "chamaeleo" (similar to chameleon). The frog can change from reddish brown at night to light green during the day.

The frog has stellate (star-shaped) melanophores (color cells) over its ground color, giving it a distinctive appearance. The flanks are yellowish in living specimens, and the iris is black with an intricate metallic copper pattern.

== Habitat and behavior ==
M. chamaeleo lives in highland habitats of Cerro de la Neblina including open savannas and streams. During the day, frogs hide in the leaf axils of plants like Bonnetia maguireorum and large terrestrial bromeliads (Brocchinia tatei). At night, they are found on vegetation and rocks along streams or in surrounding forest.

== Reproduction ==
Males call from vegetation or mossy rock faces, usually 0.1 to 2.5 meters above water. The advertisement call consists of short notes given at about 1–2 notes per second at temperatures of 14–17°C. Females lay large, unpigmented eggs measuring 2.9–3.1 mm in diameter.

== Tadpoles ==
The tadpoles live in streams and can reach up to 80 mm in total length. They have a globular body shape with a labial tooth row formula of 4/7 to 6/11. Tadpoles vary in color from nearly black to brown or bicolored, with darker specimens typically found in open, exposed streams and paler ones in shaded habitats.

== Discovery ==
The species was described in 2013 based on specimens collected during the Cerro de la Neblina Expedition of 1984–1985. The expedition was organized by the Fundación para el Desarrollo de las Ciencias Físicas, Matemáticas y Naturales (FUDECI) in Venezuela. The holotype (main reference specimen) was collected on February 7, 1984.
