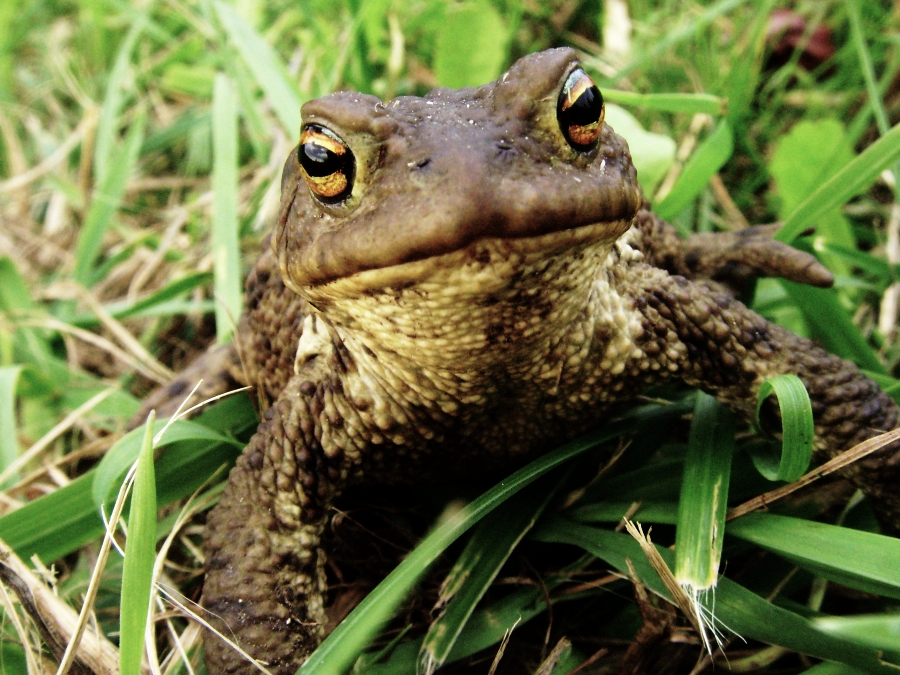

Conservation status
- Near Threatened (IUCN 3.1)

Scientific classification
- Kingdom: Animalia
- Phylum: Chordata
- Class: Amphibia
- Order: Anura
- Family: Bufonidae
- Genus: Metaphryniscus; Señaris, Ayarzagüena, and Gorzula, 1994
- Species: M. sosai

Binomial name
- Metaphryniscus sosai Señaris, Ayarzagüena, and Gorzula, 1994

Synonyms
- Metaphryniscus sosae Senaris, Ayarzagüena, and Gorzula, 1994

= Metaphryniscus =

Genus of amphibians

Metaphryniscus is a monotypic genus of toads in the family Bufonidae. The sole species is Metaphryniscus sosae. The species, and thereby the whole genus, is endemic to Venezuela and only known from its type locality, Cerro Marahuaca. Its natural habitat is subtropical or tropical moist montane forests.
