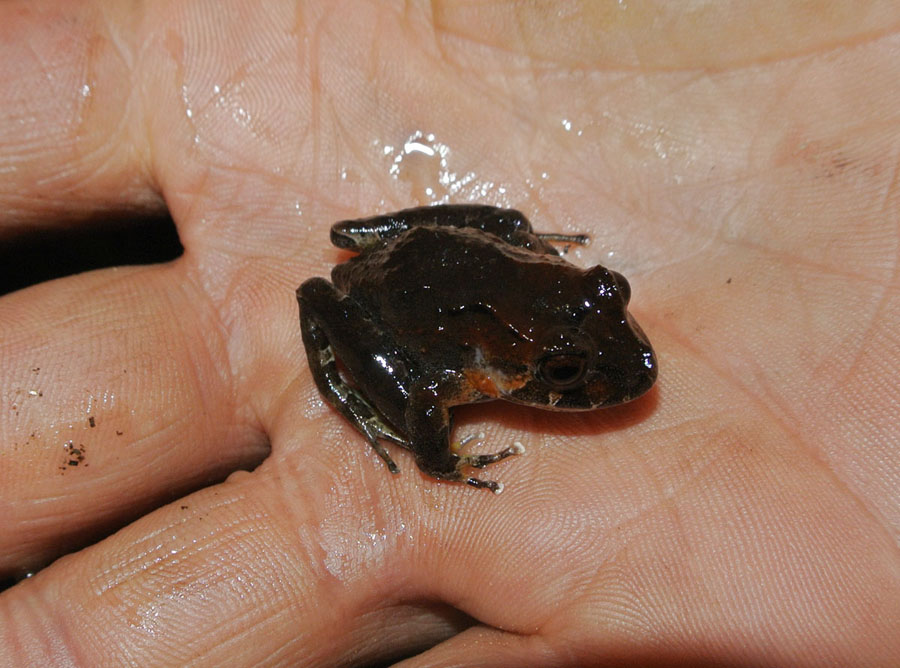

Conservation status
- Near Threatened (IUCN 3.1)

Scientific classification
- Kingdom: Animalia
- Phylum: Chordata
- Class: Amphibia
- Order: Anura
- Clade: Brachycephaloidea
- Family: Craugastoridae
- Genus: Tachiramantis
- Species: T. tayrona

Binomial name
- Tachiramantis tayrona (Lynch & Ruíz-Carranza, 1985)

Synonyms
- Eleutherodactylus tayrona Lynch & Ruíz-Carranza, 1985; Pristimantis tayrona (Lynch & Ruíz-Carranza, 1985)

= Tachiramantis tayrona =

Species of frog

Tachiramantis tayrona is a species of frog in the family Strabomantidae. It is endemic to the north-western Sierra Nevada de Santa Marta, Colombia. The specific name tayrona refers to the pre-Columbian Tairona culture. Lynch and Ruíz-Carranza suggest that this species might have been a model for the gold frogs unearthed from archaeological sites in the area.

== Description ==
Males measure 15–25 mm (0.59–0.98 in) and females 23–30 mm (0.91–1.18 in) in snout–vent length. The head is narrower than the body, and the tip of snout is pointed. The tympanum is distinct. The skin of the dorsum is smooth to shagreened, with many small, short ridges. Colouration is reddish-brown above, with slightly darker flanks. The face is dark brown, and the vocal sac is dirty yellow. The venter is pale yellow bronze washed with grey. The iris is reddish-brown above and grey below. When present, the vertebral stripe is dull cream to dull orange. All fingers have expanded pads at the tips of digits, those on the toes are similarly expanded or smaller.

== Habitat and conservation ==
Tachiramantis tayrona inhabits cloud forests and páramos at elevations of 1,300–2,700 m (4,300–8,900 ft) above sea level. It occurs in and on arboreal bromeliads, which also are its breeding habitat. It shares this habitat with Savage's salamander Bolitoglossa savagei.

It is threatened by habitat loss caused by cultivation and fumigation of crops and rearing of livestock. Part of the range is protected in the Sierra Nevada de Santa Marta National Park.
