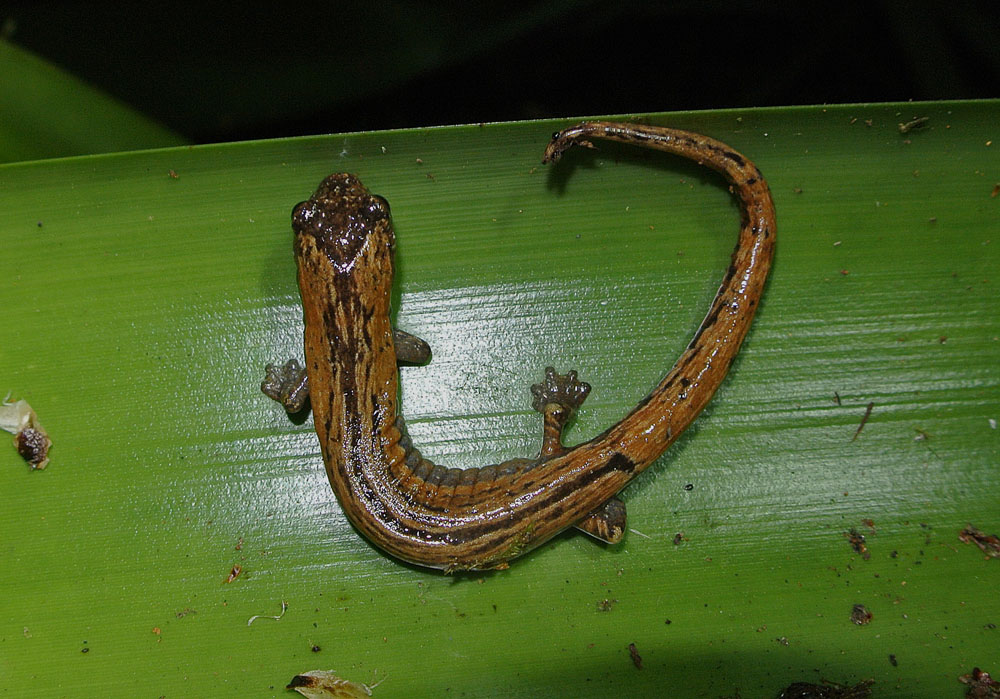

Conservation status
- Near Threatened (IUCN 3.1)

Scientific classification
- Kingdom: Animalia
- Phylum: Chordata
- Class: Amphibia
- Order: Urodela
- Family: Plethodontidae
- Genus: Bolitoglossa
- Species: B. savagei

Binomial name
- Bolitoglossa savagei Brame and Wake, 1963

= Savage's salamander =

Species of amphibian

Savage's salamander (Bolitoglossa savagei), also known as Savage's mushroomtongue salamander, is a species of salamander in the family Plethodontidae. It is endemic to the Sierra Nevada de Santa Marta in northern Colombia (Magdalena Department). The record from Venezuela represents another species, likely Bolitoglossa guaramacalensis. The species is named after Jay M. Savage, an American herpetologist.

== Description ==
Males measure 36–52 mm (1.4–2.0 in) and females 38–55 mm (1.5–2.2 in) in snout–vent length. The tail is slightly shorter or longer than the body. The hands and feet are partially to nearly fully webbed. Colouration is variable, dorsally light or dark brown, with a clear longitudinal band, mottling, or simply uniform.

== Habitat and conservation ==
Bolitoglossa savagei is found in montane forests at elevations of 1,000–2,140 m (3,280–7,020 ft) above sea level. It primarily lives (and breeds) in arboreal bromeliads, but may sometimes occur in decaying logs and stumps or under decaying leaves. It may co-occur in bromeliads with the frog Pristimantis tayrona.

Habitat loss from deforestation is a threat to this species.
