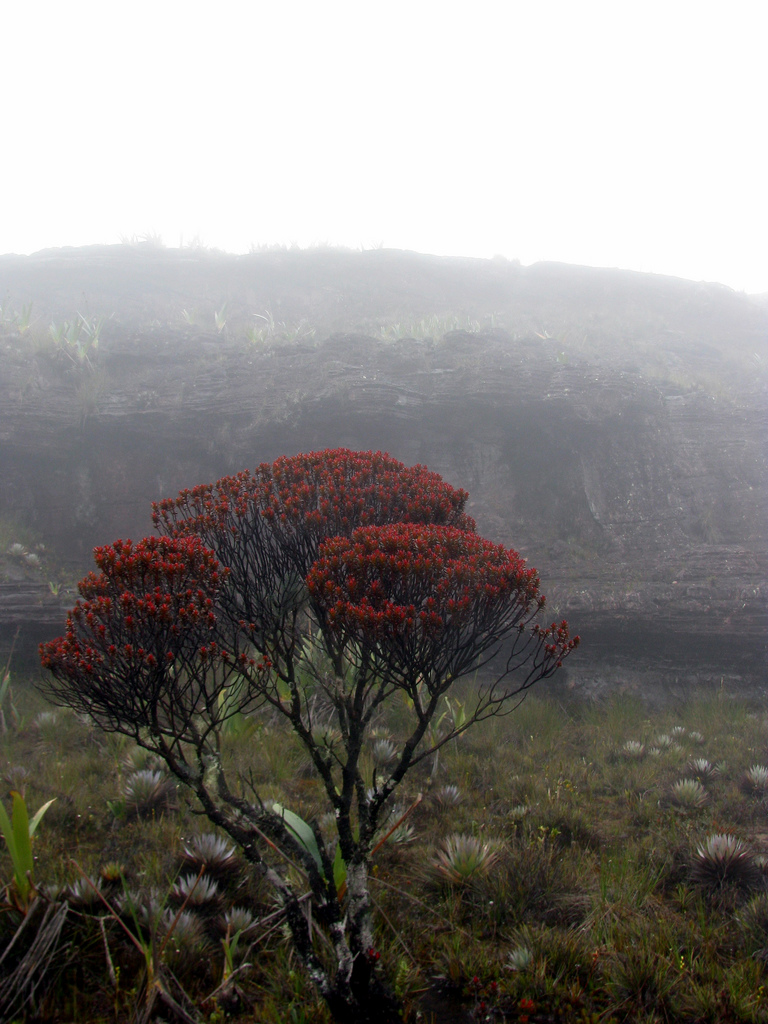
- Bonnetia roraimae, habitus
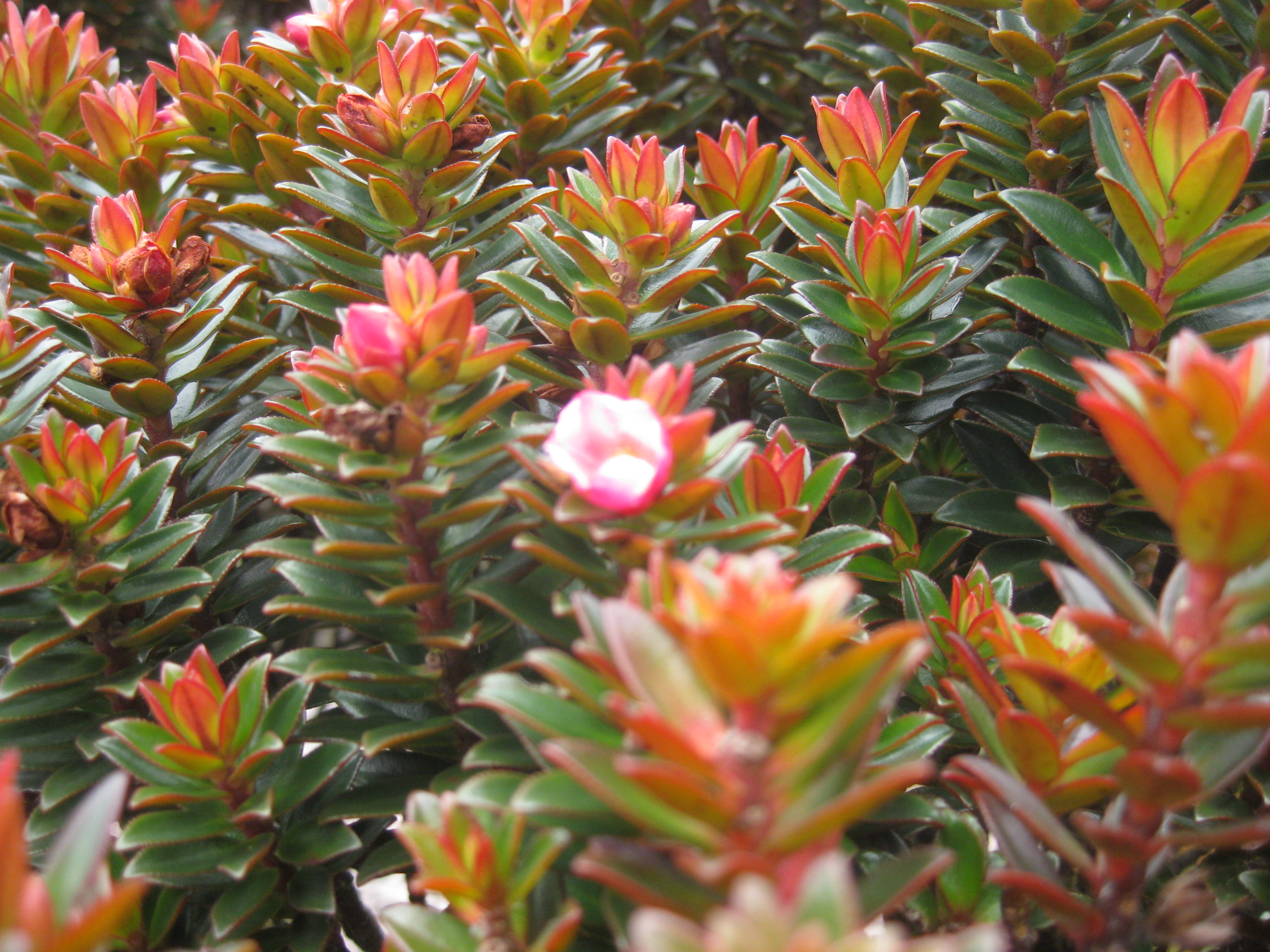
- B. roraimae, close-up

Scientific classification
- Kingdom: Plantae
- Clade: Tracheophytes
- Clade: Angiosperms
- Clade: Eudicots
- Clade: Rosids
- Order: Malpighiales
- Family: Bonnetiaceae
- Genus: Bonnetia; Mart. in Mart. & Zucc.

Synonyms
- Neblinaria Maguire; Neogleasonia Maguire; Acopanea Steyerm.

= Bonnetia =

Genus of flowering plants

Bonnetia is a genus of flowering plants in the family Bonnetiaceae. Most of the roughly 30 species are shrubs. The remaining species, all trees, are among the dominant species in the forest vegetation on the tepui plateaus of northern South America, such as B. roraimae on the summit of Mount Roraima.

== Species ==
Bonnetia contains the following species:

- Bonnetia ahogadoi (Steyerm.) A.L.Weitzman & P.F.Stevens
- Bonnetia anceps Mart. & Zucc.
- Bonnetia bahiensis Turcz.
- Bonnetia bolivarensis Steyerm.
- Bonnetia celiae Maguire
- Bonnetia chimantensis Steyerm.
- Bonnetia cordifolia Maguire
- Bonnetia crassa Gleason
- Bonnetia cubensis (Britton) Howard
- Bonnetia euryanthera Steyerm.
- Bonnetia fasciculata P.F.Stevens & A.L.Weitzman
- Bonnetia holostyla Huber
- Bonnetia huberiana Steyerm.
- Bonnetia jauaensis Maguire
- Bonnetia kathleenae Lasser
- Bonnetia katleeniae Lasser
- Bonnetia lanceifolia Kobuski
- Bonnetia liesneri Steyerm.
- Bonnetia maguireorum Steyerm.
- Bonnetia multinervia (Maguire) Steyerm.
- Bonnetia neblinae Maguire
- Bonnetia paniculata Spruce ex Benth.
- Bonnetia ptariensis Steyerm.
- Bonnetia roraimae Oliveri
- Bonnetia roseiflora Maguire
- Bonnetia rubicunda (Sastre) A.L.Weitzman & P.F.Stevens
- Bonnetia sessilis Benth.
- Bonnetia steyermarkii Kobuski
- Bonnetia stricta Mart.
- Bonnetia tepuiensis Kobuski & Steyerm.
- Bonnetia tristyla Gleason
- Bonnetia venulosa Mart. & Zucc.
- Bonnetia wurdackii Maguire
