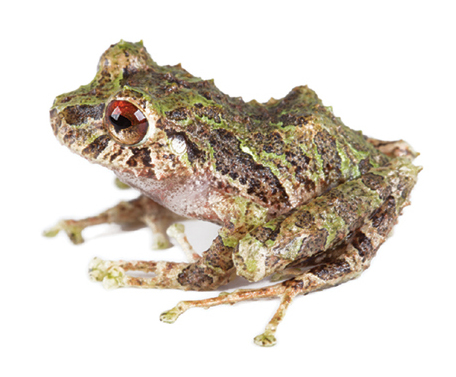

Conservation status
- Near Threatened (IUCN 3.1)

Scientific classification
- Kingdom: Animalia
- Phylum: Chordata
- Class: Amphibia
- Order: Anura
- Family: Strabomantidae
- Genus: Pristimantis
- Species: P. crucifer

Binomial name
- Pristimantis crucifer (Boulenger, 1899)

Synonyms
- Eleutherodactylus crucifer (Boulenger, 1899)

= Pristimantis crucifer =

Species of frog

Pristimantis crucifer is a species of frog in the family Strabomantidae. It is endemic to Ecuador. Its natural habitats are tropical moist montane forests and rivers. It is threatened by habitat loss.
