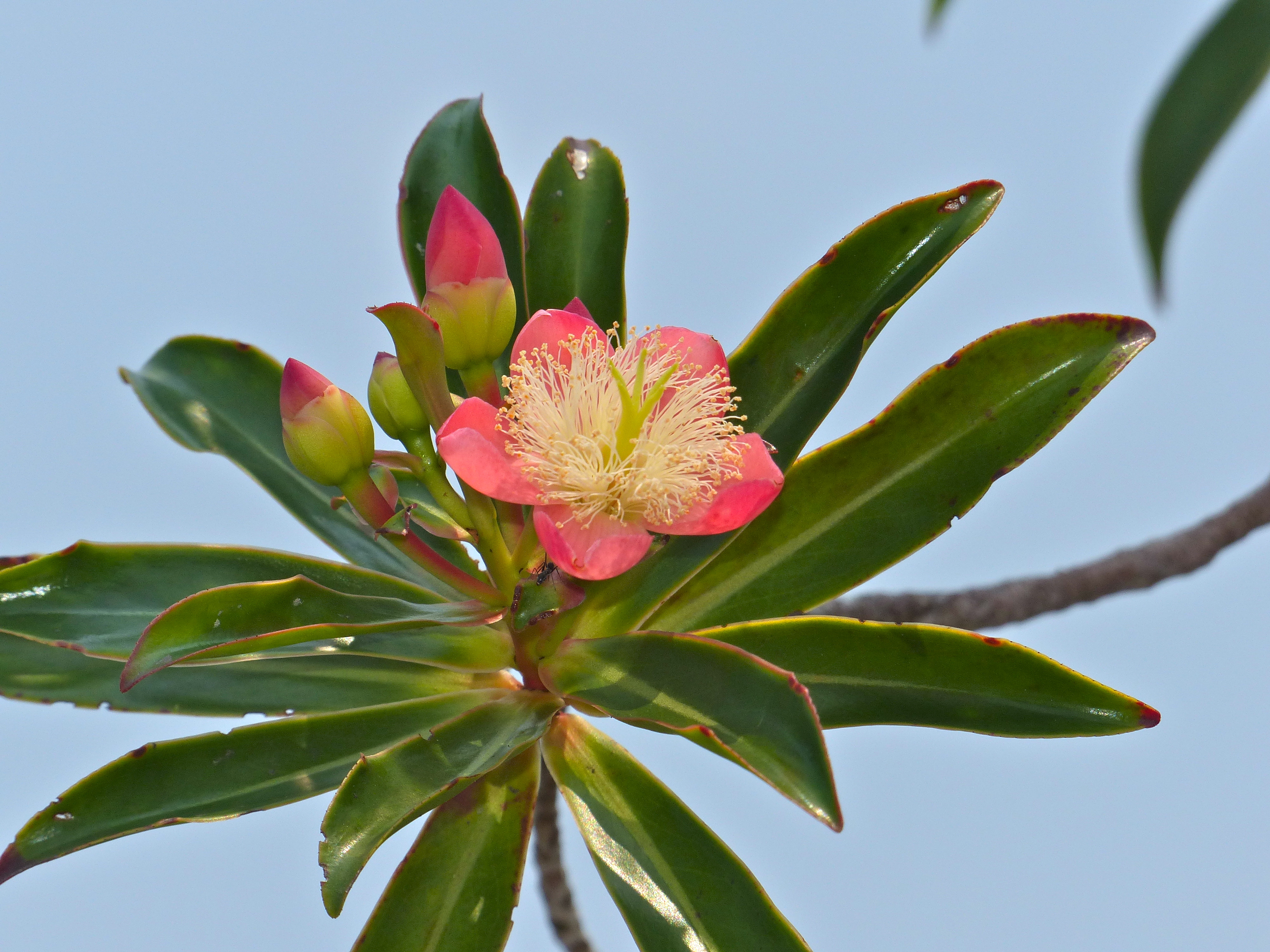
- Ploiarium elegans

Scientific classification
- Kingdom: Plantae
- Clade: Tracheophytes
- Clade: Angiosperms
- Clade: Eudicots
- Clade: Rosids
- Order: Malpighiales
- Family: Bonnetiaceae
- Genus: Ploiarium; Korth. 1841

Type species
- Ploiarium elegans

Species
- Ploiarium elegans; Ploiarium pulcherrimum; Ploiarium sessile

= Ploiarium =

Genus of woody plants

Ploiarium is a genus of three species of woody plants in the family Bonnetiaceae. It is native to tropical forests and peat swamp forests in Southeast Asia including southern Indochina, Malay Peninsula, Sumatra, and Borneo. Species are generally slow growing with irregular flowering and fruiting cycles. Colonization of plants by arbuscular mycorrhizal fungi is known to improve growth and biomass.

== Chemistry ==
Species of Ploiarium are used in medicine as they contain compounds that possess antimicrobial activity. Several xanthones have been discovered in the stems and bark of P. elegans including: ploiarixanthone, euxanmodin A, and euxanmodin B. The anthraquinones emodin, ploiariquinone A, and 1,8-dihydroxy-3-methoxy-6- methyl-anthraquinone have also been reported from the genus. Triterpenoid benzoates are also reported from the bark of P. elegans. Leaf extracts contain a diverse array of terpenoids, alkaloids, polyphenols, flavonoids, steroids, and saponins and have been studied for their anti-bacterial properties, particularly against Propionibacterium, responsible for skin acne.
