= Guaramacal salamander =

Conservation status
- Endangered (IUCN 3.1)

Scientific classification
- Kingdom: Animalia
- Phylum: Chordata
- Class: Amphibia
- Order: Urodela
- Family: Plethodontidae
- Genus: Bolitoglossa
- Species: B. guaramacalensis

Binomial name
- Bolitoglossa guaramacalensis Schargel, García-Pérez, and Smith, 2002

Species of amphibian

The Guaramacal salamander (Bolitoglossa guaramacalensis), also known as the holy-mountain salamander, is a species of salamander in the family Plethodontidae. It is endemic to the Cordillera de Mérida, Venezuela. The Venezuelan specimen first reported as Bolitoglossa savagei likely represents this species. The species is named after its type locality, Guaramacal in the Trujillo.

== Description ==
Based on the type series consisting of two females and one male, adult males measure 48 mm (1.9 in) and females 60–69 mm (2.4–2.7 in) in snout–vent length. The tail is slightly shorter or longer than the body. The hands and feet are moderately webbed. The dorsum is heavily pigmented, with paler reddish orange or pale yellow blotches or longitudinal streaks.

== Habitat and conservation ==
The species' natural habitat are cloud forests at elevations of 1,800–2,400 m (5,900–7,900 ft) above sea level. It is a terrestrial species found on rocks, or more rarely, in bromeliads. It is a common species but with small range, making it susceptible stochastic threats.
