= Myersiohyla neblinaria =

Conservation status
- Least Concern (IUCN 3.1)

Scientific classification
- Kingdom: Animalia
- Phylum: Chordata
- Class: Amphibia
- Order: Anura
- Family: Hylidae
- Genus: Myersiohyla
- Species: M. neblinaria

Binomial name
- Myersiohyla neblinaria Faivovich, McDiarmid, and Myers, 2013

Species of frog

Myersiohyla neblinaria, the neblina tree frog, is a frog in the family Hylidae, endemic to Venezuela and possibly Brazil. Scientists have seen it between 1250 and 2100 meters above sea level.

The Myersiohyla neblinaria is a sturdy tree frog of medium size. Males typically measure between 47.7 and 52.3 mm from snout to vent, while females range from 54.0 to 61.6 mm. It possesses a relatively large head that is slightly longer than its width, comprising approximately one-third of its overall body length. When viewed from the top, the snout appears rounded, while from the side, it appears truncated, featuring a curved upper part and a concave area between the eyes.

== Original description ==
- Julián Faivovich; Roy W Mcdiarmid; Charles W. Myers (2013). "Two new species of Myersiohyla (Anura: Hylidae) from Cerro de la Neblina, Venezuela, with comments on other species of the genus". American Museum Novitates (Abstract) (3792): 1–62. doi:10.1206/3792.1. S2CID 85744264.
