= Archytaea =

Scientific classification
- Kingdom: Plantae
- Clade: Tracheophytes
- Clade: Angiosperms
- Clade: Eudicots
- Clade: Rosids
- Order: Malpighiales
- Family: Bonnetiaceae
- Genus: Archytaea; Mart.

Genus of flowering plants

Archytaea is a genus of flowering plants belonging to the family Bonnetiaceae.

Its native range is Southern Tropical America.

Species:

- Archytaea angustifolia Maguire
- Archytaea triflora Mart.
