= Myersiohyla liliae =

Conservation status
- Endangered (IUCN 3.1)

Scientific classification
- Kingdom: Animalia
- Phylum: Chordata
- Class: Amphibia
- Order: Anura
- Family: Hylidae
- Genus: Myersiohyla
- Species: M. liliae

Binomial name
- Myersiohyla liliae (Kok, 2006)

Synonyms
- Hypsiboas liliae Kok, 2006; Boana liliae — Dubois, 2017

Species of amphibian

Myersiohyla liliae is a species of frogs in the family Hylidae. It is endemic to the Pacaraima Mountains in Guyana and known from the region of its type locality in the Kaieteur National Park and from Imbaimadai. The species is dedicated to the daughter of its describer, Lili Kok.

== Description ==
Adult males measure 33–37 mm (1.3–1.5 in) in snout–vent length. The body and limbs are slender. The head is wider than the body and slightly wider than it is long. The snout is truncate in dorsal view and slightly protruding in lateral view. The tympanum is distinct and relatively large, only slightly obscured by the well-developed supratympanic fold. The fingers and toes bear terminal discs and are partly webbed. Skin is granular. The colour pattern is variable and also depends on light intensity, ranging from vivid green to yellowish green in daytime to greenish brown at night. The throat and the venter are blue. Males have a single subgular vocal sac.

The male advertisement call is of a long series of loud percussive notes ("tuk tuk tuk tuk ..."), gradually increasing in speed and volume, and repeated up to seven times per second. The call is audible over long distances and is often preceded by a groan or several isolated notes.

== Habitat and conservation ==
Myersiohyla liliae occurs in primary forest and its edge with savanna, near large bromeliads. Its altitudinal range is 400–550 m (1,310–1,800 ft) above sea level. Individuals call from terrestrial bromeliads, and perhaps also from arboreal bromeliads.

Myersiohyla liliae is a rare species. It is threatened by gold and diamond mining, also occurring within the Kaieteur National Park.
