= Pristimantis fetosus =

Conservation status
- Near Threatened (IUCN 3.1)

Scientific classification
- Kingdom: Animalia
- Phylum: Chordata
- Class: Amphibia
- Order: Anura
- Clade: Brachycephaloidea
- Family: Craugastoridae
- Genus: Pristimantis
- Species: P. fetosus

Binomial name
- Pristimantis fetosus (Lynch & Rueda-Almonacid, 1998)

Synonyms
- Eleutherodactylus fetosus Lynch & Rueda-Almonacid, 1998

Species of frog

Pristimantis fetosus is a species of frog from the family Strabomantidae. It is endemic to Colombia. Its natural habitats are tropical moist montane forests and rivers. It is threatened by habitat loss.
