= Jingophrys feii =

Conservation status
- Near Threatened (IUCN 3.1)

Scientific classification
- Kingdom: Animalia
- Phylum: Chordata
- Class: Amphibia
- Order: Anura
- Family: Megophryidae
- Subfamily: Megophryinae
- Genus: Jingophrys
- Species: J. feii

Binomial name
- Jingophrys feii (Yang, Wang, & Wang, 2018)

Synonyms
- Megophrys feii Yang, Wang, & Wang, 2018

Species of frog in the family Megophryidae

Jingophrys feii, commonly known as Fei's horned toad or Fei's horned frog, is a species of frog in the family Megophryidae. It was discovered by the Kadoorie Conservation China Department (KCC) during an ecological survey, alongside three other species of frog. It has been declared near threatened by the IUCN Redlist.

== Description ==
Megophrys feii are identified by their small, slender body, protruding snout, the hornlike extensions on their eyelids, and their distinct, round tympanum. Females are slightly larger than males, and their heads are as wide as their bodies. The species is brown, with black and white tubercules along the back and legs.

== Distribution ==
The frogs are found in Yingjiang County, Yunnan Province, China, within several miles of the Tongbiguan Provincial Nature Reserve, and the Kachin State of Myanmar. It lives in the area's well-preserved mountain forests, at elevations of 700 to 1200 meters. Its habitat is described as an inland wetland forest.
