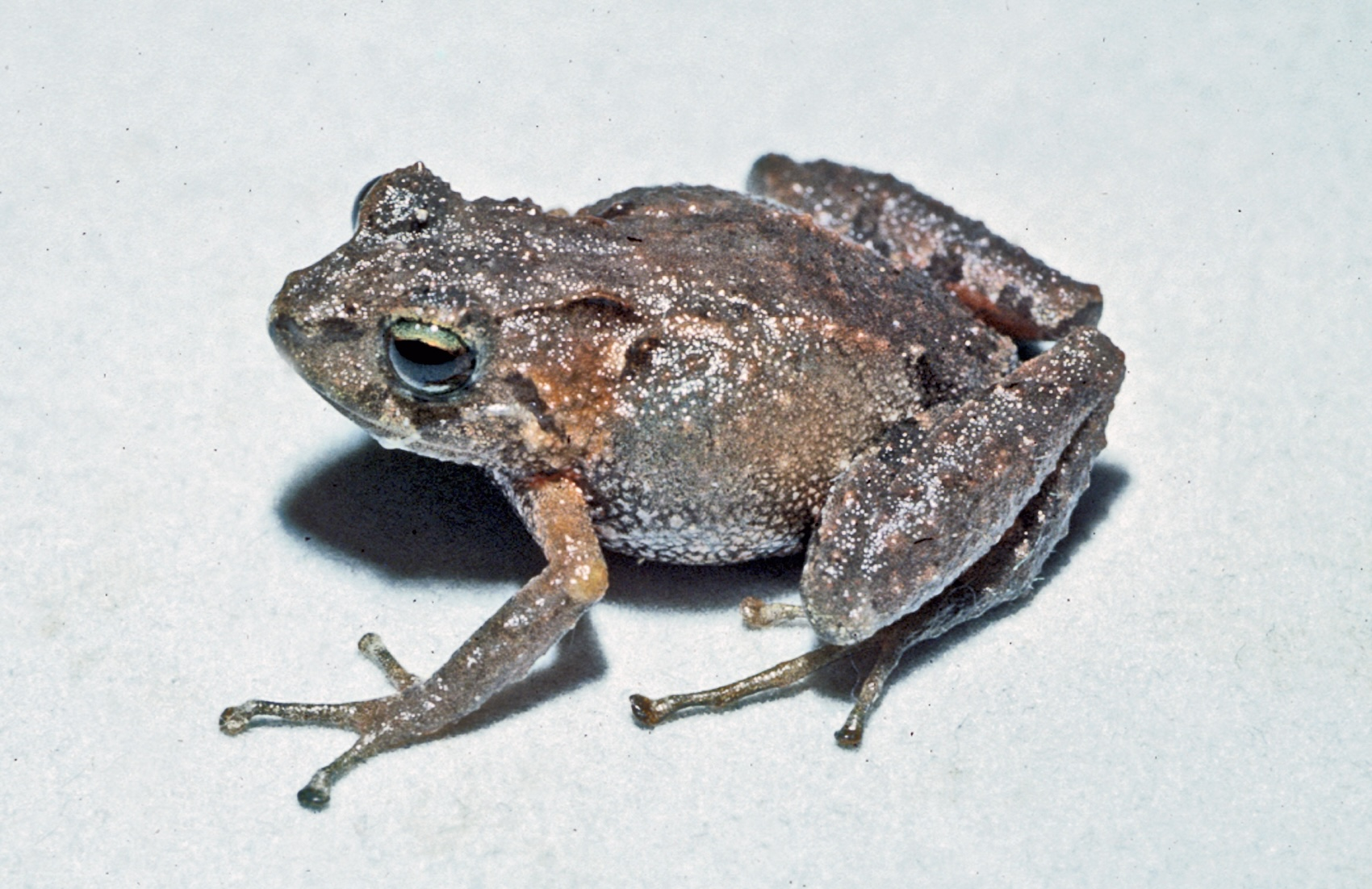

Conservation status
- Near Threatened (IUCN 3.1)

Scientific classification
- Kingdom: Animalia
- Phylum: Chordata
- Class: Amphibia
- Order: Anura
- Clade: Brachycephaloidea
- Family: Craugastoridae
- Genus: Pristimantis
- Species: P. leoni

Binomial name
- Pristimantis leoni (Lynch, 1976)

Synonyms
- Eleutherodactylus leoni Lynch, 1976

= Pristimantis leoni =

Species of amphibian

Pristimantis leoni is an endangered species of frog in the family Strabomantidae. It is found in Colombia and Ecuador. Its natural habitats are tropical moist montane forests, high-altitude shrubland, high-altitude grassland, rural gardens, and heavily degraded former forest.
