= Pristimantis nephophilus =

Conservation status
- Near Threatened (IUCN 3.1)

Scientific classification
- Kingdom: Animalia
- Phylum: Chordata
- Class: Amphibia
- Order: Anura
- Clade: Brachycephaloidea
- Family: Craugastoridae
- Genus: Pristimantis
- Species: P. nephophilus

Binomial name
- Pristimantis nephophilus (Duellman & Pramuk, 1999)

Synonyms
- Eleutherodactylus nephophilus Duellman & Pramuk, 1999

Species of frog

Pristimantis nephophilus is a species of frog in the family Strabomantidae. It is found in the San Martin Region of northern Peru and adjacent Zamora-Chinchipe Province of southern Ecuador. Its natural habitat are montane and cloud forests. It is threatened by habitat loss caused by agriculture, selective logging, and human settlement.
