= Duida–Marahuaca National Park =

Protected area in Amazonas, Venezuela

Duida–Marahuaca National Park is a protected area in Amazonas state, Venezuela. It has an area of 210,000 ha, and includes the Duida–Marahuaca Massif.

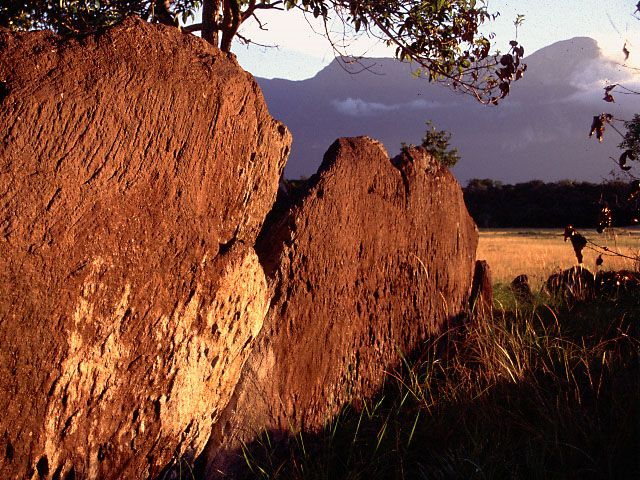
Cerro Duida

The national park was established in 1978. It has been included within the Alto Orinoco-Casiquiare Biosphere Reserve, which was designated in 1993.

== Endemic fauna ==
=== Frogs ===
Venezuela's tepuys are the home of a number of endemic frog species. Sometimes these species are known from only a single tepuy, as is the case of several which are to be found in the national park.

- Cerro Duida
  - Mount Duida frog (Dischidodactylus duidensis)
- Cerro Marahuaca

Several frog species are only known from the summit of Cerro Marahuaca, including Pristimantis marahuaka, Metaphryniscus sosai, and Myersiohyla inparquesi.

=== Birdlife ===
- Duida grass finch (Emberizoides duidae)

== See also ==
- List of national parks of Venezuela
- Cerro Huachamacari
