= Pristimantis melanogaster =

Conservation status
- Near Threatened (IUCN 3.1)

Scientific classification
- Kingdom: Animalia
- Phylum: Chordata
- Class: Amphibia
- Order: Anura
- Clade: Brachycephaloidea
- Family: Craugastoridae
- Genus: Pristimantis
- Species: P. melanogaster

Binomial name
- Pristimantis melanogaster (Duellman and Pramuk, 1999)

Synonyms
- Eleutherodactylus melanogaster Duellman and Pramuk, 1999; Craugastor melanogaster (Duellman and Pramuk, 1999)

Species of frog

Pristimantis melanogaster is a species of frog in the family Strabomantidae. It is endemic to northern Peru where it is only known from vicinity of the type locality in the Bagua Province, Amazonas Region. Its natural habitats are páramo and elfin forest within very humid montane forest at elevations of 2,800–3,470 m (9,190–11,380 ft) asl. It is known from only three locations in a region subject to destruction of habitat through agriculture, livestock grazing and wood extraction.
