= Pristimantis baiotis =

Conservation status
- Near Threatened (IUCN 3.1)

Scientific classification
- Kingdom: Animalia
- Phylum: Chordata
- Class: Amphibia
- Order: Anura
- Clade: Brachycephaloidea
- Family: Craugastoridae
- Genus: Pristimantis
- Species: P. baiotis

Binomial name
- Pristimantis baiotis (Lynch, 1998)

Synonyms
- Eleutherodactylus baiotis Lynch, 1998

Species of frog

Pristimantis baiotis is a species of frog in the family Strabomantidae. It is endemic to the Cordillera Occidental, Colombia, and only known from the region of its type locality, Las Orquideas in Antioquia. Its natural habitats are premontane and cloud forests. It is usually found at medium–low heights above the ground on vegetation, inside the forest or at the forest edge. The known distribution is in the Las Orquídeas National Natural Park, and there are no threats to its habitat.
