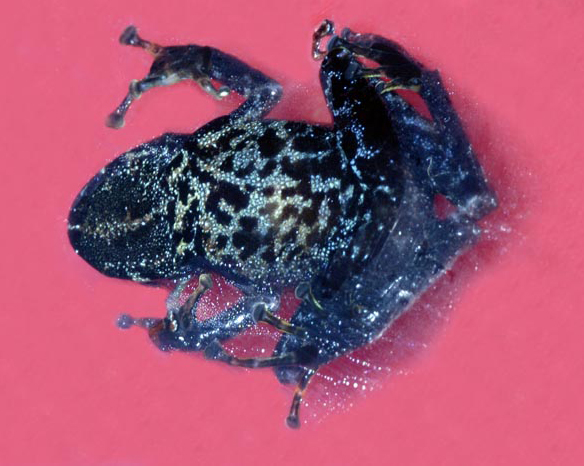
- Ceuthomantis smaragdinus

Scientific classification
- Kingdom: Animalia
- Phylum: Chordata
- Class: Amphibia
- Order: Anura
- Superfamily: Hyloidea
- Clade: Brachycephaloidea
- Family: Ceuthomantidae; Heinicke et al, 2009
- Genus: Ceuthomantis; Heinicke, Duellman, Trueb, Means, MacCulloch, and Hedges, 2009

Type species
- Ceuthomantis smaragdinus Heinicke et al., 2009

Species
- 4 species (see text)

= Ceuthomantis =

Genus of amphibians

Ceuthomantis is a small genus of craugastorid frogs, also treated as comprising their own monogeneric family Ceuthomantidae. They are found in the southern and eastern parts of the Guiana Highlands in Venezuela, Guyana, and Brazil. The generic name is derived from the Greek noun mantis, which means treefrog, and adjective keuthos, which means hidden, in allusion to the hidden existence of this genus in the tepuis of the Guiana Shield.

== Taxonomy ==
Ceuthomantis was first described as the only genus in its own family Ceuthomantidae, but is now merged with Pristimantinae; the oldest name for this taxon is Ceuthomantinae. The AmphibiaWeb maintains Ceuthomantidae as a monogeneric family.

Ceuthomantis is closely related to Dischidodactylus, with which they share a synapomorphy: completely or almost completely divided ungual flaps. Both genera also have dorsal skin composed of small, flat, pliable (not keratinized) warts, and lack nuptial pads in adult males. They differ in that Dischidodactylus possesses a dentigerous process of the vomer, and in that Ceuthomantis lack basal toe webbing.

== Description ==
Ceuthomantis are greenish frogs with narrow heads. They have T-shaped terminal phalanges and paired, dorsal, gland-like protrusions in the post-temporal and sacral regions; the function of the latter is unknown. They have notched digital discs on the fingers and toes. Vomerine teeth and nuptial pads are absent.

== Species ==
The genus contains four species:

- Ceuthomantis aracamuni (Barrio-Amorós and Molina, 2006)
- Ceuthomantis cavernibardus (Myers and Donnelly, 1997)
- Ceuthomantis duellmani Barrio-Amorós, 2010
- Ceuthomantis smaragdinus Heinicke, Duellman, Trueb, Means, MacCulloch, and Hedges, 2009
