= Pristimantis marahuaka =

Conservation status
- Near Threatened (IUCN 3.1)

Scientific classification
- Kingdom: Animalia
- Phylum: Chordata
- Class: Amphibia
- Order: Anura
- Family: Strabomantidae
- Genus: Pristimantis
- Species: P. marahuaka

Binomial name
- Pristimantis marahuaka (Fuentes & Barrio-Amorós, 2004)

Synonyms
- Eleutherodactylus marahuaka Fuentes & Barrio-Amorós, 2004

Species of amphibian

Pristimantis marahuaka is a species of frog in the family Strabomantidae. It is endemic to the summit of Cerro Marahuaca, a tepui in central Amazonas state, Venezuela. Its natural habitat is tepui shrubland at around 2,450 m (8,040 ft) asl where it is common in the mossy bases of Heliamphora plants.

There are no direct threats to this species, but given its small range (<20 km^{2}), it is considered "near threatened" by the International Union for Conservation of Nature.
