= Myersiohyla inparquesi =

Conservation status
- Near Threatened (IUCN 3.1)

Scientific classification
- Kingdom: Animalia
- Phylum: Chordata
- Class: Amphibia
- Order: Anura
- Family: Hylidae
- Genus: Myersiohyla
- Species: M. inparquesi

Binomial name
- Myersiohyla inparquesi (Ayarzagüena and Señaris, 1994)

Synonyms
- Hyla inparquesi Ayarzagüena and Señaris, 1994 "1993"

Species of frog

Myersiohyla inparquesi is a species of frog in the family Hylidae. It appears to be endemic to the summit of Cerro Marahuaca, a tepui in central Amazonas state, Venezuela. Its natural habitats are tepui shrub and forests. Tadpoles live in fast-flowing streams.
