= Cerro Duida =

Venezuelan tepui

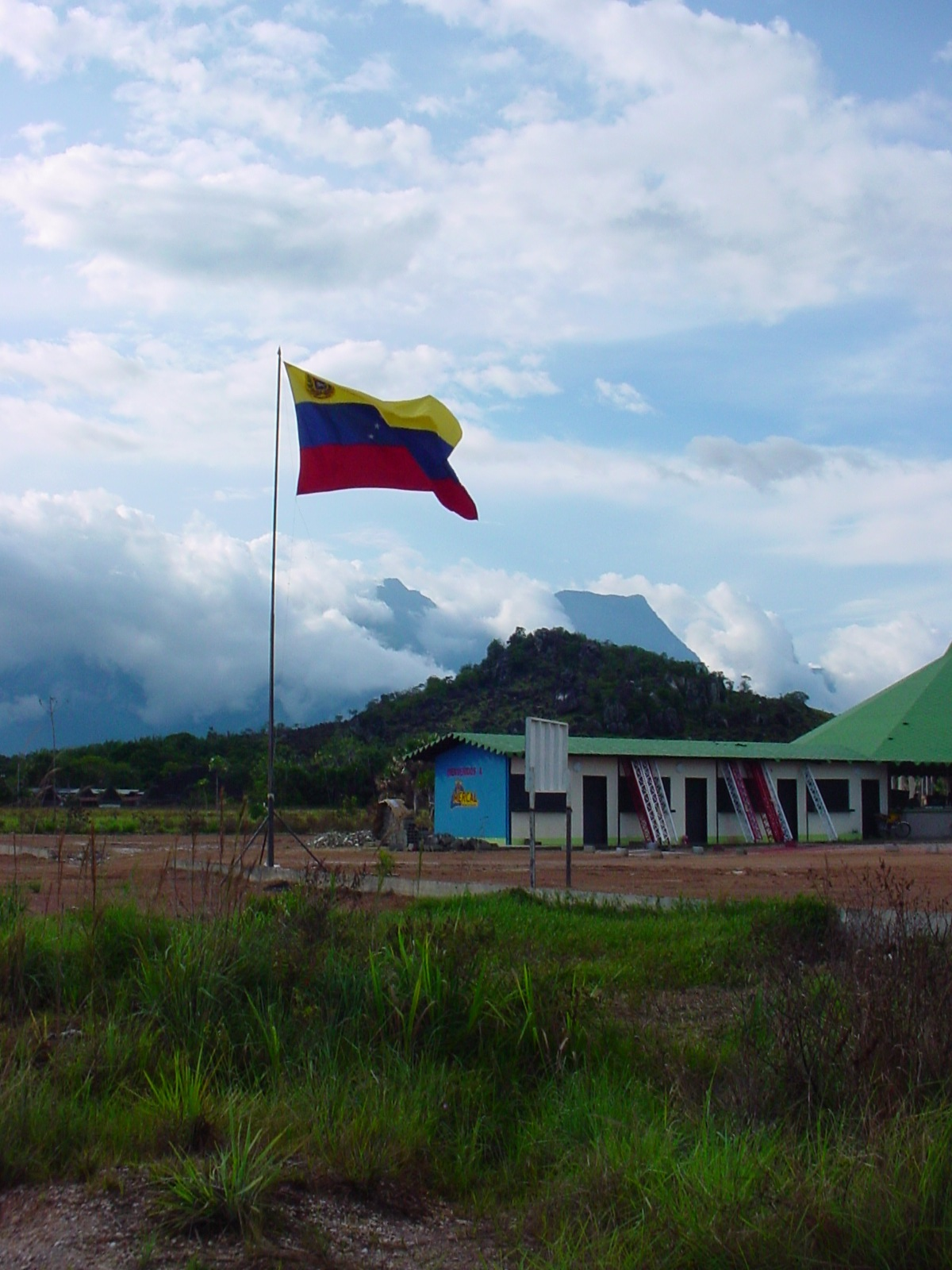
- Cerro Duida (background) as seen from La Esmeralda

Highest point
- Elevation: 2,358 m (7,736 ft)
- Coordinates: 03°30′48″N 65°37′34″W

Geography
- Location within Venezuela
- Location: Amazonas, Venezuela

Cerro Duida, known as Yennamadi by the Ye'kuana, is a very large tepui in Amazonas state, Venezuela. It has an uneven and heavily inclined plateau, rising from highs of around 1,300–1,400 metres (4,300–4,600 ft) in the north and east to a maximum of 2,358 metres (7,736 ft) on its southwestern rim. It has a summit area of 1,089 km^{2} (420 sq mi) and an estimated slope area of 715 km^{2} (276 sq mi). At its foot lies the small settlement of La Esmeralda, from which the mountain can be climbed.

Cerro Duida shares a common base with the much smaller (but taller) Cerro Marahuaca, located off its northeastern flank, and together they form the Duida–Marahuaca Massif. Both tepuis are entirely within the bounds of Duida-Marahuaca National Park. Sandwiched between them, a massive ridge known as Cerro Petaca rises to at least 2,700 metres (8,900 ft). The much lower Cerro Huachamacari, derived from a separate base, lies to the northwest of this complex.

== Tyler-Duida expedition ==
George Henry Hamilton Tate led a major expedition of the American Museum of Natural History to Cerro Duida in 1928–1929. Named the Tyler-Duida Expedition, it was the first to reach the mountain's summit plateau and the first to climb a tepui of the Venezuelan Amazon. Mount Duida frog was first collected during the expedition and is still not known from anywhere else, although it was formally described only 40 years later. Although primarily a zoological expedition, much plant material was collected. These herbarium collections were studied extensively by Henry Gleason, who formally described many of the mountain's plant species in a series of papers published in 1931. This was followed by a number of important botanical explorations of Cerro Duida, first by Julian A. Steyermark in 1944 and later by Bassett Maguire in 1949 and 1950.

== See also ==
- Distribution of Heliamphora
- Duida grass finch
