= Pristimantis philipi =

Conservation status
- Data Deficient (IUCN 3.1)

Scientific classification
- Kingdom: Animalia
- Phylum: Chordata
- Class: Amphibia
- Order: Anura
- Clade: Brachycephaloidea
- Family: Craugastoridae
- Genus: Pristimantis
- Species: P. philipi

Binomial name
- Pristimantis philipi (Lynch & Duellman, 1995)

Synonyms
- Eleutherodactylus philipi Lynch & Duellman, 1995

Species of frog

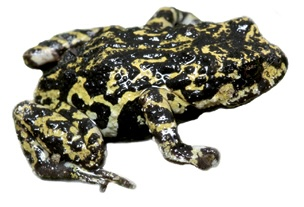
Pristimantis philipi

Pristimantis philipi is a species of frog in the family Strabomantidae. It is endemic to Ecuador. Its natural habitat is tropical high-altitude grassland.
