= Loveridge's tree frog =

Conservation status
- Near Threatened (IUCN 3.1)

Scientific classification
- Kingdom: Animalia
- Phylum: Chordata
- Class: Amphibia
- Order: Anura
- Family: Hylidae
- Genus: Myersiohyla
- Species: M. loveridgei

Binomial name
- Myersiohyla loveridgei (Rivero, 1961)

Synonyms
- Hyla ginesi Rivero, 1963

Species of amphibian

Loveridge's tree frog (Myersiohyla loveridgei) is a species of frogs in the family Hylidae endemic to Venezuela. Its natural habitats are subtropical or tropical moist lowland forests and rivers.
