= Loveridge, West Virginia =

- Unincorporated community
- Location within West Virginia Location within the United States
- Coordinates: 38°04′58″N 80°22′25″W
- Country: United States
- State: West Virginia
- County: Greenbrier
- Elevation: 2,264 ft (690 m)
- Time zone: UTC-5 (Eastern (EST))
  - Summer (DST): UTC-4 (EDT)
- Area codes: 304 & 681
- GNIS feature ID: 1555002

Loveridge is an unincorporated community in Greenbrier County, West Virginia, United States. Loveridge is 6.5 miles (10.5 km) north-northwest of Falling Spring.
