= Cerro Marahuaca =

Mountain (tepui) in Venezuela

- Location within Venezuela

Highest point
- Elevation: 2,832 m (9,291 ft)
- Prominence: 2,289 m (7,510 ft)
- Listing: Ultra
- Coordinates: 03°39′36″N 65°24′24″W

Geography
- Location: Amazonas, Venezuela

Cerro Marahuaca, also spelled Marahuaka (Ye'kuana: Madawaka), is a tepui in Amazonas state, Venezuela. It has an elevation of 2,832 metres (9,291 ft) above sea level and is the second-highest mountain of the entire Guayana Shield (after the Cerro de la Neblina complex). Cerro Marahuaca shares a common base with the much larger Cerro Duida and together they form the Duida–Marahuaca Massif. Both tepuis are located entirely within the bounds of Duida–Marahuaca National Park.

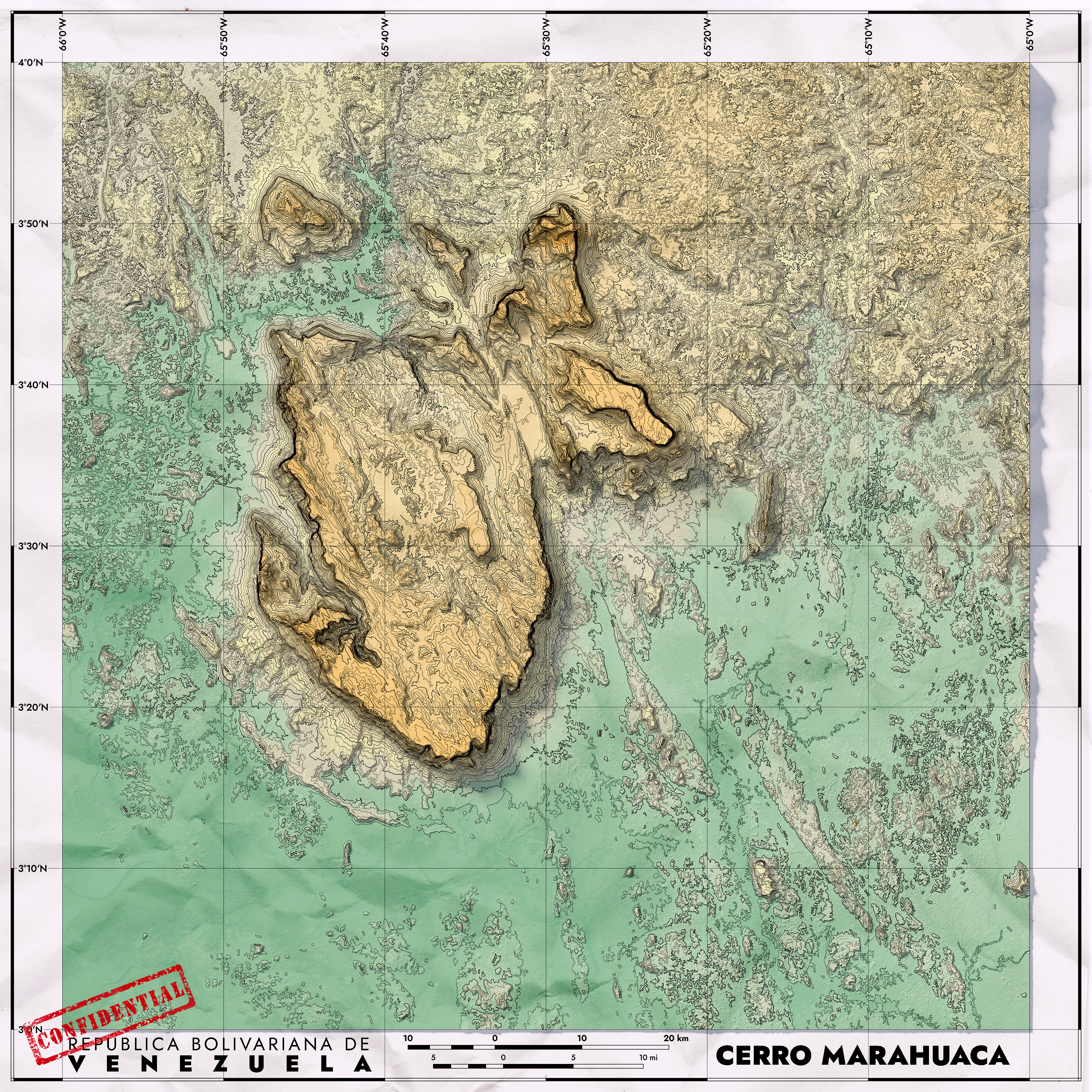
Topographic map of Cerro Marahuaca

Cerro Marahuaca actually consists of two summit plateaus, the slightly larger northern one going by the Yekwana Amerindian name Fufha or Huha (03°46′52″N 65°29′31″W). The southern plateau (03°39′04″N 65°25′01″W) is known by two local names; its northwestern edge is called Fuif or Fhuif, whereas its southeastern portion is called Atahua'shiho or Atawa Shisho. A massive ridge known as Cerro Petaca rises to at least 2,700 metres (8,900 ft) just west of these two plateaus. In 1973, the Italian expeditioner Walter Bonatti attempted to climb Cerro Marahuaca without success. The first recorded ascent of Cerro Marahuaca dates back to 1984 on its Southwest face by Venezuelan climbers Luis Enrique (Kike) Arnal, Ramón Blanco, Manuel Guariguata and José Luis Pereyra.

Cerro Marahuaca has a total summit area of 121 km^{2} (47 sq mi) and an estimated slope area of 325 km^{2} (125 sq mi).

== Flora and fauna ==
Several frog species are only known from the summit of Cerro Marahuaca, including Pristimantis marahuaka, Metaphryniscus sosai, and Myersiohyla inparquesi.

== See also ==
- Distribution of Heliamphora
- List of Ultras of South America
