= Cerro Huachamacari =

Mountain in Venezuela

- Location within Venezuela

Highest point
- Elevation: 1,900 m (6,200 ft)
- Coordinates: 03°50′47″N 65°45′22″W

Geography
- Location: Amazonas, Venezuela

Cerro Huachamacari, also spelled Huachamakari or Kushamakari, is a tepui in Amazonas state, Venezuela. It lies northwest of the giant Cerro Duida and the other peaks of the Duida–Marahuaca Massif, and is considerably lower at only around 1,900 metres (6,200 ft).

Cerro Huachamacari has a summit area of 8.75 km^{2} (3.38 sq mi) and an estimated slope area of 60 km^{2} (23 sq mi). It is within Duida-Marahuaca National Park.

== See also ==
- Distribution of Heliamphora
