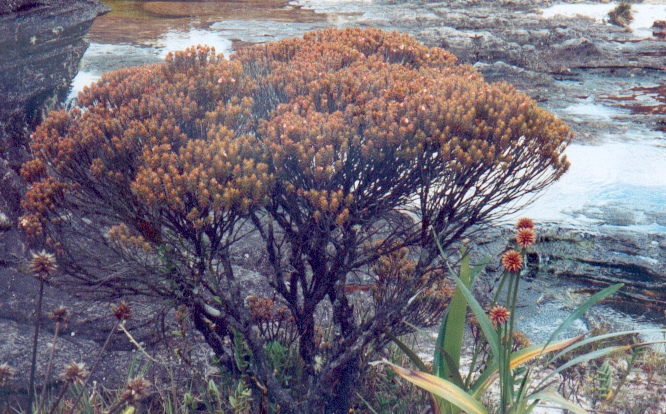
- Bonnetia roraimae

Scientific classification
- Kingdom: Plantae
- Clade: Tracheophytes
- Clade: Angiosperms
- Clade: Eudicots
- Clade: Rosids
- Order: Malpighiales
- Family: Bonnetiaceae; L.Beauvis. ex Nakai

Genera
- Archytaea; Bonnetia; Ploiarium

= Bonnetiaceae =

Family of flowering plants

Bonnetiaceae is a family of flowering plants, consisting of 3 genera and 38 species. The family is Neotropical, with the exception of the genus Ploiarium, which is found in Malesia. It is sister to the family Clusiaceae.
