= Near-threatened species =

IUCN conservation category

A near-threatened species is a species which has been categorized as "Near Threatened" (NT) by the International Union for Conservation of Nature (IUCN) as one that may be vulnerable to endangerment in the near future, but it does not currently qualify for the threatened status.

The IUCN notes the importance of reevaluating near-threatened taxa at appropriate intervals.

The rationale used for near-threatened taxa usually includes the criteria of vulnerable which are plausible or nearly met, such as reduction in numbers or range. Those designated since 2001 that depend on conservation efforts to not become threatened are no longer separately considered conservation-dependent species.

== IUCN Categories and Criteria version 2.3 ==
Diagram of Lower Risk / near threatened in the older IUCN version 2.3, beside the former Lower Risk / conservation dependent subcategory.

Before 2001, the IUCN used the version 2.3 Categories and Criteria to assign conservation status, which included a separate category for conservation-dependent species ("Conservation Dependent", LR/cd). With this category system, Near Threatened and Conservation Dependent were both subcategories of the category "Lower Risk". Taxa which were last evaluated before 2001 may retain their LR/cd or LR/nt status, although had the category been assigned with the same information today the species would be designated simply "Near Threatened (NT)" in either case.

== Gallery ==
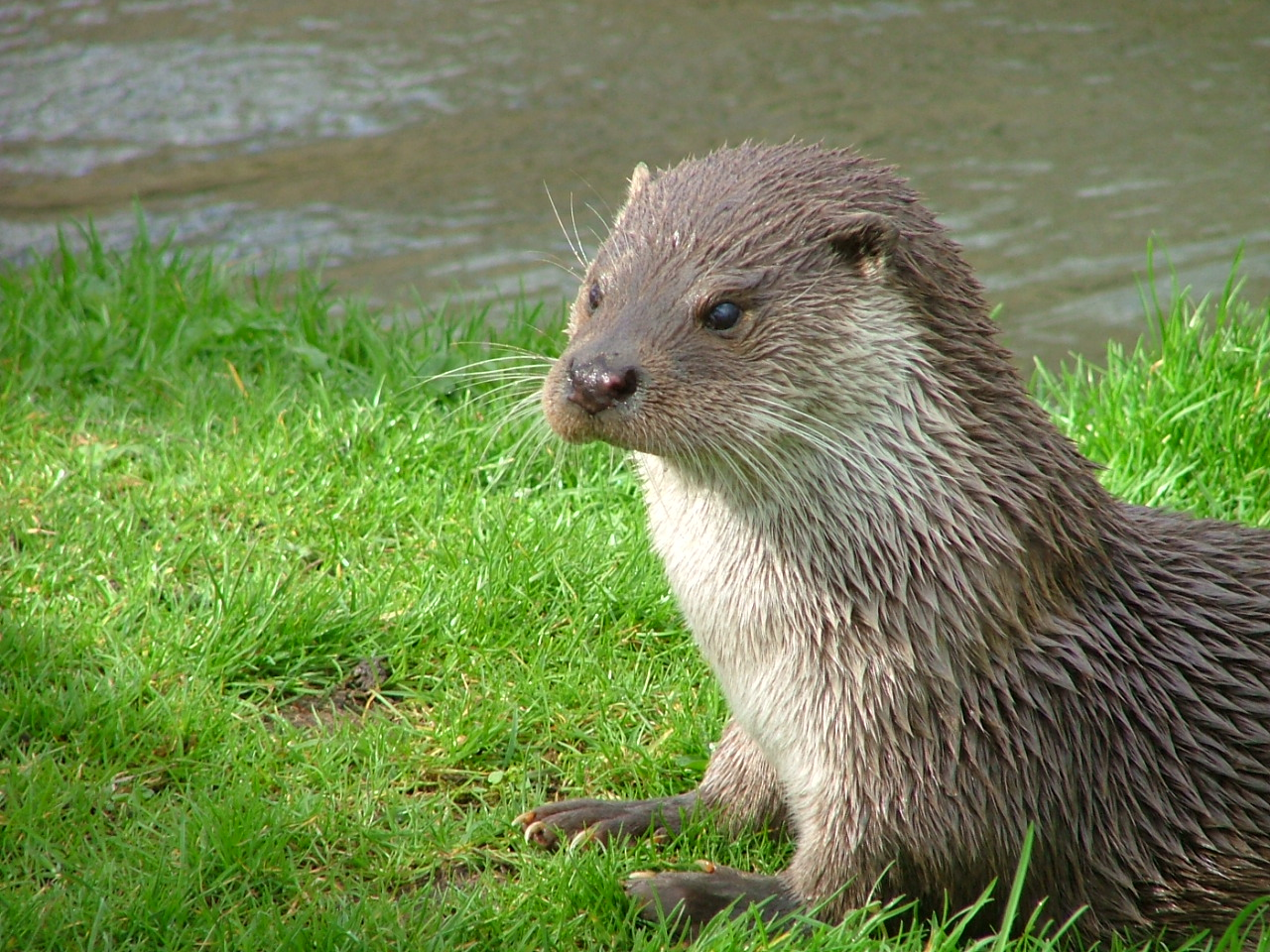
The Eurasian otter has been uplisted to near-threatened, thanks to sanitizing rivers, harmful pesticides being banned and reintroductions to their environment.

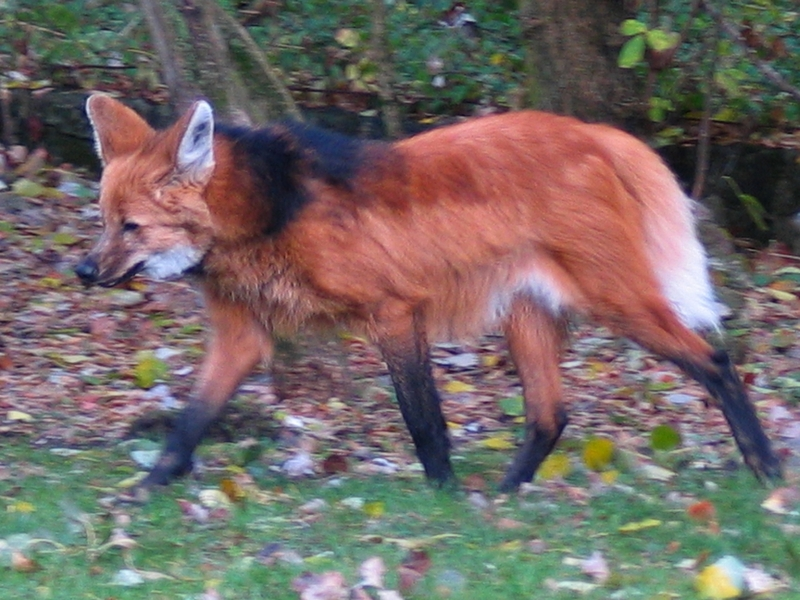
The maned wolf is near-threatened largely due to habitat loss.

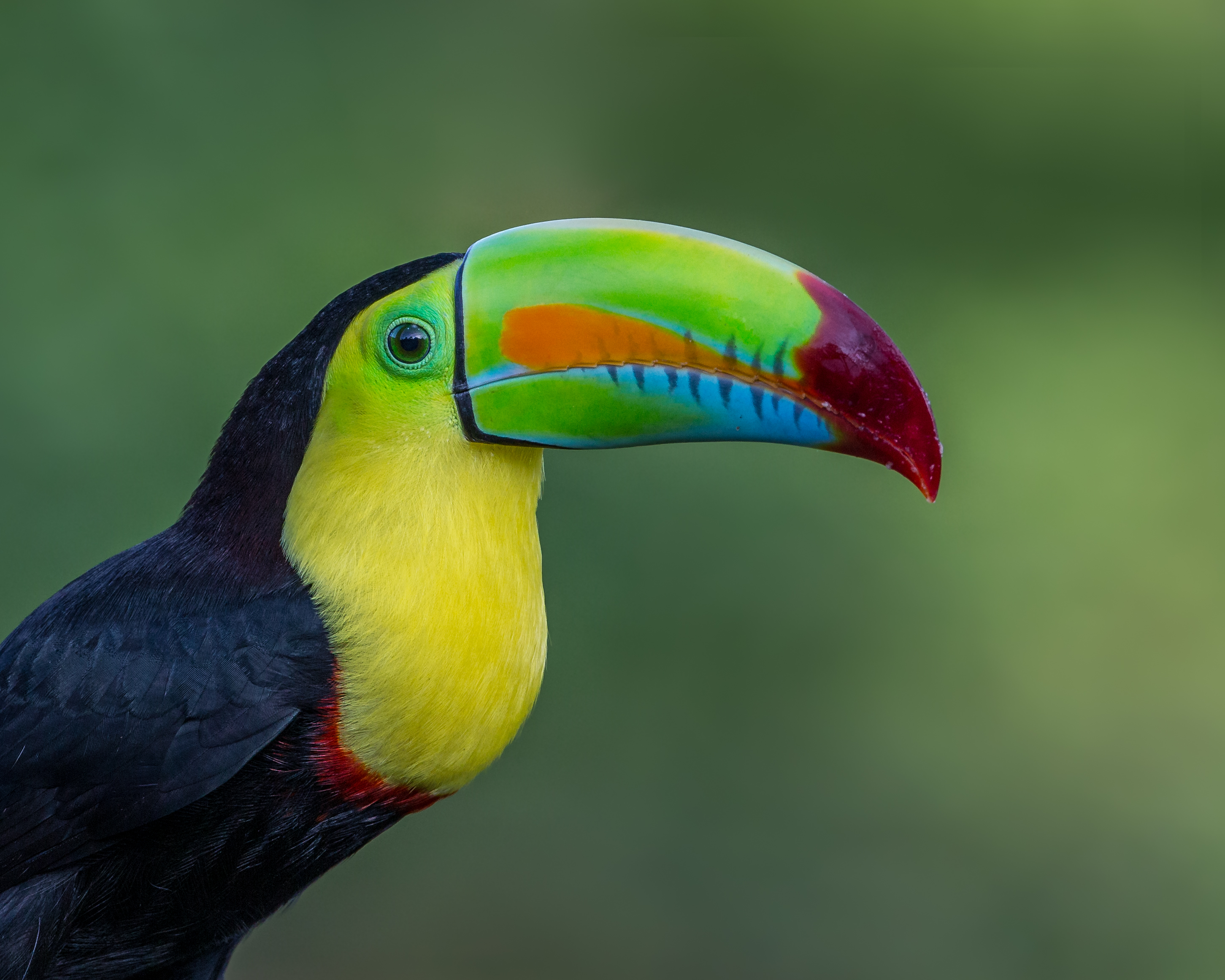
The keel-billed toucan is near-threatened due to habitat loss and the illegal pet trade.

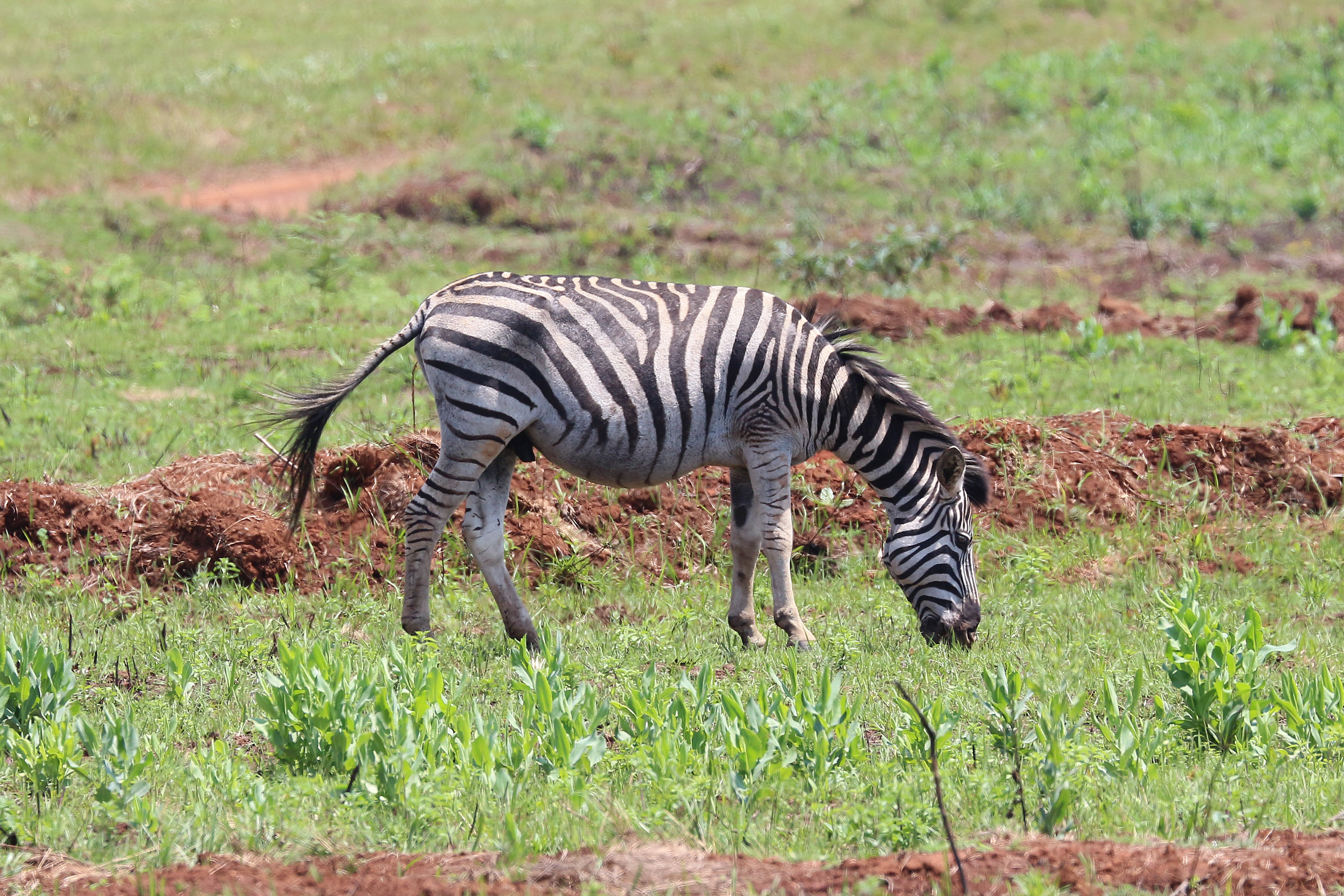
Plains zebras are listed as near-threatened due to hunting and habitat loss.

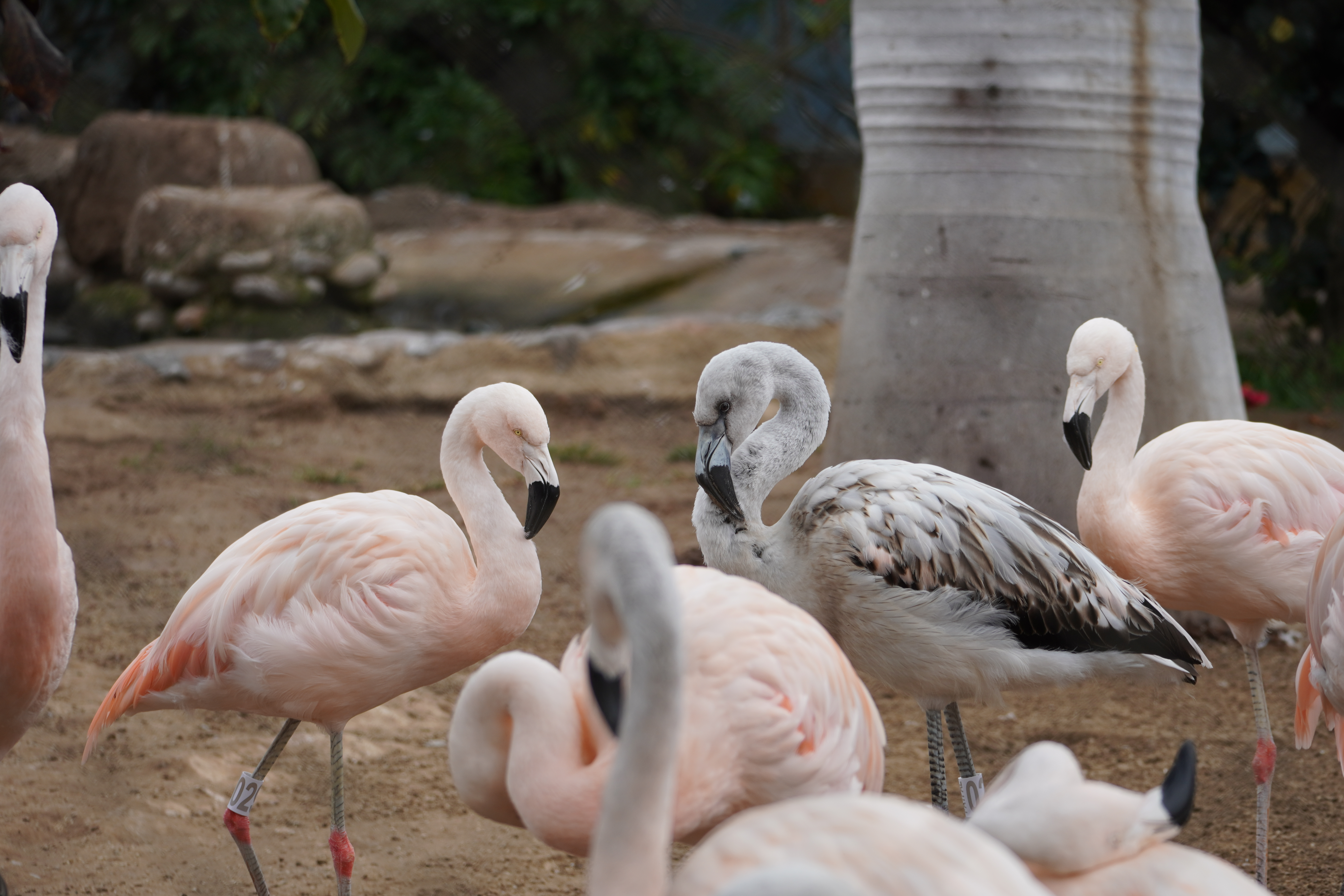
The Chilean flamingo is near-threatened, due to illegal mining, irrigation and hunting for eggs and adults.

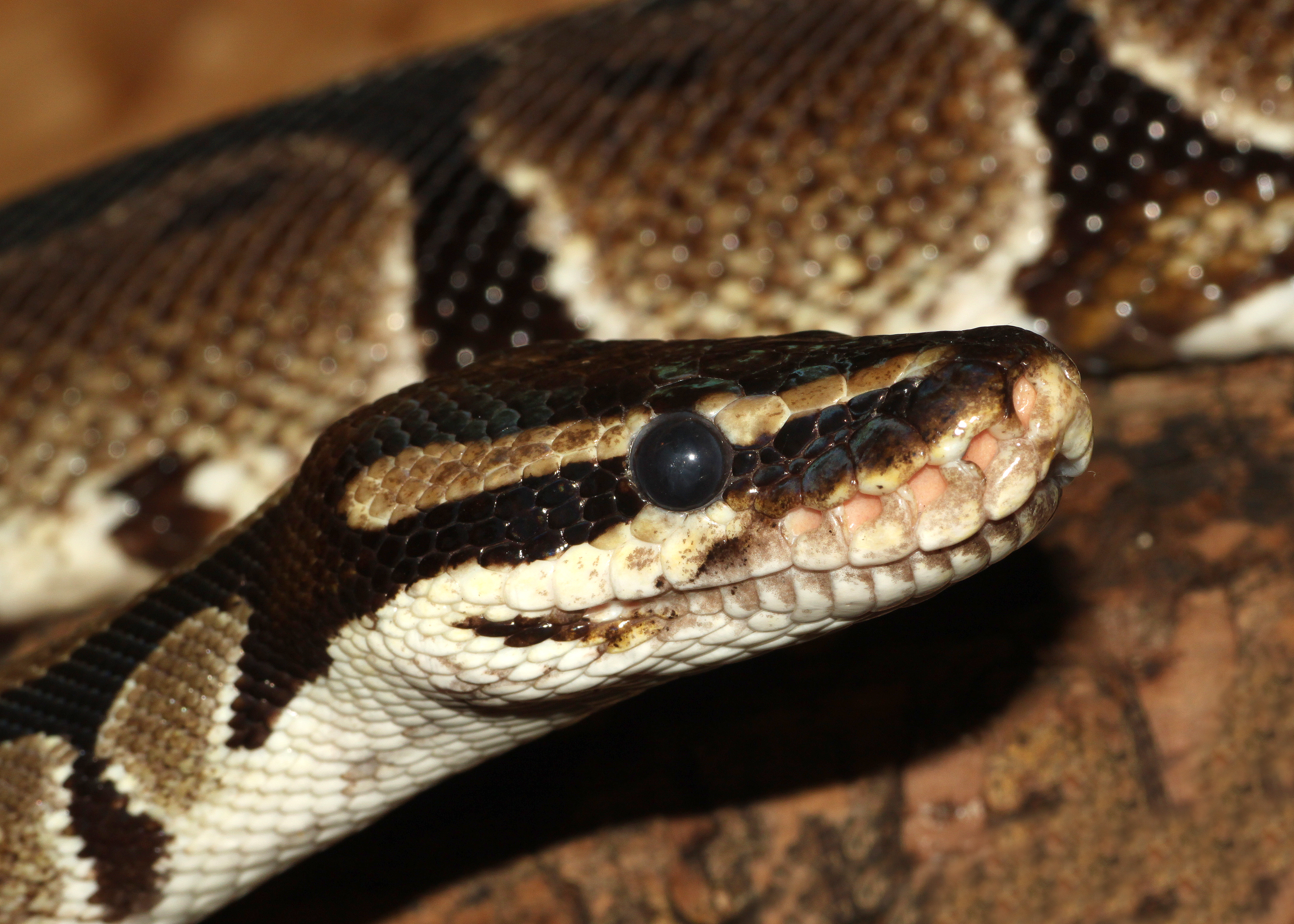
The ball python, formerly a common species, is near-threatened as a result of illegal trade and poaching.

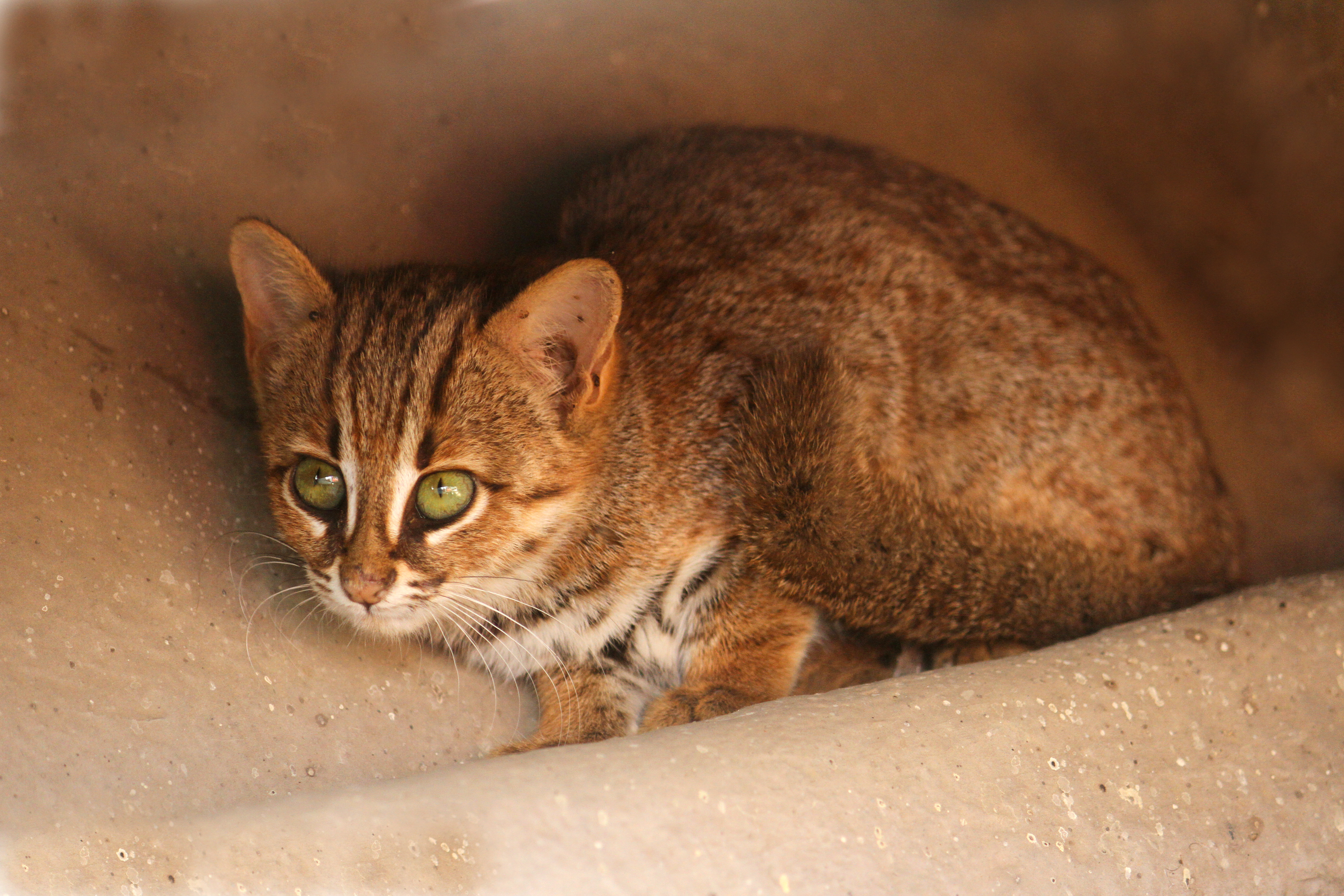
The rusty-spotted cat, since 2016, it has been listed as near threatened on the IUCN Red List as the global population is affected by loss and destruction of its prime habitat, deciduous forests.

== See also ==
- IUCN Red List near threatened species, ordered by taxonomic rank.
- Category:IUCN Red List near threatened species, ordered alphabetically.
- List of near threatened amphibians
- List of near threatened arthropods
- List of near threatened birds
- List of near threatened fishes
- List of near threatened insects
- List of near threatened invertebrates
- List of near threatened mammals
- List of near threatened molluscs
- List of near threatened plants
- List of near threatened reptiles
