= Margarita indigo snake =

Conservation status
- Least Concern (IUCN 3.1)

Scientific classification
- Kingdom: Animalia
- Phylum: Chordata
- Class: Reptilia
- Order: Squamata
- Suborder: Serpentes
- Family: Colubridae
- Genus: Drymarchon
- Species: D. margaritae

Binomial name
- Drymarchon margaritae Roze, 1959

Species of snake

The Margarita indigo snake (Drymarchon margaritae) is a species of non-venomous snake in the family Colubridae. The species is endemic to the island of Margarita, Nueva Esparta in Venezuela.

== Taxonomy ==
The Margarita indigo snake was first formally described in 1959 by the Latviah herpetologist Janis Roze, with its type locality given as near San Francisco de Macanao, Isla Margarita, Venezuela. This species is a member of the genus Drymarchon, which was proposed by Leopold Fitzinger in 1843, with Coluber corais as its type species. This genus is included in the subfamily Colubrinae of the speciose snake family Colubridae.

== Etymology ==
The Margarita indigo snake is a member of the genus Drymarchon. This name is derived from the Greek drymos, which means "oak forest", and archon, meaning "leader", and is probably an allusion to the large size of D. corais.

== Description ==
The Margarita indigo snake was differentiated from the indigo snake (D. corais) by Rozel in having internasal scales that are longer than the prefrontal scales; the overall colour is very dark, almost black, as is the posterior part of the belly and tail; and this species has fewer ventral scales. The scale counts are 17-17-15 dorsal scales, 196 ventral scales and 76 subcaudal scales. The holotype is a male and measured 1,300 mm (51 in) in length.

== Distribution and habitat ==
The Margarita indigo snake is endemic to Isla Margarita in Nueva Esparta state, Venezuela, in the Caribbean Sea. This is a diurnal, terrestrial species which is found in both deciduous and evergreen forests. It is a little-known species of which there are only two specimens, although it has been informally recorded and photographed more frequently.

== Diet ==
The diet of this species includes a wide variety of amphibians (even toxic ones such as Rhinella bella, although the snake may die if it ingests the frog), birds and their eggs, hawks, swamp eels, lizards, turtles (Rhinoclemmys nasuta), bats, other small mammals, and other snakes (including Central American boas, Bothrops asper, Spilotes pullatus, and Micrurus dumerilii).
