= Ocellated tegu =

Two species of lizard are named ocellated tegu:

- Cercosaura bassleri
- Cercosaura ocellata
