= Matthias Schmutzer =

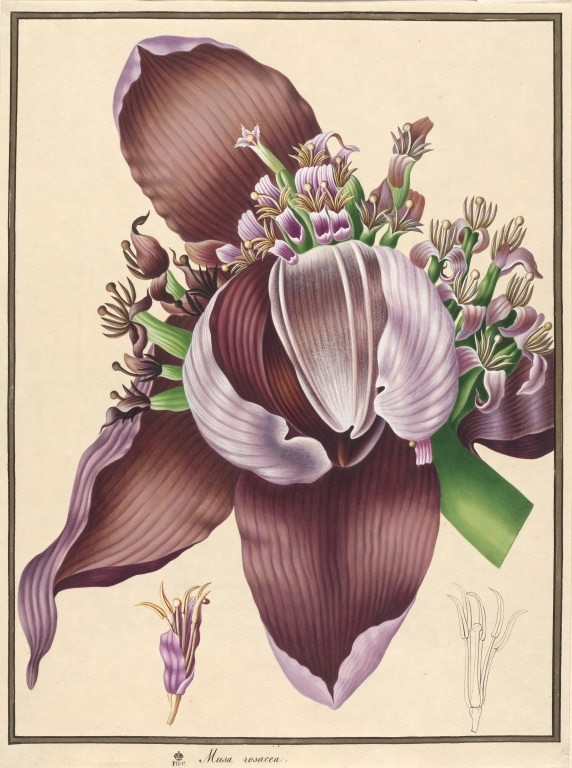
Musa balbisiana

Matthias Schmutzer (11 May 1752, Vienna – 19 June 1824, Vienna) was an Austrian botanical illustrator noted for his work "Das Florilegium Kaiser Franz I", a compendium of plants from the garden of Emperor Francis I. Schmutzer worked on the paintings between 1794 and 1824, producing 1433 plates known as "Florilegium A". In 1766 he attended a class on copper engraving at the Imperial Academy of Fine Arts, but it was only on his appointment as court botanical artist that his work became well known.

The large number of preliminary studies indicates that he made these on site in the gardens. Moving the plant specimens to the studio would probably have been too time-consuming. Schmutzer worked on paper of different quality and size with graphite pencil, watercolours and ink. The leaves are provided with notes such as the scientific name of the plants, location and date. In the studio he transferred the preparatory work to paper or parchment. When it seemed aesthetically necessary to him, he changed and varied individual representations.

On the death of Matthias Schmutzer in 1824 the painter Johann Jebmayer continued work on the Florilegium from October 1824 to about 1847. For an annual salary of 500 guilders, he captured not only the exotic, but also the most beautiful domestic plants from the imperial gardens. The result was a total of 528 large-format watercolours, "Florilegium B", which are kept in the archives of the Austrian National Library. Johann Jebmayer was born in Vienna in 1770, the son of a coachman. He died on 25 April 1858, aged 88 years at his home in Vienna. On his death certificate he is referred to as a painter of farmyard scenes.

The Florilegium was executed from the beginning under the watchful eye of Nikolaus Joseph von Jacquin and after his death by that of his son Joseph Franz.
