= Atractus lancinii =

Conservation status
- Least Concern (IUCN 3.1)

Scientific classification
- Kingdom: Animalia
- Phylum: Chordata
- Class: Reptilia
- Order: Squamata
- Suborder: Serpentes
- Family: Colubridae
- Genus: Atractus
- Species: A. lancinii

Binomial name
- Atractus lancinii Roze, 1961

Species of snake

Atractus lancinii, also known commonly as Lancini's ground snake and tigrita in Venezuelan Spanish, is a species of snake in the subfamily Dipsadinae of the family Colubridae. The species is endemic to Venezuela.

== Etymology ==
The specific name, lancinii, is in honor of Venezuelan herpetologist Abdem Ramón Lancini.

== Description ==
A. lancinii may attain a total length (including tail) of 48 cm (19 in), but most adults are around 30 cm (12 in) long. The head is not distinct from the neck. The eye is rather small, and the pupil is round. The body is cylindrical, and the tail is short. The dorsal scales are smooth, without apical pits, and are arranged in 17 rows throughout the length of the body.

== Geographic range ==
A. lancinii is found in the Central Coastal Range of Venezuela, in the Distrito Federal and the states of Carabobo and Miranda.

== Habitat ==
The preferred natural habitat of A. lancinii is forest, at altitudes of 800–2,000 m (2,600–6,600 ft).

== Reproduction ==
A. lancinii is oviparous.
