= MiDCA1 =

Ion channel toxin

MiDCA1, short for Micrurus dumerili carinicauda 1, is a β-neurotoxin primarily affecting presynaptic synapses, where it interferes with the release of neurotransmitters by inhibiting potassium (K^{+}) channels. This toxin belongs to the phospholipase A2 (PLA2) family but distinguishes itself by existing as a monomer, unlike some other PLA2 toxins. It occurs naturally in the venom of the coral snake Micrurus dumerili carinicauda.

== Sources ==
MiDCA1, characterized as a β-neurotoxin, is naturally occurring within the venom of the Micrurus dumerili carinicauda coral snake. MdumPLA_{2}, a related toxin, has also been detected in this snake's venom.

== Chemistry ==
MiDCA1 is a member of the PLA2 family. When comparing the sequence of MiDCA1 to that of the PLA2 family, the most significant similarities were identified with MICNI A (77.7%), MICNI B (73.3%), both derived from Micrurus nigrocinctus, and NAJMO (71.5%), obtained from Naja mossambica. The homology of the Ca^{2+} binding loop and the catalytic site was most conserved between these three toxins, with a 95% shared identity.

In contrast to many other PLA2 toxins, which have been found to create dimeric structures, MiDCA1 exists as a monomer. This protein has a molecular weight of 15,552 Da (~15 kDa) and consists of 120 amino acid residues.

Its primary amino acid sequence is as follows:

^{1}NLIQFLNMIQCTTPGREPLVAFANYGCYCGRGGSGTPVDELDRCCQVHDNCYDTAKKVFGCSPYFTMYSYDCSEGKLTCKDN

NTKCKAAVCNCDRTAALCFAKAPYNDKNYKIDLTKRCQ^{120}

The protein structure of MiDCA1 is characterized by the presence of seven regions, which include:

- N-terminal region
- Calcium binding loop
- Catalytic site
- Anticoagulant site
- β-wing loop
- Neurotoxic site
- C-terminal region or domain

Within the PLA2 family conserved regions close to the calcium-binding loop, which are the neurotoxic loop and the β-wing, are related to binding with muscle (M)-type or neuronal (N)-type PLA_{2} receptors, resulting in neurotoxic effects. Various modifications have been identified, such as the residue Lys86, which is prominently located within the neurotoxic site of MiDCA1 and plays a crucial role in the structural modification of the neurotoxic loop. Moreover, it has been revealed that Lys76 is actively involved in the modification of the β-wing loop. The intricate interplay between the Lys76 and Lys86 residues significantly impacts the potency of MiDCA1. Specifically, modification of the β-wing loop and alternation of the neurotoxic loop by Lys76 and Lys86 respectively reduce the region's hydrophobicity, affecting the toxin's potency with M or N-type receptors.

== Target and Function ==
MiDCA1 functions as a specific, reversible blocker of potassium channels, specifically targeting Kv2.1 channels at nerve terminals. The blockade of these channels impedes the repolarization of the neural membrane, resulting in tonically increased release of neurotransmitters at motor neuron terminals. Due to this action, MiDCA1 is able to produce a neuromuscular blockade which is mostly presynaptic. This neuromuscular blockade depends on both time and concentration of MiDCA1 exposure.

== Toxicity ==
Inhibition of potassium (K^{+}) channels has been associated with hyperexcitability, tissue paralysis, and possible neuronal cell death within the peripheral nervous system (PNS). Venomous animals, through toxins like MiDCA1, target potassium channels to facilitate prey capture.
