= Cercosaura phelpsorum =

Conservation status
- Least Concern (IUCN 3.1)

Scientific classification
- Kingdom: Animalia
- Phylum: Chordata
- Class: Reptilia
- Order: Squamata
- Family: Gymnophthalmidae
- Genus: Cercosaura
- Species: C. phelpsorum

Binomial name
- Cercosaura phelpsorum (Lancini, 1968)

Synonyms
- Euspondylus phelpsi Lancini, 1968; Euspondylus phelpsorum — C. Myers & Donnelly, 1996; Euspondylus goeleti C. Myers & Donnelly, 1996; Prionodactylus phelpsorum — Gorzula & Señaris, 1999; Cercosaura phelpsorum — Doan, 2003

Species of lizard

Cercosaura phelpsorum is a species of lizard in the family Gymnophthalmidae. The species is endemic to Venezuela.

== Etymology ==
The specific name, phelpsorum (genitive plural), is in honor of American ornithologist William H. Phelps Sr. and his family.

== Geographic range ==
C. phelpsorum is found in the Venezuelan states of Amazonas and Bolívar.

== Habitat ==
The preferred habitats of C. phelpsorum are rocky areas and grassland, at altitudes of 1,450–2,550 m (4,760–8,370 ft).

== Reproduction ==
C. phelpsorum is oviparous.
