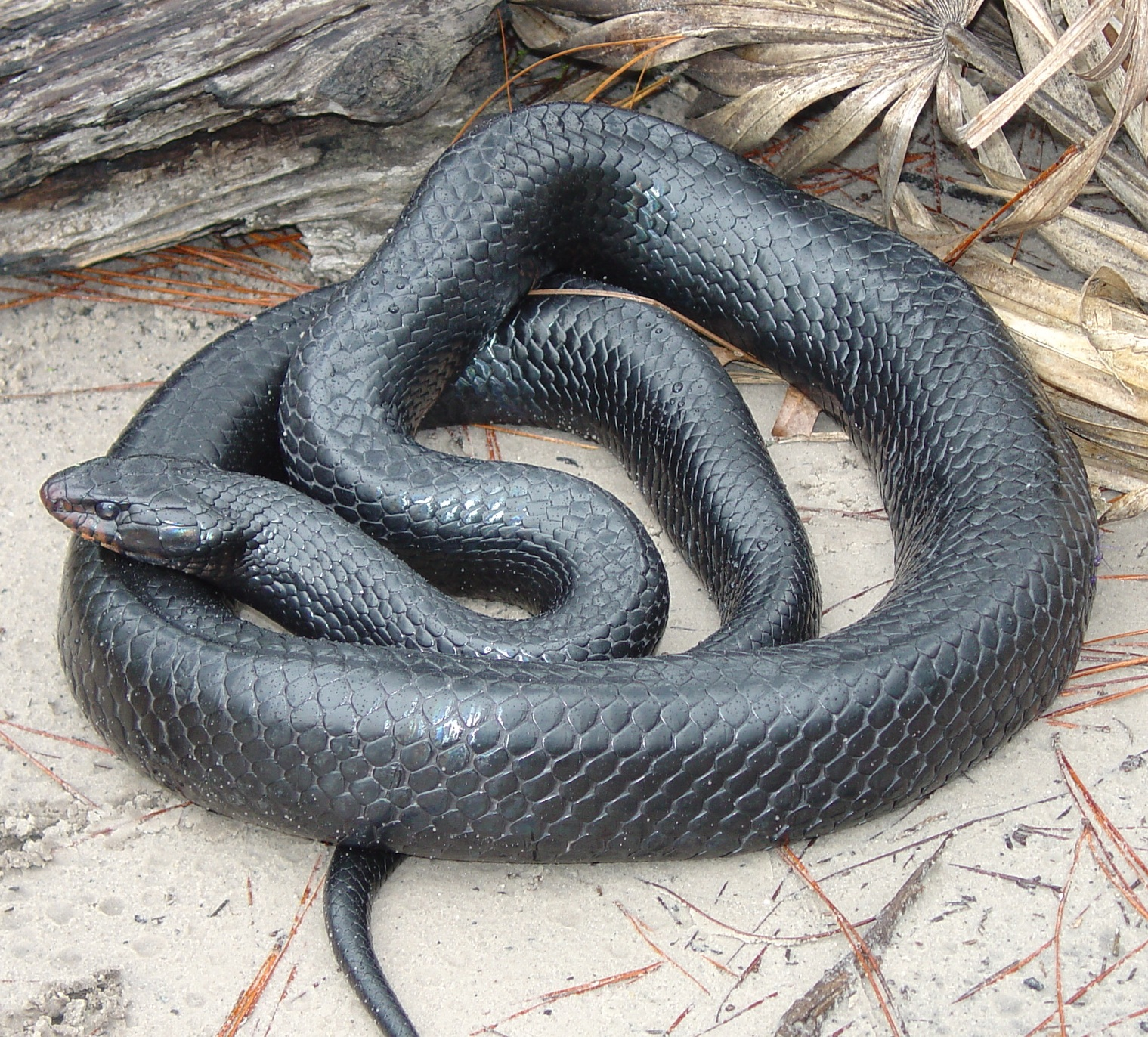

Conservation status
- Least Concern (IUCN 3.1)

- Threatened (ESA)

Scientific classification
- Kingdom: Animalia
- Phylum: Chordata
- Class: Reptilia
- Order: Squamata
- Suborder: Serpentes
- Family: Colubridae
- Genus: Drymarchon
- Species: D. couperi

Binomial name
- Drymarchon couperi (Holbrook, 1842)
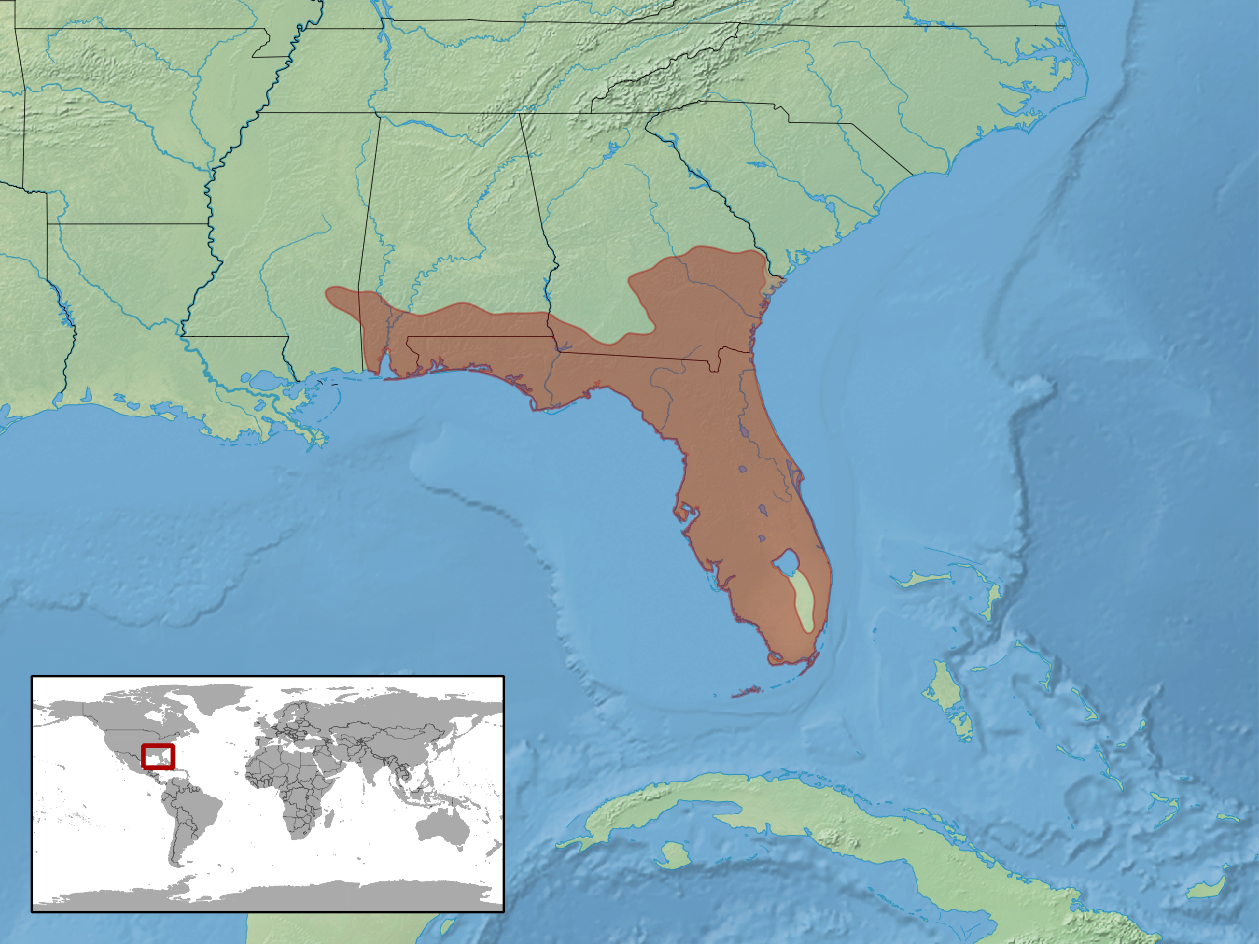

Synonyms
- Coluber couperi Holbrook, 1842; Georgia couperi — Baird & Girard, 1853; Spilotes couperi — Cope, 1860; Spilotes corais couperi — Lönnberg, 1894; Drymarchon corais couperi — Amaral, 1929; Drymarchon couperi — Crother, 2000

= Eastern indigo snake =

Species of snake

The eastern indigo snake (Drymarchon couperi) is a species of large, nonvenomous snake in the subfamily Colubrinae of the family Colubridae. Native to the Southeastern United States, it is the longest native snake species in the country.

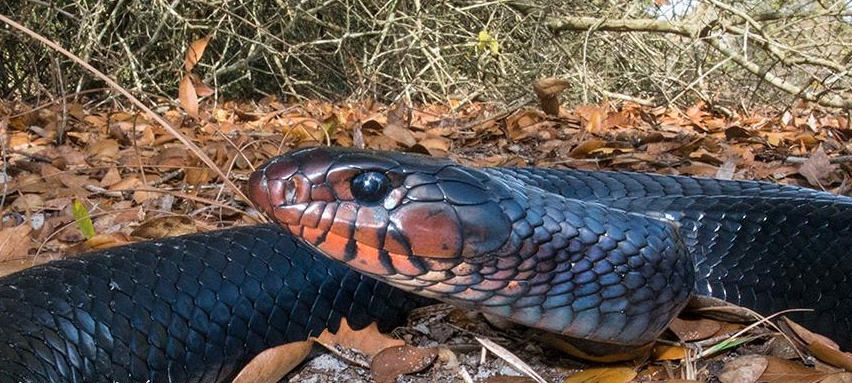
Eastern indigo

== Taxonomy and etymology ==
=== Taxonomy ===
The eastern indigo snake was first described by John Edwards Holbrook in 1842. For many years, the genus Drymarchon was considered monotypic with one species, Drymarchon corais, with 12 subspecies, until the early 1990s, when Drymarchon corais couperi was elevated to full species status according to the Society for the Study of Amphibians and Reptiles, in their official names list.

=== Etymology ===
The generic name, Drymarchon, roughly translates to "lord of the forest". It is composed of the Greek words drymos (Δρυμός), meaning "forest", and archon (ἄρχων), meaning "lord" or "ruler".

The specific name is a latinization of the surname of American planter James Hamilton Couper (1794–1866). Couper brought Holbrook the type specimen from south of the Altamaha River in Wayne County, Georgia.

=== Common names ===
Drymarchon couperi has a number of common names, including black snake, blue bull snake, blue gopher snake, blue indigo snake, eastern indigo snake, and indigo snake.

== Description ==
The eastern indigo snake has uniformly blue-black dorsal scales, with some specimens having a reddish-orange to tan color on the throat, cheeks, and chin. This snake received its common name from the glossy, iridescent dorsal and ventral scales which can be seen as blackish-purple in bright light. This smooth-scaled snake is the longest native snake species in the United States. The longest recorded specimen measured 2.8 m (9.2 ft) in total length (tail included). Unlike many snakes, mature male indigo snakes are slightly larger than females. This is thought to be due to intraspecies competition and combat among males. A typical mature male measures 1.2–2.36 m (3.9–7.7 ft) in total length, with a reported average of 1.58 m (5.2 ft), and weighs 0.72–4.5 kg (1.6–9.9 lb), reportedly averaging 2.2 kg (4.9 lb). Males that measure longer than 1.2 m (4 ft) tend to possess weak keels on mid-dorsal scale rows 3–5, while females lack this characteristic. Mature females typically measure around 1.1–2 m (3.6–6.6 ft) in total length, averaging 1.38 m (4.5 ft), and weigh 0.55–2.7 kg (1.2–6.0 lb), averaging 1.5 kg (3.3 lb). Specimens over 2.6 m (8.5 ft) can weigh up to 5 kg (11 lb). Although the eastern indigo snake is similar in average body mass, extremely large specimens of the bulky, sympatric venomous eastern diamondback rattlesnake can outweigh it.

== Geographic distribution ==
The eastern indigo snake inhabits areas from Florida to the southern areas of Georgia and Alabama. Studies in Georgia showed that the most indigo snake sightings happen within the Tufton Upland region of the Coastal Plain especially in the sand ridges. Their historic range extended into Mississippi and possibly South Carolina. A related species, the Texas indigo snake (Drymarchon melanurus erebennus), is found in southern Texas and Mexico.

== Conservation status ==
Because of habitat loss, the eastern indigo snake is listed in the United States as a federally threatened species. In 2012 the Alabama Department of Conservation and Natural Resources had listed the species as possibly extirpated within the state. A reintroduction program has shown initial signs of success, with an individual sighted in March 2022.

The eastern indigo snake was largely eliminated from northern Florida due to habitat loss and fragmentation. A restoration program is currently underway at Apalachicola Bluffs and Ravines Preserve (ABRP) in northern Florida. It was last observed at ABRP in 1982, until 2017, when 12 snakes were released as part of the program. Twenty more snakes were released in 2018, with another 15 (10 females and five males) in 2019. The 10-year program is a collaborative effort between the Florida Fish and Wildlife Conservation Commission and private partners.

NatureServe considers the species to be "endangered".

Another issue facing the species is infections due to a snake fungal disease caused by Ophidiomyces ophiodiicola. This fungus infects the dermal layer of snake skin, causing a variety of lesions that commonly manifest on the head and near the vent.

Captive eastern indigo snake populations also are affected by Cryptosporidium serpentis. This protozoal parasite causes gastric cryptosporidiosis inside the snake's body, which leads to reduced water and nutrient intake. This causes illness in most and even death in some. If the snake is infected, it may display clinical signs such as dehydration, regurgitation, and weight loss.

== Preferred habitat ==
The eastern indigo snake frequents flatwoods, hammocks, dry glades, stream bottoms, cane fields, riparian thickets, and high ground with well-drained, sandy soils. In Georgia, the eit prefers excessively drained, deep, sandy soils along major streams, as well as xeric sandridge habitats. The species is also strongly associated with longleaf pine and scrub oak communities which usually have turkey oak, live oak, and sand post oak trees. Georgia, they occur in the middle and lower coastal plain. In the northern parts of its range it is restricted to sandhills and requires gopher tortoise burrows during colder seasons. Xeric slash pine plantations seem to be preferred over undisturbed longleaf pine habitats. Habitat selection varies seasonally. From December to April, eastern indigo snakes prefer sandhill habitats; from May to July, the snakes shift from winter dens to summer territories; from August through November, they are located more frequently in shady creek bottoms than during other seasons. In a study in Georgia, winter sightings generally occurred on sandhills, in association with gopher tortoise (Gopherus polyphemus) burrows. These burrows can be used as cover from predators, fires, or extreme temperatures that may come through the area. In these sandhill environments, foraging, nesting, ecdysis, and potentially mating occur at or in these burrows.

The eastern indigo snake is most abundant in the sandhill plant communities of Florida and Georgia. These communities are primarily scrub oak-longleaf pine (Pinus palustris) with occasional live oak (Quercus virginiana), laurel oak (Q. laurifolia), Chapman's oak (Q. chapmanii), and myrtle oak (Q. myrtifolia). Other communities include longleaf pine-turkey oak (Q. laevis), slash pine-scrub oak (Pinus elliottii), pine flatwoods, and pine-mesic hardwoods.

== Cover requirements ==
Because the cover requirements of the eastern indigo snake change seasonally, maintaining corridors that link the different habitats used is important. From the spring through fall, snakes must be able to travel from sandhill communities and upland pine-hardwood communities to creek bottoms and agricultural fields. In winter, the eastern indigo snake dens in gopher tortoise burrows, which are usually found in open pine forests with dense herbaceous understories. These gopher tortoise burrows are used for nesting, foraging, and shelter before the snakes shed. Burrows need to be in areas with no flooding. The eastern indigo snake heavily uses debris piles left from site-preparation operations on tree plantations. These piles are often destroyed for cosmetic reasons, but should be left intact because they provide important cover for both the snake and its prey. Summer home ranges for the eastern indigo snake can be as large as 273 acres (110 hectares).

== Food habits and behavior ==
The eastern indigo snake is carnivorous, like all snakes, and consumes any other small animal it can overpower. It has been known to kill some of its prey by pressing the prey against nearby burrow walls. They will stick their heads into stump holes or burrows, patrolling fringes of wetlands, or potentially climbing after prey. Captive specimens are frequently fed dead items to prevent injury to the snake from this violent method of subduing its prey. Chemosensory studies with mice (Mus musculus) have shown that D. couperi responds with significantly elevated rates of tongue flicking and investigation towards visual cues of prey, and not volatile chemical cues. They are diurnal, terrestrial snakes that are regarded as wide-ranging, active foragers. Its diet has been known to include other snakes (ophiophagy), including venomous ones, as it is immune to the venom of the North American rattlesnakes. The eastern indigo snake also eats slugs, turtles, lizards, frogs, toads, fish, a variety of small birds and mammals, and eggs.

As defensive behavior, the eastern indigo snake vertically flattens its neck, hisses, and vibrates its tail. If picked up, it seldom bites.

It often cohabits with gopher tortoises in their burrows, although it will settle for armadillo holes, hollow logs, and debris piles when gopher tortoise burrows cannot be found. Hunters, hoping to flush out rattlesnakes, often accidentally kill indigo snakes when they illegally pour gasoline into the burrows of gopher tortoises (a practice referred to as "gassing"), even though the tortoises themselves are endangered and protected.

== Predators ==
As an apex predator, the eastern indigo snake has few natural predators. Instead, humans represent the biggest threat. Highway fatalities, wanton killings, and over-collection for the pet trade adversely affect snake populations. Snakes are taken illegally from the wild for the pet trade. The eastern indigo snake is sometimes "gassed" in its burrow by rattlesnake hunters. Along with increasing infrastructure and the pet trade, eastern indigo snake populations are drastically declining due to habitat fragmentation. The eastern indigo snake's decline is correlated with the gopher tortoise's decline as well. since the eastern indigo snake utilizes the gopher tortoise's burrows for brumation.

In Florida, the eastern indigo snake may be eaten by some growth stages of invasive snakes such as the Burmese python, reticulated python, Southern African rock python, Central African rock python, boa constrictor, yellow anaconda, Bolivian anaconda, dark-spotted anaconda, and green anaconda.

== Reproduction ==
The eastern indigo snake is oviparous. Its eggs are 75–100 mm (3–4 in) long by 27–32 millimetres (1–1 1/4 in) wide. The female lays a single clutch of 4–14 eggs from late April through early June. The hatchlings are 600–700 millimetres (23 1/2–27 1/2 in) long. The eastern indigo snake is often referred to as a late maturing colubrid; it usually does not reach maturity until it is 3–5 years old and around 5–6 feet in length. The female eastern indigo snakes has the ability to retain live sperm for long periods, potentially over 4 years. Thus, the female is able to choose when to release the sperm to fertilize the eggs. Mating season is at a peak from November to January but can occur from October through March. This occurs while the snakes are in their sandhill habitats.

=== Captivity and care ===
Due to its generally docile nature and appearance, some people find the eastern indigo snake to be a desirable pet, although its protected status can make owning one, depending on location, illegal without a permit. Only a few states require permits to own an eastern indigo snake, but a federal permit is required to buy one from out of state anywhere in the US. The permit costs $100; information about obtaining one can be found by doing a web search. Most states allow unrestricted in-state sales. To thrive in captivity, this snake requires a larger enclosure than most species do, preferably with something to climb on.

A study by Emily C. Lynch aimed to determine the ideal conditions for Indigo Snakes kept in captivity found that snakes with access to fluorescent light and unchanging behavioral enrichment items had the lowest stress levels and maintained the highest activity levels. Snakes that had rotating enrichment items had higher stress levels than those with unchanging environments. Snakes kept in these conditions took less time to emerge from their hide, spent more time basking, and had lower levels of stress hormones in their feces.

One notable owner of a pet eastern indigo snake was gonzo journalist Hunter S. Thompson during the time he wrote his Hell's Angels book. One evening, about 1966, he left his snake — with a mouse to eat — in a cardboard box in the Random House editor's office, but the mouse gnawed through the box and both animals escaped. The snake was subsequently beaten to death by the night watchman, which still caused Thompson great anguish several years later, and was his justification for sending his — often excessive — room service bills to Random House.
