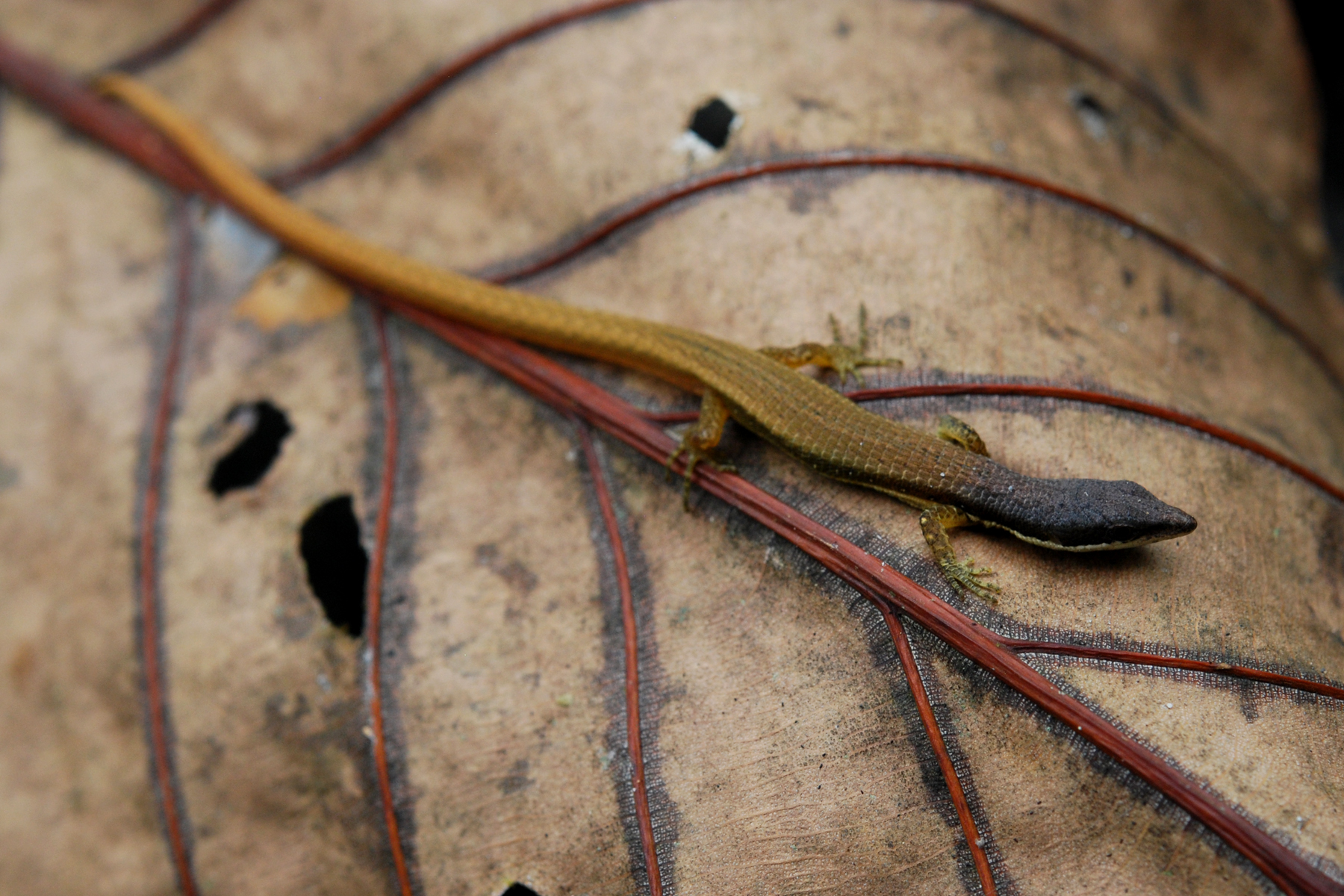
- Cercosaura oshaughnessyi

Scientific classification
- Kingdom: Animalia
- Phylum: Chordata
- Class: Reptilia
- Order: Squamata
- Family: Gymnophthalmidae
- Tribe: Cercosaurini
- Genus: Cercosaura; Wagler, 1830

= Cercosaura =

Genus of lizards

Cercosaura is a genus of lizards in the family Gymnophthalmidae. The genus is endemic to South America.

== Taxonomy ==
The genus Cercosaura includes 18 species according to studies that transfer species from the two genera Pantodactylus and Prionodactylus to this genus.

=== Species ===
The genus Cercosaura contains the following recognized species:

- Cercosaura anomala L. Müller, 1923 – anomalous cercosaura
- Cercosaura anordosquama Sturaro, Rodrigues, Colli, Knowles & Avila-Pires, 2018
- Cercosaura argulus W. Peters, 1863 – elegant eyed lizard, white-lipped prionodactylus
- Cercosaura bassleri Ruibal, 1952 – ocellated tegu
- Cercosaura doanae Echevarría, Barboza & Venegas, 2015
- Cercosaura eigenmanni (Griffin, 1917) – Eigenmann's prionodactylus
- Cercosaura hypnoides Doan & Lamar, 2012
- Cercosaura manicata O'Shaughnessy, 1881 – slender prionodactylus
- Cercosaura nigroventris (Gorzula & Señaris, 1999)
- Cercosaura ocellata Wagler, 1830 – ocellated tegu
- Cercosaura olivacea Gray, 1845 – olive tegu
- Cercosaura oshaughnessyi (Boulenger, 1885) – white-striped eyed lizard
- Cercosaura pacha Mamani, Chaparro, Correa, Alarcón, Salas & Catenazzi, 2020
- Cercosaura parkeri (Ruibal, 1952) – Parker's many-fingered teiid
- Cercosaura phelpsorum (Lancini, 1968)
- Cercosaura quadrilineata Boettger, 1876 – lined many-fingered teiid
- Cercosaura schreibersii Wiegmann, 1834 – Schreibers' many-fingered teiid, long-tailed little lizard
- Cercosaura steyeri (Tedesco, 1998)

Nota bene: A binomial authority in parentheses indicates that the species was originally described in a genus other than Cercosaura.
