= Abdem Ramón Lancini Villalaz =

Venezuelan herpetologist (1934–2007)

Abdem Ramon Lancini-Villalaz
- Born: August 28, 1934; Caracas, Venezuela
- Died: November 10, 2007 (aged 73); Caracas, Venezuela
- Education: Instituto Butantan, Instituto Brasileiro de Geografia e Estatística, Museu Nacional
- Known for: Study of snakes in Venezuela, Serpientes de Venezuela
- Scientific career
- Fields: Herpetology
- Workplaces: Museo de Ciencias Naturales, Instituto de Zoologia Tropical
- Author abbrev. (zoology): Lancini

Abdem Ramon Lancini-Villalaz (August 28, 1934 – November 10, 2007), also cited as Abdem R. Lancini, was a Venezuelan herpetologist who specialized in snakes.

== Biography ==
Lancini completed his schooling in Caracas. At the age of 17, he joined a group of students who demonstrated for democracy and human rights against the junta that came to power in 1948 through a military-led coup d'état. He was arrested and taken to a secret concentration camp on the island of Guasina in the Orinoco Delta, where he spent seven years as a political prisoner. During this time, he discovered his interest in reptiles and collected various specimens while making extensive notes and drawings in a notebook.

After the government changed in January 1958, leading to the first free elections, he was released from Guasina and returned to Caracas. There he soon joined the zoology department of the Museo de Ciencias Naturales (MCN). That same year, he went to the snake laboratory at the Instituto Butantan in São Paulo, Brazil, where he trained under the ophiologists Alphonse Richard Hoge and Hélio E. Belluomini. He then took courses in physical geography, phytogeography, and climatology at the Instituto Brasileiro de Geografia e Estatística (1959) and studied arachnids and snakes at the Museu Nacional da Universidade Federal do Rio de Janeiro (1960), both in Rio de Janeiro.

In 1962, Lancini became curator of herpetology at MCN, succeeding Agustín Fernández-Yépez, an ichthyologist at the museum, and Janis A. Roze, a Latvian immigrant and professor at the Universidad Central de Venezuela, who had informally curated the collection. The same year, he also became director of MCN, a position he held for 29 years until his retirement in 1991. From 1966, he also served as professor at the Instituto de Zoologia Tropical of the Universidad Central de Venezuela. Lancini died on 10 November 2007 in Caracas.

He authored nearly 40 works on reptiles and amphibians (1959–1986) and three books. Most of his works focused on taxonomy and distribution and included overviews of collections throughout the country. He described eight new reptile species, all but one from Venezuela. These included five lizard species – three dwarf tegu species from the genera Anadia and Euspondylus (now Cercosaura), the gecko Phyllodactylus dixoni, and the blind snake Amphisbaena rozei. His new snakes included two colubrid species (genera Atractus and Helicops) and the Peruvian coral snake Micrurus putumayensis. His only amphibian publication concerned the aquatic caecilian Chthonerpeton haydee (now Typhlonectes natans). A large collection of this species allowed him to describe variations and ecology.

Lancini's most significant contribution to herpetology was his illustrated volume on snakes, Serpientes de Venezuela (1979). The book covers 130 species in seven families. A second, unrevised edition appeared in 1986. The German edition, Die Schlangen von Venezuela, was published in 1989 but is not a direct translation. Paul M. Kornacker from the Bundesamt für Naturschutz in Bonn revised the book (adding 14 species and a new family for Venezuela) and included distribution maps, a bibliography, and new text marked with Lancini's initials. The German edition contains 65 drawings of snake heads by Ursula Euler, also from Bonn.

In addition to herpetology, Lancini had a special interest in Alexander von Humboldt, the Prussian naturalist who traveled in Venezuela from July 1799 to November 1800 with his colleague, the French botanist Aimé Bonpland. Lancini retraced Humboldt’s historical route to verify his observations. As a result, he wrote more than a dozen publications on Humboldt, largely unknown in herpetological circles. Posthumously, in 2009, his book on Humboldt in Venezuela, Alejandro de Humboldt El Viajero del Orinoco, was published.

== Eponymous taxa ==
The frog species Pristimantis lancinii and the colubrid snake Atractus lancinii are named after Lancini.
