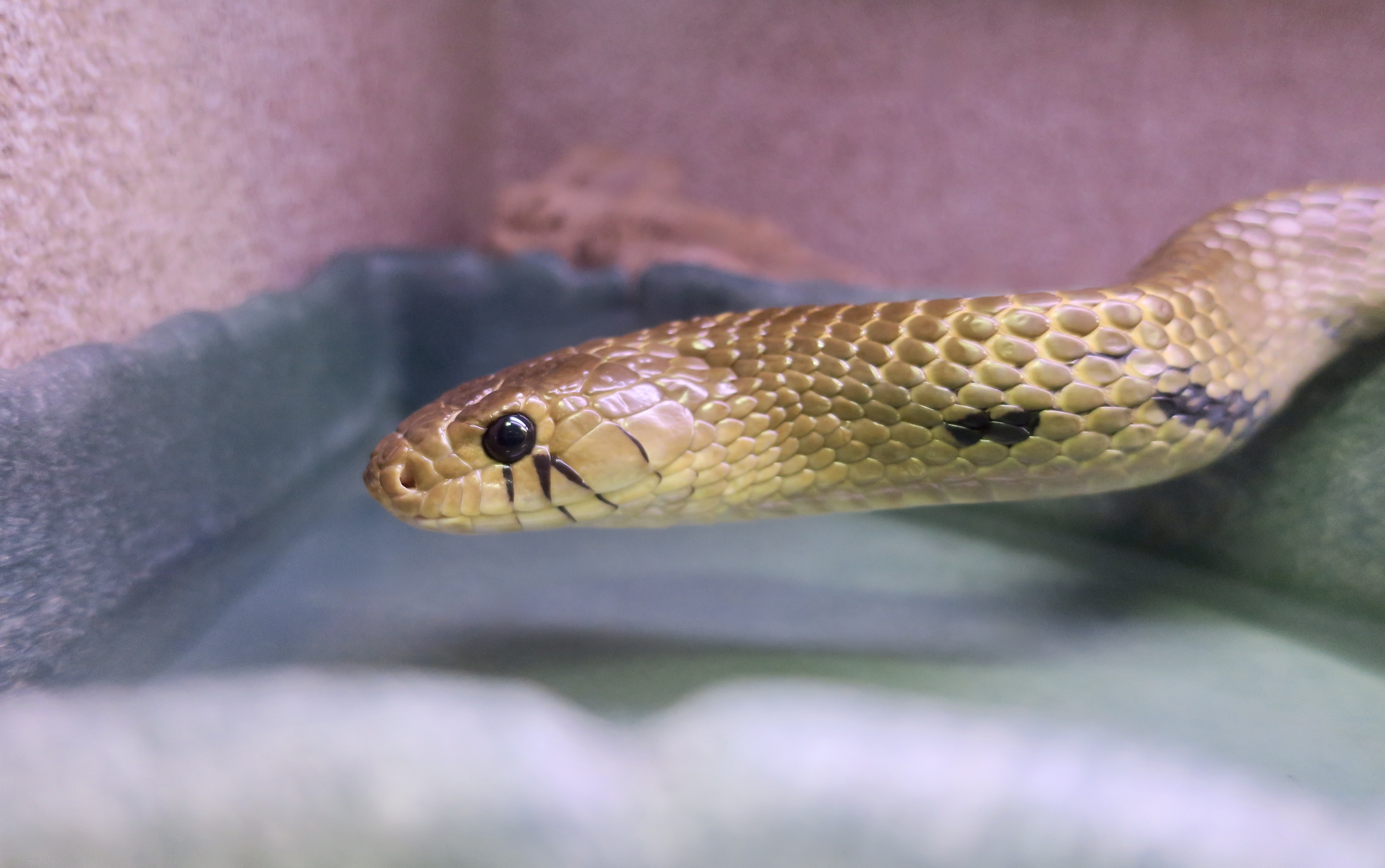

Scientific classification
- Kingdom: Animalia
- Phylum: Chordata
- Class: Reptilia
- Order: Squamata
- Suborder: Serpentes
- Family: Colubridae
- Genus: Drymarchon
- Species: D. melanurus
- Subspecies: D. m. unicolor

Trinomial name
- Drymarchon melanurus unicolor H.M. Smith, 1941

= Unicolor cribo =

Subspecies of snake

The unicolor cribo (Drymarchon melanurus unicolor) is a Central American subspecies of the cribo snakes. Until recently, the unicolor cribo was considered a subspecies of the indigo snake Drymarchon corais unicolor.

Unlike the indigo snake, which is dark blue to almost black, the unicolor cribo has a yellow or golden color with black facial and neck bar-like markings.

This snake reaches a length over 9 ft (2.7 m). It is terrestrial and diurnal, and is found in marshes, swamps, and riverbeds. The unicolor cribo is nonvenomous; it bites its prey without coiling around it. Instead, it pins its prey, crushing it, and then swallows it whole. Typical prey consists of other snakes, including venomous snakes, small mammals, small birds, lizards, frogs, fish, and other small vertebrate animals.
