= Cercosaura olivacea =

Scientific classification
- Kingdom: Animalia
- Phylum: Chordata
- Order: Squamata
- Family: Gymnophthalmidae
- Genus: Cercosaura
- Species: C. olivacea

Binomial name
- Cercosaura olivacea Gray, 1845

Species of lizard

Cercosaura olivacea, the olive tegu, is a species of lizard in the family Gymnophthalmidae. It is found in Brazil and Argentina.
