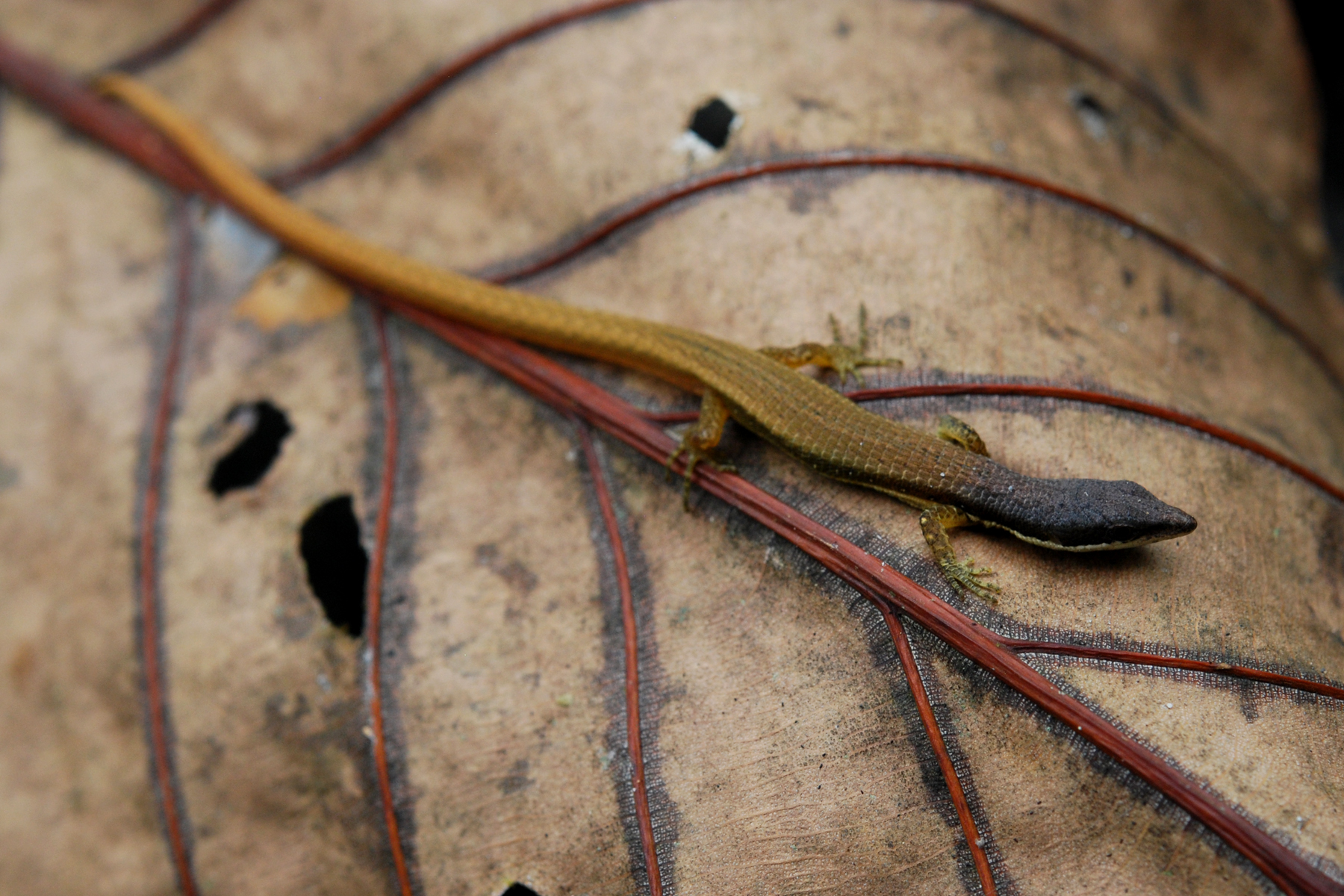

Scientific classification
- Kingdom: Animalia
- Phylum: Chordata
- Class: Reptilia
- Order: Squamata
- Family: Gymnophthalmidae
- Genus: Cercosaura
- Species: C. oshaughnessyi

Binomial name
- Cercosaura oshaughnessyi (Boulenger, 1885)

Synonyms
- Prionodactylus oshaughnessyi Boulenger, 885; Euspondylus oshaughnessyi — Cunha, 1961; Prionodactylus oshaughnessyi — Vanzolini, 1972; Cercosaura oshaughnessyi — Torres-Carvajal et al., 2015

= Cercosaura oshaughnessyi =

Species of lizard

Cercosaura oshaughnessyi, also known commonly as the white-striped eyed lizard and lagarto-da-terra in Brazilian Portuguese, is a species of lizard in the family Gymnophthalmidae. The species is native to northern South America.

== Etymology ==
The specific name, oshaughnessyi, is in honor of Arthur O'Shaughnessy, who was a British herpetologist and poet.

== Geographic distribution ==
Cercosaura oshaughnessyi is found in Brazil (Acre, Amapá, western Amazonas), Colombia, Ecuador, French Guiana, and northern Peru.

== Reproduction ==
Cercosaura oshaughnessyi is oviparous.
