= Cercosaura steyeri =

Conservation status
- Data Deficient (IUCN 3.1)

Scientific classification
- Kingdom: Animalia
- Phylum: Chordata
- Class: Reptilia
- Order: Squamata
- Family: Gymnophthalmidae
- Genus: Cercosaura
- Species: C. steyeri

Binomial name
- Cercosaura steyeri (Tedesco, 1998)

Synonyms
- Pantodactylus steyeri Tedesco, 1998; Cercosaura steyeri — Bérnils et al., 2007

Species of lizard

Cercosaura steyeri is a species of lizard in the family Gymnophthalmidae. The species is endemic to Argentina.

== Etymology ==
The specific name, steyeri, is in honor of Brazilian herpetologist Ligia Steyer Krause.

== Geographic range ==
C. steyeri is found in Mercedes Department, Corrientes Province, Argentina.

== Habitat ==
The preferred habitat of C. steyeri is savanna, at altitudes of 0–100 m (0–328 ft)

== Reproduction ==
C. steyeri is oviparous.
