= Cercosaura pacha =

Scientific classification
- Kingdom: Animalia
- Phylum: Chordata
- Class: Reptilia
- Order: Squamata
- Family: Gymnophthalmidae
- Genus: Cercosaura
- Species: C. pacha

Binomial name
- Cercosaura pacha Mamani, Chaparro, Correa, Alarcón, Salas, & Catenazzi. 2020

Species of lizard

Cercosaura pacha is a species of lizard in the family Gymnophthalmidae. It is endemic to Peru.
