= Cercosaura hypnoides =

Conservation status
- Data Deficient (IUCN 3.1)

Scientific classification
- Kingdom: Animalia
- Phylum: Chordata
- Class: Reptilia
- Order: Squamata
- Family: Gymnophthalmidae
- Genus: Cercosaura
- Species: C. hypnoides

Binomial name
- Cercosaura hypnoides Doan & Lamar, 2012

Species of lizard

Cercosaura hypnoides is a species of lizard in the family Gymnophthalmidae. It is endemic to Colombia.
