= Cercosaura anordosquama =

Scientific classification
- Kingdom: Animalia
- Phylum: Chordata
- Class: Reptilia
- Order: Squamata
- Family: Gymnophthalmidae
- Genus: Cercosaura
- Species: C. anordosquama

Binomial name
- Cercosaura anordosquama Sturaro, Rodrigues, Colli, Knowles, & Avila-Pires, 2018

Species of lizard

Cercosaura anordosquama is a species of lizard in the family Gymnophthalmidae. It is endemic to Brazil.
