= Cercosaura anomala =

Conservation status
- Data Deficient (IUCN 3.1)

Scientific classification
- Kingdom: Animalia
- Phylum: Chordata
- Class: Reptilia
- Order: Squamata
- Family: Gymnophthalmidae
- Genus: Cercosaura
- Species: C. anomala

Binomial name
- Cercosaura anomala Müller, 1923

Species of lizard

Cercosaura anomala, the strange pholiodobolus, is a species of lizard in the family Gymnophthalmidae. It is endemic to Peru.
