= Cercosaura nigroventris =

Conservation status
- Least Concern (IUCN 3.1)

Scientific classification
- Kingdom: Animalia
- Phylum: Chordata
- Class: Reptilia
- Order: Squamata
- Family: Gymnophthalmidae
- Genus: Cercosaura
- Species: C. nigroventris

Binomial name
- Cercosaura nigroventris (Gorzula & Señaris, 1999)

Species of lizard

Cercosaura nigroventris is a species of lizard in the family Gymnophthalmidae. It is endemic to Venezuela.
