= Micrurus putumayensis =

Conservation status
- Least Concern (IUCN 3.1)

Scientific classification
- Kingdom: Animalia
- Phylum: Chordata
- Class: Reptilia
- Order: Squamata
- Suborder: Serpentes
- Family: Elapidae
- Genus: Micrurus
- Species: M. putumayensis

Binomial name
- Micrurus putumayensis Lancini, 1962
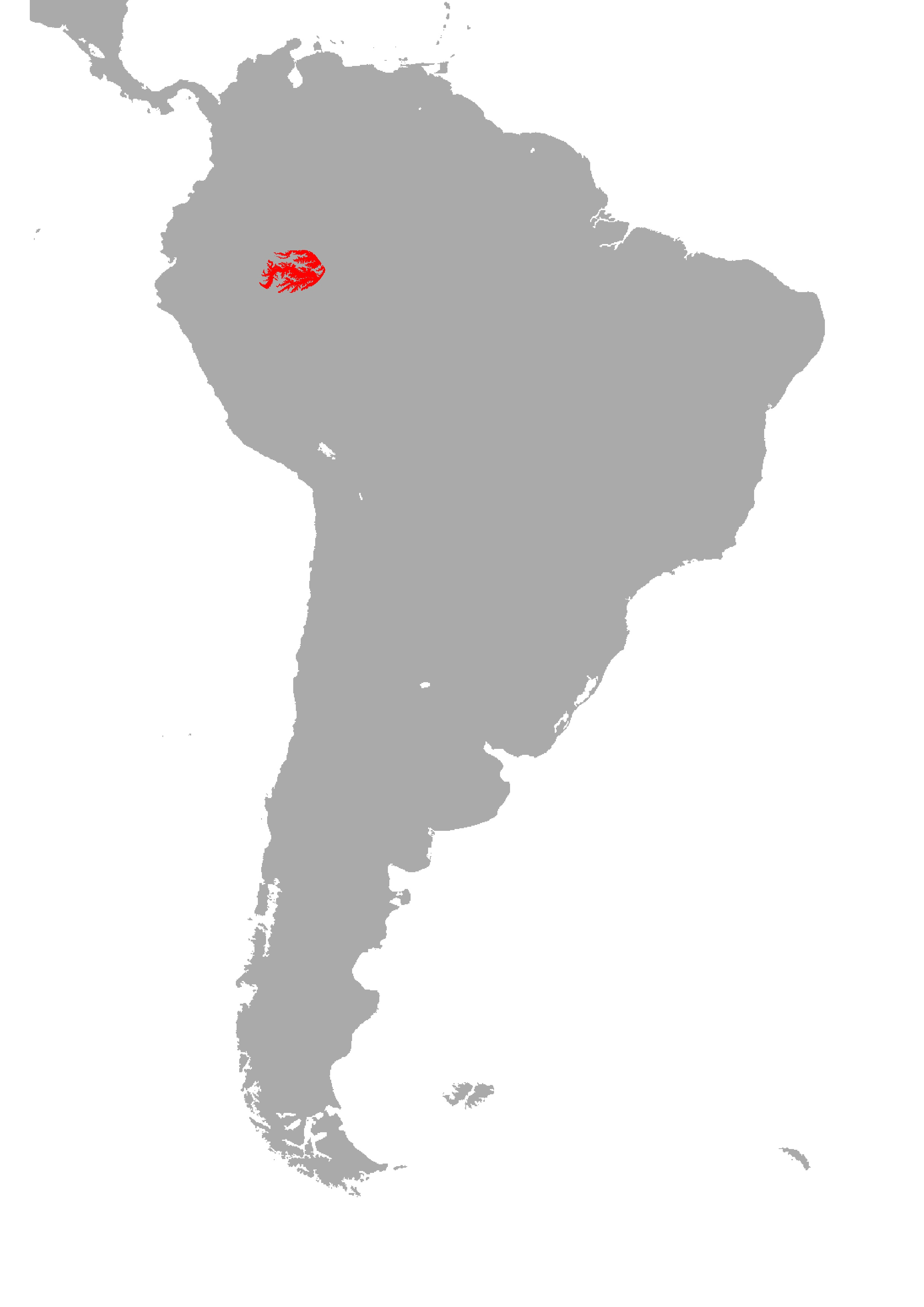

Synonyms
- Micrurus schmidti Lancini, 1962

Species of snake

Micrurus putumayensis, also known commonly as the Putumayo coral snake, cobra coral do Putumayo in Brazilian Portuguese, and coral putumayense in South American Spanish, is a species of venomous snake in the family Elapidae. The species is native to northwestern South America.

== Description ==
Unlike most New World coral snakes which are tricolored, Micrurus putumayensis is bicolored. Its color pattern consists of alternating rings of only black and yellow. There are no red rings present. Both the black rings and the yellow rings are very wide. The black rings are 8–35 dorsal scales and ventral scales wide, and the yellow rings are 4–11 dorsals and ventrals wide. The dorsal scales within the yellow rings are heavily marked with black. The black marking is at the base of each scale, with the tip and edges being yellow, which is the opposite of in other species of Micrurus. Males have 7–11 black rings on the body, and females have 9–14. Males have 2–3 black rings on the tail, and females have two.

Males have 197–208 ventrals and 47–51 subcaudals, and femaless have 216–226 ventrals and 32–35 caudals.

Medium-sized for the genus Micrurus, adults of M. putumayensis usually have a total length (tail included) of approximately 70 cm (28 in). The maximum recorded total length is 80.5 cm (31.7 in).

== Geographic distribution ==
Micrurus putumayensis is found in northwestern Brazil, southeastern Colombia, and northeastern Peru.

== Habitat ==
The preferred natural habitat of Micrurus putumayensis is forest in the northwestern Amazon basin, at elevations of 60–120 m (200–390 ft).

== Behavior ==
Micrurus putumayensis is terrestrial and diurnal.

== Diet ==
Micrurus putumayensis preys on nonvenomous snakes of the family Colubridae.

== Reproduction ==
Micrurus putumayensis is oviparous.

== Taxonomy ==
This species was originally described in early 1962 as a species new to science by Venezuelan herpetologist Abdem R. Lancini. At that time he gave it the scientific name Micrurus schmidti. Unfortunately, that name was preoccupied by Micrurus schmidti Dunn, 1940. To resolve this conflict, Lancini published a second scientific paper, later in 1962, in which he coined the replacement name Micrurus putumayensis. Dunn's Micrurus schmidti is a synonym of Micrurus stewarti Barbour & Amaral, 1928.
