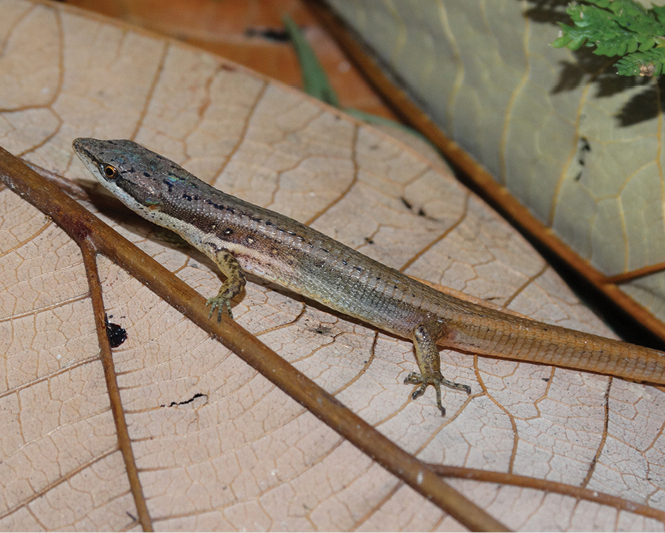
- Maranhão, Brazil

Conservation status
- Least Concern (IUCN 3.1)

Scientific classification
- Domain: Eukaryota
- Kingdom: Animalia
- Phylum: Chordata
- Class: Reptilia
- Order: Squamata
- Family: Gymnophthalmidae
- Genus: Cercosaura
- Species: C. argulus

Binomial name
- Cercosaura argulus Peters, 1862

= Cercosaura argulus =

Species of lizard

Cercosaura argulus, the elegant eyed lizard or white-lipped prionodactylus is a species of lizard in the family Gymnophthalmidae. It is found in Colombia, Ecuador, Bolivia, French Guiana, Peru, and Brazil.
