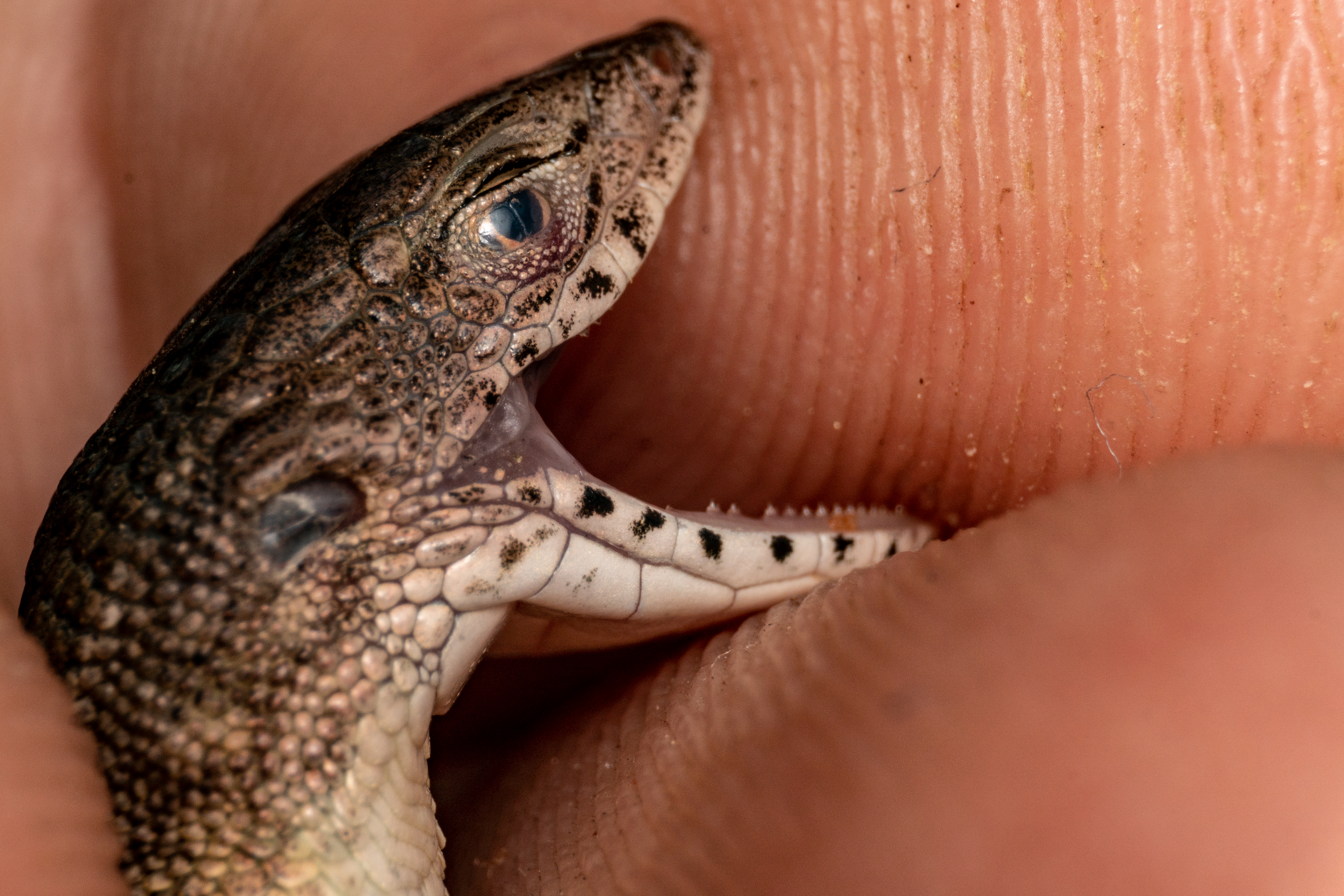

Conservation status
- Least Concern (IUCN 3.1)

Scientific classification
- Kingdom: Animalia
- Phylum: Chordata
- Class: Reptilia
- Order: Squamata
- Family: Gymnophthalmidae
- Genus: Cercosaura
- Species: C. schreibersii

Binomial name
- Cercosaura schreibersii Wiegmann, 1834

Synonyms
- Cercosaura schreibersii Wiegmann, 1834; Pantodactylus schreibersii — Boulenger, 1885; Cercosaura schreibersii — Bauer & R. Günther, 1994

= Cercosaura schreibersii =

Species of lizard

Cercosaura schreibersii, known commonly as Schreibers's many-fingered teiid or the long-tailed little lizard, is a species of lizard in the family Gymnophthalmidae. The species is endemic to South America.

== Etymology ==
The specific name, schreibersii, is in honor of Austrian naturalist Carl Franz Anton Ritter von Schreibers.

== Geographic range ==
C. schreibersii is found in Argentina, Bolivia, Brazil, Paraguay, and Uruguay.

== Habitat ==
The preferred natural habitats of C. schreibersii are forest, savanna, shrubland, and grassland.

== Subspecies ==
Two subspecies are recognized as being valid, including the nominotypical subspecies.

- Cercosaura schreibersii albostrigatus (Griffin, 1917)
- Cercosaura schreibersii schreibersii Wiegmann, 1834

Nota bene: A trinomial authority in parentheses indicates that the subspecies was originally described in a genus other than Cercosaura.

== Reproduction ==
C. schreibersii is oviparous.
