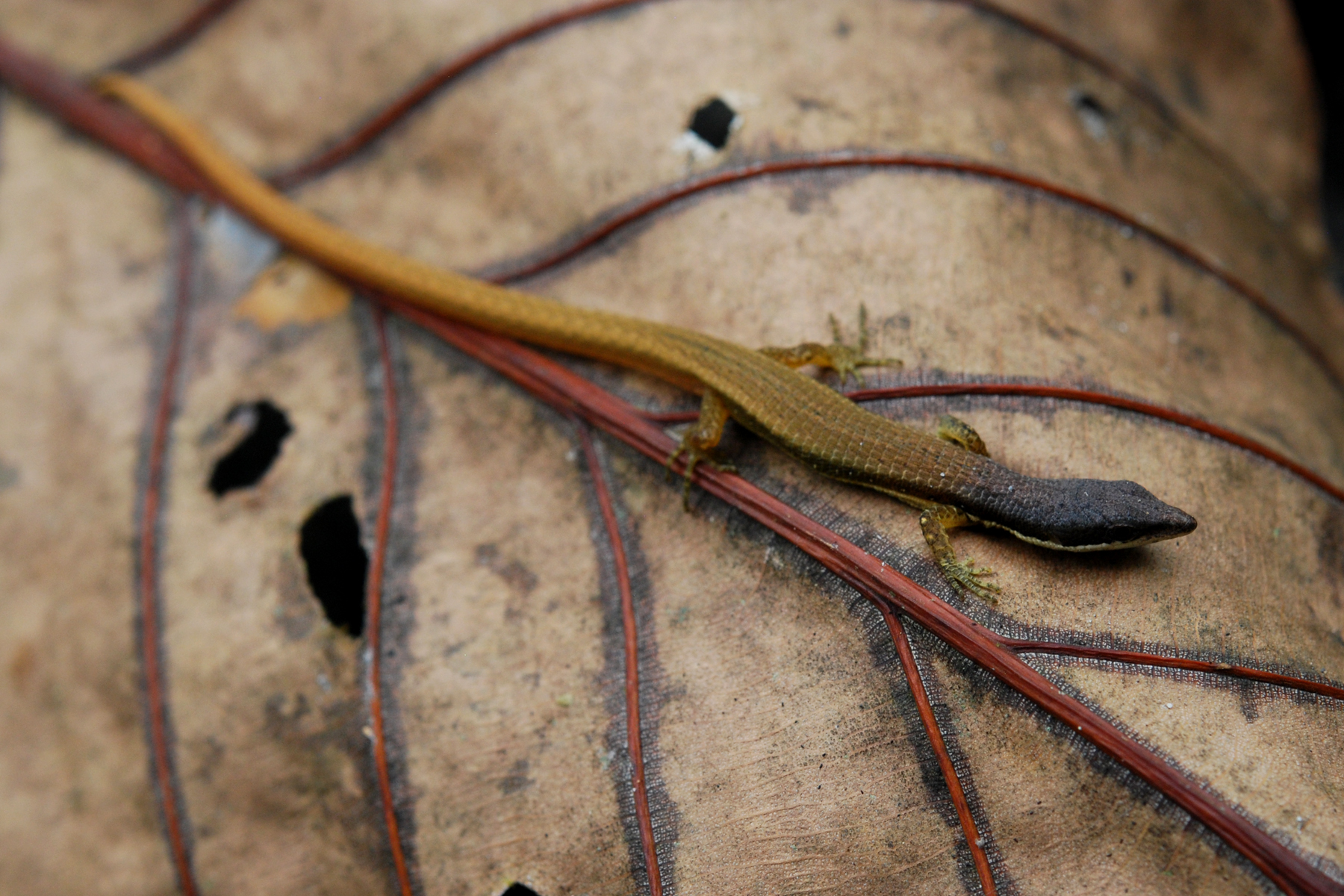
- Prionodactylus oshaughnessyi

Scientific classification
- Kingdom: Animalia
- Phylum: Chordata
- Class: Reptilia
- Order: Squamata
- Family: Gymnophthalmidae
- Genus: Prionodactylus; O'Shaughnessy, 1881

= Prionodactylus =

Genus of lizards

Prionodactylus is a former genus of lizards in the family Gymnophthalmidae. Species that at least at some point have been placed in the genus are reassigned to Arthrosaura, Cercosaura, Echinosaura, Pholidobolus, Placosoma, Proctoporus, Ptychoglossus, and Riolama.
