= Cercosaura quadrilineata =

Conservation status
- Least Concern (IUCN 3.1)

Scientific classification
- Kingdom: Animalia
- Phylum: Chordata
- Class: Reptilia
- Order: Squamata
- Suborder: Lacertoidea
- Family: Gymnophthalmidae
- Genus: Cercosaura
- Species: C. quadrilineata

Binomial name
- Cercosaura quadrilineata Boettger, 1876

Species of lizard

Cercosaura quadrilineata, the lined many-fingered teiid, is a species of lizard in the family Gymnophthalmidae. It is endemic to Brazil.
