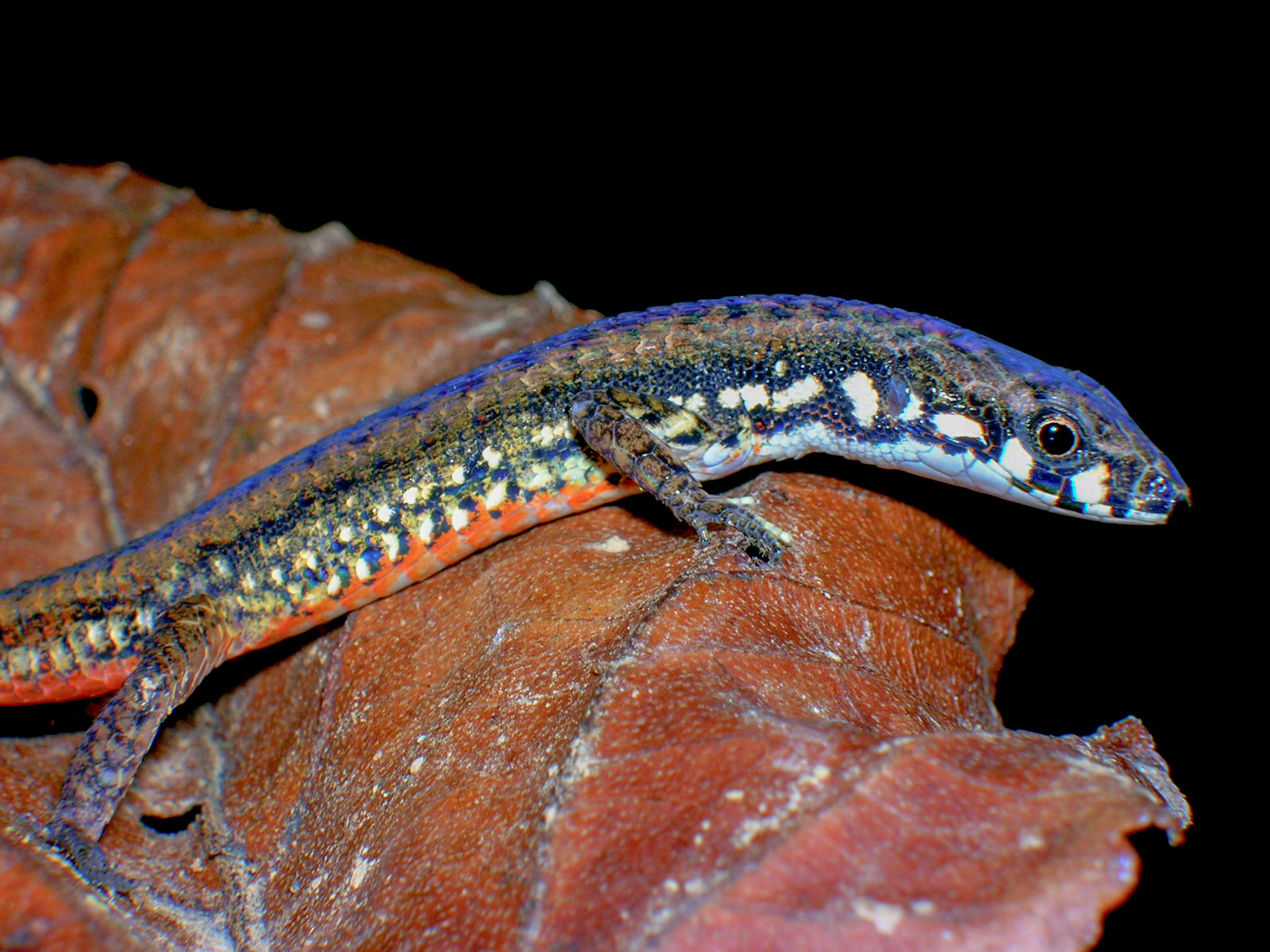
- In Peru

Conservation status
- Least Concern (IUCN 3.1)

Scientific classification
- Kingdom: Animalia
- Phylum: Chordata
- Class: Reptilia
- Order: Squamata
- Family: Gymnophthalmidae
- Genus: Cercosaura
- Species: C. eigenmanni

Binomial name
- Cercosaura eigenmanni (Griffin, 1917)

Synonyms
- Prionodactylus eigenmanni Griffin, 1917; Cercosaura eigenmanni — Doan, 2003

= Cercosaura eigenmanni =

Species of lizard

Cercosaura eigenmanni, known commonly as Eigenmann's prionodactylus, is a species of lizard in the family Gymnophthalmidae. The species is endemic to South America.

== Discovery ==
C. eigenmanni was discovered in 1917 by L.E. Griffin.

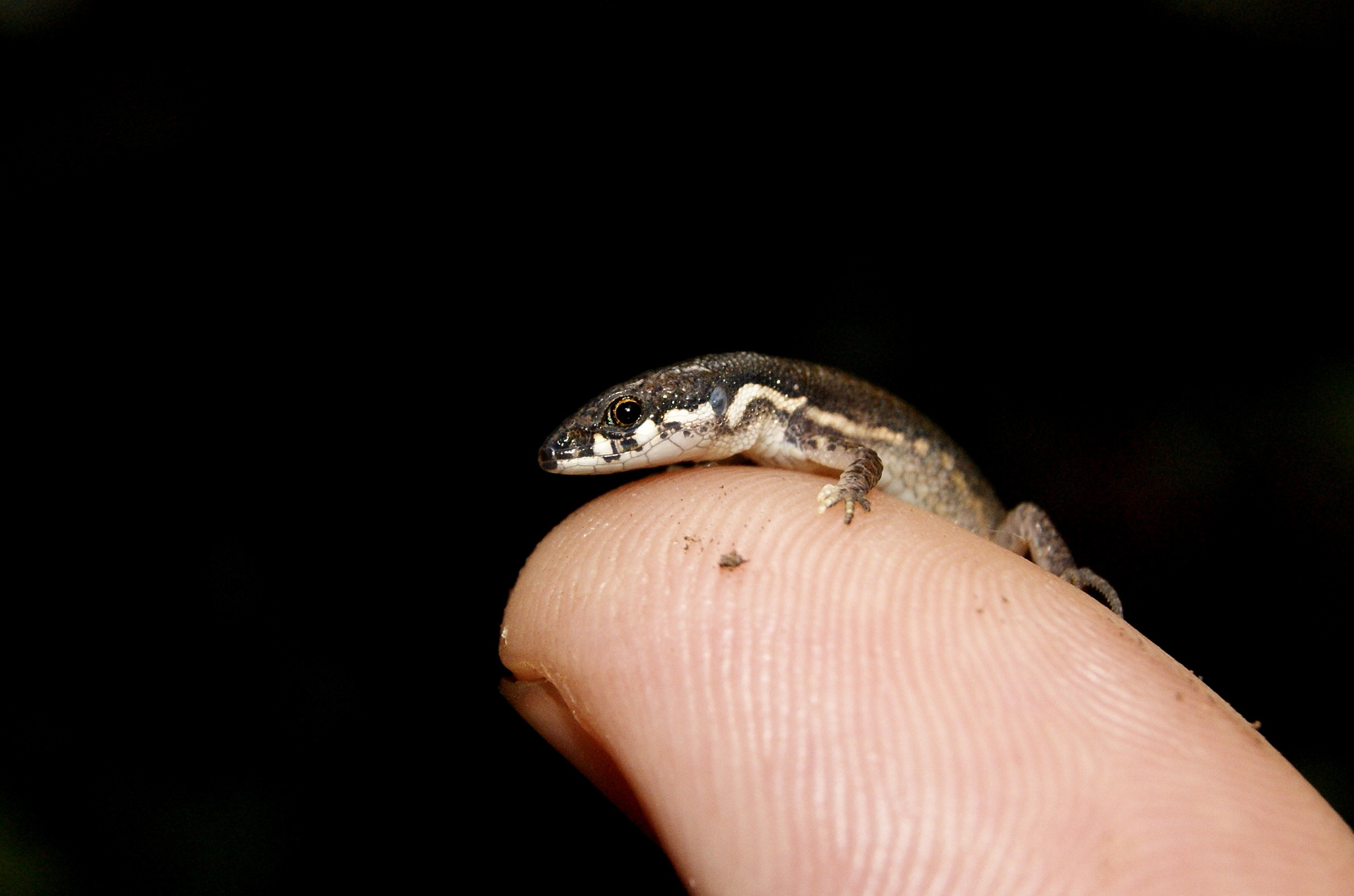
Mato Grosso, Brazil

== Description ==
Adults of C. eigenmanni may attain a snout-to-vent length of about 4.5 cm (1.8 in).

== Etymology ==
The specific name, eigenmanni, is in honor of German-born American ichthyologist Carl H. Eigenmann.

== Geographic range ==
C. eigenmanni is found in Bolivia, Brazil (namely the states of Rondônia, Amazonas and Mato Grosso), and Peru.

== Habitat ==
The preferred habitat of C. eigenmanni is forest at altitudes of 200–700 m (660–2,300 ft).

== Reproduction ==
C. eigenmanni is oviparous.
