= Cercosaura parkeri =

Conservation status
- Least Concern (IUCN 3.1)

Scientific classification
- Kingdom: Animalia
- Phylum: Chordata
- Class: Reptilia
- Order: Squamata
- Family: Gymnophthalmidae
- Genus: Cercosaura
- Species: C. parkeri

Binomial name
- Cercosaura parkeri (Ruibal, 1952)

Synonyms
- Pantodactylus schreibersii parkeri Ruibal, 1952; Pantodactylus parkeri — Tedesco & Cei, 1999; Cercosaura parkeri — Doan, 2003

Species of lizard

Cercosaura parkeri, known commonly as Parker's many-fingered teiid, is a species of lizard in the family Gymnophthalmidae. The species is endemic to South America.

== Etymology ==
The specific name, parkeri, is in honor of English herpetologist Hampton Wildman Parker.

== Description ==
Dorsally, Cercosaura parkeri is uniformly brown. Laterally, it has a white stripe which begins on the upper labials, passes through the lower half of the ear, and continues along the side of the body. This stripe extends at least to above the front leg, and in some specimens to above the hind leg.

== Geographic distribution ==
Cercosaura parkeri is found in Argentina (Catamarca, Jujuy, Salta), Bolivia, Brazil (Mato Grosso, Mato Grosso do Sul, Rondônia), and possibly Peru.

== Habitat ==
The preferred natural habitat of Cercosaura parkeri is forest, but it has also been found in disturbed habitats including urban areas.

== Reproduction ==
Cercosaura parkeri is oviparous.
