= Roze's worm lizard =

Conservation status
- Data Deficient (IUCN 3.1)

Scientific classification
- Kingdom: Animalia
- Phylum: Chordata
- Class: Reptilia
- Order: Squamata
- Clade: Amphisbaenia
- Family: Amphisbaenidae
- Genus: Amphisbaena
- Species: A. rozei

Binomial name
- Amphisbaena rozei Lancini, 1963

Species of lizard

Roze's worm lizard (Amphisbaena rozei) is a species of amphisbaenian in the family Amphisbaenidae. The species is endemic to Venezuela.

== Etymology ==
The specific name, rozei, is in honor of Latvian-born American herpetologist Janis Roze.

== Geographic range ==
A. rozei is found in Bolívar state, Venezuela.

== Habitat ==
The preferred habitat of A. rozei is forest.

== Description ==
A. rozei has four precloacal pores. The dorsal surface of the tail is covered by strong tubercles.

== Reproduction ==
A. rozei is oviparous.
