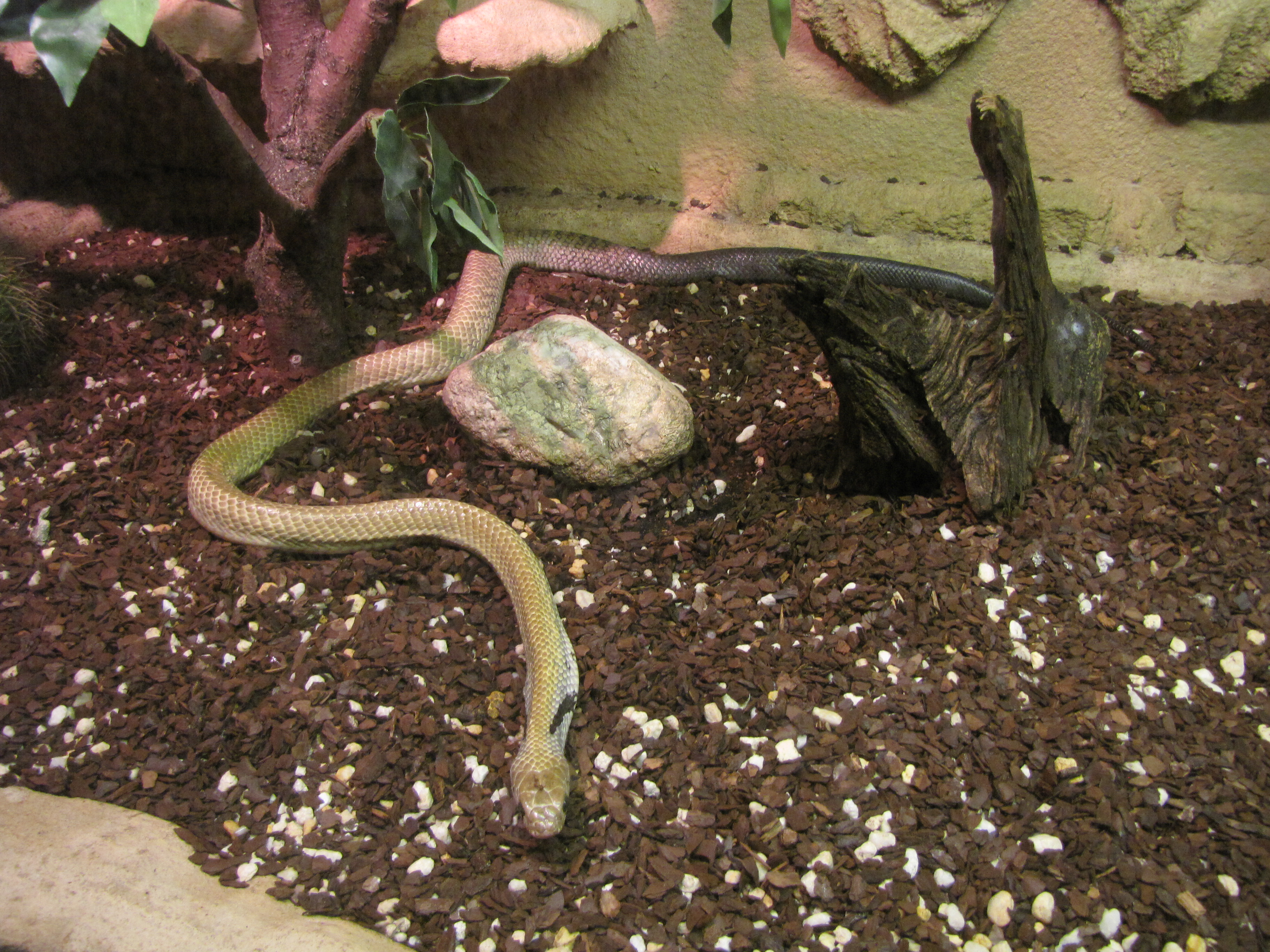
- Drymarchon melanurus
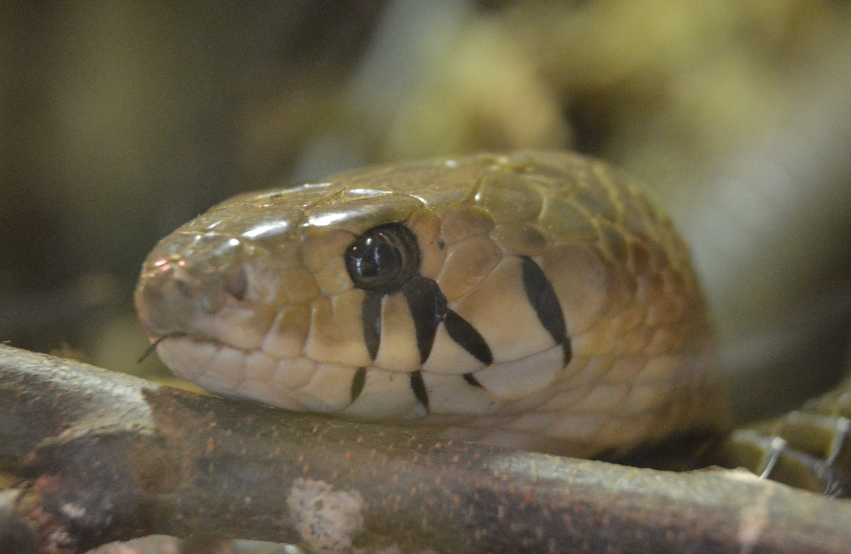

Conservation status
- Least Concern (IUCN 3.1)

Scientific classification
- Kingdom: Animalia
- Phylum: Chordata
- Class: Reptilia
- Order: Squamata
- Suborder: Serpentes
- Family: Colubridae
- Genus: Drymarchon
- Species: D. melanurus

Binomial name
- Drymarchon melanurus (A.M.C. Duméril, Bibron & A.H.A. Duméril, 1854)

Subspecies
- Five, see text.

Synonyms
- Spilotes melanurus A.M.C. Duméril, Bibron & A.H.A. Duméril, 1854; Spilotes corais melanurus — Cope, 1893; Morenoa orizabensis Dugès, 1905; Drymarchon corais melanurus — Amaral, 1929; Drymarchon melanurus — Wüster et al., 2001

= Middle American indigo snake =

Species of snake

The Middle American indigo snake (Drymarchon melanurus), also known commonly as the blacktail cribo, is a species of large, nonvenomous snake in the family Colubridae. The species is native to the Southwestern United States, Mexico, Central America, and northern South America. In addition to the nominate subspecies, it has four other recognized subspecies, including D. m. erebennus, commonly known as the Texas indigo snake.

== Description ==
D. melanurus is a large species that can grow to a total length (including tail) from 1.80 m (6 ft) to over 2.40 m (8 ft). This species has predominantly olive-brown, glossy dorsal scales changing to black at the tail. The underside is a lighter olive-yellow to olive-tan color. D. melanurus has distinctive dark markings around the eyes, with a vertical dark slash just behind the jaw and a heavy diagonal dark slash on both sides of the neck. The subspecies D. m. erebennus is predominantly solid black, though lighter-shaded variations occur.

== Geographic range and habitat ==
The geographic range of D. melanurus extends from southern Texas southwards through the Gulf Coast of Mexico, the Yucatán Peninsula, Guatemala, and Belize. On the Pacific Coast, its range extends from Sinaloa in Mexico, southward to Guatemala, as far south as Colombia, Venezuela, and Ecuador. It is found at elevations from near sea level up to around 1,900 m (6,230 feet) above mean sea level. The subspecies D. m. erebennus is found in South Texas and southwards into Mexico as far as Veracruz.

== Subspecies ==
Five subspecies of D. melanurus are recognized:

- Drymarchon melanurus erebennus (Texas indigo snake) (Cope, 1860)
- D. m. melanurus (black-tailed cribo) (A.M.C. Dumeril, Bibron & A.H.A. Dumeril, 1854)
- D. m. orizabensis (Dugès, 1905)
- D. m. rubidus (Mexican West Coast indigo) H.M. Smith, 1941
- D. m. unicolor (unicolor cribo) H.M. Smith, 1941

Nota bene: A trinomial authority in parentheses indicates that the subspecies was originally described in a genus other than Drymarchon.
