= Cercosaura manicata =

Conservation status
- Least Concern (IUCN 3.1)

Scientific classification
- Kingdom: Animalia
- Phylum: Chordata
- Class: Reptilia
- Order: Squamata
- Family: Gymnophthalmidae
- Genus: Cercosaura
- Species: C. manicata

Binomial name
- Cercosaura manicata O'Shaughnessy, 1881

Species of lizard

Cercosaura manicata, the slender prionodactylus, is a species of lizard in the family Gymnophthalmidae. It is found in Ecuador, Peru, Bolivia, and Colombia.
