= Cercosaura doanae =

Scientific classification
- Kingdom: Animalia
- Phylum: Chordata
- Class: Reptilia
- Order: Squamata
- Family: Gymnophthalmidae
- Genus: Cercosaura
- Species: C. doanae

Binomial name
- Cercosaura doanae Echevarría, Barboza & Venegas, 2015

Species of lizard

Cercosaura doanae is a species of lizard in the family Gymnophthalmidae. The species is endemic to Peru.

== Etymology ==
The specific name, doanae, is in honor of herpetologist Tiffany M. Doan

== Geographic range ==
C. doanae is found in Mariscal Cáceres Province, Department of San Martín, Peru.
