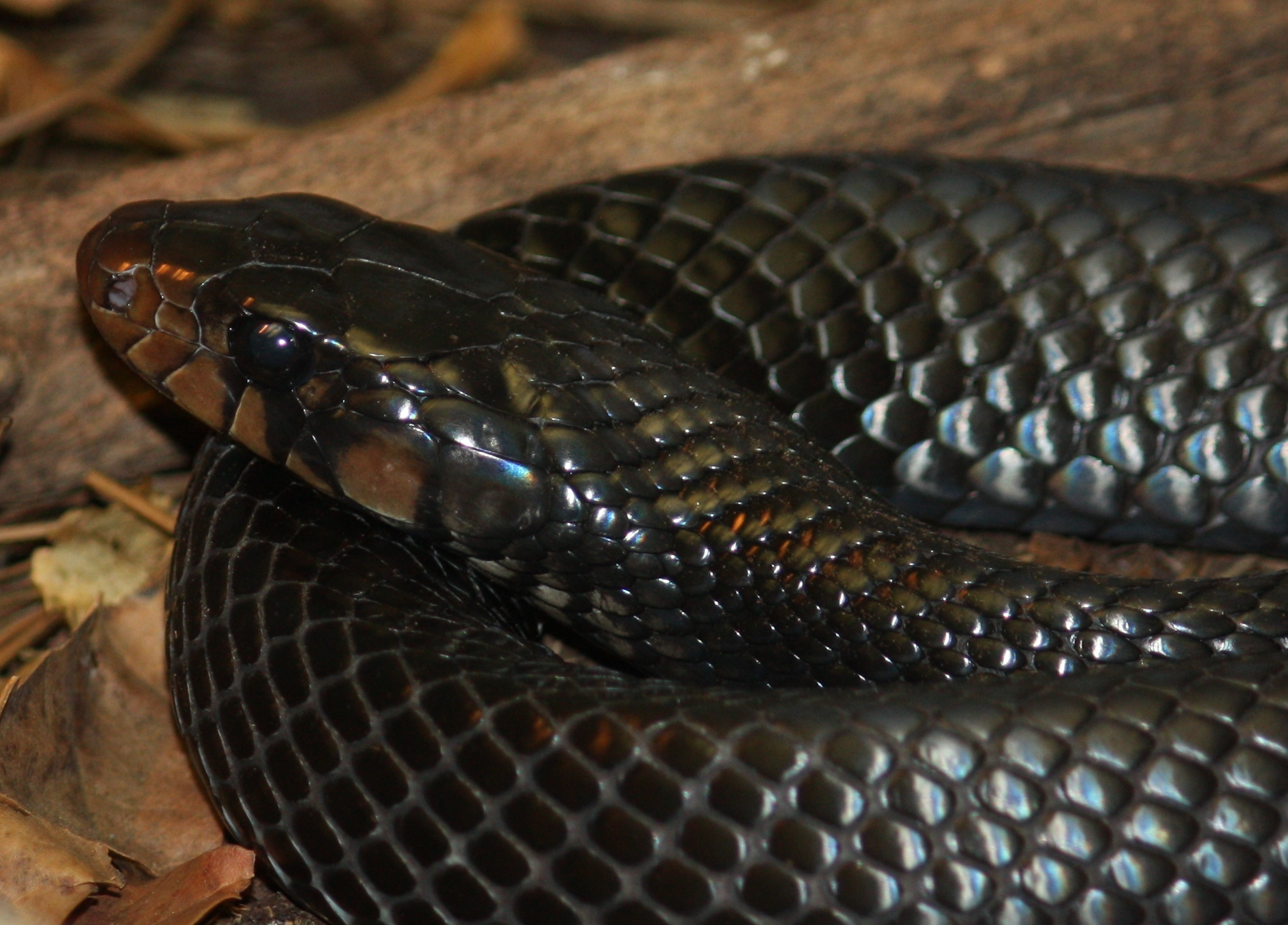
- Drymarchon couperi, eastern indigo snake

Scientific classification
- Kingdom: Animalia
- Phylum: Chordata
- Class: Reptilia
- Order: Squamata
- Suborder: Serpentes
- Family: Colubridae
- Subfamily: Colubrinae
- Genus: Drymarchon; Fitzinger, 1843

Species
- See text

Synonyms
- Georgia Baird and Girard, 1853; Geoptyas Steindachner, 1867; Morenoa Duges, 1905

= Drymarchon =

Genus of snakes

Drymarchon is a genus of large, nonvenomous, colubrid snakes, commonly known as indigo snakes or cribos, found in the Southeastern United States, Mexico, Central America, and South America.

== Description ==
Indigo snakes are large, robust snakes. They have smooth dorsal scales, and several color variations, including a glossy blue-black color. The snake's generic name Drymarchon means "lord of the forest". The species in this genus are sexually dimorphic, with the males being larger than the females. This is thought to be due to intraspecies competition from the males.

== Behavior and diet ==
Indigo snakes are diurnal and actively forage for prey. They feed on a broad variety of small animals such as rodents, birds, lizards, frogs, toads, and other snakes, including rattlesnakes. Indigo snakes also eat small gopher tortoises when they are available. They are not aggressive snakes and bite only when threatened. Its typical threat display includes hissing and shaking of its tail as a warning.

== Habitat ==
The current distribution of D. couperi extends from the coastal plain of southern Georgia to peninsular Florida and the lower Florida Keys west to Southeastern Mississippi. This species uses a variety of different habitats, including longleaf pine-turkey oak sandhills, pine and scrub flatwoods, dry prairie, tropical hardwoods, freshwater wetlands, and coastal dunes; however, winter survival, especially in northern portions of its range, depends on the availability of appropriate shelters, which are primarily gopher tortoise burrows. These burrows are used to hide from predators, fires, and extreme temperatures.

The Texas indigo snake ranges from central-eastern and northeastern Mexico to south and central Texas and lives in Tamaulipan thornscrub habitat.

The Yellow-tailed cribo (or Drymarchon corais) ranges throughout central and northern South America within the Amazon rainforest. They can be found in Brazil, Bolivia, Colombia, Ecuador, French Guiana, Guyana, Paraguay, Peru, Suriname and Venezuela as well as Trinidad and Tobago.

== Threats ==
Populations in Alabama, Texas, and South Carolina have been largely lost due to habitat destruction, poaching, and killings. Indigo snakes are currently protected under the United States Fish and Wildlife Service and the Florida Fish and Wildlife Conservation Commission, which makes possession, harming, or harassing them illegal. Permits are also required to keep or transport this species.

== Species and subspecies ==
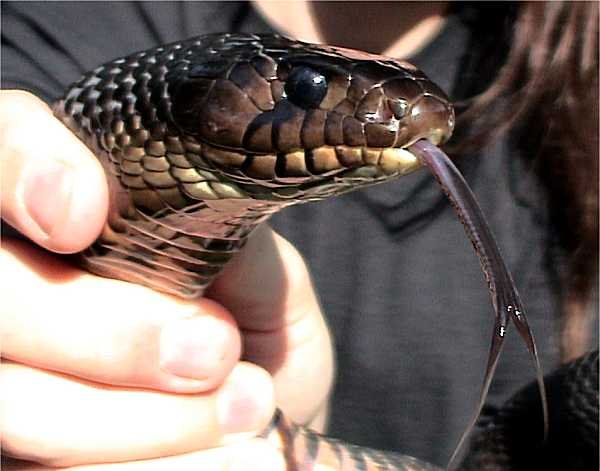
Drymarchon melanurus erebennus

The genus Drymarchon was formerly considered to be a monotypic taxon formed by subspecies of D. corais. Currently, the genus includes six distinct species recognized by ITIS: One of the species has several subspecies that are recognized as being valid.

- Falcon indigo snake — Drymarchon caudomaculatus Wüster, Yrausquin & Mijares-Urrutia, 2001
- Indigo snake — Drymarchon corais (F. Boie, 1827)
- Eastern indigo snake — Drymarchon couperi (Holbrook, 1842)
- Gulf Coast indigo snake — Drymarchon kolpobasileus Krysko, Granatosky, Nuñez & D. J. Smith, 2016
- Margarita indigo snake — Drymarchon margaritae Roze, 1959
- Middle American indigo snake — Drymarchon melanurus (A.M.C. Duméril, Bibron & A.H.A. Duméril, 1854)
  - Black-tailed cribo — D. m. melanurus (A.M.C. Duméril, Bibron & A.H.A. Duméril, 1854)
  - Texas indigo snake — D. m. erebennus (Cope, 1860)
  - Orizaba indigo snake — D. m. orizabensis (Dugès, 1905)
  - Mexican red-tailed indigo snake — D. m. rubidus H.M. Smith, 1941
  - Unicolor cribo — D. m. unicolor H.M. Smith, 1941

Nota bene: A binomial authority or a trinomial authority in parentheses indicates that the species or subspecies was originally described in a genus other than Drymarchon.
