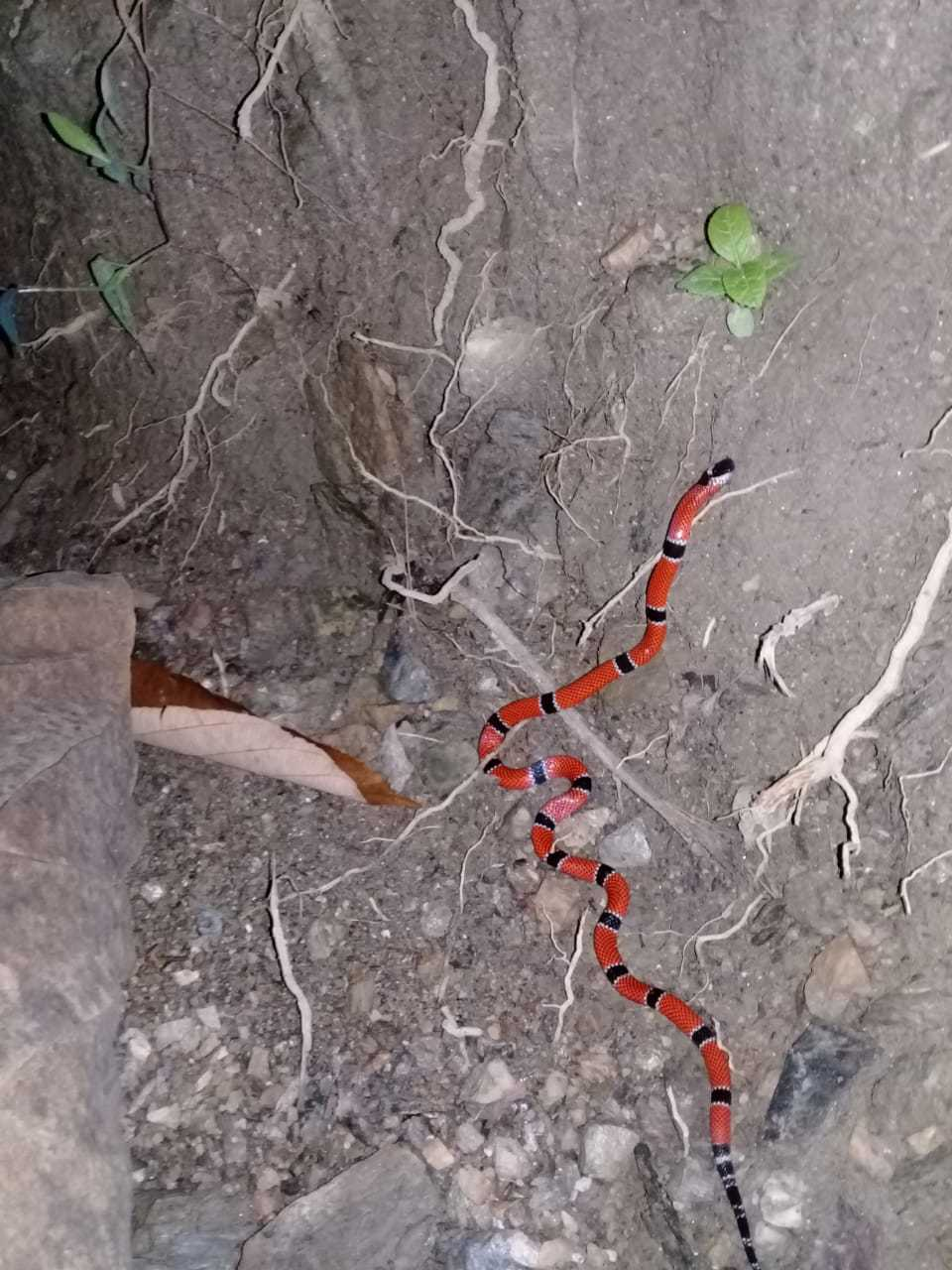

Conservation status
- Least Concern (IUCN 3.1)

Scientific classification
- Kingdom: Animalia
- Phylum: Chordata
- Class: Reptilia
- Order: Squamata
- Suborder: Serpentes
- Family: Elapidae
- Genus: Micrurus
- Species: M. dumerilii

Binomial name
- Micrurus dumerilii (Jan, 1858)
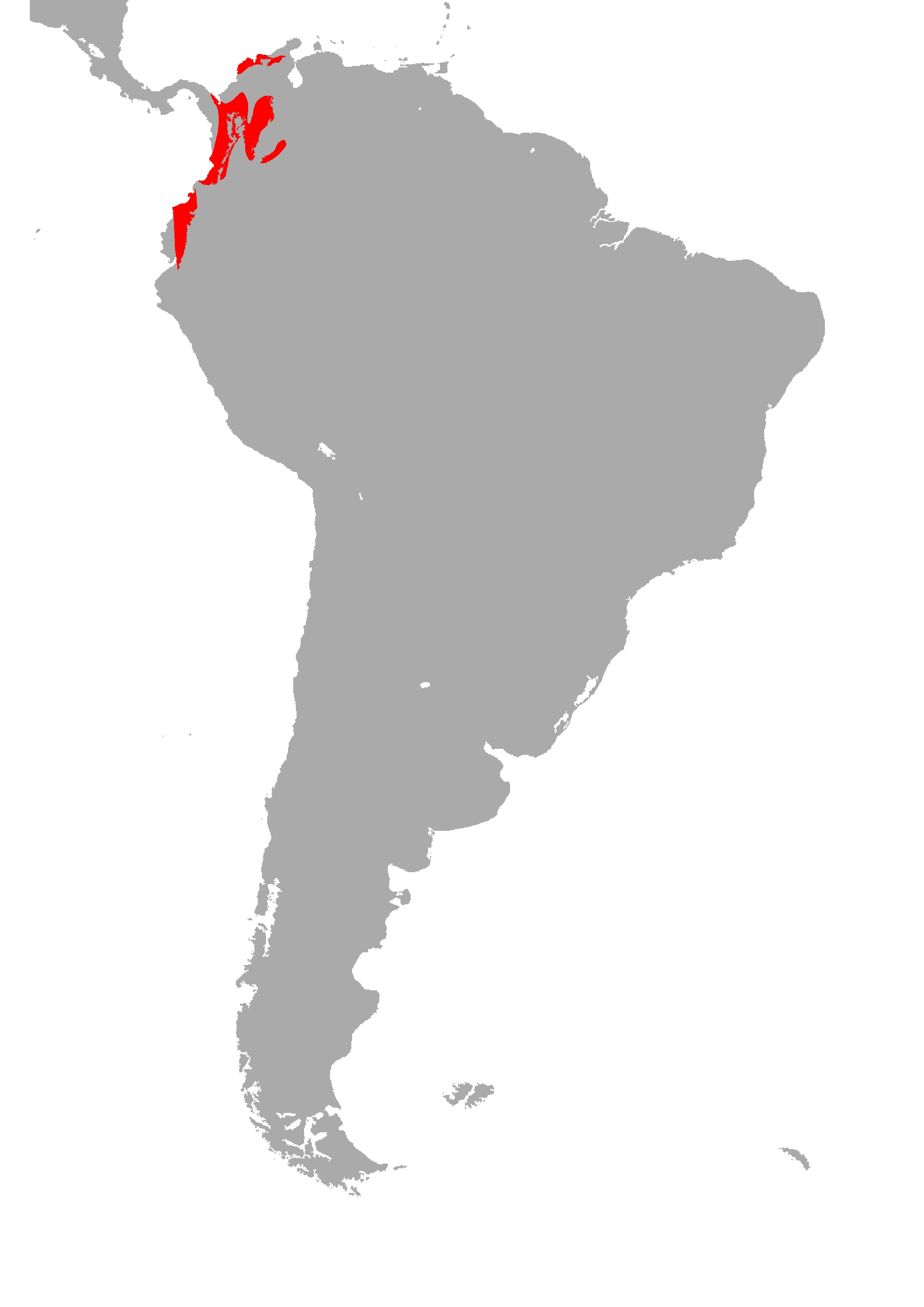

Synonyms
- Elaps dumerilii Jan, 1858

= Micrurus dumerilii =

Species of snake

Micrurus dumerilii, also known commonly as the Capuchin coral snake, Duméril's coral snake, and coral capuchina in New World Spanish, is a species of venomous snake in the family Elapidae. The species is native to extreme southeastern Central America and extreme northwestern South America. There are six recognized subspecies.

== Etymology ==
The specific name, dumerilii, is in honor of French herpetologist André Marie Constant Duméril.

== Description ==
Medium-sized for the genus Micrurus, adults of Micrurus dumerilii usually have a total length (tail included) of 50–70 cm (20–28 in). However, the maximum recorded total length is 92.2 cm (36.3 in). Like most coral snakes, coloration consists of rings of red, black, and white. The pattern of the rings varies among subspecies, some being single and some being in triads.

== Geographic distribution ==
Micrurus dumerilii is found in northern and western Colombia, northern Ecuador, southeastern Panama, and northwestern Venezuela.

== Habitat ==
The preferred natural habitat of Micrurus dumerilii is forest, especially near water, at elevations from near sea level to 2,133 m (6,998 ft).

== Behavior ==
Micrurus dumerilii is terrestrial and semi-fossorial.

== Reproduction ==
Micrurus dumerilii is oviparous.

== Subspecies ==
Six subspecies are recognized as being valid, including the nominotypical subspecies.

- Micrurus dumerilii antioquiensis Schmidt, 1936
- Micrurus dumerilii carinicauda Schmidt, 1936
- Micrurus dumerilii colombianus (Griffin, 1916)
- Micrurus dumerilii dumerilii (Jan, 1858)
- Micrurus dumerilii transandinus Schmidt, 1936
- Micrurus dumerilii venezuelensis Roze, 1989

Nota bene: A trinomial authority in parentheses indicates that the subspecies was originally described in a genus other than Micrurus.

== Venom ==
Micrurus dumerilii possesses a potent venom. When live specimens were "milked" in a laboratory, the venom yield was 5–7 mg (dry weight), which is approximately equal to the estimated lethal dose of 4–6 mg for an adult human.
