= Lancini's robber frog =

Conservation status
- Vulnerable (IUCN 3.1)

Scientific classification
- Kingdom: Animalia
- Phylum: Chordata
- Class: Amphibia
- Order: Anura
- Clade: Brachycephaloidea
- Family: Craugastoridae
- Genus: Pristimantis
- Species: P. lancinii

Binomial name
- Pristimantis lancinii (Donoso-Barros, 1968)

Synonyms
- Eupsophus lancinii Donoso-Barros, 1965; Eleutherodactylus lancinii (Donoso-Barros, 1968)

Species of amphibian

Lancini's robber frog (Pristimantis lancinii) is a species of frog in the family Strabomantidae. It is endemic to Venezuela. Its natural habitat is tropical high-altitude grassland. It is threatened by habitat loss.
