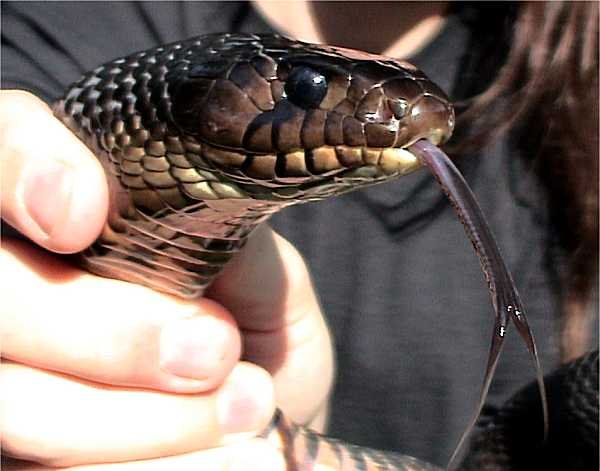
- Texas indigo snake

Conservation status
- Apparently Secure (NatureServe)

Scientific classification
- Kingdom: Animalia
- Phylum: Chordata
- Class: Reptilia
- Order: Squamata
- Suborder: Serpentes
- Family: Colubridae
- Genus: Drymarchon
- Species: D. melanurus
- Subspecies: D. m. erebennus

Trinomial name
- Drymarchon melanurus erebennus (Cope, 1860)

Synonyms
- Spilotes erebennus Cope, 1860; Drymarchon corais erebennus — Taylor, 1949; Drymarchon melanurus erebennus — Wüster et al., 2001

= Drymarchon melanurus erebennus =

Subspecies of snake

Drymarchon melanurus erebennus, commonly known as the Texas indigo snake, is a subspecies of large, nonvenomous snake in the family Colubridae. The subspecies is native to Texas in the United States and adjacent Mexico.

== Geographic range ==
D. m. erebennus is found from South Texas south into Mexico as far as Veracruz.

== Description ==
Dorsally, the Texas indigo snake is predominantly black in color, with a high sheen, which gives its smooth scales a remarkable iridescent hue. The underside is often a salmon pink color. It is a large snake, regularly attaining a total length (including tail) beyond 6 ft (1.8 m). Specimens 8 ft (2.4 m) long are not unheard of.

== Habitat ==
The Texas indigo snake ranges from central-eastern and northeastern Mexico to south and central Texas and lives in Tamaulipan thornscrub habitat. The Texas indigo snake prefers lightly vegetated areas not far from permanent water sources, but is also found in mesquite savanna, open grassland areas, and coastal sand dunes. It dens in burrows left by other animals.

== Behavior and diet ==
D. m. erebennus is diurnal and spends most of its time actively hiding. It consumes almost any prey it can overpower and swallow, including mammals, birds, lizards, frogs, turtles, eggs, and even other snakes, including rattlesnakes. Because of its aggressive attacks on rattlesnakes, many farmers in South Texas consider it a useful ally, hence the adage, "If it's an indigo, let it go." It is a defensive snake, but may bite or release a foul-smelling musk from its cloaca if handled or harassed. Like many colubrid snakes, it often shakes its tail as a warning, though it does not possess a rattle.

== Reproduction ==
Breeding of D. m. erebennus takes place, generally yearly, in the winter. Clutches of typically 10–12 eggs are laid in the spring and hatch around 80 days later. Hatchlings can be up to 26 in (66 cm) long. Maturity is reached in 2–3 years.

== Conservation ==
The Texas indigo snake is listed as a threatened species by the state of Texas. Its primary threat is from habitat loss due to human development. Each snake requires a large home range to forage, and urban sprawl is shrinking its usable habitat. Roads bisect its territory, and many snakes each year are run over by cars.
