= Joseph Franz von Jacquin =

Austrian scientist (1766–1839)

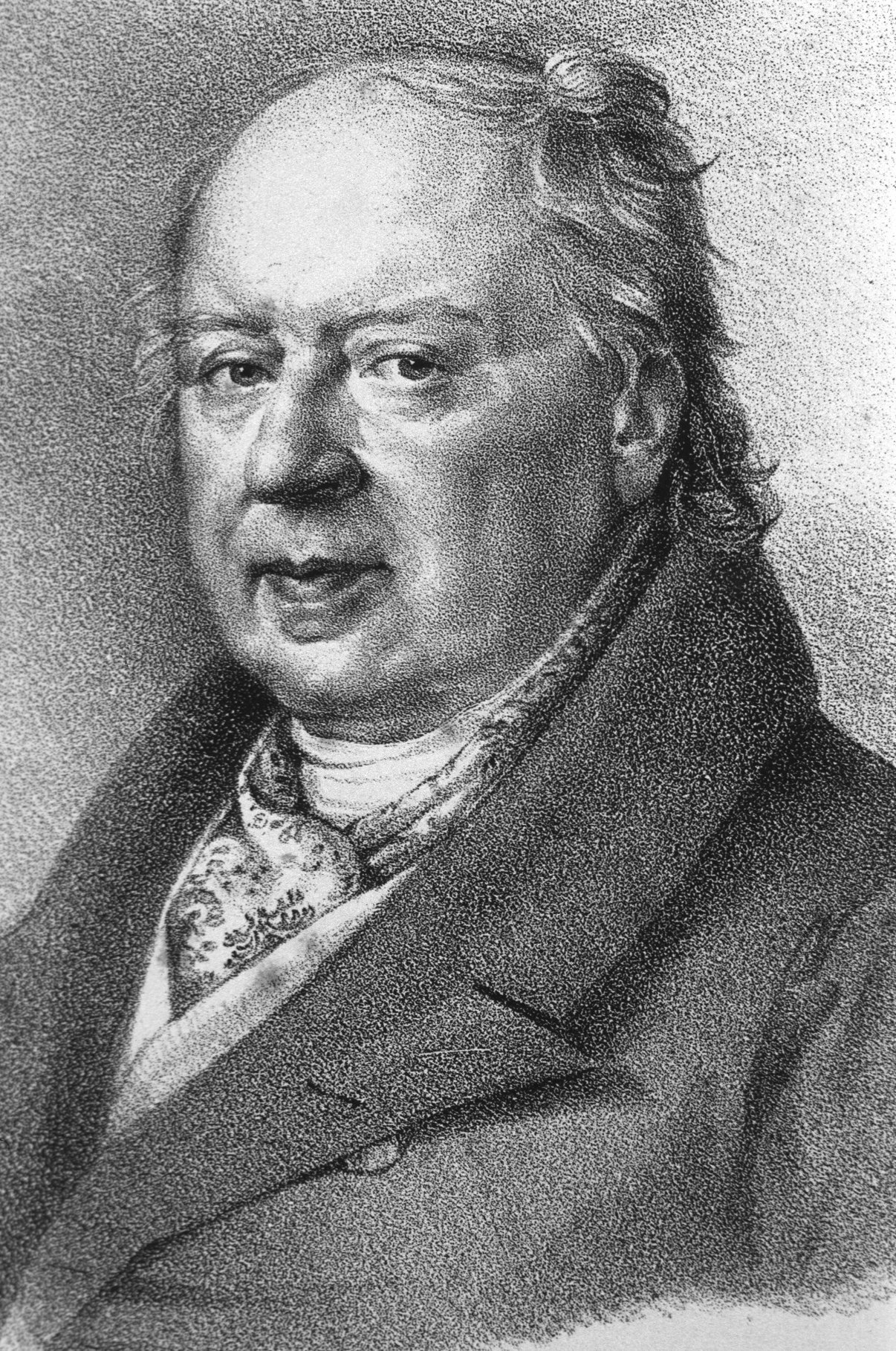
Joseph Franz von Jacquin

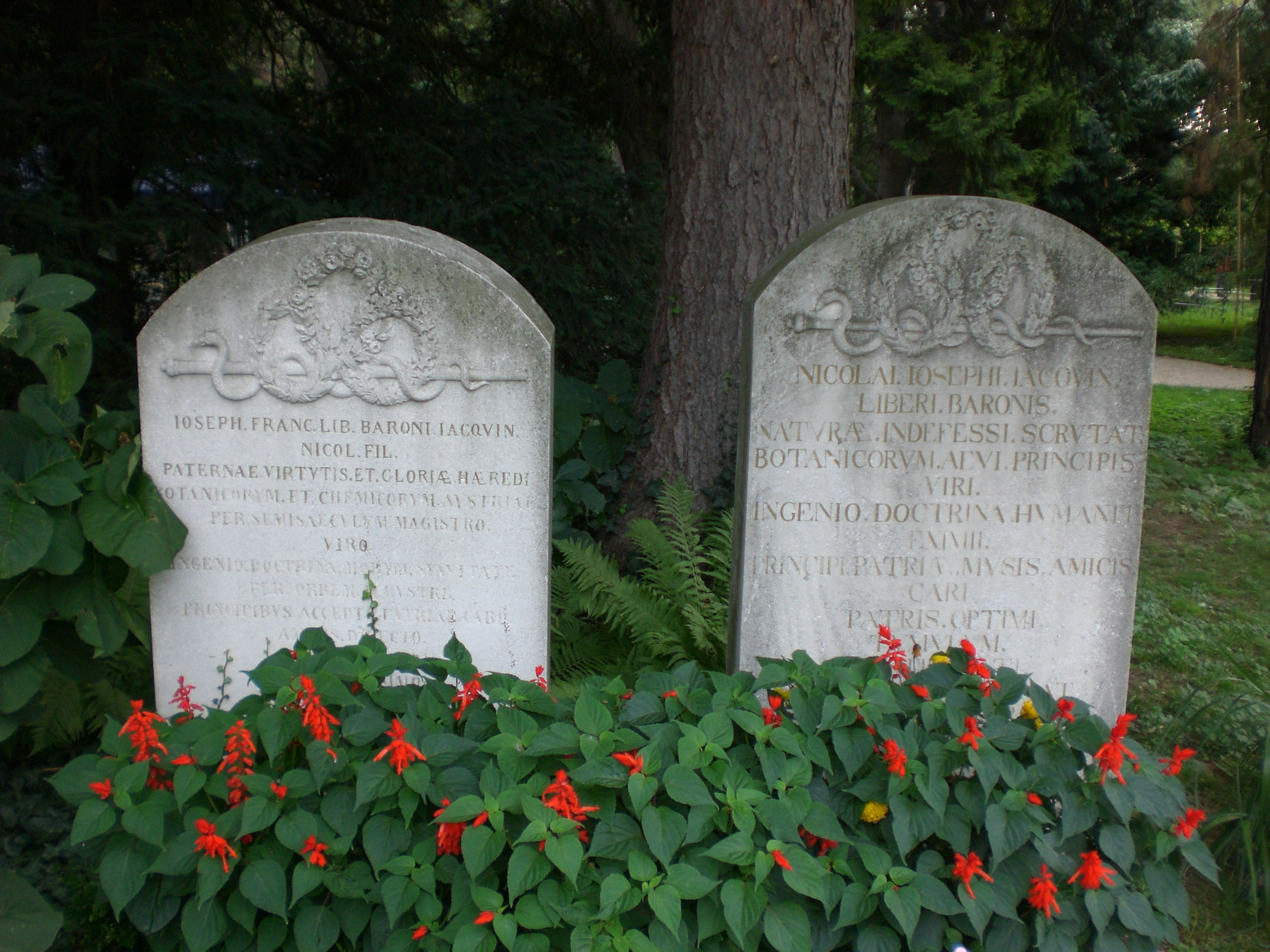
Memorial

Joseph Franz Freiherr von Jacquin or Baron Joseph von Jacquin (7 February 1766 – 26 October 1839) was an Austrian scientist who studied medicine, chemistry, zoology and botany. The standard author abbreviation J.Jacq. is used to indicate this person as the author when citing a botanical name. He was the son of the botanist Nikolaus von Jacquin.

== Biography ==
Jacquin was born on 7 February 1766 in Schemnitz (today Banská Štiavnica, Slovakia). He was the son of the naturalist Nikolaus Joseph who served as a professor of chemistry at the mining academy at Schemnitz. He became interested in science from an early age thanks to the home. Even as an eleven year old, he discovered that not all lizards lay eggs and in 1778 he published a note on De Lacerta vivipara in the Nova acta Helvetica. He followed his father in the medical profession and graduated from the University of Vienna as a doctor of medicine in 1788. With support from Emperor Francis II he went on a grand tour through Germany, Holland and England. He met and stayed at the home of Joseph Banks, met William Herschel, Jonas Dryander, Antoine Jussieu, Lavoisier, and Vauquelin. He returned in 1791 and like his father he sought to visit the West Indies but this did not happen. He was made an adjunct to his father in 1793 and in 1797 his father retired from the University of Vienna making the position available to him. He worked there until 1838.

Jacquin published a textbook of general and medicinal chemistry. He also worked on an Austrian Pharmacopoeia along with his father. He supervised the Imperial Garden in the Belvedere. In 1821, he was elected a foreign member of the Royal Swedish Academy of Sciences. He served as the founding vice-president of the Royal Horticultural Society which was established in 1837. He died on 26 October 1839 in Vienna.

Jacquin married pianist Baroness Maria Barbara (died 1844), daughter of Franz Wilhelm Freiherr von Natorp. They had a daughter who married Carl Franz Anton Ritter von Schreibers.

== Publications ==
- Jacquin, J. F. Beyträge zur Geschichte der Vögel. C.F. Wappler, Vienna, 1784.
- Jacquin, J.F. Lehrbuch der allgemeinen und medicinischen Chymie zum Gebrauche seiner Vorlesungen. C.F. Wappler, Vienna, 1798.
- Jacquin, J.F., E. Fenzl & I. Schreibers. Eclogae plantarum rariorum aut minus cognitarum : quas ad vivum descripsit et iconibus coloratis illustravit. A. Strauss, Vienna, 1811–1844.
- Jacquin, J.F., E. Fenzl & I. Schreibers. Eclogae graminum rariorum aut minus cognitarum : quae ad vivum descripsit et iconibus coloratis illustravit. A. Strauss et Sommer, Vienna, 1813–1844.
- Jacquin, J. F. Ueber den Ginkgo, Carl Gerold, Vienna, 1819.
