= Carl Franz Anton Ritter von Schreibers =

Austro-Hungarian scientist

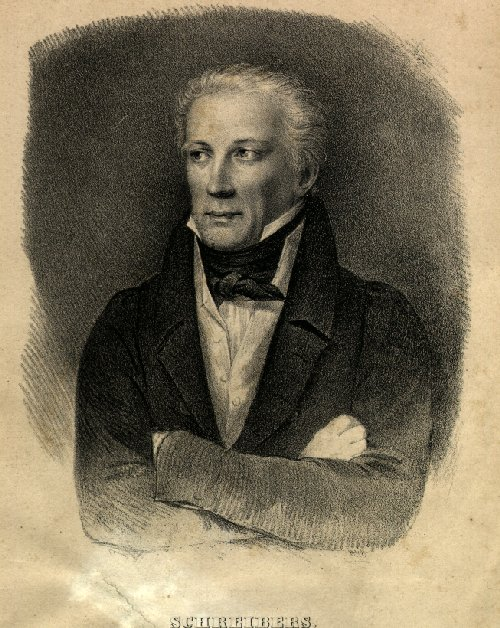
Karl Franz Anton von Schreibers

Carl Franz Anton Ritter von Schreibers (15 August 1775 – 21 May 1852) was an Austrian naturalist who was involved in organizing the natural history cabinet "Naturalienkabinette" of the Austrian emperor Franz II which later became the natural history museum of Vienna. He took an interest in zoology as well as minerals and particularly meteorites.

== Biography ==
Schreibers was born in Pressburg, Hungary, Habsburg Empire (today Bratislava, Slovakia) where his father was a military archivist. He was tutored at home before going to the Löwenburg Seminary in Vienna where he was influenced by his uncle Joseph Ludwig von Schreibers (1735-1809) who was a physician. He then studied medicine and earned his medical doctorate from Vienna in 1798, but also studied botany, mineralogy and zoology at the university. For a brief period of time he assisted his uncle, Joseph Ludwig von Schreibers, with his medical practice in Vienna. As a young man, he also toured museums throughout Europe. He met Sir Joseph Banks in England. In 1802 he was an assistant to professor Jordan and worked on natural history and agricultural sciences at the University of Vienna. He also lectured on various topics. He clashed with Andreas Freiherr von Stifft who came in his way until 1834. In 1806, following the death of Andreas Xaverius Stütz, he was appointed director of the Viennese natural history collections (Naturalienkabinette), which became his life's work.

Schreibers was involved with all aspects of natural sciences, and he embarked upon total organizational overhaul of the museum's natural history collections. During his time as director, the size of the museum's library grew from a few scientific books to a collection of over 30,000 volumes. Here, he stored the results of his personal research work, as well as a collection of meteorites — Schreibers' main interest of study. On 31 October 1848 some parts of the collections of the museum were destroyed by fire during the course of bombardment of Viennese revolutionaries by the Austrian Imperial Army. Schreibers was devastated by the loss, and retired soon afterwards. Fortunately his collection of meteorites was saved from destruction.

As a zoologist, he was the first to perform a comprehensive anatomical study of the olm, a cave-dwelling, aquatic amphibian. The plant genus Schreibersia (synonym Augusta, family Rubiaceae) was named in his honor by Johann Baptist Emanuel Pohl. The common bent-wing bat (Miniopterus schreibersii), also known as the Schreibers's long-fingered bat or Schreibers's bat, is a species of insectivorous bat. Schreibers is also commemorated in the scientific names of two species of New World lizards: Cercosaura schreibersii and Leiocephalus schreibersii. In 1847, an uncommon iron-nickel-phosphide ((Fe,Ni)3P) mineral was named in his honor by Wilhelm Karl Ritter von Haidinger (1775–1871). The mineral is found in meteorites, and is known today as schreibersite.

Von Schreibers married IsabeIIa, daughter of Joseph Franz von Jacquin, and they had a son who became an Austrian official. A daughter Sophie predeceased him.
