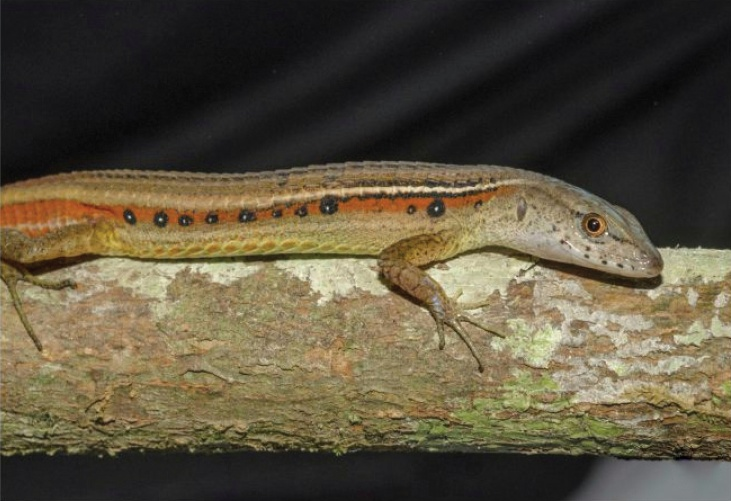

Scientific classification
- Domain: Eukaryota
- Kingdom: Animalia
- Phylum: Chordata
- Class: Reptilia
- Order: Squamata
- Family: Gymnophthalmidae
- Genus: Cercosaura
- Species: C. ocellata

Binomial name
- Cercosaura ocellata Wagler, 1830

= Cercosaura ocellata =

Species of lizard

Cercosaura ocellata, the ocellated tegu, is a species of lizard in the family Gymnophthalmidae. It is found in Brazil, Venezuela, Guyana, Suriname, French Guiana, Peru, Bolivia, Colombia, Argentina, and Paraguay.
