= Cercosaura bassleri =

Scientific classification
- Kingdom: Animalia
- Phylum: Chordata
- Class: Reptilia
- Order: Squamata
- Family: Gymnophthalmidae
- Genus: Cercosaura
- Species: C. bassleri

Binomial name
- Cercosaura bassleri Ruibal, 1952

Synonyms
- Cercosaura ocellata bassleri Ruibal, 1952; Cercosaura bassleri — Torres-Carvajal, Lobos & Venegas, 2015

Species of lizard

Cercosaura bassleri, known commonly as the ocellated tegu, is a species of lizard in the family Gymnophthalmidae. The species is endemic to Peru.

== Etymology ==
The specific name, bassleri, is in honor of Dr. Harvey Bassler of the American Museum of Natural History.

== Geographic range ==
Cercosaura bassleri is found on the eastern slopes of the Andes, in Perené District, Chanchamayo Province, Department of Junín, Peru.
