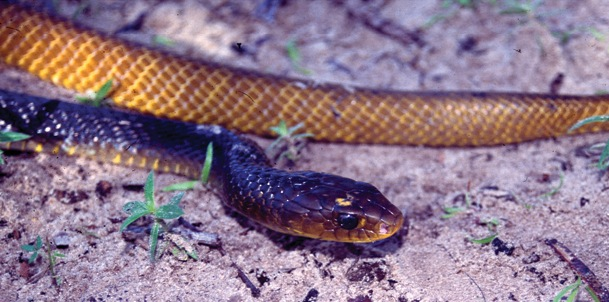

Conservation status
- Least Concern (IUCN 3.1)

Scientific classification
- Kingdom: Animalia
- Phylum: Chordata
- Class: Reptilia
- Order: Squamata
- Suborder: Serpentes
- Family: Colubridae
- Genus: Drymarchon
- Species: D. corais

Binomial name
- Drymarchon corais (Boie, 1827)

Synonyms
- Coluber corais Boie, 1827; Geoptyas collaris Steindachner, 1867; Geoptyas flaviventris Steindachner, 1867; Phrynonax angulifer Werner, 1923; Drymarchon corais cleofae Brock, 1942

= Indigo snake (species) =

Species of snake

The indigo snake (Drymarchon corais), also known as the yellow-tail cribo, is a species of snake in the family Colubridae. This large colubrid snake is nonvenomous.

== Taxonomy ==
Until recently, all Drymarchon were classified as subspecies of D. corais. However, North and Central populations are now assigned to different species (D. melanurus, D. couperi and D. kolpobasileus), and D. caudomaculatus and D. margaritae are recognised as separate species in South America.

== Range ==
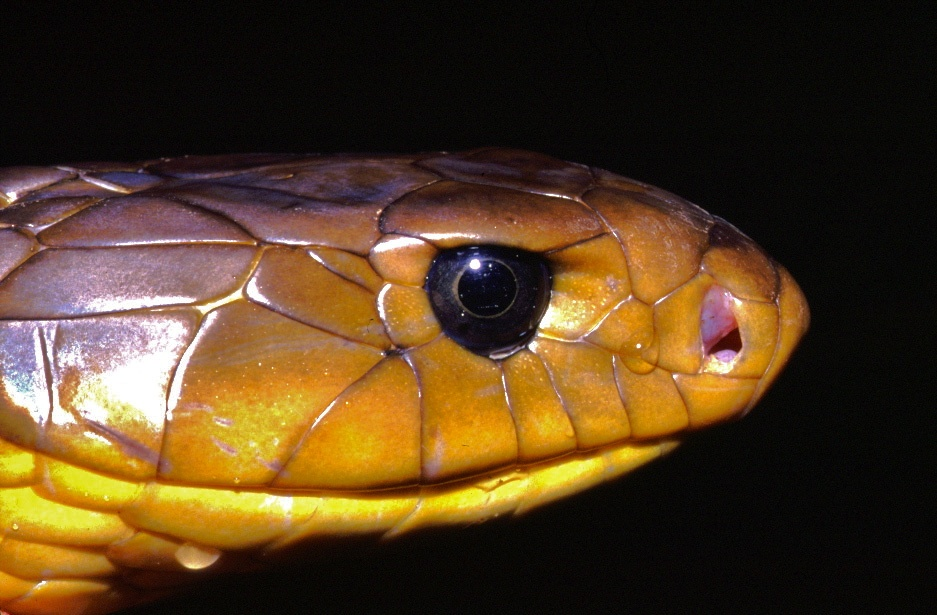

This snake is found in South America, including Bolivia, Brazil, Colombia, Ecuador, French Guiana, Guyana, Paraguay, Peru, Suriname and Venezuela as well as Trinidad and Tobago.

== Diet ==
The species forages on the ground, sometimes climbing low vegetation. It feeds on a variety of prey species including fish, frogs, reptiles, reptile eggs, mammals, birds and bird eggs.

== Gallery ==
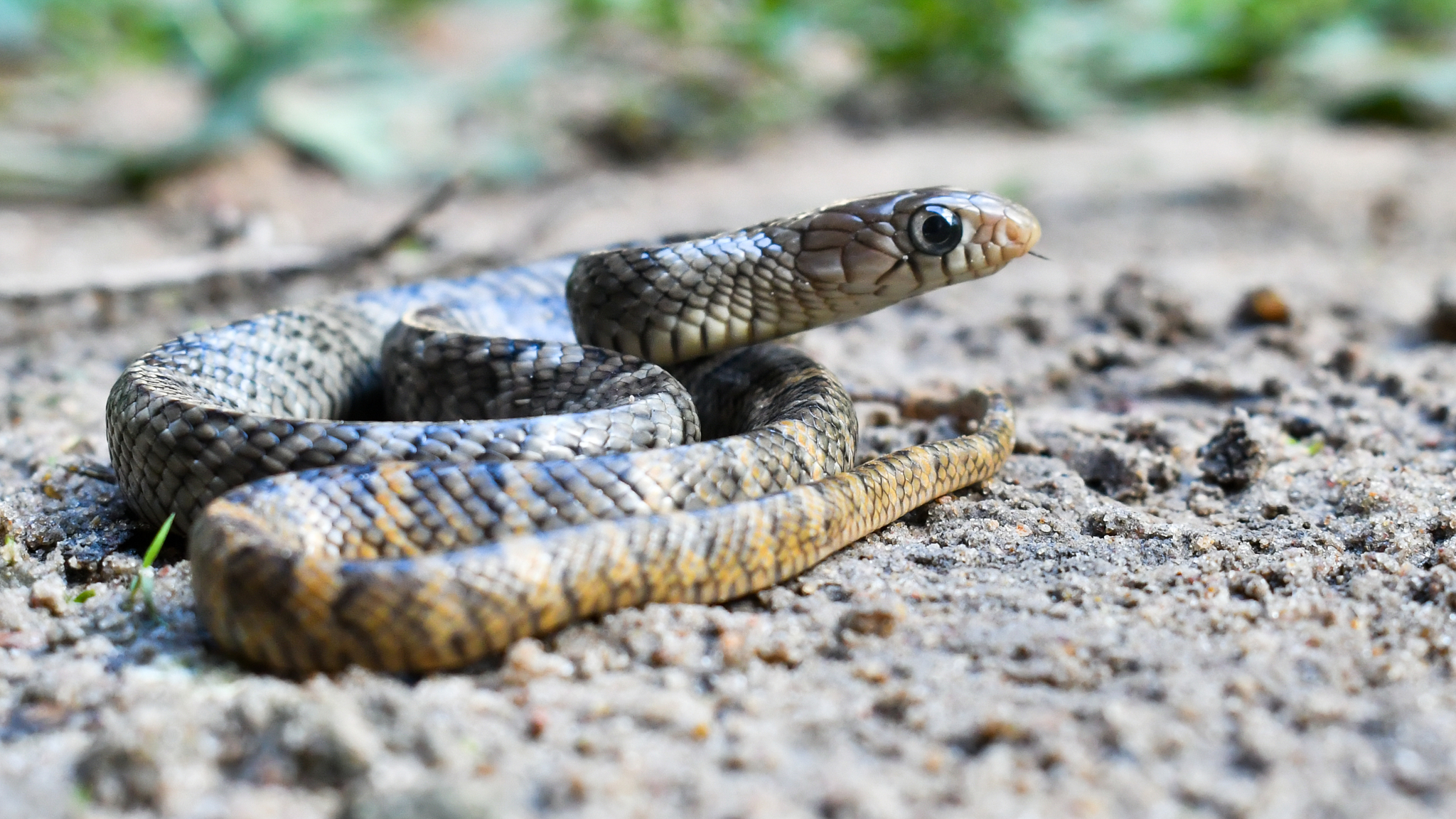

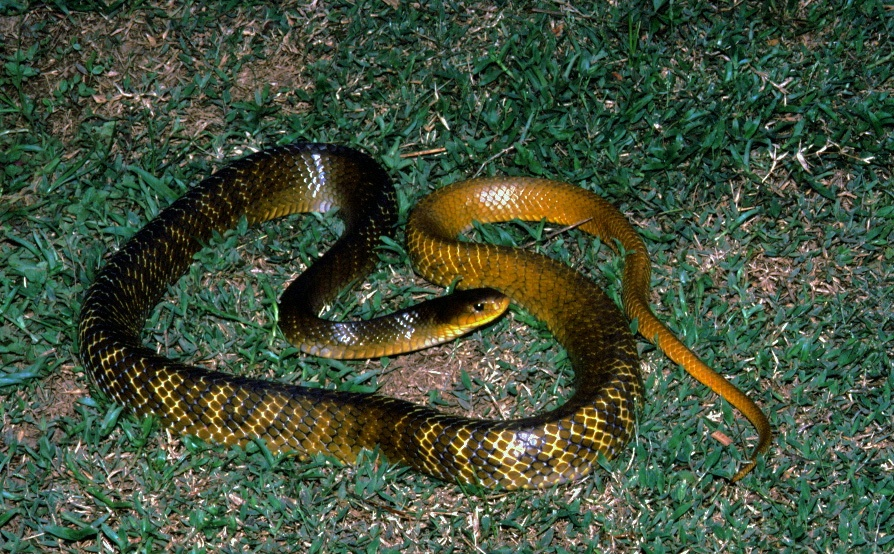

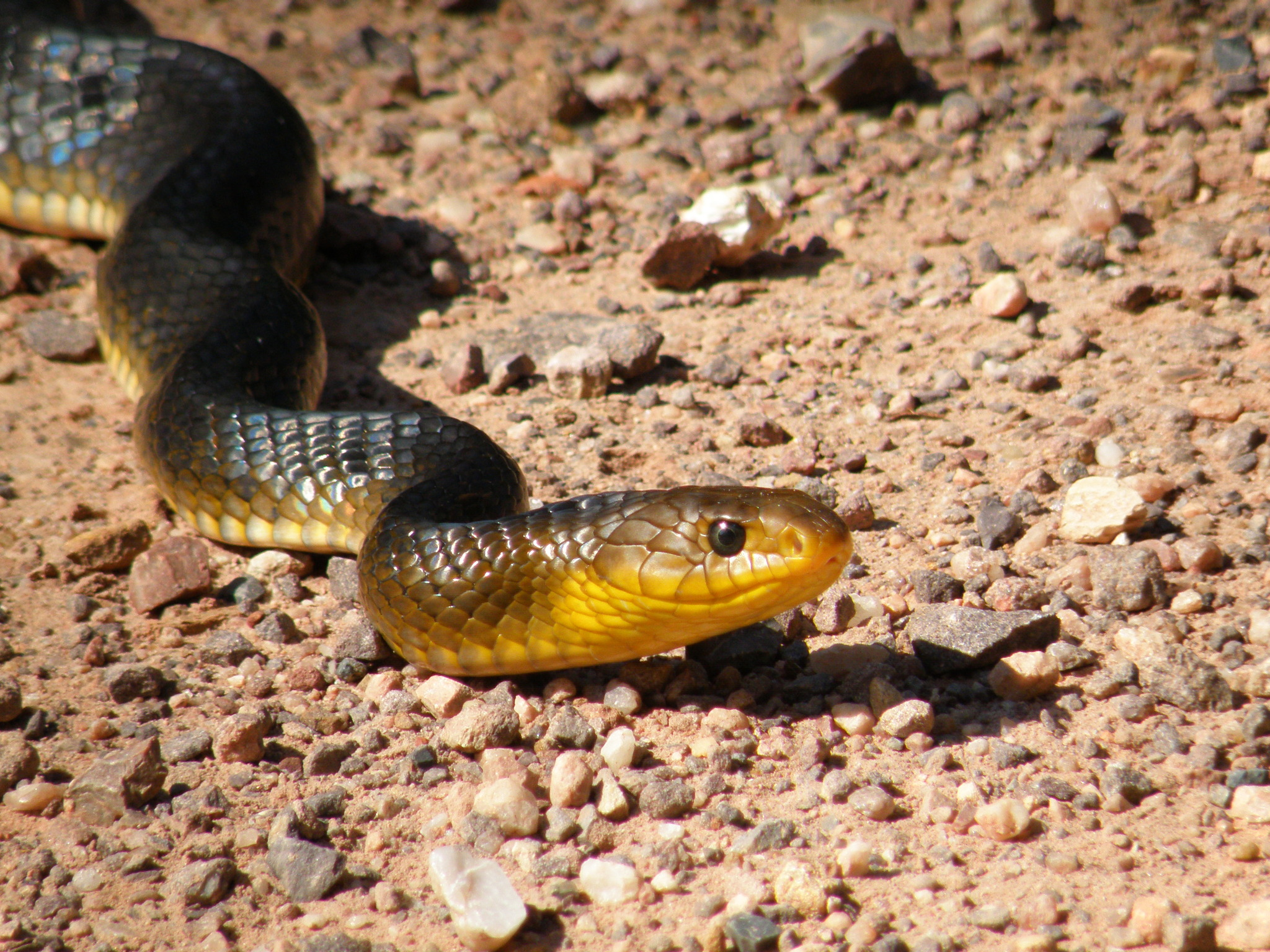

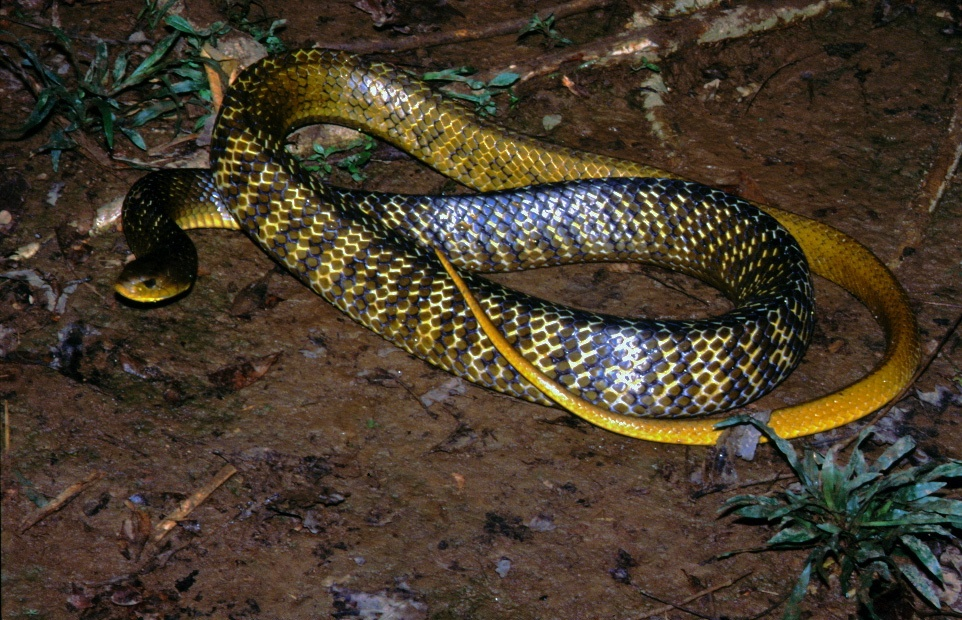
