= Janis Roze =

Jānis Arnolds Roze, born in Latvia in 1926, is a herpetologist and Professor of Biology Emeritus of City College and Graduate School of the City University of New York. He was professionally associated with the American Museum of Natural History and the United Nations. A founder of the International Center for Integrative Studies, he published several books and narrated several videos on Creative Evolution. He co-edited What Does it Mean to Be Human.

== Biography ==
A short résumé from the "Be Human" film site of The Ecological Institute of Búzios, Atlantic Rain Forest, Brazil:

- Fulbright Senior Scholar.
- Co-Director of UASD International Exchange Program of University of New York.
- Advisor at United Nations Center of Science and Technology.
- Member of the expert group of UN for the establishment of a new international order.
- Member of the ICIS (International Center of Integrative Studies), and Elpis Foundation, Argentina.

== Published works ==
=== Books ===
- Coral Snakes of the Americas: Biology , Identification, and Venoms. Malabar, Florida: Krieger Publishing Company. (1996).

=== Other publications ===
- On Hallowell's type specimens of reptiles from Venezuela in the collection of the Academy of Natural Sciences of Philadelphia. (1958).
- Taxonomic notes on a collection of Venezuelan reptiles in the American Museum of Natural History. (1959).
- La taxonomía y zoogeografía de los ofidios en Venezuela. (1966). (in Spanish).
- A check list of the New World venomous coral snakes (Elapidae), with descriptions of new forms. (1967).
- Ciencia y fantasía sobre las serpentes de Venezuela. (1970). (in Spanish).
- New Species and Subspecies of Coral Snakes, Genus Micrurus (Elapidae), with Notes on Type Specimens of Several Species. American Museum Novitates. (1989).
- Evolución y magia: el camino del hombre. (2000). (in Spanish).

== Awards ==
- Golden medal of merit, Central University of Venezuela.
- National award of Scientific Research of Venezuela. (1962).
- Doctor Honoris Causa, Pontifícia Universidade Católica de Goiás. October 18, 2016.

== Eponyms ==
A species of worm lizard, Amphisbaena rozei, is named in his honor.
