= Distribution of Heliamphora =

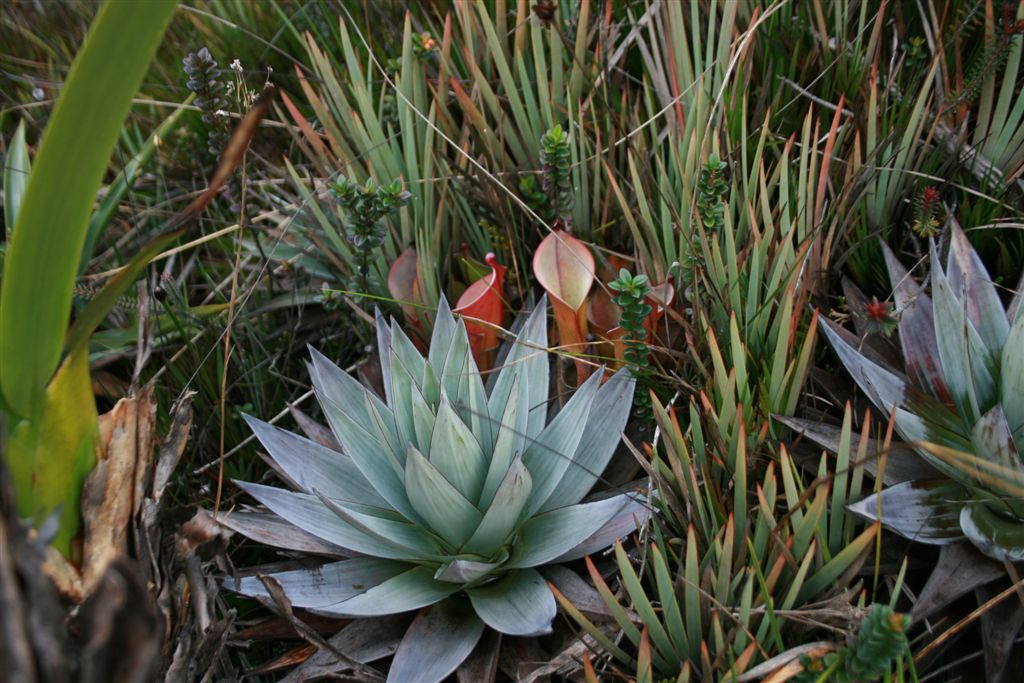
Heliamphora nutans (centre) growing with sympatric Orectanthe sceptrum on Mount Roraima, where it was discovered in 1838 as the first member of its genus.

The natural range of the carnivorous plant genus Heliamphora is restricted to the southern Venezuelan states of Amazonas and Bolívar, and to adjacent portions of northern Brazil and western Guyana, an area corresponding to the western part of the Guayana Shield. These plants are largely confined to the summits and foothills of the sandstone table-top mountains of the region, known as tepuis.

The genus has a highly disjunct distribution spread across two major groups of tepuis: the western range in Amazonas and the eastern range in Bolívar. The western range can be further subdivided into two complexes of neighbouring tepuis. The more southerly of these consists of Cerro de la Neblina, Cerro Aracamuni, and Cerro Avispa, and supports four Heliamphora species. The more northerly group of the western range, home to only two species, includes the massive Cerro Duida and neighbouring Cerro Huachamacari and Cerro Marahuaca. The remaining 17–19 species are native to the eastern range, which includes the Aprada Massif, Auyán Massif, Chimantá Massif, Eastern Tepuis chain, Los Testigos chain, and a number of outlying tepuis. Many of the summits of the eastern range are situated on a vast plateau known as the Gran Sabana. Only two species (H. ciliata and H. heterodoxa) are known with certainty from the Gran Sabana, and only H. ciliata is endemic to this habitat.

The altitudinal distribution of Heliamphora ranges from 860 m above sea level for populations of H. neblinae on Cerro Avispa to as much as 2994 m for plants of H. hispida growing near the summit of Pico da Neblina in Cerro de la Neblina.

== Key ==
Tepui names shown in the tables are those used in Flora of the Venezuelan Guayana and Sarraceniaceae of South America, with alternate names and spellings given in brackets. Many additional orthographic variants are likely to exist and some localities remain the subject of considerable toponymic confusion; these cases are covered in the Notes section. Many of the tepui heights are approximate and likely to change as more accurate measurements become available. Only tepuis known to support Heliamphora are included in the tables (for example, not all parts of the Chimantá Massif or Eastern Tepuis chain are listed). Formally described species are listed first, followed by undescribed species, and finally natural hybrids. Where published information is available, the altitudinal distribution of a taxon at a particular locality is given. In cases of unconfirmed locality records, the taxon name is preceded by a question mark (?).

Coordinates given correspond to the approximate centre points of tepui summit plateaus (though in the case of fragmented tepui complexes such as Cerro de la Neblina, the centre point itself may not lie on any plateau). Unless otherwise indicated, all other information presented in the tables is sourced from Sarraceniaceae of South America.

Distribution of currently recognised Heliamphora species
| Species | Distribution | Altitudinal distribution |
|---|---|---|
| H. arenicola | Venezuela | ?–2000 m |
| H. ceracea | Brazil | 1900 m^{[nb a]} |
| H. chimantensis | Venezuela | 1900–2100 m |
| H. ciliata | Venezuela | 900 m |
| H. collina | Venezuela | 1700–1825 m |
| H. elongata | Venezuela | 1800–2600 m |
| H. exappendiculata | Venezuela | 1700–2100 m |
| H. folliculata | Venezuela | 1700–2400 m |
| H. glabra | Brazil, Guyana, Venezuela | 1200–2750 m |
| H. heterodoxa | Guyana?, Venezuela | 1200–2200 m |
| H. hispida | Brazil, Venezuela | 1800–2994 m |
| H. huberi | Venezuela | 1850–2200 m |
| H. ionasi | Venezuela | 1800–2600 m |
| H. macdonaldae | Venezuela | 1500–2300 m |
| H. minor | Venezuela | 1650–2500 m |
| H. neblinae | Brazil, Venezuela | 860–2200 m |
| H. nutans | Brazil, Guyana, Venezuela | 2000–2700 m |
| H. parva | Venezuela | 1750–2200 m |
| H. pulchella | Venezuela | 1850–2550 m |
| H. purpurascens | Venezuela | 2400–2500 m |
| H. sarracenioides | Venezuela | 2400–2450 m |
| H. tatei | Venezuela | 1700–2400 m |
| H. uncinata | Venezuela | 1850 m |
| H. sp. 'Akopán Tepui' | Venezuela | 1800–1900 m |
| H. sp. 'Angasima Tepui' | Venezuela | 2200–2250 m |

Map of Venezuela showing the major tepuis, massifs and uplands to which Heliamphora are native. The distribution of this genus is highly disjunct, with all known species concentrated in three major areas: the Duida and Neblina complexes of Amazonas, and the tepuis and uplands of southeastern Bolívar.

== Western range ==
The western range of the genus is confined almost entirely to Amazonas state, Venezuela, but extends slightly into northernmost Brazil.

=== Neblina Massif ===
The Neblina Massif is located in the extreme south of Amazonas and is dominated by the highly fragmented complex known as Cerro de la Neblina. This complex has many plateaus averaging 2000–2400 m in elevation, and includes Brazil's two highest peaks: Pico da Neblina (2994 m) and Pico 31 de Março (2973 m), known as Pico Phelps in Venezuela.^{[nb b]} A giant valley, Cañón Grande, runs southwest to northeast through the middle of Cerro de la Neblina. The smaller outcrops of Cerro Aracamuni and Cerro Avispa, both reaching approximately 1600 m, lie to the north of this complex. The name Neblina Massif is sometimes applied specifically to Cerro de la Neblina, to the exclusion of Cerro Aracamuni and Cerro Avispa.

Four species are native to this area, all local endemics: H. ceracea, H. hispida, H. neblinae, and H. parva, though only the range of H. neblinae extends to the two northern cerro-plateaus. No Heliamphora are found on the small granitic outcrop of Cerro Aratitiyope (1700 m) to the north of the Neblina Massif.

| Locality | Coordinates | Native taxa | Altitudinal distribution | Distribution notes |
|---|---|---|---|---|
| Cerro de la Neblina (Sierra de la Neblina) | 0.886424°N 65.989483°W | H. ceracea | 1900 m^{[nb a]} | Known only from several small populations on slopes of Pico da Neblina in Brazil, but may have wider distribution. If not, it would be the only known species not found in Venezuela. |
| Cerro de la Neblina (Sierra de la Neblina) | 0.886424°N 65.989483°W | H. hispida | 1800–2994 m | Found in southern portion of Cerro de la Neblina, on and around Pico da Neblina and Pico 31 de Março (including area around the Titirico River). Additional populations may grow in the largely unexplored Cañón Grande. Plants near the summit of Pico da Neblina (2994 m) represent the upper altitudinal limit for the genus. |
| Cerro de la Neblina (Sierra de la Neblina) | 0.886424°N 65.989483°W | H. neblinae | 2000–2200 m | Known with certainty from southern portion of Cerro de la Neblina, where it grows on and around Pico da Neblina. Herbarium material suggests it is also present in the northern parts, though it has not been observed in the extreme north. |
| Cerro de la Neblina (Sierra de la Neblina) | 0.886424°N 65.989483°W | H. parva | 1750–2200 m | Recorded from southern part of Cerro de la Neblina around Pico da Neblina at 2000–2200 m, though the largest known stands grow in the northwestern part of the massif, at lower elevations of 1750–1850 m. It is unknown whether the range of this species extends into the central valleys of Cerro de la Neblina. |
| Cerro de la Neblina (Sierra de la Neblina) | 0.886424°N 65.989483°W | H. ceracea × H. hispida | | Recorded from Brazilian border area on flanks of Pico da Neblina. |
| Cerro de la Neblina (Sierra de la Neblina) | 0.886424°N 65.989483°W | H. neblinae × H. parva | | Found in the north of Cerro de la Neblina. Complex backcrosses have been recorded. |
| Cerro de la Neblina (Sierra de la Neblina) | 0.886424°N 65.989483°W | Undetermined hybrids | | Putative complex swarms involving H. ceracea, H. hispida, H. neblinae and H. parva are found in the southern part of Cerro de la Neblina, below Pico da Neblina. |
| Cerro Aracamuni | 1.567416°N 65.880993°W | H. neblinae | | Widespread on this mountain. |
| Cerro Avispa | 1.336091°N 65.878933°W | H. neblinae | ≥860 m | Widespread on this mountain. Populations growing at 860 m represent the lower altitudinal limit for the genus. |

=== Duida group ===
This area consists of the giant Cerro Duida as well as the much smaller Cerro Huachamacari to the northwest and Cerro Marahuaca to the northeast. Cerro Duida and Cerro Marahuaca share a common base and together form the Duida–Marahuaca Massif, while Cerro Huachamacari is derived from a separate base. The uneven plateau of Cerro Duida is heavily inclined, rising north to south from around 1300–1400 m to a maximum of 2358 m. But the highest point of the massif, at 2832 m, is found on Cerro Marahuaca, this being the second-highest mountain of the entire Guayana Shield (after Cerro de la Neblina). Cerro Marahuaca actually consists of two summit plateaus, the slightly larger northern one going by the Yekwana Amerindian name Fufha or Huha (3.781355°N 65.492352°W). The southern plateau (3.651167°N 65.417507°W) is known by two local names; its northwestern edge is called Fuif (or Fhuif), whereas its southeastern portion is called Atahua'shiho (or Atawa Shisho). A massive ridge known as Cerro Petaca (3.660075°N 65.512951°W) rises to at least 2700 m just west of these two plateaus. The third major tepui of the Duida group, Cerro Huachamacari, is comparatively low, reaching only 1900 m.

Two species are recognised from this complex and found nowhere else: H. macdonaldae and H. tatei. A third described species, H. tyleri, is universally treated as a synonym of H. tatei.

| Locality | Coordinates | Native taxa | Altitudinal distribution | Distribution notes |
|---|---|---|---|---|
| Cerro Duida (Cerro Yennamadi) | 3.513421°N 65.626247°W | H. macdonaldae | 1500–2300 m | Known with certainty from the southern portion of the summit plateau. |
| Cerro Duida (Cerro Yennamadi) | 3.513421°N 65.626247°W | H. tatei | | Found on summits, ridge tops, and slopes. |
| Cerro Duida (Cerro Yennamadi) | 3.513421°N 65.626247°W | ?H. macdonaldae × H. tatei | | This putative natural hybrid has been observed in the southern part of Cerro Duida. |
| Cerro Huachamacari (Cerro Huachamakari, Cerro Kushamakari) | 3.846442°N 65.756023°W | ?H. macdonaldae | | Presence suggested by unconfirmed reports. |
| Cerro Huachamacari (Cerro Huachamakari, Cerro Kushamakari) | 3.846442°N 65.756023°W | H. tatei | | Found on summits, ridge tops, and slopes. |
| Cerro Marahuaca (Cerro Marahuaka) | 3.697763°N 65.463512°W | ?H. macdonaldae | | Presence suggested by unconfirmed reports. |
| Cerro Marahuaca (Cerro Marahuaka) | 3.697763°N 65.463512°W | H. tatei | | Found on summits, ridge tops, and slopes. It is unknown whether this plant is present on the northern summit plateau of Fufha. |

== Eastern range ==
The eastern range of the genus includes the vast majority of species. It is largely encompassed by Bolívar state, Venezuela, but also extends into portions of western Guyana and northern Brazil.

=== Angasima and Upuigma ===
The imposing peaks of Angasima Tepui (2250 m) and Upuigma Tepui (2100 m) lie south of the much larger Chimantá Massif, from which they are separated by the Río Aparurén valley. Three Heliamphora species are native to Angasima Tepui: the undescribed endemic H. sp. 'Angasima Tepui' and two species shared with the nearby Chimantá Massif (H. huberi and H. pulchella). Only the range of H. pulchella extends to the isolated peak of Upuigma Tepui.

| Locality | Coordinates | Native taxa | Altitudinal distribution | Distribution notes |
|---|---|---|---|---|
| Angasima Tepui | 5.047427°N 62.112164°W | H. huberi | | |
| Angasima Tepui | 5.047427°N 62.112164°W | H. pulchella | | |
| Angasima Tepui | 5.047427°N 62.112164°W | H. sp. 'Angasima Tepui' | 2200–2250 m | Endemic to summit region. |
| Upuigma Tepui (El Castillo) | 5.085986°N 61.956288°W | H. pulchella | | |

=== Aprada Massif ===
The Aprada Massif consists of Aprada Tepui (2500 m) and the smaller Araopán Tepui (2450 m) to the east. A steep, semi-circular ridge connects these two summits. The Aprada Massif lies northwest of the much larger Chimantá Massif, with which it shares its two native species: H. exappendiculata and H. pulchella.

| Locality | Coordinates | Native taxa | Altitudinal distribution | Distribution notes |
|---|---|---|---|---|
| Aprada Tepui | 5.410433°N 62.448203°W | H. pulchella | | |
| Aprada Tepui | 5.410433°N 62.448203°W | H. exappendiculata | | Found on summit in marshy savannahs and shrubby forests. |
| Araopán Tepui | 5.439484°N 62.392928°W | H. pulchella | | |
| Araopán Tepui | 5.439484°N 62.392928°W | H. exappendiculata | | Found on summit in marshy savannahs and shrubby forests. |
| Araopán Tepui | 5.439484°N 62.392928°W | H. exappendiculata × H. pulchella | | Occurs in small numbers. |

=== Auyán Massif ===
The Auyán Massif is dominated by Auyán Tepui, a vast U-shaped plateau incised from the north by a deep central valley. It rises from 1600 m in the northwest to 2450 m in the southeast, where the world's highest uninterrupted waterfall, Angel Falls, is located. While Auyán Tepui is one of the largest tepuis, it hosts only a single Heliamphora species, H. minor, of which two varieties are recognised. Both varieties are present on Auyán Tepui itself and on the comparatively tiny Cerro La Luna (1650 m), located off its northern flank.^{[nb c]} Neither has been recorded from nearby Cerro El Sol (1750 m), otherwise known as Wei or Uei Tepui (6.112734°N 62.550329°W). The southernmost component of the Auyán Massif is the 1950 m high Uaipán Tepui or Waipán Tepui (5.654935°N 62.620036°W), which likewise has no recorded Heliamphora.

| Locality | Coordinates | Native taxa | Altitudinal distribution | Distribution notes |
|---|---|---|---|---|
| Auyán Tepui | 5.900189°N 62.541252°W | H. minor var. minor | 1800–2500 m | Unevenly distributed. More abundant towards upper end of altitudinal range and in southern portion of summit plateau. |
| Auyán Tepui | 5.900189°N 62.541252°W | H. minor var. pilosa | 1800 m | Recorded from southern and northern portions of summit plateau. It is unknown whether this variety also grows in the central area of the plateau. |
| Cerro La Luna | 6.101554°N 62.534364°W | H. minor var. minor | 1650 m | Found on summit. |
| Cerro La Luna | 6.101554°N 62.534364°W | H. minor var. pilosa^{[nb c]} | 1650 m | Found on summit. |

=== Chimantá Massif ===
The Chimantá Massif is a huge, highly fragmented complex with a total summit area of 615 square kilometres. It is dissected across the middle by the Río Tírica. The massif is notable for its species richness (among the greatest in the region), for its varied habitat types, and for its elevation, reaching 2698 m on its highest peak, Murey Tepui (Eruoda Tepui). Murey Tepui is joined in the northern portion by Abacapá Tepui, Agparamán Tepui (5.247205°N 62.208075°W), Apacará Tepui, Chimantá Tepui, Tirepón Tepui, and Toronó Tepui (an additional summit, Sarvén Tepui, may also be distinguished around 5.298485°N 62.071432°W). The smaller southern portion comprises Akopán Tepui, Amurí Tepui, and Churí Tepui.

The Chimantá Massif is home to five described species (H. chimantensis, H. exappendiculata, H. huberi, H. pulchella, and H. uncinata) and one undescribed species (H. sp. 'Akopán Tepui'). Many of its species are spread across several adjacent tepuis due to their close geographical proximity.

| Locality | Coordinates | Native taxa | Altitudinal distribution | Distribution notes |
|---|---|---|---|---|
| Abacapá Tepui | 5.184466°N 62.297484°W | H. exappendiculata | | Found on summit in marshy savannahs and shrubby forests. Also grows on cliffs and cliff bases. |
| Abacapá Tepui | 5.184466°N 62.297484°W | H. pulchella | | |
| Akopán Tepui (Acopán Tepui) | 5.181901°N 62.044996°W | H. exappendiculata | | |
| Akopán Tepui (Acopán Tepui) | 5.181901°N 62.044996°W | H. huberi | | Grows in large stands (unlike on other tepuis, where it generally occurs in small, scattered populations). |
| Akopán Tepui (Acopán Tepui) | 5.181901°N 62.044996°W | H. pulchella | | |
| Akopán Tepui (Acopán Tepui) | 5.181901°N 62.044996°W | H. sp. 'Akopán Tepui' | 1800–1900 m | Known only from tepui slopes; apparently absent from summit region. |
| Akopán Tepui (Acopán Tepui) | 5.181901°N 62.044996°W | H. huberi × H. pulchella | | Uncommon, typically occurring as scattered individuals. |
| Akopán Tepui (Acopán Tepui) | 5.181901°N 62.044996°W | H. pulchella × H. sp. 'Akopán Tepui' | | Small number of scattered plants known from tepui slopes. |
| Amurí Tepui | 5.149076°N 62.121214°W | H. exappendiculata | | Found on cliffs along valleys and gorges, particularly around waterfalls and other permanently wet areas. |
| Amurí Tepui | 5.149076°N 62.121214°W | H. huberi | | |
| Amurí Tepui | 5.149076°N 62.121214°W | H. pulchella | | Local plants include specimens lacking long retentive hairs (H. pulchella 'Incompletely diagnosed taxon from Amurí Tepui'). |
| Amurí Tepui | 5.149076°N 62.121214°W | H. uncinata | 1850 m | Known from a single narrow canyon, where it grows on cliff sides and around cliff bases. |
| Amurí Tepui | 5.149076°N 62.121214°W | H. exappendiculata × H. huberi | | Uncommon hybrid. Complex backcrosses have been recorded. |
| Amurí Tepui | 5.149076°N 62.121214°W | H. exappendiculata × H. pulchella | | Occurs in small numbers. |
| Amurí Tepui | 5.149076°N 62.121214°W | H. huberi × H. pulchella | | Uncommon, typically occurring as scattered individuals. |
| Apacará Tepui | 5.320022°N 62.228725°W | H. chimantensis | | Recorded from southeastern portion of tepui. |
| Apacará Tepui | 5.320022°N 62.228725°W | H. exappendiculata | | |
| Apacará Tepui | 5.320022°N 62.228725°W | H. huberi | | |
| Apacará Tepui | 5.320022°N 62.228725°W | H. pulchella | | |
| Apacará Tepui | 5.320022°N 62.228725°W | H. chimantensis × H. pulchella | | Known from summit region. |
| Apacará Tepui | 5.320022°N 62.228725°W | H. huberi × H. pulchella | | Uncommon, typically occurring as scattered individuals. |
| Chimantá Tepui | 5.276948°N 62.131222°W | H. chimantensis | | |
| Chimantá Tepui | 5.276948°N 62.131222°W | H. exappendiculata | | Found on cliffs along valleys and gorges, particularly around waterfalls and other permanently wet areas. |
| Chimantá Tepui | 5.276948°N 62.131222°W | H. huberi | | Known distribution restricted to border area with Toronó Tepui. |
| Chimantá Tepui | 5.276948°N 62.131222°W | H. pulchella | | |
| Chimantá Tepui | 5.276948°N 62.131222°W | H. chimantensis × H. pulchella | | Known from summit region. |
| Chimantá Tepui | 5.276948°N 62.131222°W | H. huberi × H. pulchella | | Known distribution restricted to border area with Toronó Tepui. Uncommon, typically occurring as scattered individuals. |
| Churí Tepui | 5.253358°N 62.011351°W | H. exappendiculata | | |
| Churí Tepui | 5.253358°N 62.011351°W | H. pulchella | | |
| Murey Tepui (Eruoda Tepui) | 5.376765°N 62.093456°W | H. pulchella | | |
| Tirepón Tepui | 5.367707°N 62.019908°W | H. pulchella | | |
| Toronó Tepui | 5.211648°N 62.175802°W | H. exappendiculata | | |
| Toronó Tepui | 5.211648°N 62.175802°W | H. huberi | | Known distribution restricted to border area with Chimantá Tepui. |
| Toronó Tepui | 5.211648°N 62.175802°W | H. pulchella | | |
| Toronó Tepui | 5.211648°N 62.175802°W | H. huberi × H. pulchella | | Known distribution restricted to border area with Chimantá Tepui. Uncommon, typically occurring as scattered individuals. |

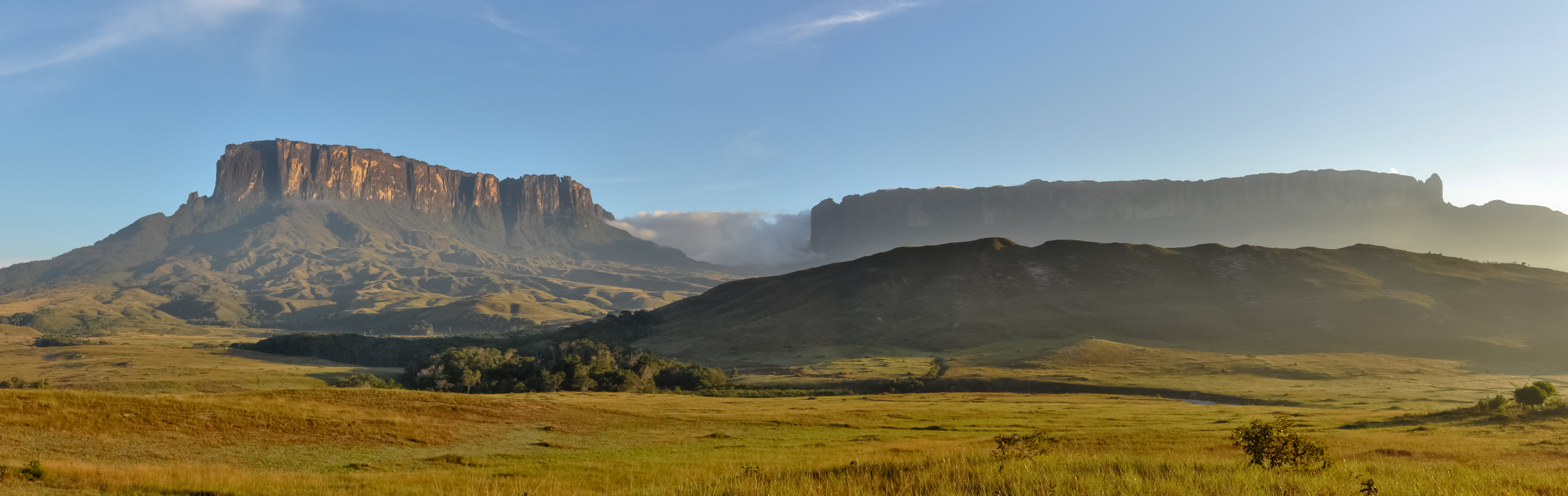
Kukenán Tepui (left) and Mount Roraima, the two most visited of the Eastern Tepuis. The Tëk River and the relatively dry grasslands of the Gran Sabana are visible in the foreground.

=== Eastern Tepuis ===
The Eastern Tepuis chain, or Roraima–Ilú range, stretches in a northwesterly direction from the tripoint of Brazil, Guyana, and Venezuela, closely following the Guyana–Venezuela border, with an isolated double-peaked plateau (Serra do Sol or Uei Tepui) to the south. Moving in a northwesterly direction from Serra do Sol (2150 m), the major summits of this chain are Mount Roraima (2810 m), Kukenán Tepui (2650 m), Yuruaní Tepui (2400 m), Wadakapiapué Tepui (2000 m), Karaurín Tepui (2500 m), Ilú Tepui (2700 m), and Tramen Tepui. With the exception of the tiny Wadakapiapué Tepui (5.316261°N 60.923017°W), all of these peaks are known to support Heliamphora. The Eastern Tepuis chain includes some of the most widely visited tepuis, particularly Roraima and nearby Kukenán. The Ilú (Uru) and Tramen Tepuis are treated here as a single locality since they are joined by a common base and share the same assemblage of Heliamphora taxa.

Five closely allied species are recognised from this region—H. arenicola, H. elongata, H. glabra, H. ionasi, and H. nutans—all of which are endemic.

| Locality | Coordinates | Native taxa | Altitudinal distribution | Distribution notes |
|---|---|---|---|---|
| Ilú–Tramen Massif | 5.410262°N 61.006594°W | H. arenicola | ?–2000 m | Found on western slopes and foothills of Ilú–Tramen Massif. Lower altitudinal limit is not known, but type specimen was collected at elevation of around 1500 m. |
| Ilú–Tramen Massif | 5.410262°N 61.006594°W | H. elongata | | Found on summits of Ilú and Tramen Tepuis and on surrounding slopes. |
| Ilú–Tramen Massif | 5.410262°N 61.006594°W | H. ionasi | 1800–2600 m | Most abundant in the valley between Ilú and Tramen Tepuis, where it grows both at the base of cliffs and on cliff faces. Only a small number of stunted plants are known from the summits of the Ilú–Tramen Massif. Its altitudinal limits and the full extent of its distribution remain unknown. |
| Ilú–Tramen Massif | 5.410262°N 61.006594°W | H. arenicola × H. ionasi | | Scattered individuals found on flanks of massif. |
| Ilú–Tramen Massif | 5.410262°N 61.006594°W | H. elongata × H. ionasi | | Very common in valley between Ilú and Tramen Tepuis, where it may locally outnumber its parent species. Complex backcrosses are common. |
| Karaurín Tepui (Caraurín Tepui) | 5.357623°N 61.005077°W | ?H. arenicola | | Presence suggested by herbarium specimen of putative H. arenicola × H. ionasi hybrid collected on western shoulder of Karaurín Tepui at 1950 m altitude. |
| Karaurín Tepui (Caraurín Tepui) | 5.357623°N 61.005077°W | H. elongata | | Robust, wide-pitchered form grows on summit. |
| Karaurín Tepui (Caraurín Tepui) | 5.357623°N 61.005077°W | ?H. ionasi | | Presence suggested by herbarium specimen of putative H. arenicola × H. ionasi hybrid collected on western shoulder of Karaurín Tepui at 1950 m altitude. |
| Karaurín Tepui (Caraurín Tepui) | 5.357623°N 61.005077°W | ? H. arenicola × H. ionasi | | Presence suggested by putative herbarium specimen collected on western shoulder at 1950 m altitude. |
| Kukenán Tepui (Matauí Tepui, Matawí Tepui) | 5.203442°N 60.827917°W | H. nutans | | Found mostly around edges of mountain and on upper tepui cliffs. |
| "Maringma Tepui" | ^{[nb d]} | H. glabra | | Large population found on summit. Also present on minor plateaus nearby, which form a chain between Serra do Sol and Mount Roraima. |
| "Maringma Tepui" | ^{[nb d]} | H. nutans | 2000–2065 m | Lowest-growing population known, found just below the summit of the plateau. Also present on minor plateaus nearby, which form a chain between Serra do Sol and Mount Roraima. |
| "Maringma Tepui" | ^{[nb d]} | H. glabra × H. nutans | | Very common and fertile at this locality; may outnumber parent species. Complex backcrosses reported. |
| Mount Roraima (Roraima Tepui, Roroima Tepui) | 5.180192°N 60.748266°W | H. glabra | 1200–2750 m | Found in small, scattered populations in northern portion of summit plateau (including around tripoint). Growing at roughly 2750 m, these stunted plants represent the upper altitudinal limit of the species. Lowest altitude populations (1200 m) grow on slopes off the mountain's northern flank. Distribution may similarly extend eastwards from Mount Roraima, but this requires confirmation. |
| Mount Roraima (Roraima Tepui, Roroima Tepui) | 5.180192°N 60.748266°W | H. nutans | | Found mostly around edges of mountain and on upper tepui cliffs. Summit plateau hosts highest-growing population of this species, at 2700 m. Originally discovered in "El Dorado Swamp" off Mount Roraima's southern flank, but this population has not been relocated since its discovery and was possibly destroyed by fires. |
| Mount Roraima (Roraima Tepui, Roroima Tepui) | 5.180192°N 60.748266°W | H. glabra × H. nutans | | Grows in northern part of summit plateau in apparently sterile clumps. Complex backcrosses reported. |
| Serra do Sol (Uei Tepui, Wei Tepui, Cerro El Sol, Serra da Sol) | 5.017075°N 60.615406°W | H. glabra | 1800–2100 m | Summit supports the largest known populations of this species, unusually consisting of predominantly green-pitchered plants. Only known Venezuelan locality for this species is at the southern end of the plateau. |
| Wei Assipu Tepui (Roraimita, Little Roraima) | 5.218828°N 60.705013°W | H. glabra | | Found on summit. Likely to grow around base also, but this requires confirmation. |
| Wei Assipu Tepui (Roraimita, Little Roraima) | 5.218828°N 60.705013°W | H. nutans | | Found on upper tepui cliffs. |
| Wei Assipu Tepui (Roraimita, Little Roraima) | 5.218828°N 60.705013°W | H. glabra × H. nutans | | Complex backcrosses reported. |
| Yuruaní Tepui | 5.313612°N 60.863327°W | H. nutans | | A diminutive form grows on this mountain. Found on upper tepui cliffs. |

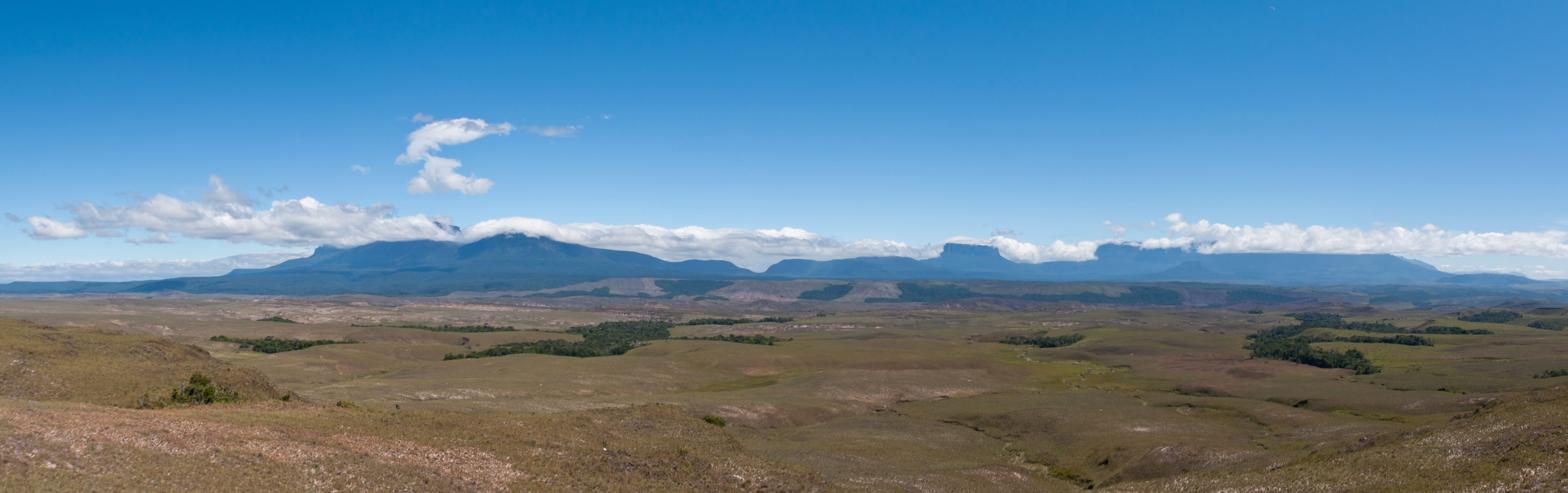
Panoramic view of the Eastern Tepuis chain. From left to right: Tramen Tepui, Ilú Tepui, Karaurín Tepui, Wadakapiapué Tepui (obscured by clouds), Yuruaní Tepui, Kukenán Tepui, and Mount Roraima (obscured by Kukenán and clouds).

=== Los Testigos ===
Los Testigos, or the Aparamán range, is a chain of four rather small and floristically similar tepuis forming a bridge between Auyán Tepui in the west and Ptari Tepui in the east. From west to east the four major peaks are: Aparamán Tepui (2100 m), Murisipán Tepui (2350 m), Tereke-yurén Tepui (1900 m), and Kamarkawarai Tepui (2400 m), the latter three sharing a common slope area. There however remains some confusion in the literature regarding the names of these peaks.^{[nb e]}

Two closely related species are recognised from Los Testigos—H. collina and H. folliculata—both of which are endemic or almost so (see Ptari Tepui).

In line with and to the west of the Los Testigos chain lies the Los Hermanos massif, which consists of two upland peaks: Amaruay Tepui (5.916239°N 62.245497°W) and Padapué Tepui (5.910775°N 62.196402°W). No Heliamphora have been recorded from this group.

| Locality | Coordinates | Native taxa | Altitudinal distribution | Distribution notes |
|---|---|---|---|---|
| Aparamán Tepui | 5.887041°N 62.130976°W | H. collina | | Restricted to foothills at base of tepui. |
| Aparamán Tepui | 5.887041°N 62.130976°W | H. folliculata | | Found on summit and rocky overhangs on sides of tepui. |
| Kamarkawarai Tepui (Camarcai-barai Tepui) | 5.870904°N 62.001958°W | H. collina | | Restricted to foothills at base of tepui. |
| Kamarkawarai Tepui (Camarcai-barai Tepui) | 5.870904°N 62.001958°W | H. folliculata | | Found on summit and rocky overhangs on sides of tepui. |
| Murisipán Tepui (Murosipán Tepui, Murochiopán Tepui) | 5.869623°N 62.075529°W | H. collina | | Restricted to foothills at base of tepui. |
| Murisipán Tepui (Murosipán Tepui, Murochiopán Tepui) | 5.869623°N 62.075529°W | H. folliculata | | Found on summit and rocky overhangs on sides of tepui. |
| Tereke-yurén Tepui | 5.870605°N 62.049501°W | H. collina | | Restricted to foothills at base of tepui. |
| Tereke-yurén Tepui | 5.870605°N 62.049501°W | ?H. folliculata | | Summit has not been searched for this species, but its presence there may be expected. |

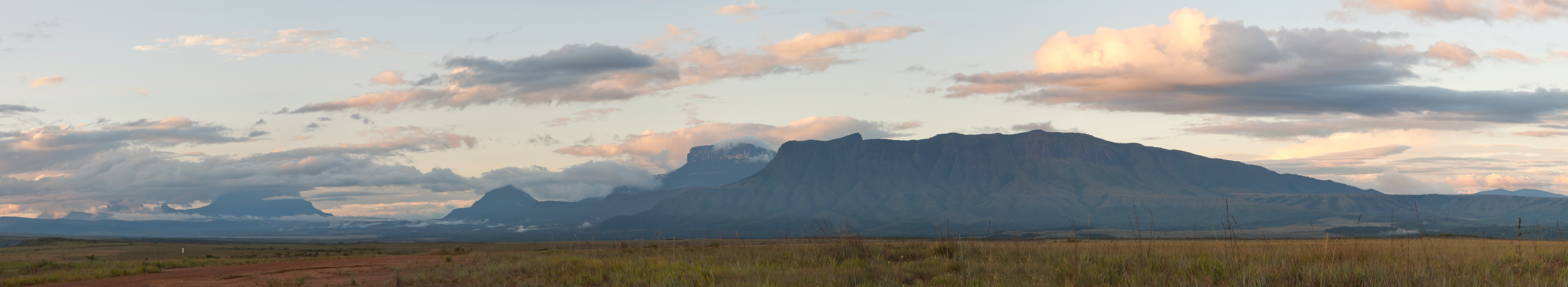
View from Kavanayén in the Gran Sabana, looking northwards. The large forested ridge taking up much of the frame is Sororopán Tepui, with Ptari Tepui visible just behind. Moving left is Moná Tepui and then, off in the distance, the Los Testigos chain, beginning with Kamarkawarai Tepui.

=== Ptari Tepui ===
Ptari Tepui (2400 m) is a relatively isolated tepui to the east of the Los Testigos chain. It forms part of the Ptari Massif, which also includes the 2200 m high Carrao Tepui (Karrao Tepui) (5.792434°N 61.769528°W) to the northeast and the 10 km long ridge known as Sororopán Tepui (2050 m) (5.694309°N 61.760345°W) to the southeast. Of the three, only Ptari Tepui has an open, rocky summit mostly free of vegetation cover, and only this peak is known to host Heliamphora.

Two species are known with certainty from Ptari Tepui (H. purpurascens and H. sarracenioides, both endemic) and a further two (H. collina and H. heterodoxa) may also be present.

| Locality | Coordinates | Native taxa | Altitudinal distribution | Distribution notes |
|---|---|---|---|---|
| Ptari Tepui (Pu-tari Tepui, Cerro Budare) | 5.766986°N 61.810999°W | ?H. collina | | Reportedly observed on mountain, but this requires confirmation. |
| Ptari Tepui (Pu-tari Tepui, Cerro Budare) | 5.766986°N 61.810999°W | ?H. heterodoxa | 2000–2200 m | Collected from "southwest-facing shoulder" of Ptari Tepui in 1944; this population has not been relocated since its discovery. |
| Ptari Tepui (Pu-tari Tepui, Cerro Budare) | 5.766986°N 61.810999°W | H. purpurascens | 2400–2500 m | Restricted to flat summit. |
| Ptari Tepui (Pu-tari Tepui, Cerro Budare) | 5.766986°N 61.810999°W | H. sarracenioides | 2400–2450 m | Restricted to flat summit. |
| Ptari Tepui (Pu-tari Tepui, Cerro Budare) | 5.766986°N 61.810999°W | H. purpurascens × H. sarracenioides | | Restricted to flat summit. Complex backcrosses are common and may outnumber the parent species in some areas. |

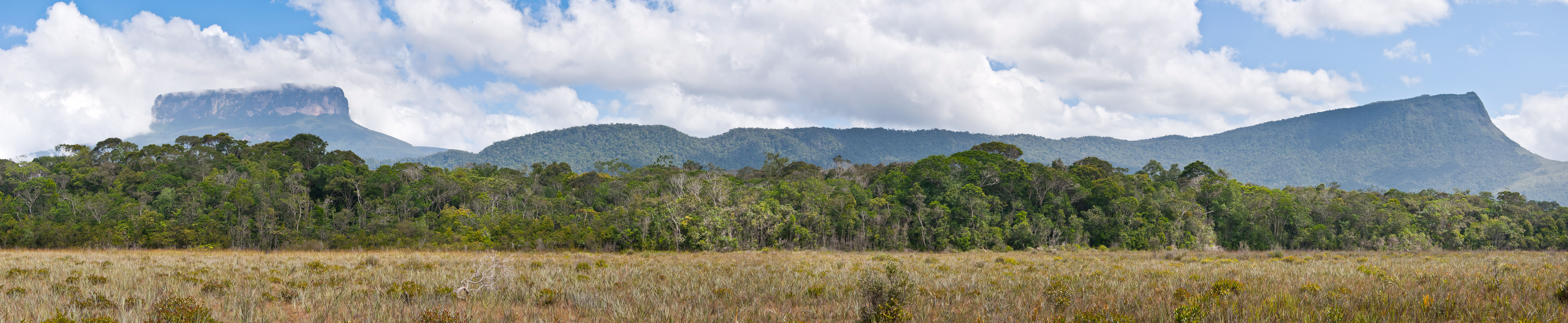
The flat, symmetrical peak on the left is Ptari Tepui, with the long southwestern face of Sororopán Tepui extending to the right.

=== Uplands ===
The uplands of the Venezuelan Guayana are regarded as those areas with an elevation of approximately 500–1500 m, with higher elevations being highland and lower ones lowland.

The Gran Sabana (literally "Great Savannah") is a vast area of tropical uplands covering nearly 30,000 km^{2}, which surrounds many of the tepuis of the eastern range. It gradually rises in elevation from 750 m in the south to 1450 m in the north. The rocky uplands of Sierra de Lema and Sierra Senkopirén lie to the north and northwest of the Gran Sabana and surround the Auyán Massif. They have an elevational range of around 700 to 1650 m. Cerro Venamo is a sandstone mountain near the border between Venezuela and Guyana, at the northeastern tip of the Gran Sabana. With a height of 1600 m it falls somewhere between an upland and a true highland area. As with many other localities in the Guayana Highlands, the name Cerro Venamo has been inconsistently applied to a number of adjacent areas.^{[nb f]}

Heliamphora ciliata is endemic to these upland areas and H. heterodoxa may also be (though see Ptari Tepui).^{[nb g]}

| Locality | Coordinates | Native taxa | Altitudinal distribution | Distribution notes |
|---|---|---|---|---|
| "Cerro Venamo" | ^{[nb f]} | H. heterodoxa | 1600 m | This area is likely to harbour as yet undiscovered populations of this species. |
| Gran Sabana | 5.3°N 61.5°W | H. ciliata | 900 m | Known from several swampy meadows northeast of Aprada Tepui. |
| Gran Sabana | 5.3°N 61.5°W | H. heterodoxa | | Found in marshy savannah off eastern base of Ptari Tepui and near La Luepa military base and the village of Kavanayén. |
| Sierra de Lema | 6.2°N 62.0°W | H. heterodoxa | 1200–1650 m | This area is likely to harbour as yet undiscovered populations of this species. |

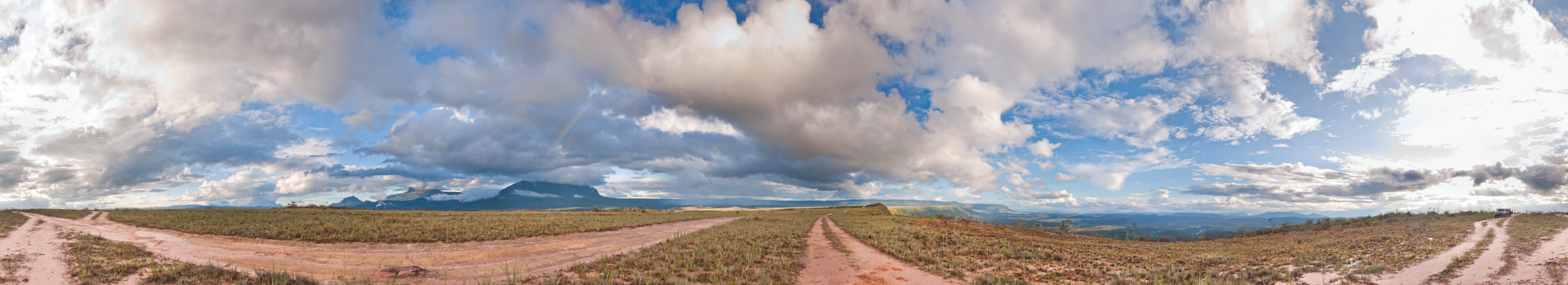
A typical landscape of the Gran Sabana as seen from Kavanayén. The tepuis in the distance are (moving left): Sororopán Tepui, Ptari Tepui, Moná Tepui, and far off in the distance, Kamarkawarai Tepui and the rest of the Los Testigos chain.

== Notes ==
a. The altitudinal distribution of H. ceracea is not specified in Sarraceniaceae of South America, either in the species profile or the formal description, but the holotype was collected at an elevation of 1900 m.

b. For 39 years, based on an uncontested measurement performed in 1965 by topographer José Ambrósio de Miranda Pombo, using a theodolite, the elevation of Pico da Neblina was thought to be 3,014 metres (9,888 ft), but a much more accurate measurement performed in 2004 with state-of-the-art GPS equipment by cartographer Marco Aurélio de Almeida Lima, a member of a Brazilian army expedition, puts it at 2,994 m (9,823 ft). This is now recognised by the Brazilian Institute of Geography and Statistics (IBGE), the federal government's official geographic survey and census agency, which jointly organised the expedition. The height of Pico 31 de Março / Pico Phelps was similarly reduced from 2,992 m (9,816 ft) to 2,973 m (9,754 ft).

c. There is some discrepancy between published sources with respect to the distribution of H. minor var. pilosa: the formal description of Fleischmann & Grande Allende (2012) states that this variety is endemic to the northern portion of the summit plateau of Auyán Tepui, while in Sarraceniaceae of South America (co-authored by Fleischmann) its range is said to encompass both Auyán Tepui and Cerro La Luna, with photographs from both localities included.

d. The maps provided in Sarraceniaceae of South America place Maringma Tepui on the Brazil–Venezuela border some distance southeast of Mount Roraima, but other published sources place it just inside Guyana near the border with Brazil, around 17 km east of Mount Roraima (5.216434°N 60.585165°W). In Sarraceniaceae of South America it is stated that Maringma Tepui was previously incorrectly called "Mount Yakontipu" by Fleischmann et al. (2007) in their description of Drosera solaris.

e. Otto Huber summarised this muddled toponymy as follows: "There is, however, confusion concerning the precise names of the two central mountains; according to Brewer-Carías (1978), Murochiopán-tepui is the name of a smaller lateral mountain of Aparamán [5.875429°N 62.113452°W], followed to the east by the high Tereke Yurén-tepui and the lower Tucuy-wo-cuyén-tepui, whereas members of the Terramar Foundation expeditions (Steyermark 1986a; Holst 1987; George 1988) apply the name Murisipán-tepui to Brewer's Tereke Yurén-tepui, and the name Tereke-yurén-tepui to Brewer's Tucuy-wo-cuyén-tepui, omitting the name of the smaller lateral mountain of Aparamán-tepui." A yet different sequence (and spelling) of names can be found in, for example, the formal description of H. folliculata, namely: Murosipan, Aparaman, Tereke-Yuren, and Kamarkaiwaran.

f. The locality commonly known today as Cerro Venamo (5.97°N 61.41°W), which forms part of the international boundary between Guyana and Venezuela, does not correspond to the mountain originally given this name by Julian Alfred Steyermark. The latter is known to host Heliamphora while the former is not.

g. This assumes that the high slope- and summit-growing H. sp. 'Akopán Tepui' and H. sp. 'Angasima Tepui' are not conspecific with H. heterodoxa.
