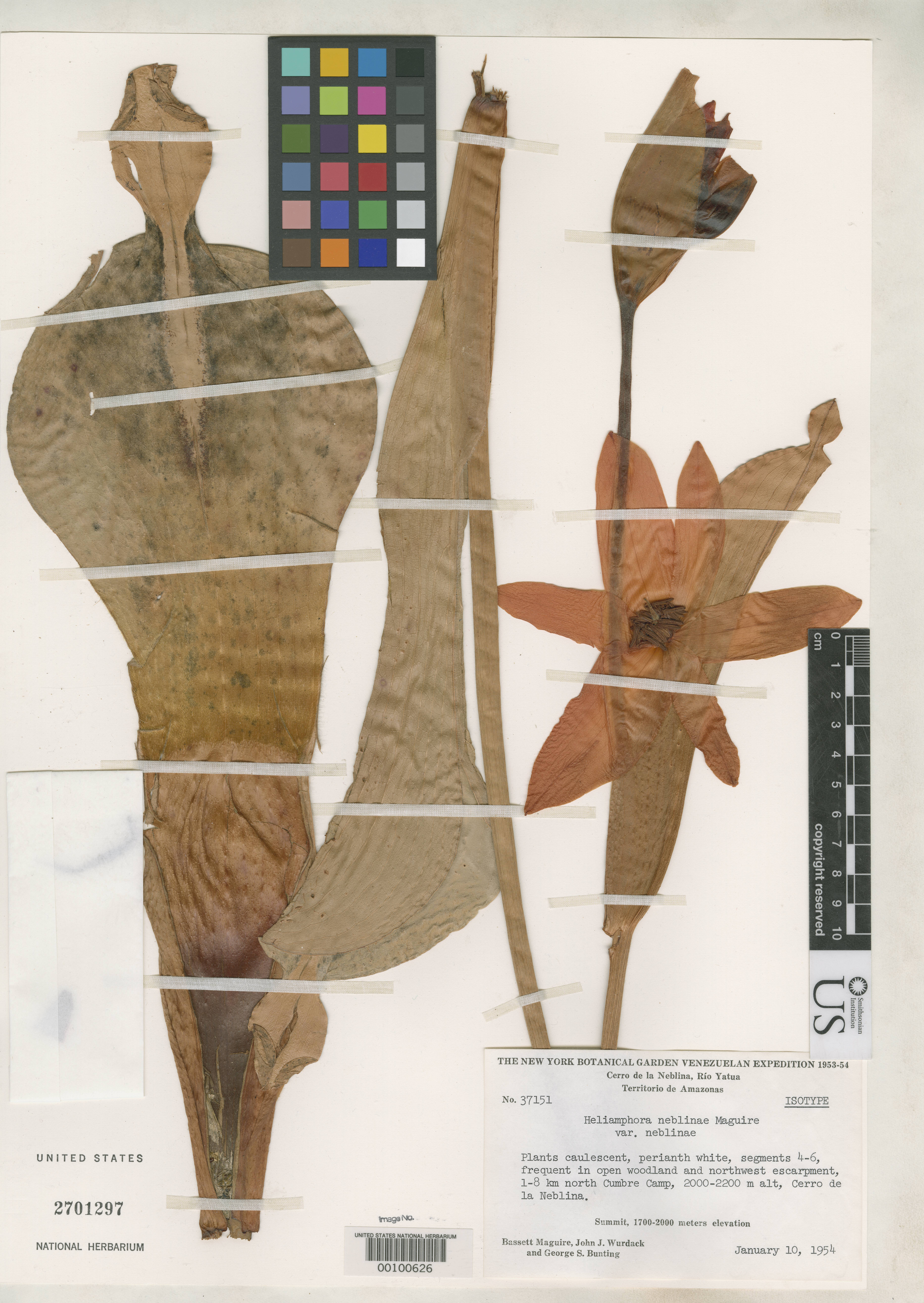
- Isotype held at the NMNH

Scientific classification
- Kingdom: Plantae
- Clade: Tracheophytes
- Clade: Angiosperms
- Clade: Eudicots
- Clade: Asterids
- Order: Ericales
- Family: Sarraceniaceae
- Genus: Heliamphora
- Species: H. neblinae

Binomial name
- Heliamphora neblinae Maguire (1978)

Synonyms
- Heliamphora tatei var. neblinae (Maguire) Steyerm. (1984)

= Heliamphora neblinae =

Species of carnivorous plant

Heliamphora neblinae is a species of marsh pitcher plant endemic to Cerro de la Neblina, Cerro Aracamuni and Cerro Avispa in Venezuela. It is one of the most variable species in the genus and was once considered to be a variety of H. tatei. It is unclear whether or not there is a consensus regarding its status as a species, with at least a few researchers supporting the taxonomic revision that would elevate both H. tatei var. neblinae and H. tatei f. macdonaldae to full species status.

The pitchers of H. neblinae are some of the largest in the genus, occasionally exceeding 50 cm.

== Infraspecific taxa ==
- Heliamphora neblinae var. parva Maguire (1978) [=H. parva]
- Heliamphora neblinae var. viridis Maguire (1978) [=H. parva]
