= Los Testigos =

Venezuelan mountain chain

- Location within Venezuela

Highest point
- Peak: Kamarkawarai-tepui
- Elevation: 2,400 m (7,900 ft)

Geography
- Location: Bolívar, Venezuela
- Range coordinates: 05°52′N 62°03′W

Los Testigos, also known as the Aparamán range, is a mountain chain in Bolívar, Venezuela. It consists of four rather small tepuis, forming a bridge between the giant Auyán-tepui to the west and Ptari-tepui to the east. The four major peaks of Los Testigos are (west to east): Aparamán-tepui (2,100 m), Murisipán-tepui (2,350 m), Tereke-yurén-tepui (1,900 m), and Kamarkawarai-tepui (2,400 m), the latter three sharing a common slope area. There however remains some confusion in the literature regarding the names of these peaks.^{[nb a]}

The Los Testigos chain has a total summit area of around 12 km^{2} (4.6 sq mi) and an estimated slope area of 116 km^{2} (45 sq mi) (the collective slope area of the three eastern tepuis being around 88 km^{2} (34 sq mi), with the isolated Aparamán-tepui contributing a further 28 km^{2} (11 sq mi)). The chain is situated entirely within the bounds of Canaima National Park.

In line with and to the west of the Los Testigos chain lies the Los Hermanos massif, which consists of two upland peaks: Amaruay-tepui and Padapué-tepui. Both massifs are located northeast of the Catholic mission at Kamarata.

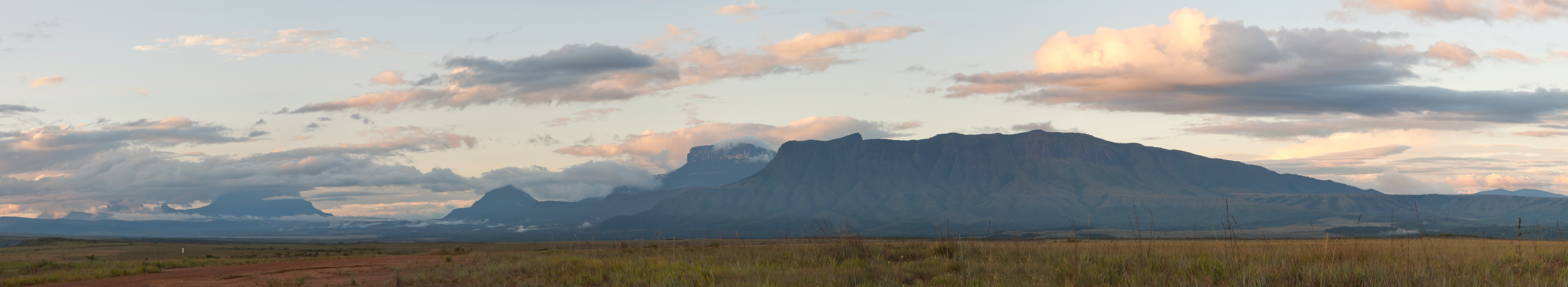
Panoramic view from Kavanayén in the Gran Sabana, looking northwards. The large forested ridge taking up much of the frame is Sororopán-tepui, with Ptari-tepui visible just behind. Moving left is Moná-tepui and then, off in the distance, the Los Testigos chain, beginning with Kamarkawarai-tepui.

== See also ==
- Distribution of Heliamphora

== Notes ==
a. Otto Huber summarised this toponymic confusion as follows: "There is, however, confusion concerning the precise names of the two central mountains; according to Brewer-Carías (1978), Murochiopán-tepui is the name of a smaller lateral mountain of Aparamán, followed to the east by the high Tereke Yurén-tepui and the lower Tucuy-wo-cuyén-tepui, whereas members of the Terramar Foundation expeditions (Steyermark 1986a; Holst 1987; George 1988) apply the name Murisipán-tepui to Brewer's Tereke Yurén-tepui, and the name Tereke-yurén-tepui to Brewer's Tucuy-wo-cuyén-tepui, omitting the name of the smaller lateral mountain of Aparamán-tepui." A yet different sequence (and spelling) of names can be found in, for example, the formal description of Heliamphora folliculata, namely: Murosipan, Aparaman, Tereke-Yuren, and Kamarkaiwaran.
