= Heliamphora exappendiculata =

- Heliamphora exappendiculata in cultivation

Scientific classification
- Kingdom: Plantae
- Clade: Tracheophytes
- Clade: Angiosperms
- Clade: Eudicots
- Clade: Asterids
- Order: Ericales
- Family: Sarraceniaceae
- Genus: Heliamphora
- Species: H. exappendiculata

Binomial name
- Heliamphora exappendiculata (Maguire & Steyerm.); Nerz & Wistuba (2006)

Synonyms
- Heliamphora heterodoxa var. exappendiculata Maguire & Steyerm. (1978)

Species of carnivorous plant

Heliamphora exappendiculata (Latin: ex = without, appendicula = small appendage) is a species of marsh pitcher plant native to the Chimantá and Aprada Massifs of Bolívar state, Venezuela. It was for a long time considered a variety of H. heterodoxa, but has recently been raised to species rank. Pitchers collect insects on flattened pitcher mouths which function as 'landing platforms' upon which prey falls from surrounding vegetation. Also, the pitcher shape effectively collects leaf litter and organic debris which may serve as additional source of nutrition for plants, similarly to H. ionasi. H. exappendiculata hybridizes naturally with H. pulchella and H. huberi in areas within which they grow together. This species occurs in shaded conditions, apparently preferring them over other habitats. In addition, plants upon Chimanta and Amuri Tepui grow directly upon the walls of gorges and ravines where surfaces are permanently wet. In contrast to those populations, on all other tepuis and massif regions the species grows on summit savannahs and stunted or shrubby forests, though these individuals represent a minority in habitat choice.
