= Tereke-yurén-tepui =

- Location within Venezuela

Highest point
- Elevation: 1,900 m (6,200 ft)
- Coordinates: 05°52′14″N 62°02′58″W

Geography
- Location: Bolívar, Venezuela

Tereke-yurén-tepui is one of the four main tepuis of the Los Testigos chain in Bolívar, Venezuela. Looking west to east, it is the third major peak of the massif and is connected to Murisipán-tepui and Kamarkawarai-tepui by a common basement (the westernmost peak, Aparamán-tepui, is relatively isolated by comparison). With a summit area of 0.63 km^{2} (0.24 sq mi) and an elevation of around 1,900 metres (6,200 ft), Tereke-yurén-tepui is both the smallest and lowest of the four peaks. Its summit plateau comprises mostly bare rock.

In his 1978 book, La Vegetación del Mundo Perdido, Charles Brewer-Carías applied the name Tereke Yurén-tepui to what is now generally known as Murisipán-tepui and used Tucuy-wo-cuyén-tepui for the smallest of the four main peaks: what is now known as Tereke-yurén-tepui.

== See also ==
- Distribution of Heliamphora
