= Ceuthomantis aracamuni =

Conservation status
- Vulnerable (IUCN 3.1)

Scientific classification
- Kingdom: Animalia
- Phylum: Chordata
- Class: Amphibia
- Order: Anura
- Family: Ceuthomantidae
- Genus: Ceuthomantis
- Species: C. aracamuni

Binomial name
- Ceuthomantis aracamuni (Barrio-Amorós and Molina, 2006)
- Ceuthomantis aracamuni is only known from Cerro Aracamuni, Venezuela

Synonyms
- Eleutherodactylus aracamuni Barrio-Amorós and Molina, 2006; Pristimantis aracamuni (Barrio-Amorós and Molina, 2006)

Species of frog

Ceuthomantis aracamuni, also known as the Cerro Aracamuni emerald-barred frog, is a species of frog in the family Ceuthomantidae. It is endemic to Cerro Aracamuni in southern Amazonas, Venezuela.

== Description ==
The type series consists of two individuals. The holotype is a subadult male measuring 18 mm (0.7 in) in snout–vent length. The paratype is a juvenile measuring 14 mm (0.6 in) in snout–vent length. The head is wider than the body. The snout is subovoid in dorsal view and truncate in profile. The tympanum is distinct. The finger tips have broad discs. The toe discs are smaller than the finger ones. No lateral keels nor webbing are present. The dorsum is yellowish green with brown spots. The limbs are dorsally reddish brown with green. There is a brick red canthal stripe and an ochre supratympanic stripe. The belly is blackish brown with white spots.

== Distribution and habitat ==
Ceuthomantis aracamuni is only known from the type series collected from Cerro Aracamuni at 1,493 m (4,898 ft) above sea level. It is likely that this species also occurs in the adjacent Cerro Avispa, which shares its slopes with Cerro Aracamuni. Together, these give 238 km^{2} potential habitat area above 1,500 m, and more if the slopes are included.

Cerro Aracamuni is a granitic mountain (rather than sandstone, as typical for tepuis). The types were found on a moss patch on a rocky talus by a small tannic-water creek (2 m wide) with a rocky bed. The stream ran in a dwarf gallery forest (2.5 m canopy height).

== Conservation ==
The known range of this species is within the Serranía de la Neblina National Park. Furthermore, the summit of Cerro Aracamuni is remote and undisturbed. However, there is illegal mining activity at the base of this mountain. If this activity spreads higher up, or the range of Ceuthomantis aracamuni includes the lower slopes, then mining will be a threat to this species. Also climate change is potentially threatening this high-altitude species and its habitat. Moreover, species with restricted ranges are vulnerable to novel pathogens.
