= Murisipán-tepui =

Tepui in Bolívar, Venezuela

- Location within Venezuela

Highest point
- Elevation: 2,350 m (7,710 ft)
- Coordinates: 05°52′11″N 62°04′32″W

Geography
- Location: Bolívar, Venezuela

Murisipán-tepui, also spelled Murosipán or Murochiopán, is one of the four main tepuis of the Los Testigos chain in Bolívar, Venezuela. Looking west to east, it is the second major peak of the massif and is connected to the next two—Tereke-yurén-tepui and Kamarkawarai-tepui—by a common basement (the westernmost peak, Aparamán-tepui, is relatively isolated by comparison). Murisipán-tepui has an elevation of around 2,350 metres (7,700 ft) and a summit area of 5 km^{2} (1.9 sq mi). The mountain's mostly bare summit plateau has a small, seasonal lagoon near its centre.

In his 1978 book, La Vegetación del Mundo Perdido, Charles Brewer-Carías applied the name Murochiopán-tepui to a smaller lateral peak of Aparamán-tepui (05°52′32″N 62°06′48″W), calling the high summit immediately east of it Tereke Yurén-tepui and the tiny peak east of that, Tucuy-wo-cuyén-tepui. Subsequent authors have generally used Murisipán-tepui (or its variants) for the second of the four main peaks, and Tereke-yurén-tepui for the third, with the lateral mountain of Aparamán-tepui going unnamed.

The frog species Anomaloglossus murisipanensis is only known from Murisipán-tepui.

== See also ==
- Distribution of Heliamphora
