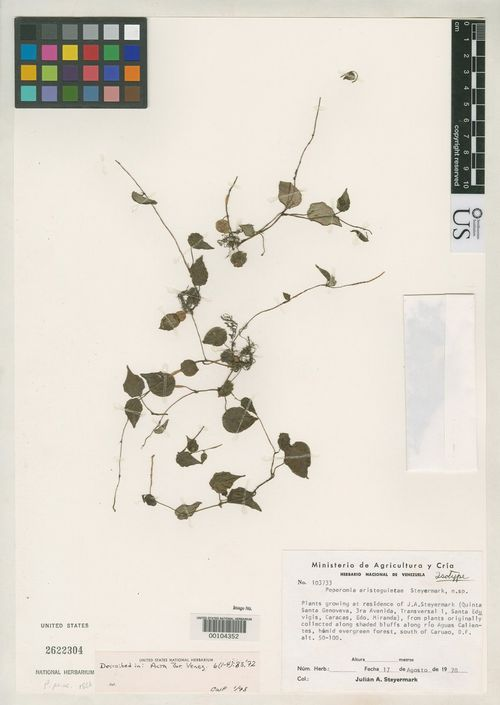

Scientific classification
- Kingdom: Plantae
- Clade: Tracheophytes
- Clade: Angiosperms
- Clade: Magnoliids
- Order: Piperales
- Family: Piperaceae
- Genus: Peperomia
- Species: P. aristeguietae

Binomial name
- Peperomia aristeguietae Steyerm.

= Peperomia aristeguietae =

Species of epiphyte

Peperomia aristeguietae is a species of epiphyte in the genus Peperomia that is endemic in Venezuela. It grows on wet tropical biomes. Its conservation status is Threatened.

== Description ==
The type specimen was collected near Rio Aguas Calientes, Venezuela at an altitude of 50-100 meters.

Peperomia aristeguietae is a perennial herb. The sterile stems creep along the ground, while the fertile stems are ascending. All stems are wine-red, hairless, fleshy, and 1.5 to 2 millimeters in diameter. The lower internodes, or spaces between leaves, are 1.7 to 3.5 centimeters long. The lower and middle petioles are 1 to 5.5 centimeters long, while the upper petioles are much shorter at 4 to 7 millimeters long. All petioles are hairless and wine-red. The leaf blades are slightly leathery, fleshy, and hairless on both sides. The underside of the leaf is pale green or silvery. The leaf blade is attached 4 to 6 millimeters above the base, meaning the leaf is peltate like a shield on a stick. Each leaf has seven veins radiating from the attachment point like fingers on a hand. The leaf shape is oval or nearly oval, 2 to 4 centimeters long and 1.2 to 3 centimeters wide. The tip is sharp or somewhat pointed, and the base is rounded or slightly indented. The veins on the upper side are shallowly grooved, while on the underside they are slightly sunken. The flower spikes are erect, solitary, and grow from the leaf axils at the branch tips or at the very end of the stem. The spikes are thin, 2.5 to 3.5 centimeters long and only 1 millimeter in diameter, with dense flowers. At the time of flowering, the base of the spike is green and the rest is white. Each spike has a thin peduncle, which is 7 to 15 millimeters long, pale green or dark magenta, and hairless, as is the spike's central axis. The flower bracts are tiny, broadly nearly round to nearly triangular, blunt or rounded, and shorter than the ovary. The anthers are white, nearly round to oblong, and 0.3 millimeters long, with white filaments. The stigma is at the tip and is rounded and breast-shaped. The ovary is stalkless and papillose, meaning covered with tiny bumps. The fruit is a nearly round to egg-shaped drupe that is stalkless and hairless.

According to Yuncker's Piperaceae of Northern South America, this species belongs to the group with distinctly peltate leaves, but it does not match any described species. Compared to P. lanceolatopeltata, This species differs by having elongated, prostrate or sprawling stems and internodes, hairless stems, leaves, flower stalks, and spike axes, and shallow nearly round to nearly triangular bracts instead of round shield-shaped peltate bracts. Compared to the P. immolata and P. peltaphylla, this species can be distinguished by its shorter leaf stalks and leaf blades, more slender stems, leaves with 7 veins instead of 9 to 11 veins, shorter spikes, and bracts that are not round and peltate. Overall, this new species can be characterized by its elongated sprawling or creeping stems, peltate leaves, complete hairlessness of all parts, tip-located stigmas, stalkless ovary, and oval leaf blades that are rounded at the base, sharp or somewhat pointed at the tip, and have seven palmately radiating veins.

== Taxonomy and naming ==
It was described in 1971 by Julian Alfred Steyermark in Acta Botanica Venezuelica 6, from the specimen collected by Steyermark himself. The epithet aristeguietae honors Leandro Aristeguieta, a Venezuelan botanist.

== Distribution and habitat ==
It is endemic in Venezuela. It grows on a epiphyte environment and is a herb. It grows on wet tropical biomes.

== Conservation ==
This species is assessed as Threatened.
