= Kamarkawarai-tepui =

Mountain in Venezuela

- Location within Venezuela

Highest point
- Elevation: 2,400 m (7,900 ft)
- Coordinates: 05°52′15″N 62°00′07″W

Geography
- Location: Bolívar, Venezuela

Kamarkawarai-tepui, also spelled Kamarkaiwaran or Camarcai-barai, is the easternmost and tallest of the four main tepuis of the Los Testigos chain in Bolívar, Venezuela. It is connected to the two nearest peaks of the massif—Murisipán-tepui and Tereke-yurén-tepui—by a common basement (the westernmost peak, Aparamán-tepui, is relatively isolated by comparison). The mostly bare summit plateau of Kamarkawarai-tepui has a large, collapsed sinkhole opening in its western portion.

Kamarkawarai-tepui has an elevation of around 2,400 metres (7,900 ft) and a summit area of 5 km^{2} (1.9 sq mi).

== See also ==
- Distribution of Heliamphora
