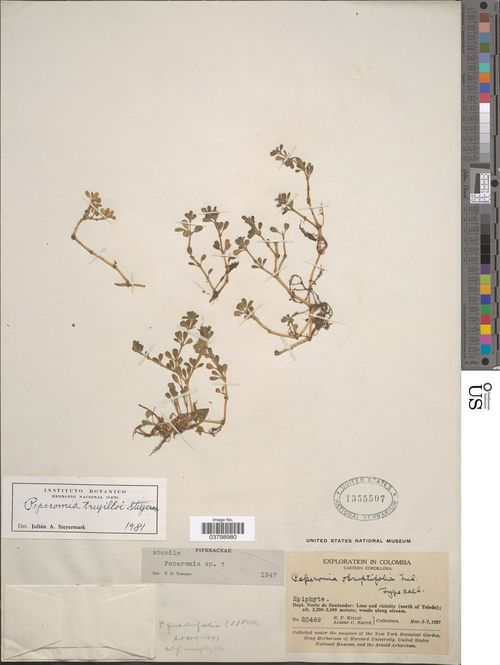

Scientific classification
- Kingdom: Plantae
- Clade: Tracheophytes
- Clade: Angiosperms
- Clade: Magnoliids
- Order: Piperales
- Family: Piperaceae
- Genus: Peperomia
- Species: P. trujilloi

Binomial name
- Peperomia trujilloi Steyerm.

= Peperomia trujilloi =

Species of flowering plant

Peperomia trujilloi is a species of epiphyte in the genus Peperomia found in Colombia & Venezuela. It primarily grows on wet tropical biomes. Its conservation status is Threatened.

== Taxonomy and Naming ==
The first specimens where collected in Venezuela. It was described in 1984 by Steyerm. in Flora de Venezuela. It got its name from location where its specimens were first collected, which was Trujillo.

== Distribution and Habitat ==
It is found in Colombia and Venezuela. It grows on an epiphyte environment. In Colombia, its elevation range is 2200 – 2400 meters. It grows on wet tropical biomes.

== Conservation ==
This species is assessed as Threatened but with Low Confidence, in a preliminary report.
