= H. glabra =

H. glabra may refer to:

- Herniaria glabra, the smooth rupturewort, a plant species found in North America and Europe
- Heliamphora heterodoxa, a marsh pitcher plant species native to Gran Sabana and the plateau of the Ptari-Tepui in Venezuela
