= Wei-Assipu-tepui =

Minor tepui in South America

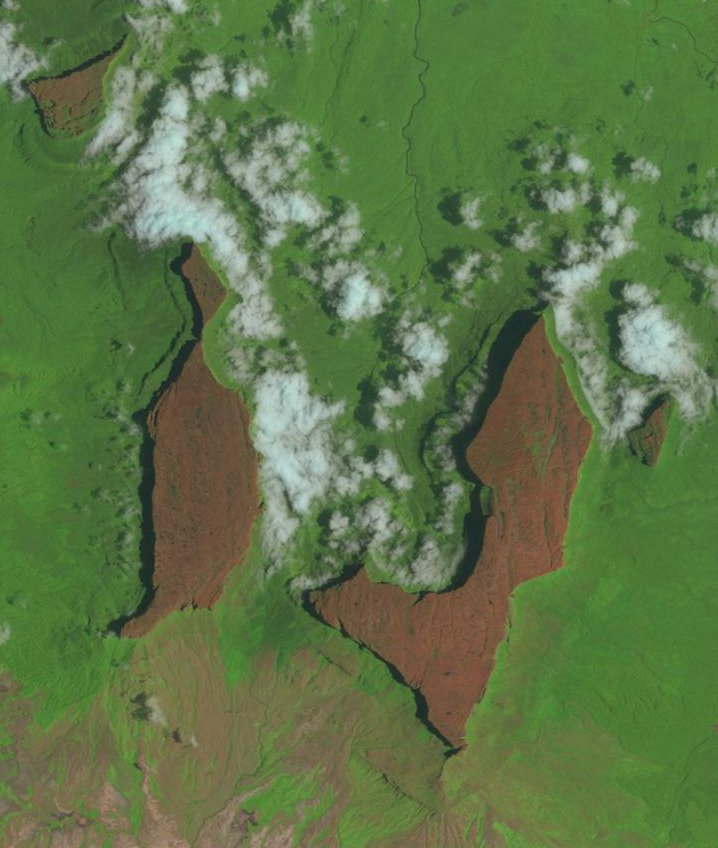
- Landsat image of the southern part of the Eastern Tepuis chain. The two large central plateaus are Kukenán-tepui (left) and Roraima-tepui. Wei-Assipu-tepui is the small peak to the northeast of Roraima. Also visible in the top left of the frame is Yuruaní-tepui.

Highest point
- Elevation: 2,400 m (7,900 ft)
- Coordinates: 05°13′08″N 60°42′18″W

Geography
- Location within Guyana
- Location: Roraima, Brazil / Cuyuni-Mazaruni, Guyana

Wei-Assipu-tepui, also known as Little Roraima or Roraimita, is a minor tepui of the Eastern Tepuis chain. It lies just off the northeastern flank of Roraima-tepui in the country of Brazil, directly on the border with neighboring Guyana in the disputed Essequibo territory, and very close to the tripoint of all three countries. The mountain is known for its extensive cave systems, with one extending for over a kilometre.

Wei-Assipu-tepui has a maximum elevation of around 2,400 metres (7,870 ft). Its summit plateau is highly dissected and generally inclined south-southwest (towards the Brazilian side). The rocky summit is partially forested, with flowering plants of the genus Bonnetia featuring prominently. It also hosts a number of carnivorous plants, including Heliamphora glabra, Heliamphora nutans, and the natural hybrid between the two. The various rock cavities of Wei-Assipu-tepui are home to nesting colonies of white-collared swifts (Streptoprocne zonaris) and oilbirds (Steatornis caripensis). For the latter species, Wei-Assipu-tepui is the easternmost recorded locality in mainland South America, and the first known nesting site in Brazil. The mountain's summit supports a greater variety of herpetofauna than the less vegetated plateaus of nearby Roraima-tepui, Kukenán-tepui, Yuruaní-tepui, and Ilú-tepui. Day temperatures of 17 °C (63 °F) have been recorded on the summit plateau, falling to 12 °C (54 °F) overnight, with slightly lower values in the more sheltered caves.

In the first expedition of its type to Wei-Assipu-tepui, an Italian–Venezuelan team of speleologists explored the mountain's summit plateau in July 2000, surveying four caves and several minor cavities. On this expedition were also discovered four previously unknown species of frogs (one of which was later described as Oreophrynella weiassipuensis), and at least two of harvestmen.

According to Carreño et al. (2002), the oldest biblio-cartographic reference to the mountain is likely that of Marie Penelope Rose Clementi (wife of Cecil Clementi), circa 1920, who recounted how its location was determined with a prismatic compass during an English expedition of 1915.

Surveyed caves and cavities of Wei-Assipu-tepui
Name	Extent	Depth	Altitude
Sima de los Guácharos de Wei-Assipu-tepui	1,194 m (3,917 ft)	111 m (364 ft)	2,280 m (7,480 ft)
Sima Wei-Assipu-tepui Oeste	280 m (920 ft)	92 m (302 ft)	~2,100 m (6,900 ft)
Abrigo Superior de Wei-Assipu-tepui	136 m (446 ft)	20 m (66 ft)	2,355 m (7,726 ft)
Hotel de Wei-Assipu-tepui	54 m (177 ft)	4 m (13 ft)	2,330 m (7,640 ft)
"Gruta de la Colecta" de Wei-Assipu-tepui	20 m (66 ft)	3 m (9.8 ft)	

== See also ==
- Distribution of Heliamphora
