= Heliamphora sp. 'Akopán Tepui' =

Scientific classification
- Kingdom: Plantae
- Clade: Tracheophytes
- Clade: Angiosperms
- Clade: Eudicots
- Clade: Asterids
- Order: Ericales
- Family: Sarraceniaceae
- Genus: Heliamphora
- Species: H. sp. 'Akopán Tepui'

Binomial name
- Heliamphora sp. 'Akopán Tepui'

Species of carnivorous plant

Heliamphora sp. 'Akopán Tepui' is an undescribed taxon of marsh pitcher plant known only from Akopán Tepui in Venezuela, where it grows at elevations of 1800–1900 m. It resembles H. heterodoxa in many respects, but has larger and broader pitchers, narrower tepals, and a smaller nectar spoon.
