= Uaipán-tepui =

- Location within Venezuela

Highest point
- Elevation: 1,950 m (6,400 ft)
- Coordinates: 05°39′18″N 62°37′12″W

Geography
- Location: Bolívar, Venezuela

Uaipán-tepui, also spelled Waipán, is a tepui in Bolívar state, Venezuela. It is a southern satellite peak of the vast Auyán Massif, with a maximum elevation of around 1,950 metres (6,400 ft). Its mostly forested summit plateau has an area of 2.5 km^{2} (0.97 sq mi). The mountain's slope area has been estimated at 60 km^{2} (23 sq mi).

== See also ==
- Distribution of Heliamphora
