= Heliamphora sp. 'Angasima Tepui' =

Scientific classification
- Kingdom: Plantae
- Clade: Tracheophytes
- Clade: Angiosperms
- Clade: Eudicots
- Clade: Asterids
- Order: Ericales
- Family: Sarraceniaceae
- Genus: Heliamphora
- Species: H. sp. 'Angasima Tepui'

Binomial name
- Heliamphora sp. 'Angasima Tepui'

Species of carnivorous plant

Heliamphora sp. 'Angasima Tepui' is an undescribed taxon of marsh pitcher plant known only from the summit of Angasima Tepui in Venezuela, where it grows at elevations of 2200–2250 m. It resembles H. heterodoxa in many respects, but has a smaller nectar spoon, numerous nectar glands on the outer pitcher surface, and forms large clumps up to 1.5 m across.
