= Upuigma-tepui =

Mountain in Bolívar, Venezuela

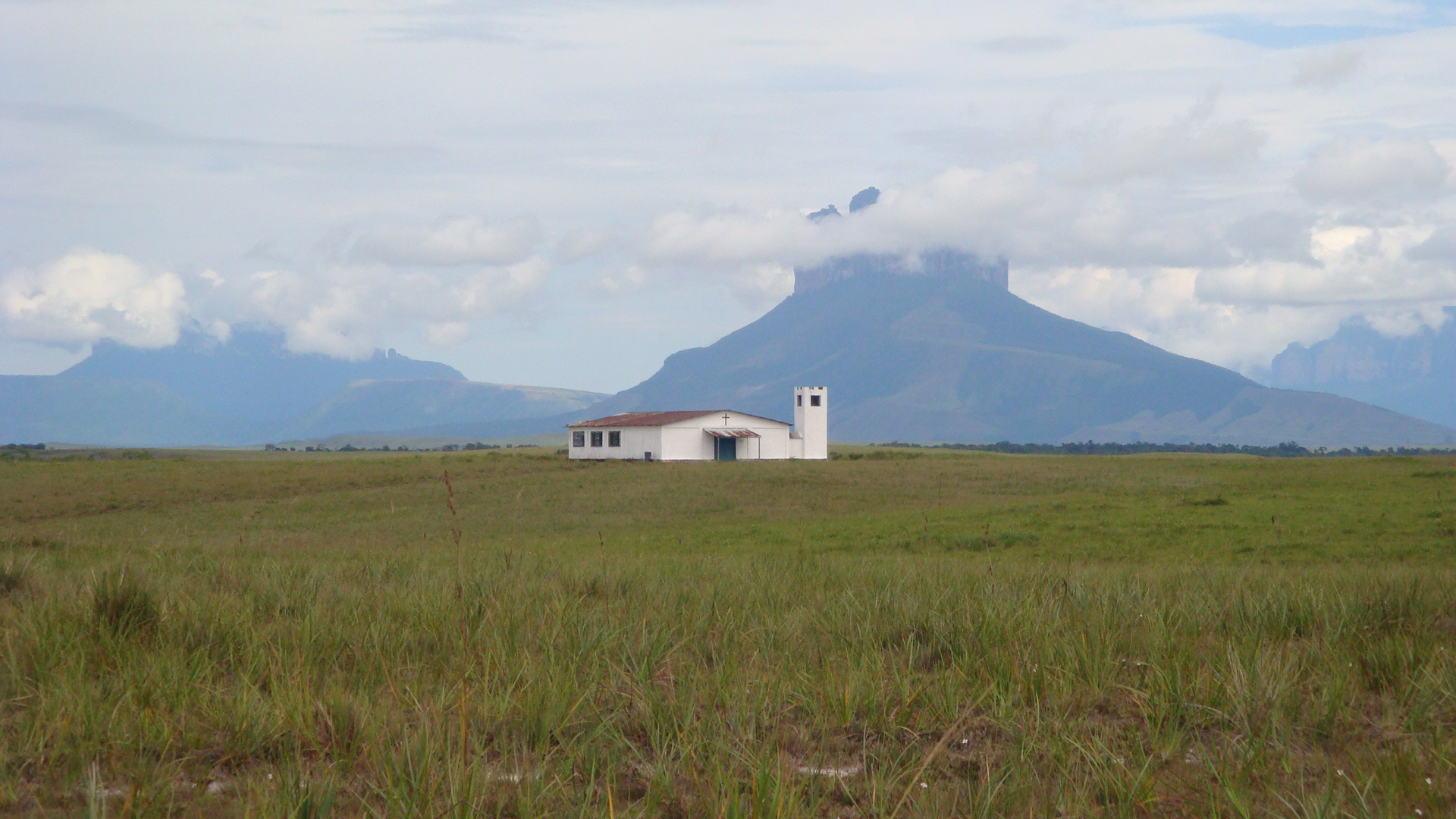
- View in August

Highest point
- Elevation: 2,100 m (6,900 ft)
- Coordinates: 05°05′10″N 61°57′23″W

Geography
- Location within Venezuela
- Location: Bolívar, Venezuela

Upuigma-tepui, also known as El Castillo, is a tepui in Bolívar state, Venezuela. A relatively isolated peak, both it and nearby Angasima-tepui lie just south of the vast Chimantá Massif, from which they are separated by the Río Aparurén valley. Upuigma-tepui is situated entirely within the bounds of Canaima National Park.

The imposing peak of Upuigma-tepui has an elevation of around 2,100 metres (6,900 ft). Its highly uneven summit is dotted with numerous rock towers and deep crevasses which make it practically impossible to traverse. Summit vegetation is predominantly in the form of tepui scrub and dense stands of herbaceous plants. The mountain has a summit area of 0.63 km^{2} (0.24 sq mi) and an estimated slope area of 13 km^{2} (5.0 sq mi).

The first documented people to climb Upuigma-tepui were John Arran, Ivan Calderon and Steve Backshall, in 2007. Upon reaching the summit, they discovered several previously unknown species of plants and animals. In a separate expedition, pictographic rock art belonging to an obscure culture was found. They are estimated to be 4 to 7 thousand years old.

== See also ==
- Distribution of Heliamphora
