= Araopán-tepui =

- Location within Venezuela

Highest point
- Elevation: 2,450 m (8,040 ft)
- Coordinates: 05°26′22″N 62°23′35″W

Geography
- Location: Bolívar, Venezuela

Araopán-tepui is a tepui in Bolívar state, Venezuela. It has an elevation of around 2,450 metres (8,040 ft) above sea level. Together with the larger Aprada-tepui to the west, it forms part of the Aprada Massif. A steep, semi-circular ridge connects these two summits.

Araopán-tepui has a summit area of 1.25 km^{2} (0.48 sq mi) and, together with Aprada-tepui, an estimated slope area of 210 km^{2} (81 sq mi).

== See also ==
- Distribution of Heliamphora
