= Anomaloglossus murisipanensis =

Conservation status
- Vulnerable (IUCN 3.1)

Scientific classification
- Kingdom: Animalia
- Phylum: Chordata
- Class: Amphibia
- Order: Anura
- Family: Aromobatidae
- Genus: Anomaloglossus
- Species: A. murisipanensis

Binomial name
- Anomaloglossus murisipanensis (La Marca, 1997)

Synonyms
- Colostethus murisipanensis La Marca, 1997

Species of frog

Anomaloglossus murisipanensis is a species of frog in the family Aromobatidae. It is endemic to Venezuela where it is known from its type locality, the Murisipán-tepui in the Bolívar state.

== Habitat ==
Scientists know this frog from a single specimen collected at the type locality, Murisipan-Tepui, approximately 2350 meters above sea level.

Scientists note that this typo locality is consistent with two protected areas, Canaima National Park and Los Tepuyes Natural Monument.

== Threats ==
Both the IUCN and the Venezuelan Fauna Red List classify this frog as vulnerable to extinction. This species lives in pristine habitat high on the flatland, but human-set fires can extend that high. Climate change also poses some threat to this frog because it would be physically unable to migrate if the weather were to change. Emerging diseases from viruses, bacteria, and fungi could also hurt this frog.
