= Cerro El Sol =

Mountain in Venezuela

- Location within Venezuela

Highest point
- Elevation: 1,750 m (5,740 ft)
- Coordinates: 06°06′46″N 62°33′01″W

Geography
- Location: Bolívar, Venezuela

Cerro El Sol, also known as Wei- or Uei-tepui, is a small tepui in Bolívar state, Venezuela. It is situated off the northern flank of Auyán-tepui, just northwest of the similarly small Cerro La Luna, and forms part of the Auyán Massif. Both it and Cerro La Luna emerge near the end of a long forested ridge leading from Auyán-tepui. Cerro El Sol has an elevation of around 1,750 metres (5,740 ft) and a summit area of 0.6 km^{2} (0.23 sq mi).

== See also ==
- Distribution of Heliamphora
