= Aprada-tepui =

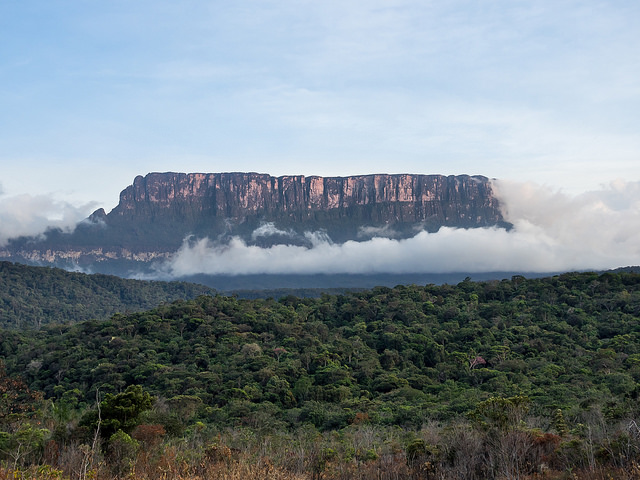

Highest point
- Elevation: 2,500 m (8,200 ft)
- Coordinates: 05°24′38″N 62°26′54″W

Geography
- Location within Venezuela
- Location: Bolívar, Venezuela

Aprada-tepui is a tepui in Bolívar state, Venezuela. It has an elevation of around 2,500 metres (8,200 ft) above sea level. It gives its name to the Aprada Massif, which also includes the smaller Araopán-tepui to the east. A steep, semi-circular ridge connects these two summits. Aprada-tepui lies 22 kilometres (14 mi) northwest of the much larger Chimantá Massif and around 25 km (16 mi) east of the Pemón village of Urimán.

Aprada-tepui has a summit area of 4.37 km^{2} (1.69 sq mi) and, together with Araopán-tepui, an estimated slope area of 210 km^{2} (81 sq mi). Both peaks are situated entirely within the bounds of Canaima National Park.

== Flora and fauna ==
Frogs Pristimantis jamescameroni and Anomaloglossus breweri are endemic to Aprada-tepui—they are found nowhere else.

== See also ==
- Distribution of Heliamphora
