= Stanmarkia =

Scientific classification
- Kingdom: Plantae
- Clade: Tracheophytes
- Clade: Angiosperms
- Clade: Eudicots
- Clade: Rosids
- Order: Myrtales
- Family: Melastomataceae
- Genus: Stanmarkia; Almeda

Genus of flowering plant

Stanmarkia is a genus of flowering plants belonging to the family Melastomataceae.

It is native to south-eastern Mexico and Guatemala.

The genus name of Stanmarkia is in honour of 2 American botanists; Paul Carpenter Standley (1884–1963) and Julian Alfred Steyermark (1909–1988). It was first described and published in Brittonia Vol.45 on page 198 in 1993.

== Known species ==
According to Kew:

- Stanmarkia medialis (Standl. & Steyerm.) Almeda
- Stanmarkia spectabilis Almeda
