= Cerro La Luna =

Mountain in Venezuela

- Location within Venezuela

Highest point
- Elevation: 1,650 m (5,410 ft)
- Coordinates: 06°06′06″N 62°32′04″W

Geography
- Location: Bolívar, Venezuela

Cerro La Luna is a small tepui in Bolívar state, Venezuela. It is situated off the northern flank of Auyán-tepui, just southeast of the similarly small Cerro El Sol, and forms part of the Auyán Massif. Both it and Cerro El Sol emerge near the end of a long forested ridge leading from Auyán-tepui. Cerro La Luna has an elevation of around 1,650 metres (5,410 ft) and a summit area of 0.2 km^{2} (0.077 sq mi).

== See also ==
- Distribution of Heliamphora
