= Chimantá Massif =

Fragmented complex of tepuis in Venezuela

- Location within Venezuela

Highest point
- Elevation: 2,698 m (8,852 ft)
- Coordinates: 05°15′48″N 62°08′52″W

Geography
- Location: Bolívar, Venezuela

The Chimantá Massif is a highly fragmented complex of tepuis in Bolívar state, Venezuela. The massif comprises around 11 tepuis and has a total summit area of 615 km^{2} (237 sq mi) and an estimated slope area of 915 km^{2} (353 sq mi). It is divided in two by the Río Tírica, with the northern section being both larger and higher. The massif is notable for its high species richness and for its varied habitat types. It reaches an elevation of 2,698 metres (8,852 ft) on its highest peak, Murey-tepui (also known as Eruoda-tepui). The massif is situated entirely within the bounds of Canaima National Park. It hosts extensive cave systems, including the world's largest known quartzite cave, Cueva Charles Brewer, named after discoverer Charles Brewer-Carías. The processes behind their speleogenesis are the subject of some debate.

The isolated southern peaks of Angasima-tepui and Upuigma-tepui are sometimes considered part of the Chimantá Massif.

== Tepuis ==
The major tepuis of the northern and southern parts of the Chimantá Massif are listed below. Coordinates given correspond to the approximate centre points of the tepui summit plateaus. Unless otherwise indicated, all information in the tables is sourced from Flora of the Venezuelan Guayana.

=== Northern group ===
Name	Coordinates	Maximum elevation	Summit area
Abacapá-tepui	05°11′04″N 62°17′51″W	2,400 m (7,900 ft)	28.13 km^{2} (10.86 sq mi)
Agparamán-tepui	05°14′50″N 62°12′29″W	2,400 m (7,900 ft)	22.5 km^{2} (8.7 sq mi)
Apacará-tepui	05°19′12″N 62°13′43″W	2,450 m (8,040 ft)	173.12 km^{2} (66.84 sq mi)
Chimantá-tepui	05°16′37″N 62°07′52″W	2,550 m (8,370 ft)	93.75 km^{2} (36.20 sq mi)
Murey-tepui	05°22′36″N 62°05′36″W	2,698 m (8,852 ft)	51.25 km^{2} (19.79 sq mi)
Tirepón-tepui	05°22′04″N 62°01′12″W	±2,600 m (8,500 ft)	8.75 km^{2} (3.38 sq mi)
Toronó-tepui	05°12′42″N 62°10′33″W	2,500 m (8,200 ft)	59.38 km^{2} (22.93 sq mi)

An additional plateau, Sarvén-tepui, may be distinguished to the east of Chimantá-tepui (05°17′55″N 62°04′17″W).

=== Southern group ===
Name	Coordinates	Maximum elevation	Summit area
Acopán-tepui	05°10′55″N 62°02′42″W	2,200 m (7,200 ft)	92.5 km^{2} (35.7 sq mi)
Amurí-tepui	05°08′57″N 62°07′16″W	2,200 m (7,200 ft)	36.88 km^{2} (14.24 sq mi)
Churí-tepui	05°15′12″N 62°00′41″W	2,500 m (8,200 ft)	47.5 km^{2} (18.3 sq mi)

== See also ==
- Chimantaea
- Distribution of Heliamphora
- Heliamphora sp. 'Akopán Tepui'
