= Cerro Aracamuni =

Mountain in Venezuela

- Location within Venezuela

Highest point
- Elevation: 1,600 m (5,200 ft)
- Coordinates: 01°34′03″N 65°52′52″W

Geography
- Location: Amazonas, Venezuela

Cerro Aracamuni is a granitic tepui in Amazonas state, Venezuela. Part of the Neblina–Aracamuni Massif, it lies north of Cerro Avispa and the vast complex of Cerro de la Neblina. Cerro Aracamuni and Cerro Avispa share a common slope area; they have a combined summit area of 238 km^{2} (92 sq mi) and an estimated combined slope area of 658 km^{2} (254 sq mi). Both of these cerro-plateaus have a maximum elevation of around 1,600 metres (5,200 ft).

Cerro Aracamuni lies within the Serranía de la Neblina National Park. There is illegal mining activity at its base.

Cerro Aracamuni emerald-barred frog, Ceuthomantis aracamuni, is only known from Cerro Aracamuni.

== See also ==
- Distribution of Heliamphora
