= Heliamphora glabra =

Scientific classification
- Kingdom: Plantae
- Clade: Tracheophytes
- Clade: Angiosperms
- Clade: Eudicots
- Clade: Asterids
- Order: Ericales
- Family: Sarraceniaceae
- Genus: Heliamphora
- Species: H. glabra

Binomial name
- Heliamphora glabra (Maguire) Nerz, Wistuba & Hoogenstrijd (2006)

Synonyms
- Heliamphora heterodoxa var. glabra Maguire (1978); Heliamphora heterodoxa f. glabra (Maguire) Steyerm. (1984)

Species of plant

Heliamphora glabra (Latin: glaber = bald) is a species of marsh pitcher plant native to Serra do Sol in Venezuela. It was for a long time considered a form of H. heterodoxa, but has recently been raised to species rank.
