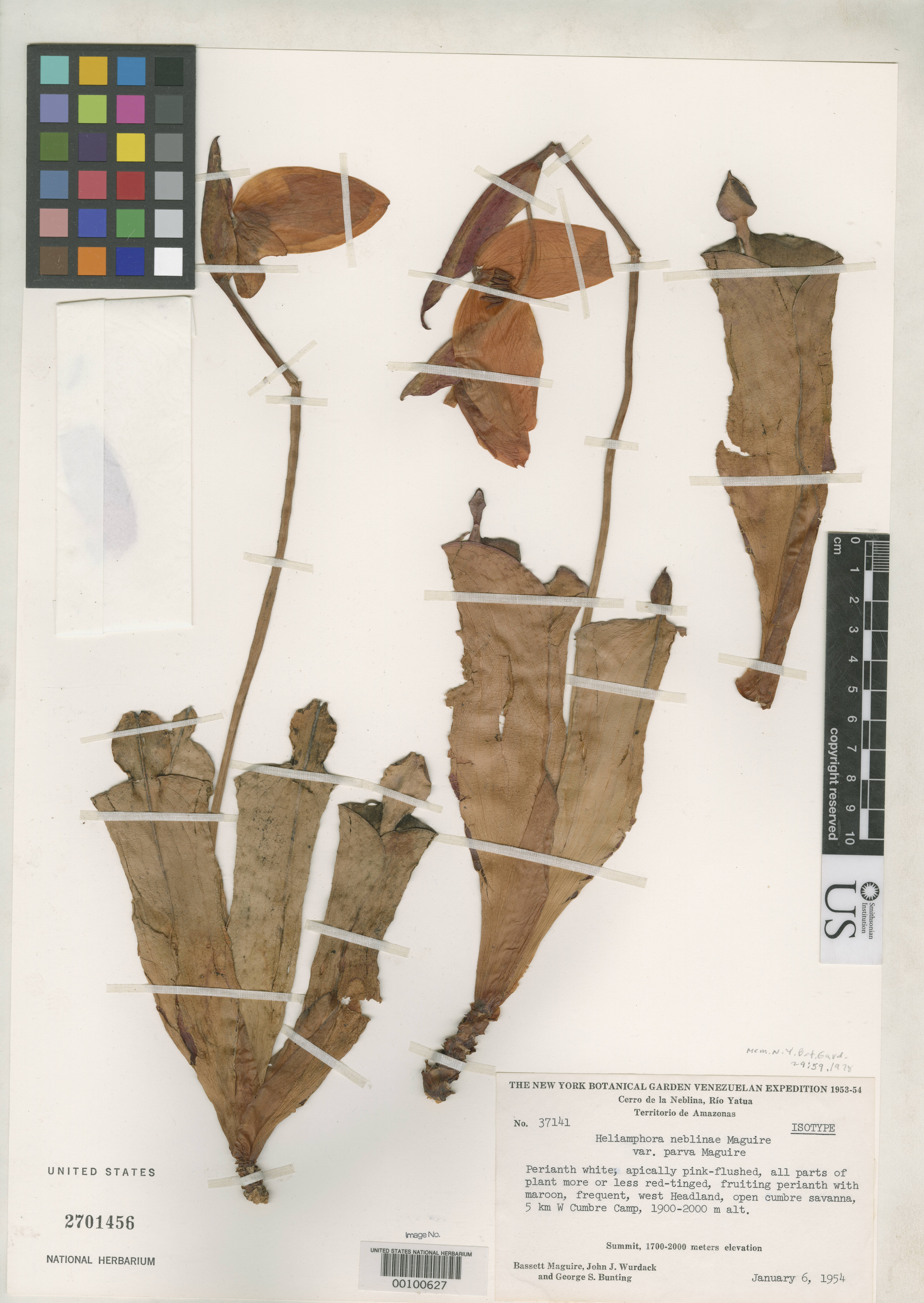
- Isotype held at the NMNH

Scientific classification
- Kingdom: Plantae
- Clade: Tracheophytes
- Clade: Angiosperms
- Clade: Eudicots
- Clade: Asterids
- Order: Ericales
- Family: Sarraceniaceae
- Genus: Heliamphora
- Species: H. parva

Binomial name
- Heliamphora parva (Maguire) S.McPherson, A.Fleischm., Wistuba & Nerz (2011)

Synonyms
- Heliamphora neblinae var. parva Maguire (1978); Heliamphora neblinae var. viridis Maguire (1978); Heliamphora tatei var. neblinae f. parva (Maguire) Steyerm. (1984)

= Heliamphora parva =

Species of carnivorous plant

Heliamphora parva is a species of marsh pitcher plant known only from the Neblina Massif in Venezuela, where it grows at elevations of 1750–2200 m.
