= Angasima-tepui =

Tepui in Bolívar, Venezuela

- Location within Venezuela

Highest point
- Elevation: 2,250 m (7,380 ft)
- Coordinates: 05°02′51″N 62°06′44″W

Geography
- Location: Bolívar, Venezuela

Angasima-tepui, also known as Adanta, Adankasima or Adankachimö, is a tepui in Bolívar state, Venezuela. A relatively isolated peak, both it and nearby Upuigma-tepui lie just south of the vast Chimantá Massif, from which they are separated by the Río Aparurén valley. Amurí-tepui, the closest member of the Chimantá Massif, is only 8 kilometres (5.0 mi) from Angasima-tepui.

The imposing triangular peak of Angasima-tepui has an elevation of around 2,250 metres (7,400 ft). Its summit plateau is heavily windswept, the northern part being dominated by low herbaceous vegetation. A southern peak bears dense tepui scrub. The mountain has a summit area of 2 km^{2} (0.77 sq mi) and an estimated slope area of 32 km^{2} (12 sq mi). It is situated entirely within the bounds of Canaima National Park.

The undescribed pitcher plant Heliamphora sp. 'Angasima Tepui' is endemic to the summit region of Angasima-tepui.

== See also ==
- Distribution of Heliamphora
