= Cerro de la Neblina =

Sandstone massif in the northern Amazon Basin

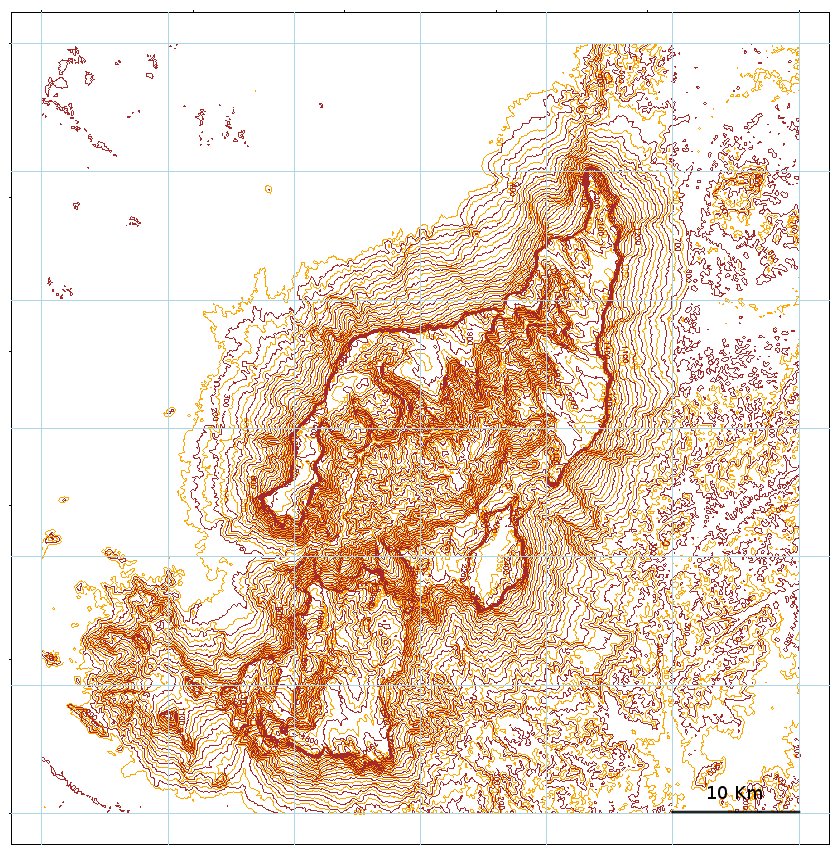
- Topographic map of the massif

Highest point
- Elevation: 2,994 m (9,823 ft)
- Coordinates: 00°53′11″N 65°59′22″W

Geography
- Location within Venezuela
- Location: Amazonas, Brazil / Amazonas, Venezuela

Cerro de la Neblina (lit. "Mountain of the Mist"), also known as Serra da Neblina in Brazil and Sierra de la Neblina in Venezuela, is a sandstone massif located in the northern Amazon Basin. It is a tilted, heavily eroded plateau, with a deep canyon in its central portion (Cañón Grande), drained by the Baria River.

Most of the massif is in Venezuelan territory, but its southeastern ridge forms part of the Brazil–Venezuela border, and this ridge is where the highest point in the massif, Pico da Neblina, is located. At 2,994 metres (9,823 ft) above sea level, Pico da Neblina is also the highest point in Brazil, the highest point in the Guiana Shield, and the highest South American mountain east of the Andes. Pico da Neblina is inside Brazilian territory, but only a few hundred metres from the Venezuelan border.

The slightly lower Pico 31 de Março or Pico Phelps, 2,974 metres (9,757 ft) a.s.l., lies next to Pico da Neblina, on the precise international border. Pico 31 de Março/Phelps is Brazil's second-highest mountain and the highest in Venezuela outside of the Andes. The massif's other named peaks include Pico Cardona, Pico Maguire, and Pico Zuloaga.

To the north of Cerro de la Neblina lie the smaller outcrops of Cerro Aracamuni and Cerro Avispa, both reaching approximately 1,600 metres (5,200 ft) in elevation.

The massif was first explored in 1954 by an American expedition led by Bassett Maguire of the New York Botanical Garden that performed an aerial inspection and then climbed the massif's northwestern slopes. In January 1999, a group of carnivorous plant enthusiasts climbed Pico da Neblina following a 30 km hike up the previously unexplored northeastern ridge. In 1972, Maguireocharis neblinae Steyerm. in the family Rubiaceae, was published and named after the massif and the explorer, Bassett Maguire.

Cerro de la Neblina is sometimes referred to as the Neblina Massif, though this term may also encompass Cerro Aracamuni and Cerro Avispa (a grouping of mountains more precisely known as the Neblina–Aracamuni Massif). The Neblina–Aracamuni Massif has a total summit area of roughly 473 km^{2} (183 sq mi) and an estimated slope area of 1,515 km^{2} (585 sq mi), of which Cerro de la Neblina accounts for 235 km^{2} (91 sq mi) and 857 km^{2} (331 sq mi), respectively.

Maguire's passage to Venezuela was provided by Gulf Oil executive Willard F. Jones.

== See also ==
- Distribution of Heliamphora
- Neblina uakari
- Pico da Neblina National Park
- Koyamaea neblinensis
