= Auyán-tepui =

Tepui in Venezuela

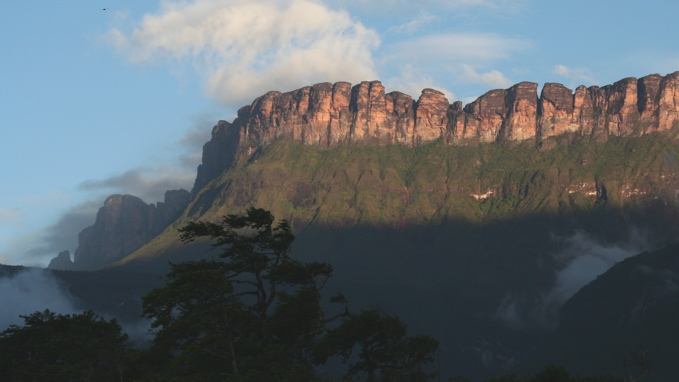
- Auyán-tepui seen at dusk from Campo Uruyen

Highest point
- Elevation: 2,450 m (8,040 ft)
- Coordinates: 5°54′01″N 62°32′30″W

Geography
- Location within Venezuela
- Location: Bolívar, Venezuela

Auyán-tepui (Spanish pronunciation: [awˈʝan teˈpuj]), also spelled Ayan, is a tepui in Bolívar state, Venezuela. It is the most visited and one of the largest (but not the highest) tepuis in the Guiana Highlands, with a summit area of 666.9 km^{2} (257.5 sq mi) and an estimated slope area of 715 km^{2} (276 sq mi).

The unevenly heart-shaped summit plateau of Auyán-tepui is heavily inclined, rising from around 1,600 metres (5,200 ft) in the northwest to a maximum of 2,450 m (8,040 ft) in the southeast. It is incised from the north by a vast valley, the Cañón del Diablo (Devil's Canyon), formed by the Churún River. The larger western portion of the plateau is partially forested, whereas the eastern part comprises mostly bare rock with only patchy vegetation cover. The mountain hosts a number of extensive cave systems.

Auyán-tepui gives its name to the Auyán Massif, which also includes the tiny peaks of Cerro El Sol and Cerro La Luna to the north and the satellite mountain of Uaipán-tepui to the south. The massif has a total summit area of roughly 670 km^{2} (260 sq mi) and an estimated slope area of 795 km^{2} (307 sq mi). It is situated entirely within the bounds of Canaima National Park. Auyán-tepui means "House of the Gods" in the local Pemón language.

Angel Falls, the tallest waterfall in the world, drops from a cleft near the summit. The falls are 979 meters (3,212 ft) high, with an uninterrupted descent of 807 meters (2,648 ft) — a drop nineteen times higher than that of Niagara Falls.

Auyán-tepui achieved international fame in 1933 when Angel Falls was accidentally discovered by Jimmie Angel, a bush pilot searching for gold ore. Attempting to land on the heart-shaped mesa in 1937, Angel crashed his small Flamingo plane on top of Auyán-tepui and was forced to hike down the gradually sloping backside, a trip that took him and his crew 11 days to complete; he was immortalised when the waterfall was named after him.

Around 25 species of amphibians and reptiles are known from the summit plateau of Auyán-tepui, as well as numerous birds. Like many tepuis, the mountain hosts a rich assemblage of flora.

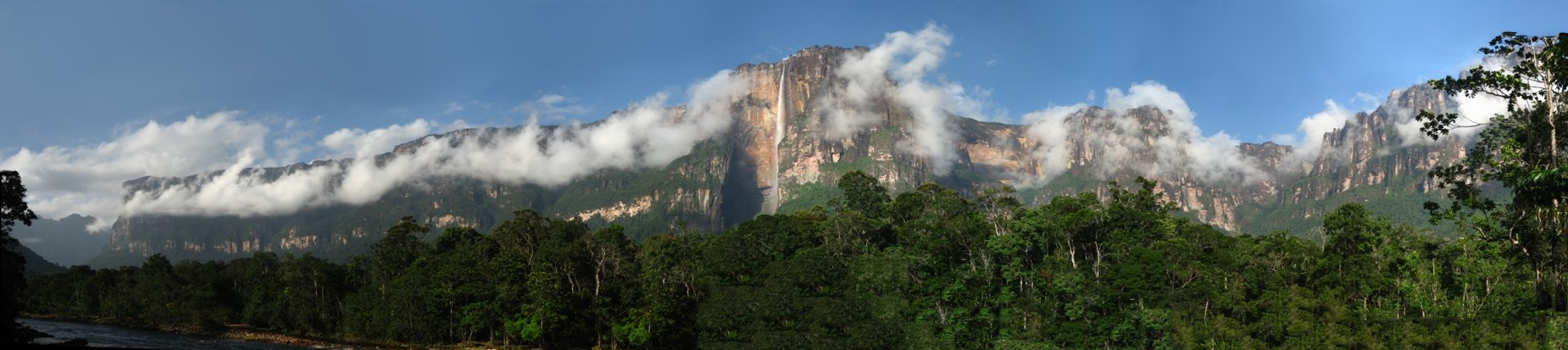
Partly clouded view of Auyán-tepui and Angel Falls (centre) from Isla Raton camp, taken during the end of the dry season

== See also ==
- Gran Sabana
- Distribution of Heliamphora
