= Aparamán-tepui =

- Location within Venezuela

Highest point
- Elevation: 2,100 m (6,900 ft)
- Coordinates: 05°53′13″N 62°07′52″W

Geography
- Location: Bolívar, Venezuela

Aparamán-tepui is the westernmost of the four main tepuis of the Los Testigos chain in Bolívar, Venezuela. While the other three tepuis share a common slope area, Aparamán is derived from a separate basement. Aparamán-tepui has an elevation of around 2,100 metres (6,900 ft), a summit area of 1.25 km^{2} (0.48 sq mi), and an estimated slope area of 28 km^{2} (11 sq mi). Its mostly bare summit plateau is highly dissected, presenting difficulties even for helicopter landings.

In his 1978 book, La Vegetación del Mundo Perdido, Charles Brewer-Carías referred to a smaller lateral peak of Aparamán-tepui (05°52′32″N 62°06′48″W) as Murochiopán-tepui, though this name is now more commonly applied to the major peak immediately east of it.

== See also ==
- Distribution of Heliamphora
