= Uei-tepui =

Mountain in Brazil and Venezuela

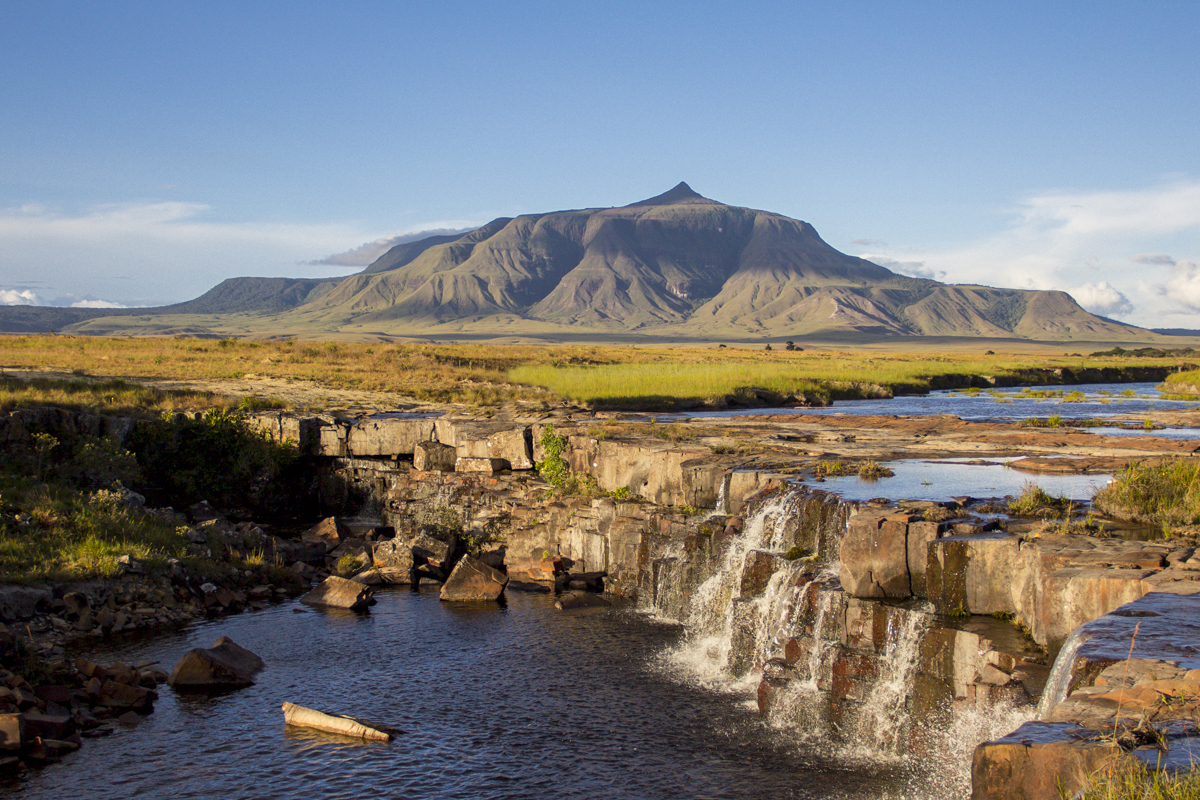
- Uei-tepui in 2013

Highest point
- Elevation: 2,150 m (7,050 ft)
- Coordinates: 05°01′01″N 60°36′55″W

Geography
- Location within Venezuela
- Location: Roraima, Brazil / Bolívar, Venezuela

Uei-tepui, also known as Wei-tepui, Cerro El Sol or Serra do Sol is a tepui on the border between Brazil and Venezuela. It may be considered the southernmost member of the Eastern Tepuis chain.

Uei-tepui reaches an elevation of approximately 2,150 metres (7,050 ft), with a summit area of 2.5 km^{2} (0.97 sq mi) and an estimated slope area of 20 km^{2} (7.7 sq mi). Although its peak lies entirely within Venezuelan territory, a large portion of the main ridge forms the border between Venezuela and Brazil.

== See also ==
- Distribution of Heliamphora
