= Flora of the Venezuelan Guayana =

- Volume 1, showing the cover design used across all volumes. The photograph by Karl Weidmann shows Acopán-tepui in the foreground with Angasima-tepui in the distance.
- Author: Julian A. Steyermark, Paul E. Berry, Kay Yatskievych & Bruce K. Holst (general editors)
- Language: English
- Publisher: Timber Press, Missouri Botanical Garden Press
- Publication date: 1995–2005
- Media type: Print (hardcover)
- Pages: 6543 (all volumes combined)
- OCLC: 31938617

Flora of the Venezuelan Guayana is a multivolume flora describing the vascular plants of the Guayana Region of Venezuela, encompassing the three states south of the Orinoco: Amazonas, Bolívar, and Delta Amacuro. Initiated by Julian Alfred Steyermark in the early 1980s, it was completed after his death under the guidance of Paul E. Berry, Kay Yatskievych, and Bruce K. Holst. The nine volumes were published between 1995 and 2005 by Timber Press and Missouri Botanical Garden Press. The project brought together more than 200 botanists from around the world and was "the first effort to produce a comprehensive inventory and identification guide for the plants of such an extensive region of northern South America".

== Volumes ==
The first volume, written primarily by Italian ecologist Otto Huber, is an introduction to the geography, ecology, botanical history and conservation of the Venezuelan Guayana, and includes two fold-out maps of the region (one vegetation and one topographical, both 1:2,000,000 scale). The subsequent eight volumes cover the known plant families of the area in alphabetical order, each treating around 1000–1300 species. Ferns and fern allies are covered in the first part of volume 2, with the remainder of that volume, and the rest of the flora, devoted to seed plants (generally following the Cronquist system for flowering plants). Both native and naturalised species are included. Around half of all species are illustrated with black-and-white line drawings by Venezuelan artist Bruno Manara. Species accounts include non-exhaustive synonymies, and vernacular names are occasionally given.

- Volume 1, Introduction (1995). ISBN 9780915279739. 363 pp.
- Volume 2, Pteridophytes, Spermatophytes, Acanthaceae–Araceae (1995). ISBN 9780915279746. 706 pp., 1285 species treated, 618 line drawings.
- Volume 3, Araliaceae–Cactaceae (1997). ISBN 9780915279463. 792 pp., 1113 species treated, 628 line drawings.
- Volume 4, Caesalpiniaceae–Ericaceae (1998). ISBN 9780915279524. 799 pp., 1329 species treated, 621 line drawings.
- Volume 5, Eriocaulaceae–Lentibulariaceae (1999). ISBN 9780915279715. 833 pp., 1304 species treated, 707 line drawings.
- Volume 6, Liliaceae–Myrsinaceae (2001). ISBN 9780915279814. 803 pp., 1217 species treated, 657 line drawings.
- Volume 7, Myrtaceae–Plumbaginaceae (2003). ISBN 9781930723139. 765 pp., 1338 species treated, 646 line drawings.
- Volume 8, Poaceae–Rubiaceae (2004). ISBN 9781930723368. 874 pp., 1248 species treated, 659 line drawings.
- Volume 9, Rutaceae–Zygophyllaceae (2005). ISBN 9781930723474. 608 pp., 971 species treated, 503 line drawings.

== Reviews ==
In his Guide to Standard Floras of the World, David G. Frodin cited Flora of the Venezuelan Guayana as an example of a "[g]ood modern, relatively 'concise' conventional flora".

The introductory volume has been singled out as both a useful addition to the flora and a valuable work in its own right. Writing in the Edinburgh Journal of Botany, S. Bridgewater considered the first volume "an excellent way of starting a Flora" and "a highly desirable book for anyone with a love of botany and South America". He added that the prose "is both unpretentious and accessible, whilst being thoroughly researched". These views were echoed in the Handbook of Latin American Studies, where the volume is described as "authoritative and superbly illustrated" and "[m]uch broader than [its] title suggests".

R. Atkinson, who reviewed volume 2 for the Edinburgh Journal of Botany, considered the book's dichotomous keys "concise and easy to use" and the illustrations "clear although sometimes rather diagrammatic". More serious criticism was levelled at the alphabetical arrangement of families, which Atkinson considered the work's "biggest drawback". He continued: "It would be more valuable if a systematic approach had been taken to avoid the absurdity of closely related families being placed (under an evolutionarily arbitrary, alphabetical system) in different volumes."

Reviewing volume 7 in Economic Botany, Neil A. Harriman wrote that the entire flora was "lavishly produced, with a great many line drawings to aid in identification". He added: "I think it indicates how carefully these volumes are done, that weedy little Plantago major gets just as much space, and just as fine an illustration, as any of the rare, exotic, endemic orchid species do." Harriman also noted the comprehensive literature citations, which he found "most helpful". Although rather conservative, Harriman considered the species synonymies adequate.
