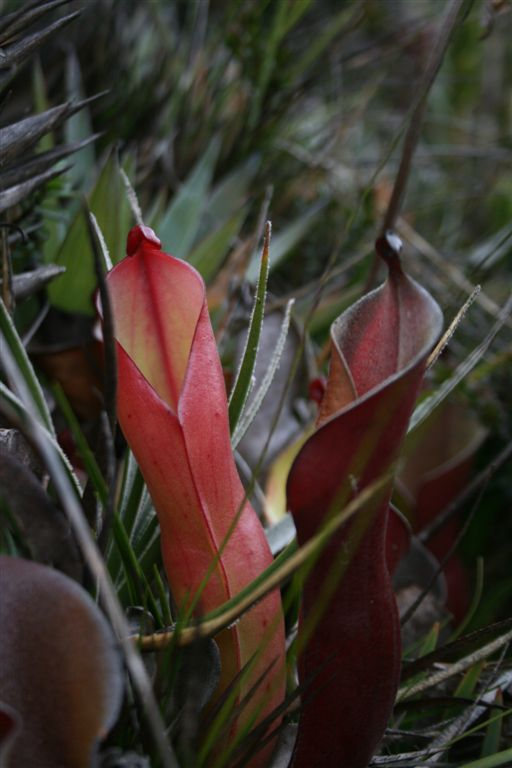
- Heliamphora nutans on Mount Roraima

Scientific classification
- Kingdom: Plantae
- Clade: Tracheophytes
- Clade: Angiosperms
- Clade: Eudicots
- Clade: Asterids
- Order: Ericales
- Family: Sarraceniaceae
- Genus: Heliamphora
- Species: H. nutans

Binomial name
- Heliamphora nutans Benth. (1840)

Synonyms
- Heliamphora heterodoxa auct. non Steyerm.: G.Cheers (1992); Sarracenia nutans (Benth.) D.Dietr. (1843)

= Heliamphora nutans =

Species of carnivorous plant

Heliamphora nutans (Latin: nutans = nodding) is a species of marsh pitcher plant native to the border area between Venezuela, Brazil and Guyana, where it grows on several tepuis, including Roraima, Kukenán, Yuruaní, Maringma, and Wei Assipu. Heliamphora nutans was the first Heliamphora to be described and is the best known species.

Heliamphora nutans was originally discovered in 1839 on Mount Roraima by the two brothers Robert and Richard Schomburgk, although they did not collect samples to return to Europe. The plant was formally described by George Bentham in 1840, becoming the type species of the genus. In 1881, David Burke was plant-hunting in the same area of British Guiana where he collected specimens of the plant and introduced it to England.

This species employs an 'aquaplaning' trapping mechanism (whereby prey animals slip into the pitchers on the downwards-pointing hairs, which are significantly more slippery when wet) similar to that of many tropical pitcher plants of the genus Nepenthes.

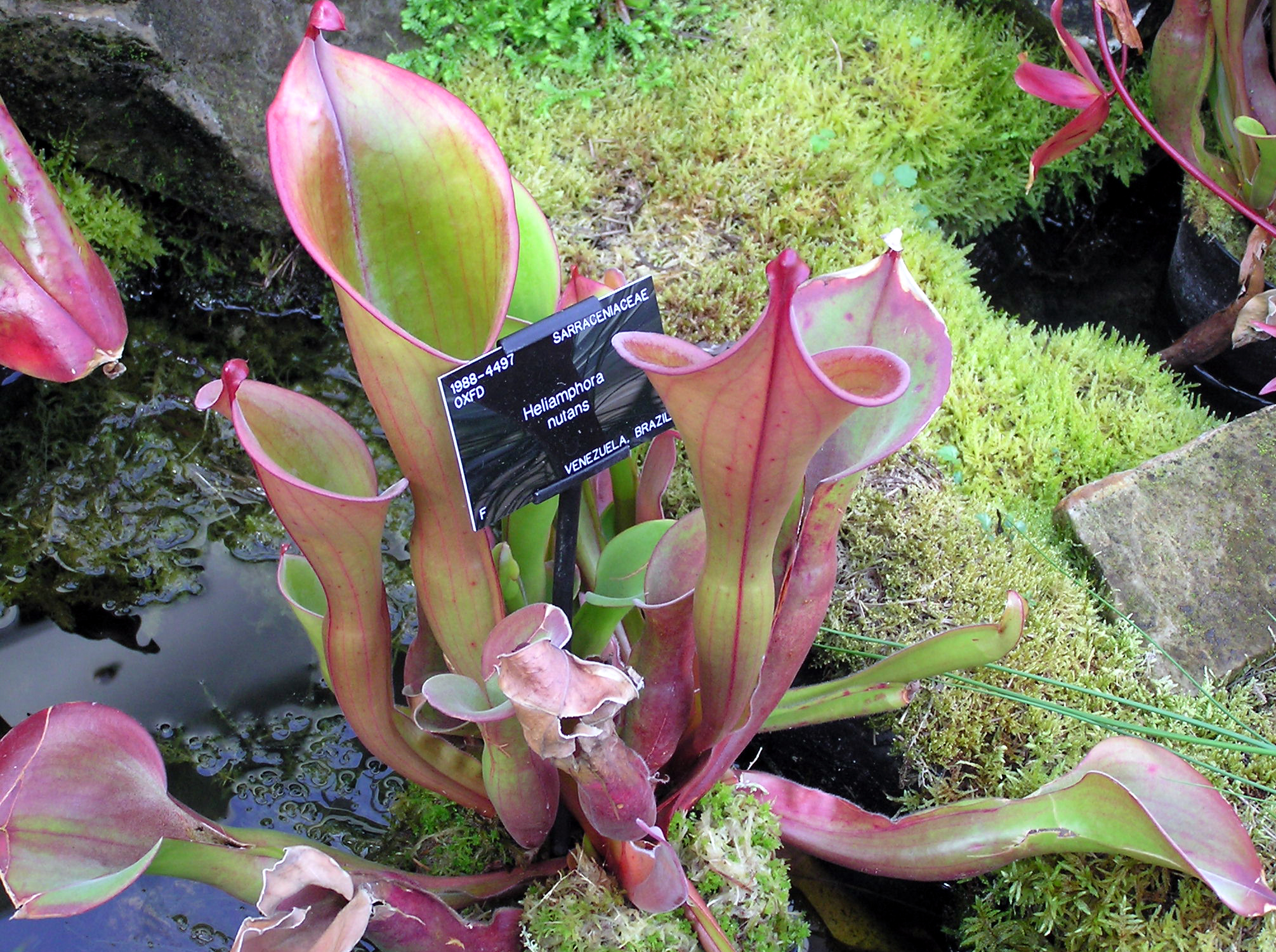
Heliamphora nutans at Kew Gardens, London

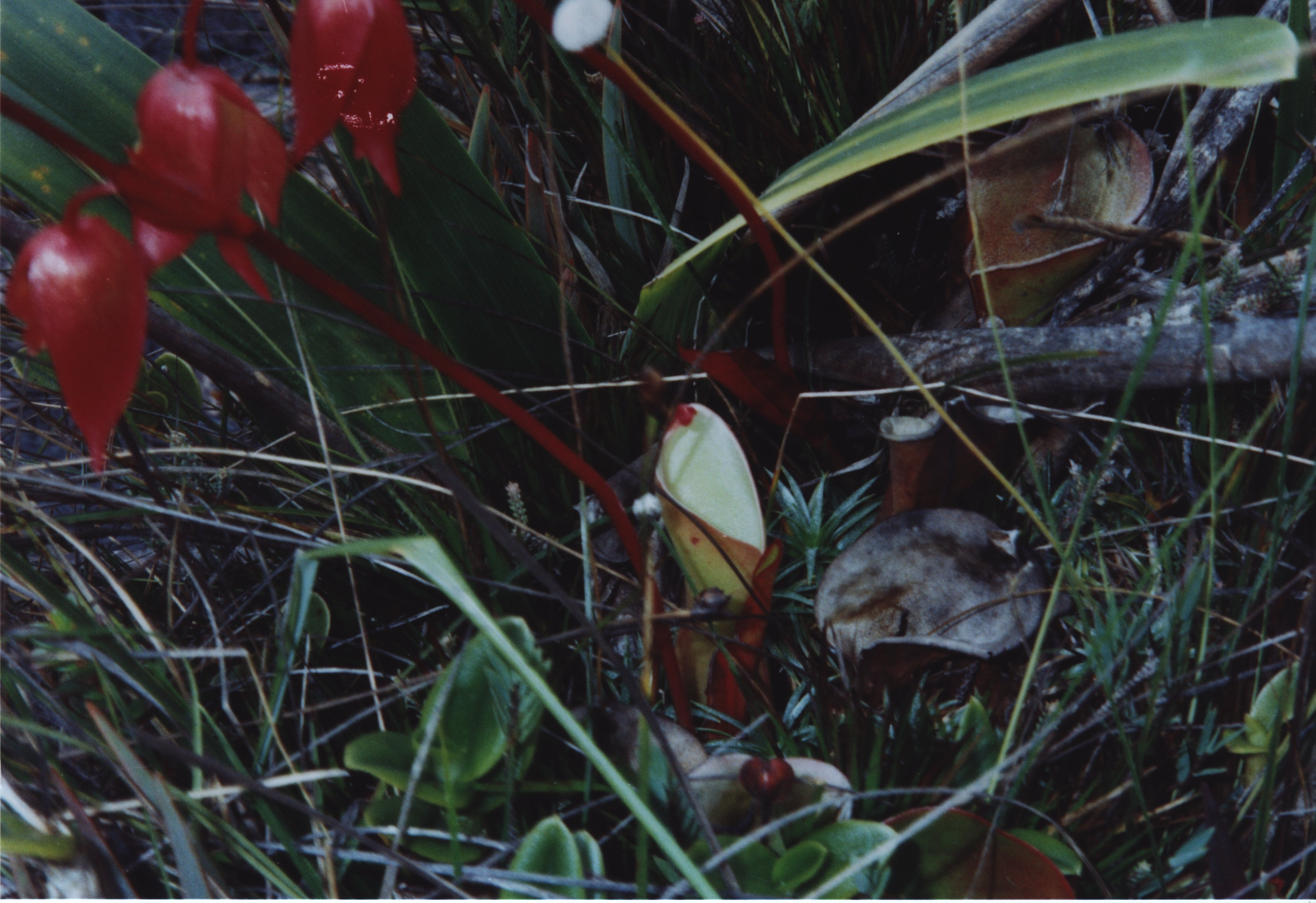
Heliamphora nutans growing on Mount Roraima in Venezuela

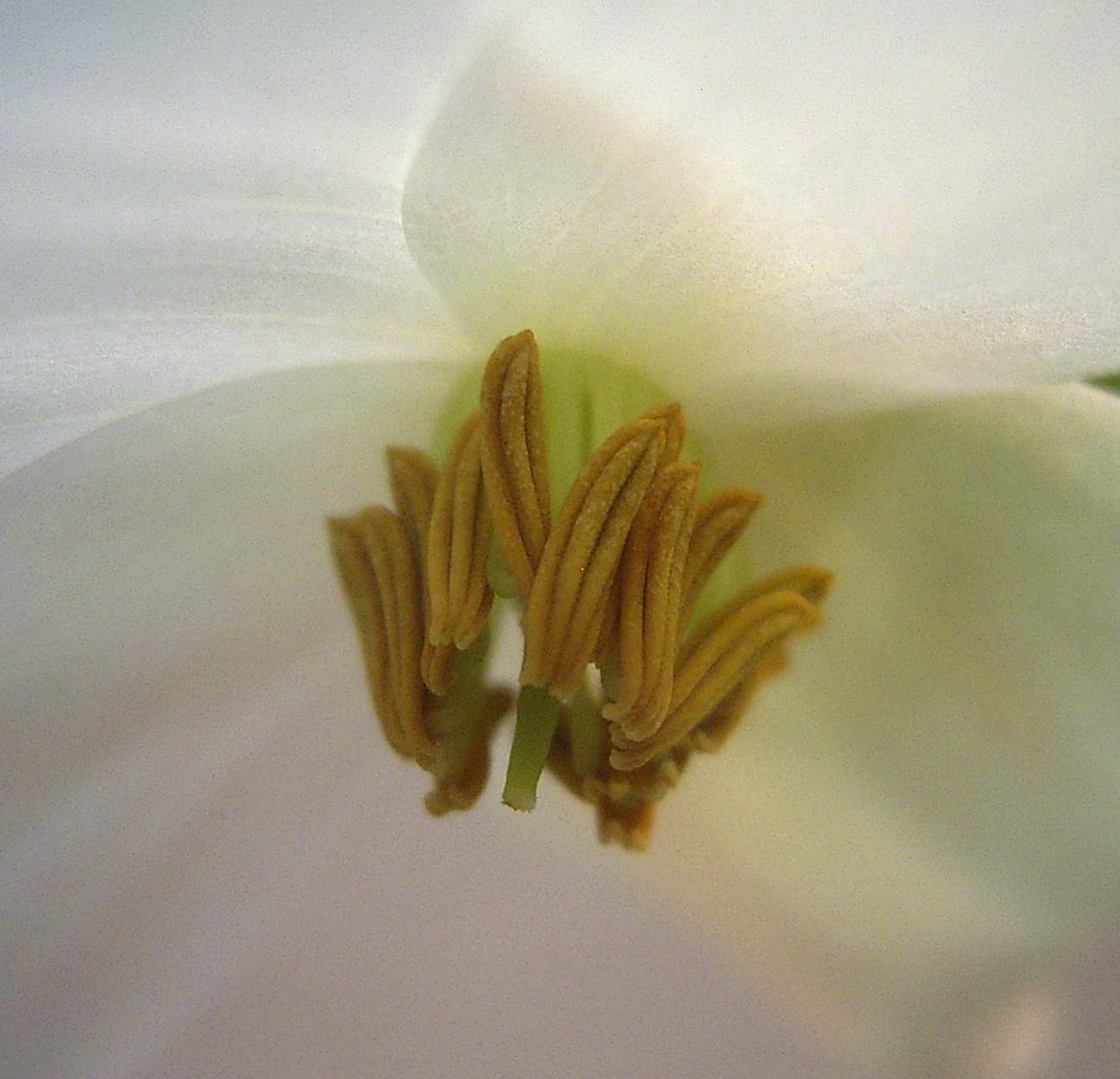
Detail of H. nutans flower

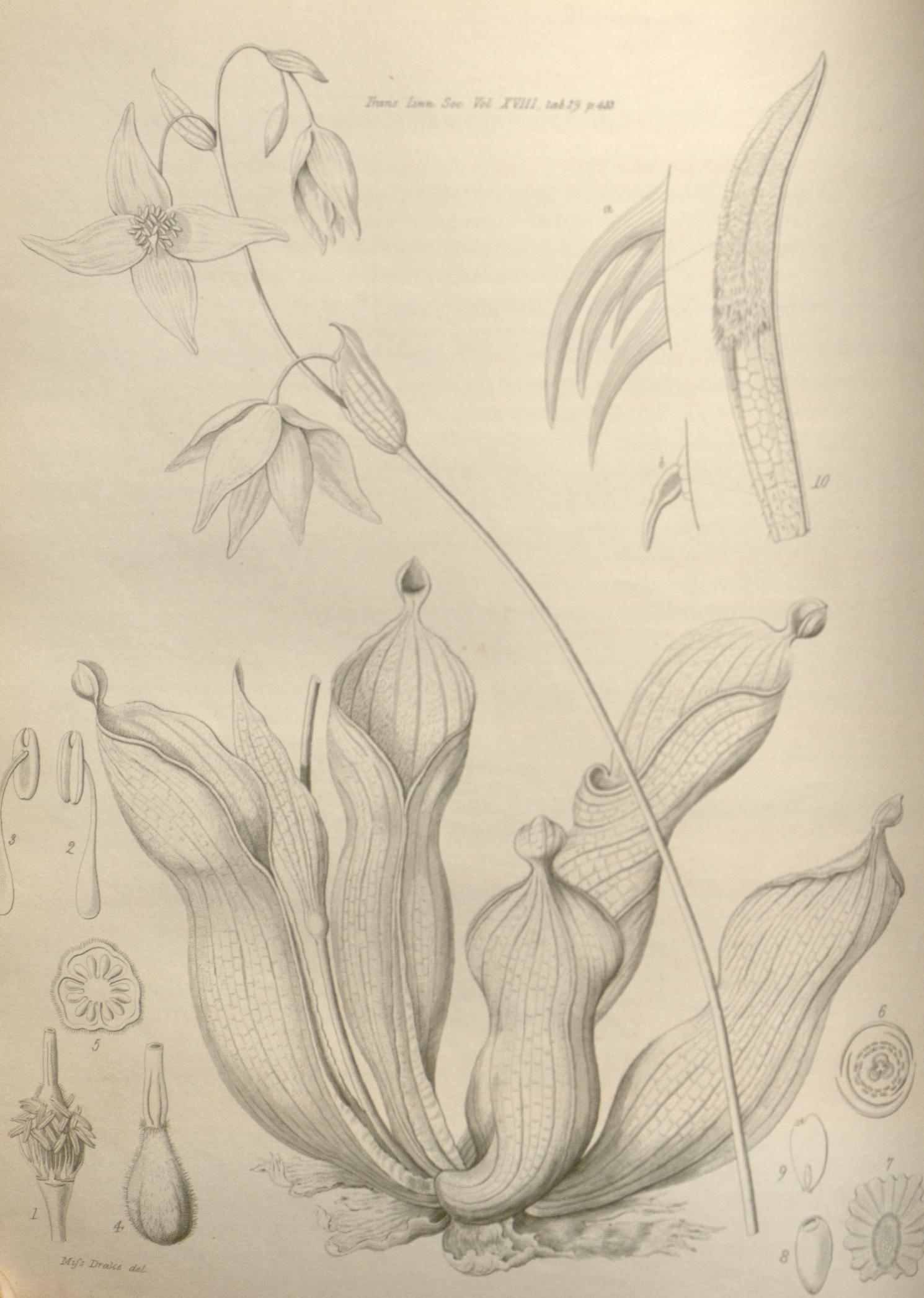
Illustration from Bentham's 1840 description
