= Cerro Avispa =

Mountain in Venezuela

- Location within Venezuela

Highest point
- Elevation: 1,600 m (5,200 ft)
- Coordinates: 01°20′10″N 65°52′44″W

Geography
- Location: Amazonas, Venezuela

Cerro Avispa is a tepui in Amazonas state, Venezuela. Part of the Neblina–Aracamuni Massif, it lies south of Cerro Aracamuni (with which it shares a common slope area) and north of Cerro de la Neblina. Cerro Avispa and Cerro Aracamuni have a combined summit area of 238 km^{2} (92 sq mi) and an estimated combined slope area of 658 km^{2} (254 sq mi). Both of these cerro-plateaus have a maximum elevation of around 1,600 metres (5,200 ft).

== See also ==
- Distribution of Heliamphora
