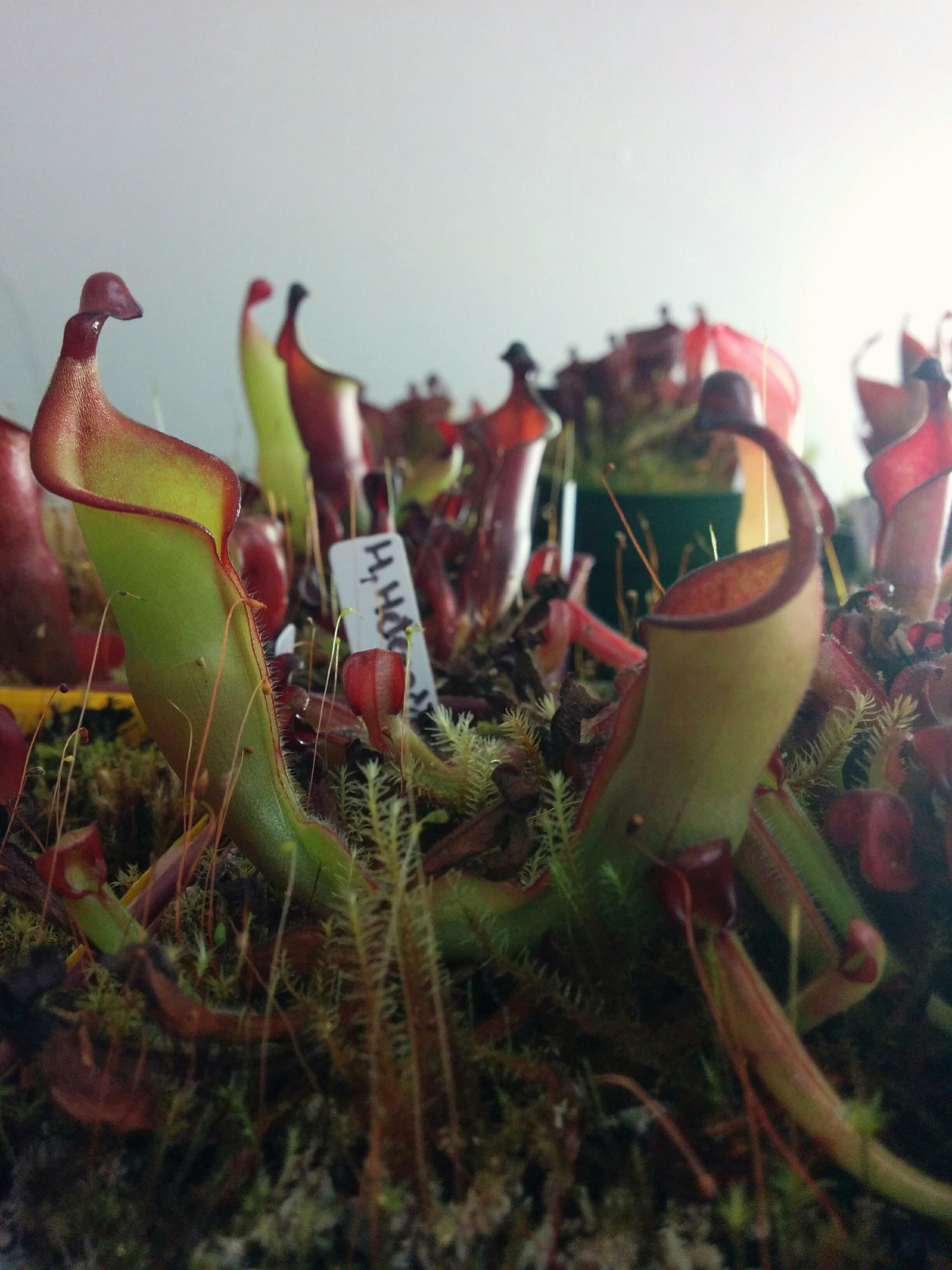
- Heliamphora heterodoxa in cultivation

Scientific classification
- Kingdom: Plantae
- Clade: Tracheophytes
- Clade: Angiosperms
- Clade: Eudicots
- Clade: Asterids
- Order: Ericales
- Family: Sarraceniaceae
- Genus: Heliamphora
- Species: H. heterodoxa

Binomial name
- Heliamphora heterodoxa Steyerm. (1951)
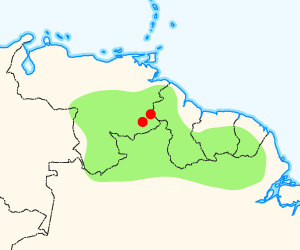
- Native range

Synonyms
- Heliamphora heterodoxa auct. non Steyerm.: G.Cheers (1992) [=H. nutans]

= Heliamphora heterodoxa =

Species of Marsh Pitcher Plant native to Gran Sabana, Venezuela

Heliamphora heterodoxa (Greek: heteros = other, doxa = opinion, belief) is a species of marsh pitcher plant native to Venezuela and adjacent Guyana. It was first discovered in 1944 on the slopes interlinking Ptari-tepui and Sororopan-tepui and formally described in 1951.

This Heliamphora is closely related to H. glabra and the latter was for a long time considered a form of H. heterodoxa. It is one of four Heliamphora taxa formally described by Julian A. Steyermark.

Heliamphora heterodoxa is known to tolerate slightly higher temperatures compared to other Heliamphora species, due to its habitats being located in upland wetlands and lower elevation Pantepui habitats (approx. 1200m - 1500m a.s.l.). The plant grows vigorously and exhibits a large, overhanging nectar spoon.

== Etymology ==
The name "heterodoxa", meaning "variable", was given to the species by J.A. Steyermark who had observed that "considerable variation occurs within this species". An expedition to the locus classicus of H. heterodoxa on the southwestern slopes of Ptari-tepui undertaken in May 2018 confirmed occurrences of one other species of Heliamphora, H. collina, as well as a H. collina x purpurascens hybrid swarm being present at the very same location.

== Infraspecific taxa ==
- Heliamphora heterodoxa var. exappendiculata Maguire & Steyerm. (1978) [=H. exappendiculata]
- Heliamphora heterodoxa var. exappendiculata f. glabella Steyerm. (1984) [=H. minor]
- Heliamphora heterodoxa var. glabra Maguire (1978) [=H. glabra]
- Heliamphora heterodoxa f. glabra (Maguire) Steyerm. (1984) [=H. glabra]
