= Otto Huber (ecologist) =

Italian ecologist (born 1944)

Otto Huber (born 1944 in Bischofswiesen, Bavaria, Germany) is an Italian ecologist known for his work on the botany, phytogeography and conservation of the neotropics. His academic focus has primarily been on the non-forested biomes of the Venezuelan Guayana. Beginning in the 1970s, he led many pioneering expeditions to the inaccessible tepuis (table mountains) of the region. Huber has authored over 120 publications, including most of the first volume of Flora of the Venezuelan Guayana. As a plant collector, Huber was most active around the period 1974–1999. His herbarium collections number more than 13,500 specimens, each with three to four duplicates on average. Huber worked closely with Julian A. Steyermark, one of his early mentors.

== Early life and education ==
Born in Germany, Huber grew up and studied in Merano, Italy, and graduated from the State University of Rome in the fields of Botany and Ecology (1971). While in Rome in 1966, he was given an offer to travel to Venezuela for a year to carry out field work in the newly created Estación Biológica de los Llanos in Calabozo (Guárico state). Here he met Prof. Volkmar Vareschi and Dr. Julian Steyermark, and they became his main mentors, influential in his decision to focus on the field of botany. He then studied for a PhD in botany at the State University of Innsbruck (Austria), during which he undertook fieldwork in Venezuela, in the cloud forests at Rancho Grande in Aragua State.

== Research ==
Huber's fields of scientific interest include the flora and phytogeography of the neotropics and the vegetation of Venezuela's non-forest biomes, but he has also taken part in systematic research in the Humiriaceae family with José Cuatrecasas. Between 1972 and 1982, Huber took part in, organised and led over 80 multidisciplinary expeditions in Venezuela and Brazil. From its beginning in 1977, he has maintained an intimate link with the Ministry of Environment of Venezuela (MARNR) and has been the leader of two of their research projects to study the tepui ecosystem. He has always concentrated on non-forest ecosystems (shrublands, herbaceous ecosystems and rock pioneers) and the species he has collected reflect this interest; he has amassed a collection of over 13,500 specimens with an average of three to four duplicates each.

Huber is involved in conservation in the realm of protected area designation, in both their scientific justification and physical delimitation; his work has resulted in the designation of the largest neotropical biosphere reserve (Alto Orinoco-Casiquiare 1991), also the Canaima World Heritage Site and the Tepuis Natural Monument. From 1986 to 2003, he completed many cartographic projects, creating several maps of the vegetation of southern Venezuela and Guayana and two for the whole of South America.

In 1991, botanist John Francis Pruski named a genus of flowering plants (in the family Asteraceae) Huberopappus honouring Huber.

One important project for Huber was the databasing of concepts and definitions to aid the classification of vegetation in tropical and subtropical America. Since 2004, he has worked for the UNESCO sponsored project 'CoroLab Humboldt', creating the database 'Fitored' with over 10,000 titles on phytogeography and plant ecology.

Between 1999 and 2001 Huber worked as a professor of botany and phytogeography at the Universidad Simón Bolívar in Caracas, tutoring several theses; he has always tried to transmit his knowledge into the scientific community and in 1990 established a peer-reviewed monographic series Scientia Guaianæ, to stimulate young scientists working between the Amazon and Orinoco rivers. He himself has created over 120 publications. In 2002, he was appointed scientific coordinator of the International Workshop on Biological Priority Setting for Conservation of the Guiana Shield (Conservation International and IUCN). From 2005 Huber has been scientific advisor to the president of the Fundación Instituto Botánico de Venezuela, in Caracas.

== See also ==
- Charles Brewer-Carías
