= Charles Brewer-Carías =

Venezuelan explorer and naturalist

- Born: September 10, 1938 (age 87); Caracas, Venezuela
- Scientific career
- Fields: Natural history

Charles Brewer-Carías (born 10 September 1938 in Caracas, Venezuela) is a Venezuelan explorer and naturalist. Known as the "Humboldt of the twentieth century", Brewer-Carías has led more than 200 expeditions to remote parts of the Venezuelan Guayana, particularly the tepuis (table mountains) of the region. His discoveries include the sink holes of Cerro Sarisariñama and the world's largest known quartzite cave, Cueva Charles Brewer. In 1982, Charles invented a survival knife.

== Recognitions ==
Around 27 species of animals and plants have been named in his honour, including the bromeliad genus Brewcaria.

In 2025, he received the Paez Medal of Art from the Venezuelan American Endowment for the Arts in recognition of his extensive work as a Venezuelan naturalist, ethnographer, and explorer.

== See also ==
- Napoleon Chagnon
- Jacques Lizot
- Julian A. Steyermark
- Otto Huber (ecologist)
