= Julian Alfred Steyermark =

American botanist (1909–1988)

- Born: January 27, 1909; St. Louis, Missouri
- Died: October 15, 1988 (aged 79)
- Known for: Research in New World vegetation, Specialist in the family Rubiaceae
- Scientific career
- Fields: Botany
- Workplaces: Field Museum of Chicago, Instituto Botánico of Caracas, Missouri Botanical Garden
- Thesis: (1933)
- Author abbrev. (botany): Steyerm.

Julian Alfred Steyermark (January 27, 1909 – October 15, 1988) was a Venezuelan American botanist. His focus was on New World vegetation, and he specialized in the family Rubiaceae.

== Life and work ==
Julian Alfred Steyermark was born in St. Louis, Missouri as the only child of the businessman Leo L. Steyermark and Mamie I. Steyermark (née Isaacs). He studied at the Henry Shaw School of Botany at Washington University in St. Louis, where he completed his Ph.D. in 1933. His distinguished career included the Field Museum of Chicago, the Instituto Botánico of Caracas, and he was with the Missouri Botanical Garden in St. Louis from 1984 until his death. Steyermark's major works were his Flora of the Venezuelan Guayana, Flora of Missouri, and his Flora of Guatemala.

During his life, Steyermark collected over 130,000 plants in twenty-six countries, which earned him an entry in the Guinness Book of World Records. He made the initial descriptions of 2,392 taxa of plants, including one family, 38 genera, and 1,864 species.

The standard author abbreviation Steyerm. is used to indicate Steyermark when citing a botanical name.

== Honours ==
Julian Alfred Steyermark is honoured in several genera of South American plants;

- Steyermarkina is a genus of plants within the Asteraceae family,
- Steyermarkochloa is a genus of plants in the Poaceae family.
- Steyerbromelia in the family Bromeliaceae, published also in 1987,
- Steyermarkia (in the family Rubiaceae) was also named in his honor in 1940.
- Stanmarkia published in 1993, which is a genus of flowering plants from Mexico and Guatemala, belonging to the family Melastomataceae. The name also honours another American botanist Paul Carpenter Standley (1884–1963).

Steyermark is also commemorated in the scientific name of a species of South American snake, Atractus steyermarki.

== Major works ==
- Flora of Missouri (1963) Ames, Iowa: The Iowa State University Press. ISBN 0-8138-0655-0.
- Bromeliaceae of Venezuela with Francisco Oliva-Esteva (1987) Caracas, Venezuela: Graficas Armitano, C. A. ISBN 978-980-216-020-4

== See also ==
- Charles Brewer-Carías
- Otto Huber (ecologist)
