= Sarraceniaceae of South America =

- Cover showing H. pulchella from Amurí Tepui
- Author: Stewart McPherson, Andreas Wistuba, Andreas Fleischmann, Joachim Nerz
- Language: English
- Publisher: Redfern Natural History Productions
- Publication date: September 2011
- Media type: Print (hardcover)
- Pages: xii + 561
- ISBN: 9780955891878
- OCLC: 767839422

Sarraceniaceae of South America is a monograph on the pitcher plants of the genus Heliamphora by Stewart McPherson, Andreas Wistuba, Andreas Fleischmann, and Joachim Nerz. It was published in September 2011 by Redfern Natural History Productions and covered all species known at the time.

The book is part of a comprehensive two-volume work on the Sarraceniaceae. The other tome, Sarraceniaceae of North America, deals with the genera Darlingtonia and Sarracenia. Intended as the first volume, Sarraceniaceae of South America includes an introduction to the family Sarraceniaceae as a whole. Both volumes were nominees for the 2012 CBHL Annual Literature Award, in the Technical Interest category.

In addition to the main authors, others who worked on the book include Andy Smith and Wayne Jenski, who produced a number of anatomical illustrations, and taxonomist Jan Schlauer, who contributed to the formal species descriptions.

== Content ==
The book gives a detailed account of all 23 species of Heliamphora recognised at the time of its publication. This number includes four species described for the first time (H. arenicola, H. ceracea, H. collina, and H. purpurascens) and one raised to a species from infraspecific level (H. parva). A further two "incompletely diagnosed taxa" are also included. The authors recognise the following taxa:

1. H. arenicola
2. H. ceracea
3. H. chimantensis
4. H. ciliata
5. H. collina
6. H. elongata
7. H. exappendiculata
8. H. folliculata
9. H. glabra
10. H. heterodoxa
11. H. hispida
12. H. huberi
13. H. ionasi
14. H. macdonaldae
15. H. minor
  1. H. minor var. minor
  2. H. minor var. pilosa^{[a]}
16. H. neblinae
17. H. nutans
18. H. parva
19. H. pulchella
20. H. purpurascens
21. H. sarracenioides
22. H. tatei
23. H. uncinata

Incompletely diagnosed taxa

1. H. sp. 'Akopán Tepui'
2. H. sp. 'Angasima Tepui'

Additionally, an undescribed variant of H. pulchella from Amurí Tepui that lacks long retentive hairs is listed as H. pulchella 'Incompletely diagnosed taxon from Amurí Tepui'. All known natural hybrids are also covered.

The book includes a colour foldout map and 488 numbered figures.

== Reviews ==
Sarraceniaceae of South America received generally favourable reviews. Writing in the June 2012 issue of the Carnivorous Plant Newsletter, Barry Rice praised the book's detailed coverage, photography, and build quality, as well as the inclusion of "very useful" distribution maps for each species. However, he pointed out the lack of a botanical key as a significant omission. He suggested that the book's shortcomings are likely "due to an overly-speedy publication schedule at Redfern Natural History Productions". Summarising, Rice wrote that both Sarraceniaceae of South America and its sister volume "are beautiful books with wonderful images and lots of fascinating details".

A review by Nils Köster published in the June 2012 issue of Willdenowia was also positive, describing the two monographs as "the ideal companions for everybody interested in New World pitcher plants". However, the author found the book's treatment of synonyms "a little disappointing"—although present, they are "rather hidden within the text" and mostly absent from the index. The reviewer also noted the lack of an identification key, writing: "ultimately, a taxonomic concept which cannot be implemented in an identification key always leaves some room for doubt about its viability".

In his review for the September 2012 issue of the Botanical Journal of the Linnean Society, Michael F. Fay described the two tomes as "beautifully illustrated", adding: "these authoritative volumes will be important books for all who wish to study New World pitcher plants [...] No library of books on carnivorous plants will be complete without [them]".

== Notes ==
a. Heliamphora minor var. pilosa was only formally described in 2012 and therefore appeared in Sarraceniaceae of South America as a nomen nudum.
