= Heliamphora huberi =

Scientific classification
- Kingdom: Plantae
- Clade: Tracheophytes
- Clade: Angiosperms
- Clade: Eudicots
- Clade: Asterids
- Order: Ericales
- Family: Sarraceniaceae
- Genus: Heliamphora
- Species: H. huberi

Binomial name
- Heliamphora huberi A.Fleischm., Wistuba & Nerz (2009)

Species of carnivorous plant

Heliamphora huberi is a species of Marsh Pitcher Plant endemic to the Chimantá Massif in Venezuela, where it grows at elevations of 1850–2200 m in a variety of habitats. It has thus far been recorded from Angasima-tepui, Apacará-tepui, Amurí-tepui, Acopán-tepui, and the border of Torono- and Chimantá-tepui. Due to its intermediate appearance between species related to H. minor and H. heterodoxa, it is suspected to be of hybridogenic origin.
