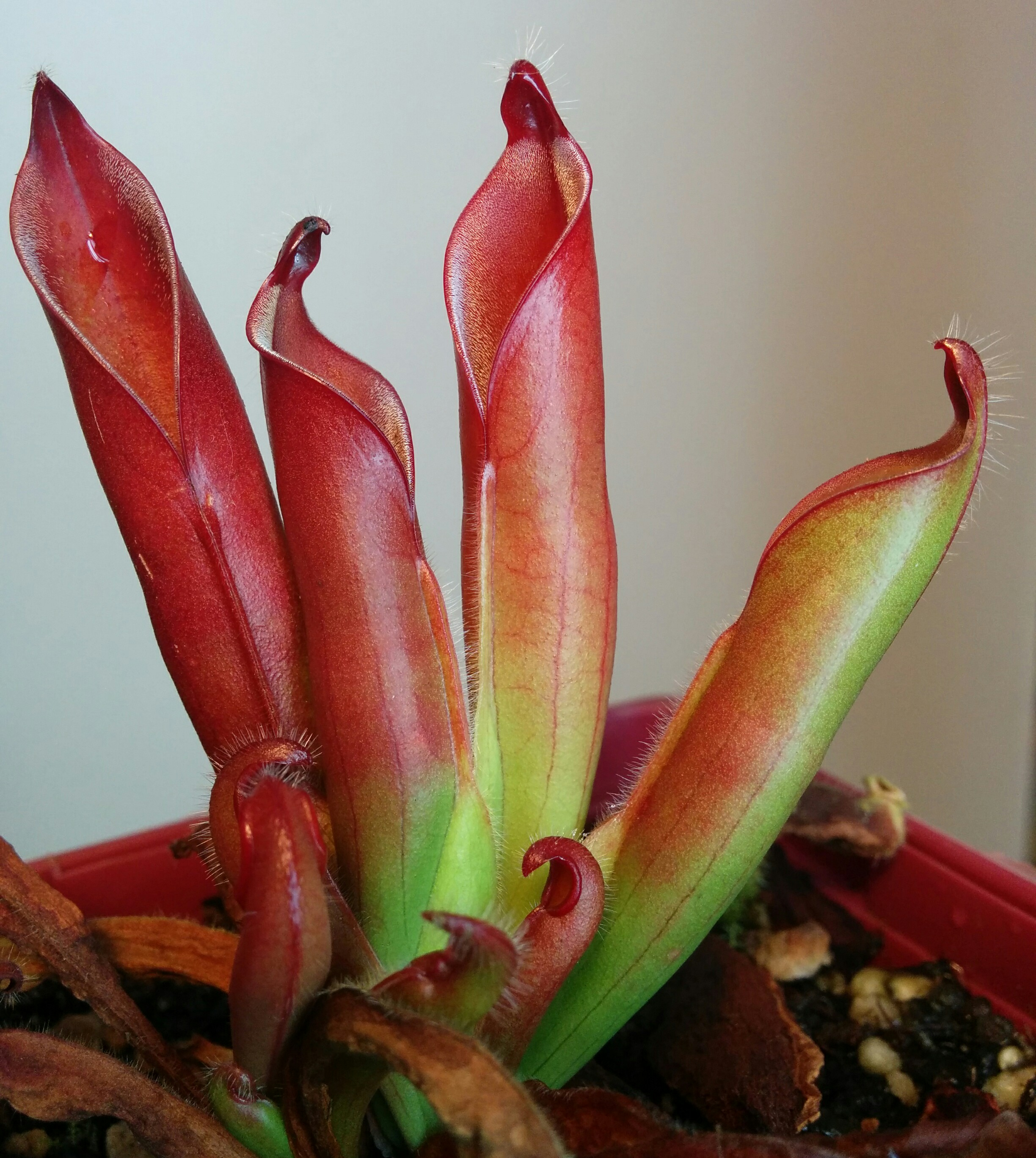
- Heliamphora ceracea in cultivation.

Scientific classification
- Kingdom: Plantae
- Clade: Tracheophytes
- Clade: Angiosperms
- Clade: Eudicots
- Clade: Asterids
- Order: Ericales
- Family: Sarraceniaceae
- Genus: Heliamphora
- Species: H. ceracea

Binomial name
- Heliamphora ceracea Nerz, Wistuba, Grantsau, Rivadavia, A.Fleischm. & S.McPherson (2011)

= Heliamphora ceracea =

Species of carnivorous plant

Heliamphora ceracea is a species of marsh pitcher plant known only from the Brazilian side of Pico da Neblina in the Neblina Massif. It has been collected from an elevation of 1900 m.
