= Heliamphora collina =

Scientific classification
- Kingdom: Plantae
- Clade: Tracheophytes
- Clade: Angiosperms
- Clade: Eudicots
- Clade: Asterids
- Order: Ericales
- Family: Sarraceniaceae
- Genus: Heliamphora
- Species: H. collina

Binomial name
- Heliamphora collina Wistuba, Nerz, S.McPherson & A.Fleischm. (2011)

Species of carnivorous plant

Heliamphora collina is a species of marsh pitcher plant known from the Los Testigos and Ptari-tepui massifs in Venezuela It grows at elevations of 1700–1825 m. The first specimens of the species were first collected by Otto Huber, Julian Steyermark and others in 1986 and originally classified as Heliamphora heterodoxa. After additional in-situ studies it was described as a new species in 2011 by Andreas Wistuba, Joachim Nerz, Stewart McPherson and Andreas Fleischmann.

First believed to be endemic to the common foothills of the four tepuis of the Los Testigos chain, observations of plants possibly matching the description of Heliamphora collina had been made from a distance during helicopter expeditions to the summit of Ptari-tepui in 2009 and 2017. Specimens of Heliamphora collina were later confirmed to occur on the southwestern slopes of Ptari-tepui by Mateusz Wrazidlo during an expedition to the massif in 2018.
