= Heliamphora uncinata =

Scientific classification
- Kingdom: Plantae
- Clade: Tracheophytes
- Clade: Angiosperms
- Clade: Eudicots
- Clade: Asterids
- Order: Ericales
- Family: Sarraceniaceae
- Genus: Heliamphora
- Species: H. uncinata

Binomial name
- Heliamphora uncinata Nerz, Wistuba & A.Fleischm. (2009)

Species of carnivorous plant

Heliamphora uncinata is a species of Marsh Pitcher Plant endemic to Venezuela. This species of carnivorous plant is known as a pitcher plant. Individuals use tube like leaves to trap insects that slip into the bottom. At the bottom of the "pitcher" there are digestive juices which slowly digest the prey item to give the plant additional nutrients. The pitchers of this species are around 25–35 cm long, and are 8–10 cm wide at the opening. The pitcher mouth is circular in shape and the back is raised to form the lid. It is known only from the type collection, which was made in a narrow canyon on Amurí-tepui. There it grows at an elevation of approximately 1850 m on sandstone cliff faces in shady conditions. It is also found in humus pockets and cracks at this location. The only other species in the genus known to have a similar growth habit is H. exappendiculata. These two taxa also share a number of morphological features and appear to be closely related. These shared morphological features include: the shape of pitchers, the general growth pattern, and appearance of nectaries (nectar producing organs).
