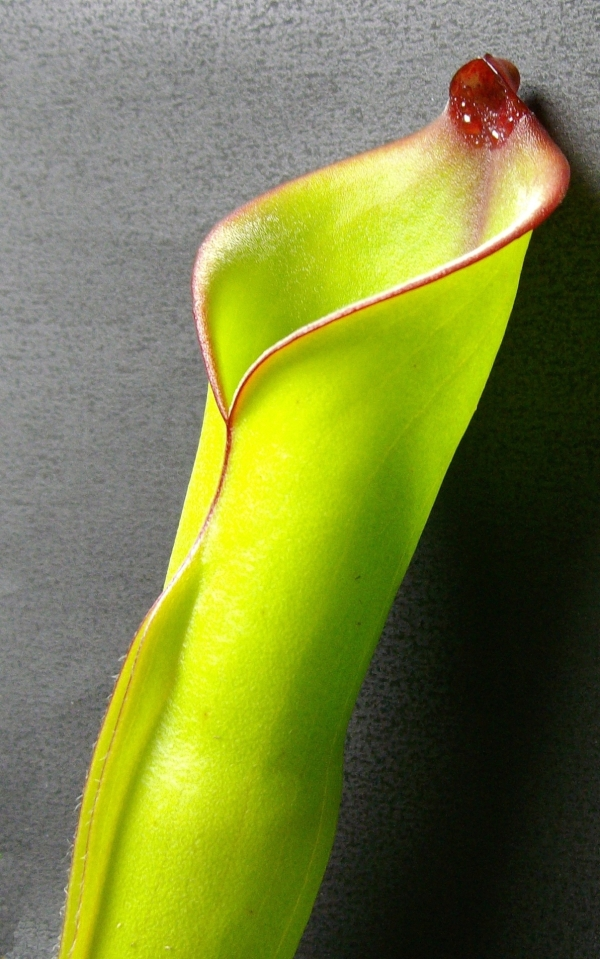

Scientific classification
- Kingdom: Plantae
- Clade: Tracheophytes
- Clade: Angiosperms
- Clade: Eudicots
- Clade: Asterids
- Order: Ericales
- Family: Sarraceniaceae
- Genus: Heliamphora
- Species: H. purpurascens

Binomial name
- Heliamphora purpurascens Wistuba, A.Fleischm., Nerz & S.McPherson (2011)

= Heliamphora purpurascens =

Species of carnivorous plant

Heliamphora purpurascens is a species of marsh pitcher plant known only from the summit area of Ptari Tepui in Venezuela, where it grows at elevations of 2,400–2,500 m.
