= Heliamphora arenicola =

Scientific classification
- Kingdom: Plantae
- Clade: Tracheophytes
- Clade: Angiosperms
- Clade: Eudicots
- Clade: Asterids
- Order: Ericales
- Family: Sarraceniaceae
- Genus: Heliamphora
- Species: H. arenicola

Binomial name
- Heliamphora arenicola Wistuba, A.Fleischm., Nerz & S.McPherson (2011)

Species of carnivorous plant

Heliamphora arenicola is a species of marsh pitcher plant known only from the western side of the Ilu–Tramen Massif in Venezuela's Gran Sabana, where it grows at elevations of less than 2000 m. It may also occur on Karaurin Tepui.
