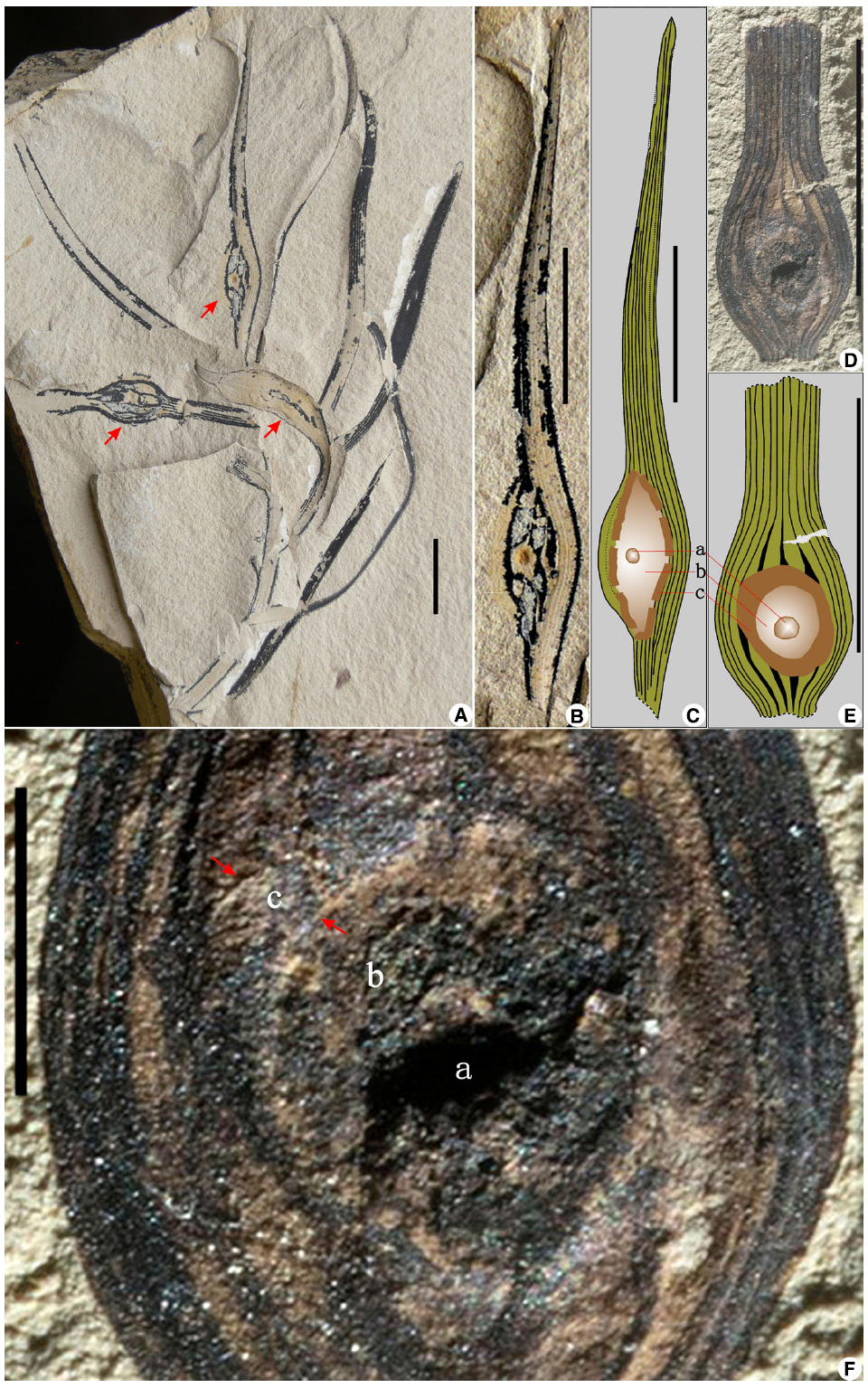
- Fossils of A. longicervia described in Wong et al. (2015)

Scientific classification
- Kingdom: Plantae
- Clade: Tracheophytes
- Clade: Gymnospermae
- Division: Pinophyta
- Class: Pinopsida
- Order: Pinales
- Family: incertae sedis
- Genus: †Archaeamphora; H.Q.Li
- Species: †A. longicervia

Binomial name
- †Archaeamphora longicervia H.Q.Li (2005)

= Archaeamphora =

Archaeamphora Temporal range: Early Cretaceous

Fossil species of Cretaceous-aged flowering plant

Archaeamphora longicervia is a fossil plant species, the only member of the hypothetical genus Archaeamphora. Fossil material assigned to this taxon originates from the Yixian Formation of northeastern China, dated to the Early Cretaceous (around 143 to 101 million years ago).

The species was originally described as a pitcher plant with close affinities to extant members of the family Sarraceniaceae. This would make it the earliest known carnivorous plant and the only known fossil record of Sarraceniaceae, or the New World pitcher plant family. Archaeamphora is also one of the three oldest known genera of angiosperms (flowering plants). Li (2005) wrote that "the existence of a so highly derived Angiosperm in the Early Cretaceous suggests that Angiosperms should have originated much earlier, maybe back to 280 mya as the molecular clock studies suggested".

Subsequent authors have questioned the identification of Archaeamphora as a pitcher plant and a taxon of angiosperm at all. The fossils more probably represent leaves (needles) of the coniferous Liaoningocladus boii deformed by insect galls.

== Etymology ==
The generic name Archaeamphora is derived from the Greek αρχαίος, archaíos ("ancient"; combining form in Latin: archae-), and ἀμφορεύς, amphoreus ("pitcher"). The specific epithet longicervia is derived from the Latin longus ("long") and cervicarius ("with a neck"), in reference to the characteristic constriction in the pitcher-like structures of this species.

== Fossil material ==
All known fossil material of A. longicervia originates from the Jianshangou Formation in Beipiao, western Liaoning, China. These Early Cretaceous beds constitute the lower part of the Yixian Formation, which is dated at 124.6 million years old. Nine specimens of A. longicervia have been found, including holotype CBO0220 and paratype CBO0754.

== Description ==
Archaeamphora longicervia was supposed to be a herbaceous plant growing to around 50 mm (2.0 in) in height. The stem, at least 21 mm (0.83 in) long by 1.2 mm (0.047 in) wide, bore distinctive vertical ridges and grooves. The pitcher-like structures were ascidiate in form and 30 to 40 mm (1.2 to 1.6 in) long. Mature pitchers and underdeveloped pitchers or phyllodia-like leaves were arranged spirally around the stem. Pitchers consisted of a tubular base, expanded middle section, constriction around the mouth, and a vertical, spoon-shaped lid. A single wing ran down the adaxial side of each pitcher. Three to five parallel major veins were present on the pitchers, along with a few intercostal veins and numerous small veinlets.

Two unusual bag-like structures were present on each pitcher, one on either side of the central wing. Similar but semi-circular structures were found on the margin of the lid. These structures exhibited strong yellow-green intrinsic fluorescence when exposed to visible light with a wavelength of 500 nm (blue-green).

Tiny glands, approximately 4 μm in diameter, were found on the inner surface of the pitchers and partially embedded in the grooves along the veins. These also showed very strong golden-yellow fluorescence.

A single seed was found intimately associated with the fossil material of A. longicervia and is presumed to belong to the same species. It is winged and reticulate-tuberculate in morphology, closely resembling the seeds of Sarraceniaceae taxa. The seed is oval-shaped, covered with black-brown warts, and measures 0.9 by 1.25 mm (0.035 by 0.049 in).

== Taxonomy ==
The fossil material of A. longicervia was subjected to chemical analysis for oleanane, considered a key marker differentiating angiosperms from gymnosperms. Oleanane was detected in these specimens, suggesting that they belong to the angiosperms.

=== Pitcher plant interpretation ===
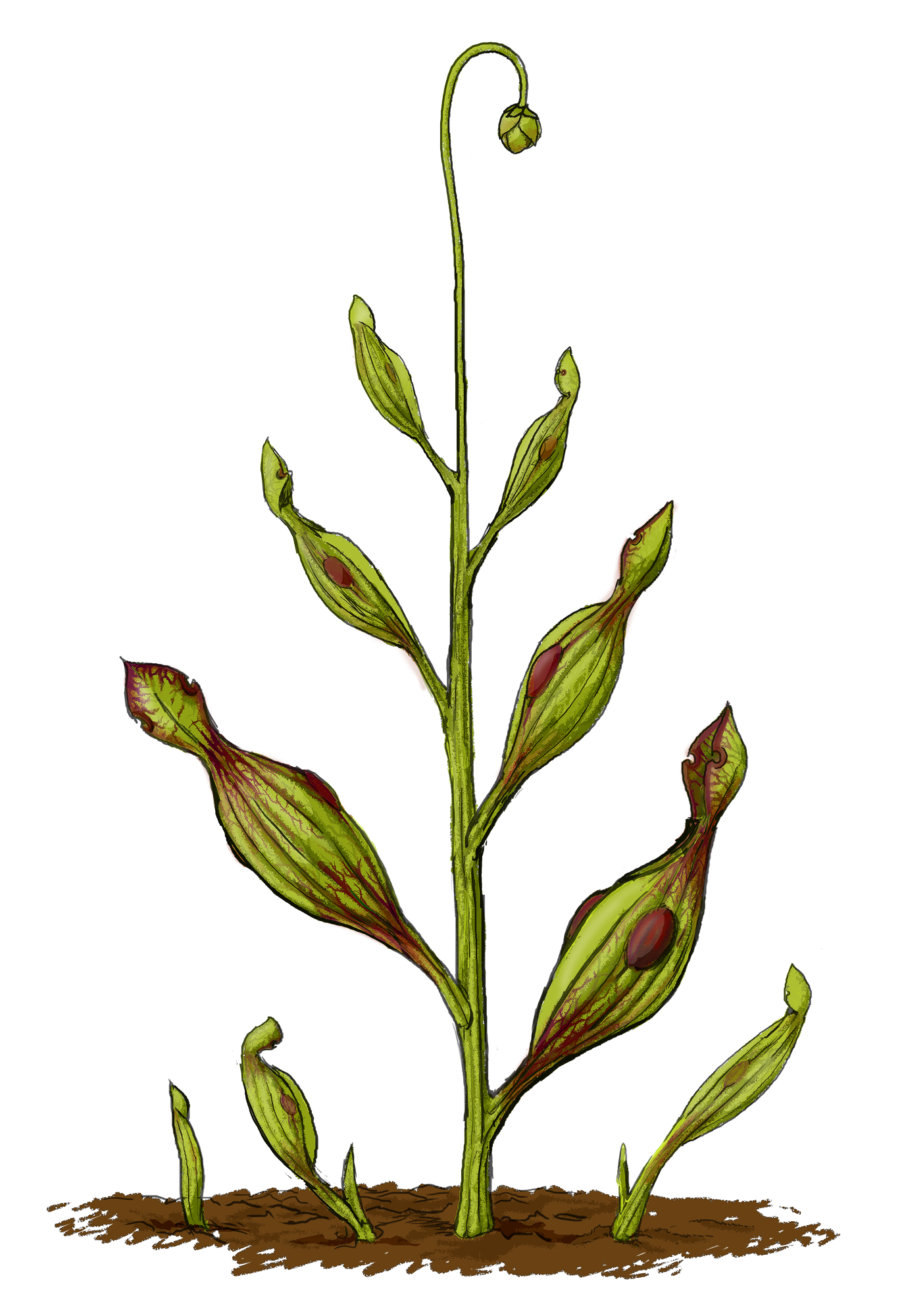
Artist's reconstruction of Archaeamphora longicervia as pitcher plant, after Li (2005)

According to Li (2005), several morphological features of A. longicervia indicate a close relationship to Sarraceniaceae: both taxa exhibit one or two pitcher wings, a smooth peristome, and pitchers that extend vertically from the top of a short petiole.

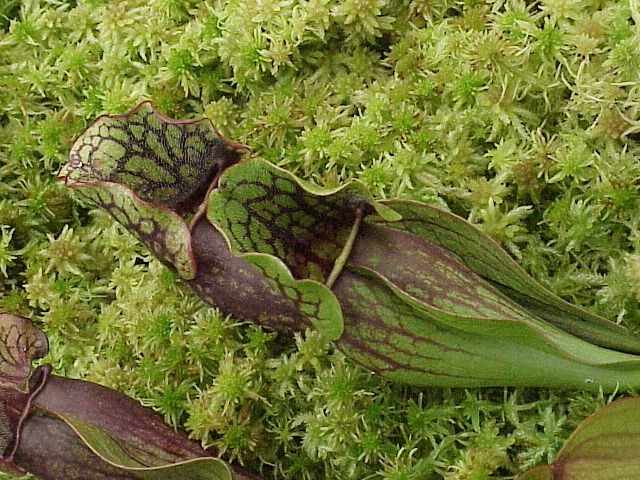
Pitchers of Sarracenia purpurea

Li (2005) suggests that A. longicervia is morphologically similar to modern Sarracenia purpurea. It shares with this species the spiral arrangement of its pitchers and phyllodia-like tubular leaves with parallel major veins. Archaeamphora longicervia also shows a resemblance to species of the genus Heliamphora in having pitchers with a long neck and upright lid. Of particular note is the similarity between the thick semi-circular structures on the lid of A. longicervia and the large nectar-secreting "bubble" present on the upper posterior portion of Heliamphora exappendiculata (Note: This taxon was recognised as a variety of Heliamphora heterodoxa when Archaeamphora was described in 2005. It was raised to species rank the following year.) pitchers.

Li (2005) mentions the discovery of another type of "pitcher plant" from the same formation. This variety differs from the type material of A. longicervia in having pitchers that lack any constriction before the mouth, instead gradually expanding from the petiole into a hollow trumpet-like shape. He suggests that it "should be a different species" from A. longicervia. An intermediate form with a wider neck is also reported, suggesting that these plants were already a diversified group in the Early Cretaceous.

=== Current understanding ===
Heřmanová & Kvaček (2010) opined that the pitcher plant interpretation of Archaeamphora is "problematic and the fossil is in need of revision".

In their 2011 book, Sarraceniaceae of South America, McPherson et al. summarised current thinking on Archaeamphora as follows:

Serious doubt is emerging that reduces the likelihood that Archaeamphora longicervia belongs in the Sarraceniaceae lineage, or was even a pitcher plant at all. [...] Although Archaeamphora might well be a representative of the earliest flowering plants on Earth [...] it is very unlikely that it represents an ancestor of Sarraceniaceae since it is much too old to be part of the advanced "crown group" of Ericales to which Sarraceniaceae belong. [...] Another contradiction is that except for Archaeamphora, there is no other evidence to suggest that Sarraceniaceae evolved outside the New World, to which all extant members of the family are endemic.

Wong et al. (2015) put forward a new perspective as follows:

Archaeamphora longicervia H. Q. Li was described as an herbaceous, Sarraceniaceae-like pitcher plant from the mid Early Cretaceous Yixian Formation of Liaoning Province, northeastern China. Here, a re-investigation of A. longicervia specimens from the Yixian Formation provides new insights into its identity and the morphology of pitcher plants claimed by Li. We demonstrate that putative pitchers of Archaeamphora are insect-induced leaf galls that consist of three components: (1) an innermost larval chamber; (2) an intermediate zone of nutritive tissue; and (3) an outermost wall of sclerenchyma. Archaeamphora is not a carnivorous, Sarraceniaceae-like angiosperm, but represents insect-galled leaves of the previously reported gymnosperm Liaoningocladus boii G. Sun et al. from the Yixian Formation.

== Habitat ==
The area inhabited by A. longicervia is thought to have experienced significant climatic fluctuations during the Early Cretaceous, ranging from arid or semi-arid to more humid conditions. The substrate in the region was mostly composed of lacustrine sediments and volcanic rocks.

== See also ==
- Cephalotus follicularis, an Australian carnivorous plant whose pitcher traps are convergently similar to those of Nepenthes
