= Heliamphora ciliata =

Scientific classification
- Kingdom: Plantae
- Clade: Tracheophytes
- Clade: Angiosperms
- Clade: Eudicots
- Clade: Asterids
- Order: Ericales
- Family: Sarraceniaceae
- Genus: Heliamphora
- Species: H. ciliata

Binomial name
- Heliamphora ciliata Wistuba, Nerz & A.Fleischm. (2009)

Species of carnivorous plant

Heliamphora ciliata is a species of Marsh Pitcher Plant endemic to Venezuela. It is restricted to a small number of swampy meadows in the uplands of Gran Sabana. In this habitat it is sympatric with a species of Stegolepis (Rapateaceae). Unusually for the genus, H. ciliata is a submontane plant, growing at an elevation of only 900 m.
