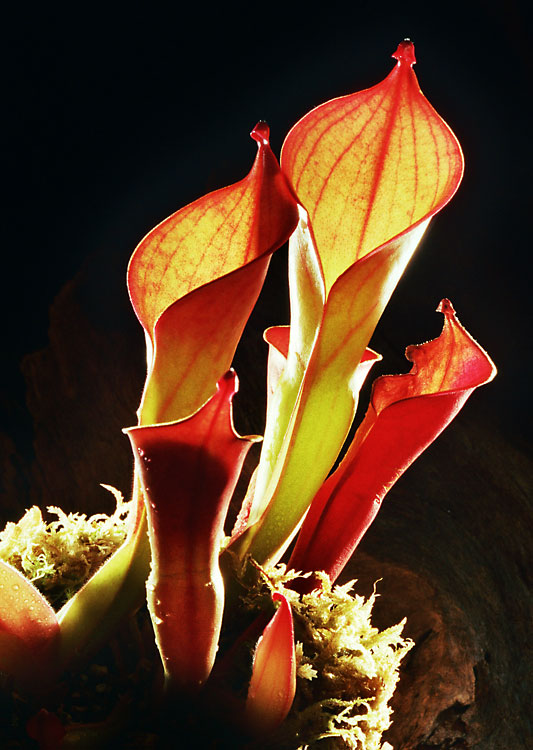

Scientific classification
- Kingdom: Plantae
- Clade: Tracheophytes
- Clade: Angiosperms
- Clade: Eudicots
- Clade: Asterids
- Order: Ericales
- Family: Sarraceniaceae
- Genus: Heliamphora
- Species: H. ionasi

Binomial name
- Heliamphora ionasi Maguire (1978)

Synonyms
- ?Heliamphora recens Hort.Westphal (1991) nom.nud.

= Heliamphora ionasi =

Species of carnivorous plant

Heliamphora ionasi is a species of marsh pitcher plant thought to be endemic to the plateau that lies between the bases of Ilu Tepui and Tramen Tepui in Venezuela. It produces the largest pitchers in the genus, which can be up to 50 cm in height.

The species was discovered by a team led by Bassett Maguire and comprising, among others, Jonah Boyan. The specific epithet ionasi is based on a Latinised form of Boyan's first name. A photograph by Maguire showing Boyan holding a specimen of H. ionasi was featured on the front cover of the September 1979 issue of the Carnivorous Plant Newsletter.

== Notes ==
a. The specific epithet is commonly misspelled ionasii in most recent literature. The correct form of this commemorative epithet is ionasi. This spelling is used consistently in Maguire's original description, as well as on herbarium sheets of the type specimens collected by Maguire on the William H. Phelps Jr. Expedition to Ilu Tepui in 1952.
