= Carnivorous Plant Newsletter =

- Volume 8, issue 3 (September 1979)
- Discipline: Botany
- Language: English
- Edited by: Bob Ziemer

Publication details
- History: 1972–present
- Publisher: International Carnivorous Plant Society (United States)
- Frequency: Quarterly

Standard abbreviations
- ISO 4: Carniv. Plant Newsl.

Indexing
- ISSN: 0190-9215
- OCLC no.: 4011202

Links
- Journal homepage

The Carnivorous Plant Newsletter is the official publication of the International Carnivorous Plant Society (ICPS), the largest such organization in the world. It is headquartered in Walnut Creek, California.

== History and editorship ==
First issue from April 1972. The titular illustration was created by Katsuhiko Kondo.

The newsletter has been published every year since its inception in 1972. It was first published as a stenciled product, with annual subscription priced at $1 for those in the contiguous United States, Mexico and Canada, and $2 for those living elsewhere. The first issue, from April 1972, opened with the following paragraph:

We certainly cannot say there was less work involved in preparing this newsletter than anticipated, but the work was more than countered by the pleasure of at last beginning to fill a void among carnivorous botanists: A regular channel of informal communication. We are extremely encouraged by your response thus far.

In 1972 the newsletter had around 25 subscribers; this number quickly grew to more than 100 by June 29 of that year and reached 600 in July 1976. In 2018, the quarterly print run is 1400 copies.

The newsletter began printing in a 6 by 9-inch format with color covers and limited color reproduction in some articles in volume 7 (1978). The publication was founded by Don Schnell and Joe Mazrimas. Additional early editors included Leo Song and Larry Mellichamp. In 1997, Don Schnell retired and the new editors Jan Schlauer and Barry Rice joined the editorial staff. Mazrimas left the editorial board in 1998, leaving the journal's production to Schlauer, Rice, and Steve Baker (for page layout). In 2010, Bob Ziemer became managing editor with assistance from Barry Rice, Jan Schlauer, Fernando Rivadavia, John Brittnacher, and Karl Herold.

Since December 2006, all back issues of the Carnivorous Plant Newsletter are available as PDFs from the website of the International Carnivorous Plant Society. Articles older than 1 year are open to non-members.

== Format ==
The newsletter publishes on a quarterly basis, in full colour, and totals around 130 pages annually. Articles of scientific interest must pass through an anonymous peer-review process before being published. Typical articles also include matters of horticultural interest, field reports, literature reviews, synopses of new literature, and new taxa or cultivar descriptions. The newsletter has been a registration authority for cultivars of carnivorous plants since 1979, and in 1998, was appointed by the International Society for Horticultural Science as the International Cultivar Registration Authority for new carnivorous plant cultivars.

== Review ==
In a 1990 review published in the journal Taxon, Rudolf Schmid generally praised the publication, saying "over the past decade [it] has developed into one of the most attractive newsletters available, so appealing, in fact, that many libraries put the journal under lock". He also noted, however, that the lack of a contents page and the tendency to run articles over several discontinuous pages were "annoying". These deficiencies were rapidly corrected by the CPN editors.

== Taxon descriptions ==
The Carnivorous Plant Newsletter has published formal descriptions of the following taxa.

=== Drosera ===
- Drosera camporupestris
- Drosera grantsaui
- Drosera hartmeyerorum
- Drosera schwackei (new combination)
- Drosera spatulata var. bakoensis
- Drosera spatulata var. gympiensis
- Drosera tentaculata
- Drosera viridis
- Drosera × corinthiaca
- Drosera × fontinalis

=== Heliamphora ===
- Heliamphora chimantensis
- Heliamphora elongata
- Heliamphora exappendiculata
- Heliamphora folliculata
- Heliamphora hispida
- Heliamphora sarracenioides

=== Nepenthes ===
- Nepenthes angasanensis
- Nepenthes carunculata var. robusta
- Nepenthes lavicola
- Nepenthes longifolia
- Nepenthes mikei
- Nepenthes nebularum
- Nepenthes ovata
- Nepenthes rowaniae (emended description)
- Nepenthes sibuyanensis
- Nepenthes talangensis
- Nepenthes tenuis
- Nepenthes xiphioides

=== Pinguicula ===
- Pinguicula lithophytica
- Pinguicula nivalis
- Pinguicula pilosa

=== Sarracenia ===
- Sarracenia × bellii
- Sarracenia × casei
- Sarracenia × charlesmoorei
- Sarracenia flava var. cuprea
- Sarracenia flava var. rubricorpora
- Sarracenia × naczii
- Sarracenia purpurea subsp. venosa var. burkii f. luteola

=== Cultivars ===
The newsletter has also published a number of cultivar names.
