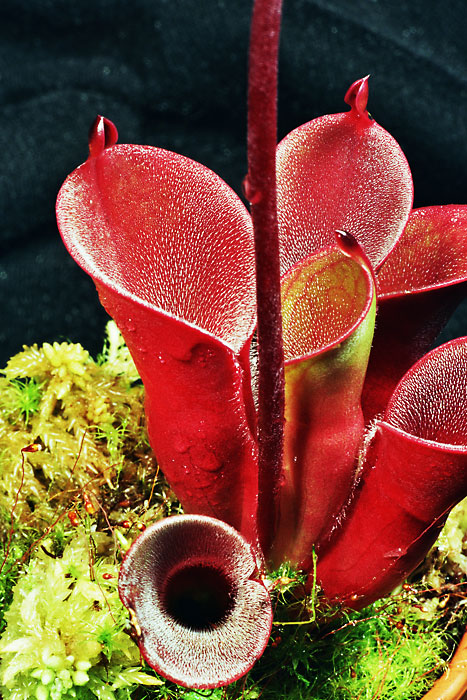

Scientific classification
- Kingdom: Plantae
- Clade: Tracheophytes
- Clade: Angiosperms
- Clade: Eudicots
- Clade: Asterids
- Order: Ericales
- Family: Sarraceniaceae
- Genus: Heliamphora
- Species: H. pulchella

Binomial name
- Heliamphora pulchella Wistuba, Carow, Harbarth & Nerz (2005)

= Heliamphora pulchella =

Species of carnivorous plant

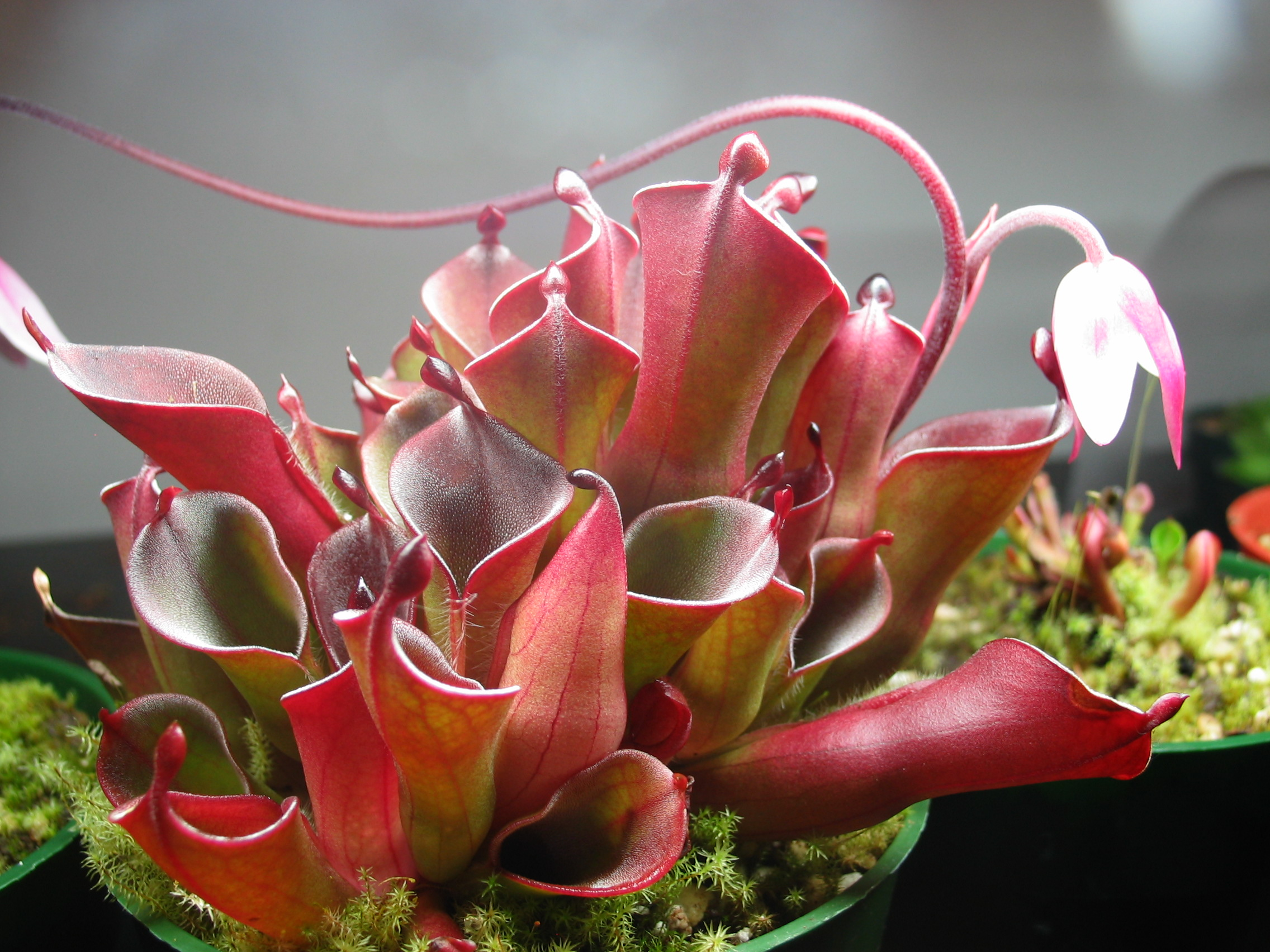
Heliamphora pulchella in cultivation.

Heliamphora pulchella (Latin: pulchellus = pretty) is a species of marsh pitcher plant endemic to the Chimanta Massif and surrounding tepuis in Venezuela. It is one of the smallest species and closely related to H. minor.

== Infraspecific taxa ==
Two major variants of H. pulchella are known: the type variety, which bears conspicuous retentive hairs on the inner pitcher surface, and an incompletely diagnosed taxon from Amurí Tepui, which lacks these hairs.
