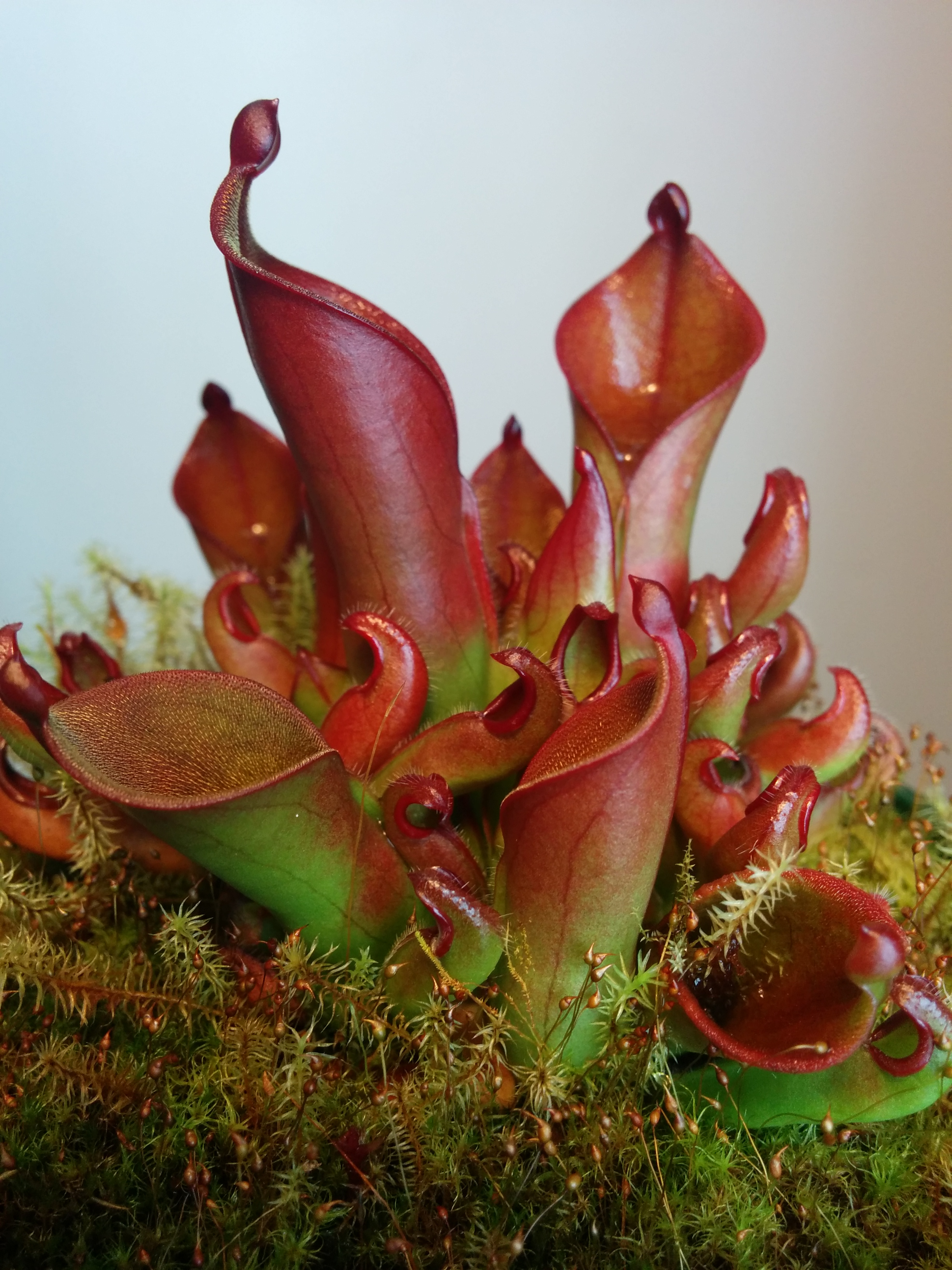
- Heliamphora hispida in cultivation.

Scientific classification
- Kingdom: Plantae
- Clade: Tracheophytes
- Clade: Angiosperms
- Clade: Eudicots
- Clade: Asterids
- Order: Ericales
- Family: Sarraceniaceae
- Genus: Heliamphora
- Species: H. hispida

Binomial name
- Heliamphora hispida Nerz & Wistuba (2000)

= Heliamphora hispida =

Species of carnivorous plant

Heliamphora hispida (Latin: hispidus = covered with stiff or rough hairs, bristly) is a species of Marsh Pitcher Plant endemic to Cerro Neblina, the southernmost tepui of the Guiana Highlands at the Brazil-Venezuela border.
