= Heliamphora sarracenioides =

Scientific classification
- Kingdom: Plantae
- Clade: Tracheophytes
- Clade: Angiosperms
- Clade: Eudicots
- Clade: Asterids
- Order: Ericales
- Family: Sarraceniaceae
- Genus: Heliamphora
- Species: H. sarracenioides

Binomial name
- Heliamphora sarracenioides Carow, Wistuba & Harbarth (2005)

Species of carnivorous plant

Heliamphora sarracenioides (Latin: Sarracenia = genus of North American pitcher plants, -oides = resembling) is a species of marsh pitcher plant endemic to Ptari Tepui in Bolívar state, Venezuela. Approximately 200 mature plants were observed in the type locality, however this site's true location and information regarding sympatric species has not been disclosed for conservation reasons. The species differentiates itself from others by the extremely wide pitcher lid, which resembles Sarracenia species. It is closest to H. heterodoxa and H. folliculata, from which it can be distinguished by the large lid glands and width of the pitcher lid.
