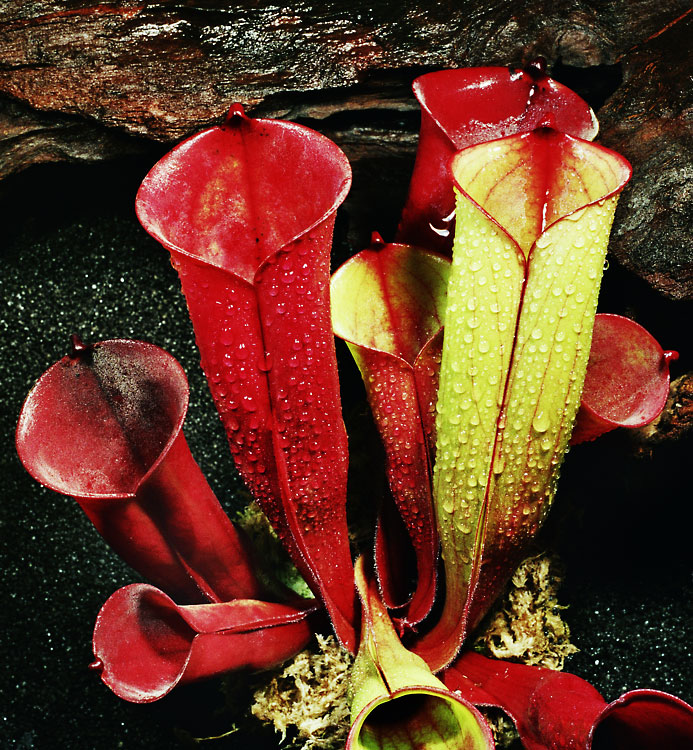

Scientific classification
- Kingdom: Plantae
- Clade: Tracheophytes
- Clade: Angiosperms
- Clade: Eudicots
- Clade: Asterids
- Order: Ericales
- Family: Sarraceniaceae
- Genus: Heliamphora
- Species: H. folliculata

Binomial name
- Heliamphora folliculata Wistuba, Harbarth & Carow (2001)

= Heliamphora folliculata =

Species of carnivorous plant

Heliamphora folliculata (Latin: folliculatus = having follicles) is a species of Marsh Pitcher Plant endemic to the Aparaman group of tepuis in Venezuela. It grows on all four mountains: Aparaman Tepui, Murosipan Tepui, Tereke Tepui and Kamakeiwaran Tepui.

The nectar spoon of this species, which bears giant extrafloral nectaries within its internal chamber, may have evolved to prevent rain from washing away the energetically costly nectar produced by the plant.
