= Heliamphora 'Red Mambo' =

Cultivar of carnivorous plant

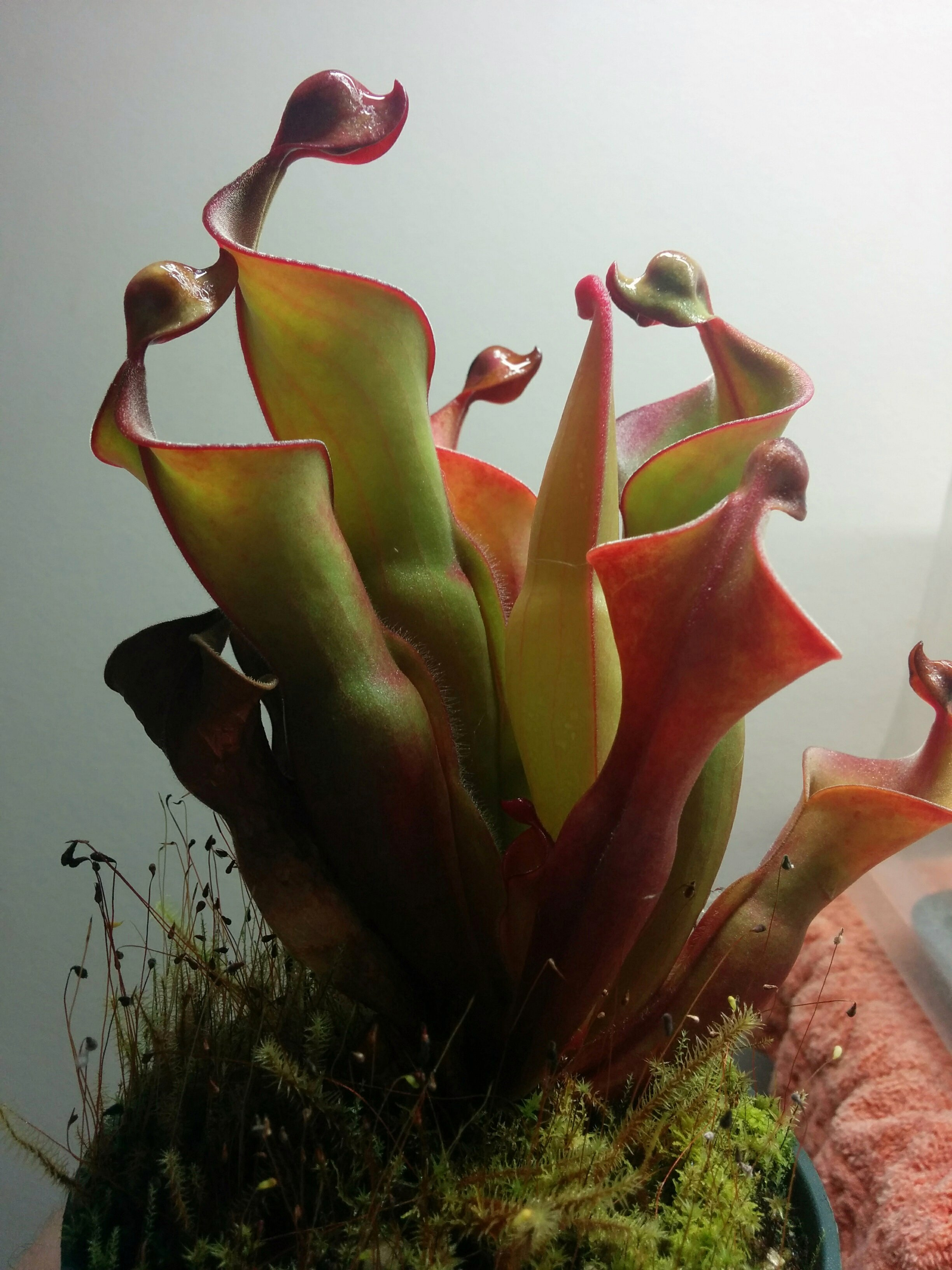
- Genus: Heliamphora
- Cultivar: 'Red Mambo'
- Origin: Canada

Heliamphora 'Red Mambo' is a cultivar of Heliamphora registered by Francois Boulianne from Canada.

This cultivar is very different from other Heliamphora; the nectar spoon is horned.

The origin of the plant is a total mystery. Heliamphora 'Red Mambo' was found in an old private collection in Montréal Canada, half dead. At that point, the plant was probably the only one in the world.
