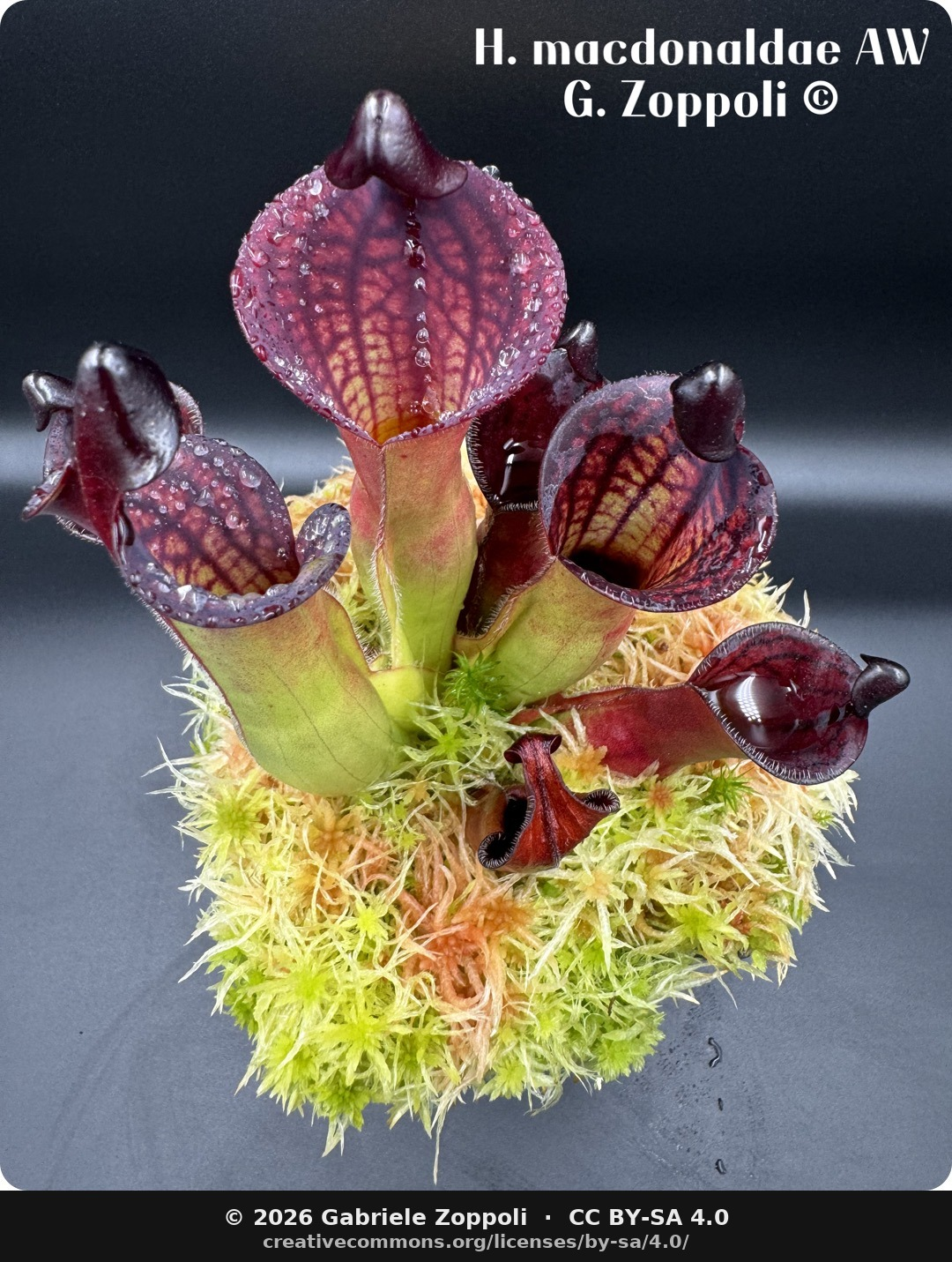
- Cultivated specimen of Heliamphora macdonaldae

Scientific classification
- Kingdom: Plantae
- Clade: Tracheophytes
- Clade: Angiosperms
- Clade: Eudicots
- Clade: Asterids
- Order: Ericales
- Family: Sarraceniaceae
- Genus: Heliamphora
- Species: H. macdonaldae

Binomial name
- Heliamphora macdonaldae Gleason (1931)

Synonyms
- Heliamphora tatei var. macdonaldae (Gleason) Maguire (1978); Heliamphora tatei f. macdonaldae (Gleason) Steyerm. (1984)

= Heliamphora macdonaldae =

Species of carnivorous plant

Heliamphora macdonaldae is a species of marsh pitcher plant endemic to Venezuela. It is closely related to H. tatei and was for a long time considered a form or variety of that species. Putative natural hybrids between H. macdonaldae and H. tatei have been recorded in the southern part of Cerro Duida.
