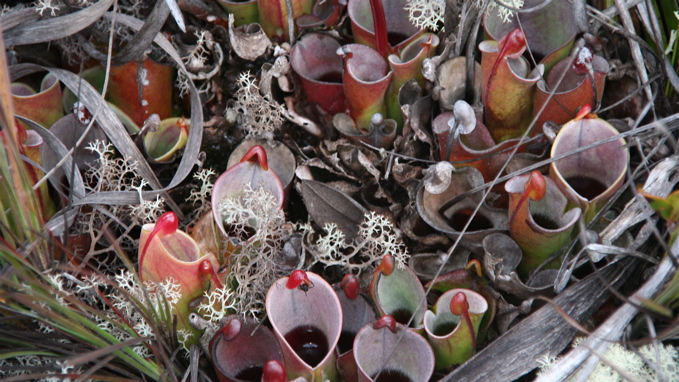
- Heliamphora minor growing on Auyán-tepui

Scientific classification
- Kingdom: Plantae
- Clade: Tracheophytes
- Clade: Angiosperms
- Clade: Eudicots
- Clade: Asterids
- Order: Ericales
- Family: Sarraceniaceae
- Genus: Heliamphora
- Species: H. minor

Binomial name
- Heliamphora minor Gleason (1939)
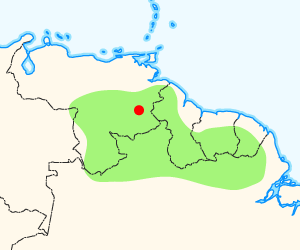
- Native range

Synonyms
- Heliamphora heterodoxa var. exappendiculata f. glabella Steyerm. (1984)

= Heliamphora minor =

Species of carnivorous plant

Heliamphora minor (Latin: minor = smaller) is a species of marsh pitcher plant endemic to Auyán-tepui in Venezuela. As the name suggests, it is one of the smallest species in the genus. It is closely related to H. ciliata and H. pulchella.

== Cultivation ==
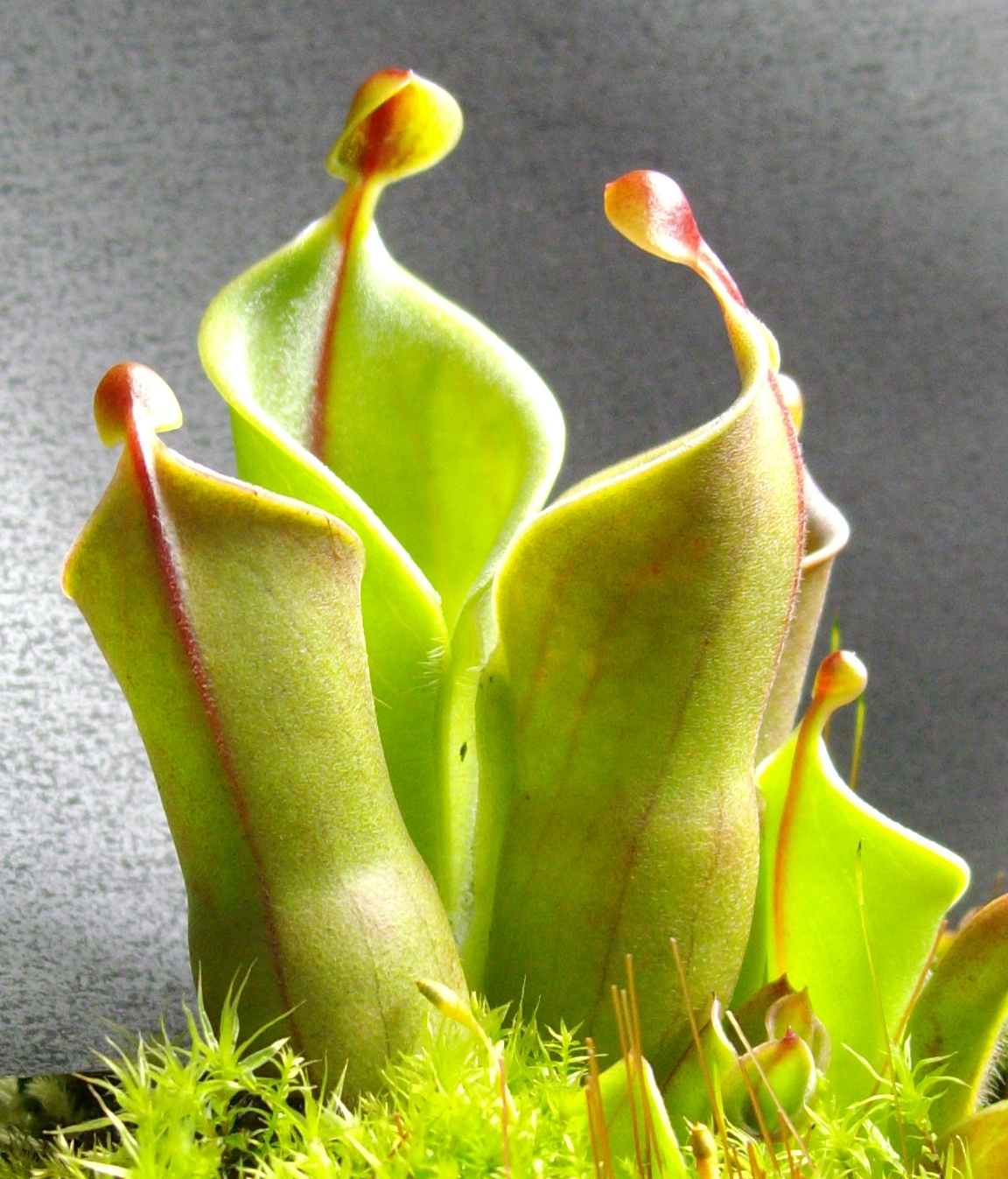
A cultivated specimen

Heliamphora minor is one of the more widely available species in the genus for cultivation. Typically, H. minor is grown under strong fluorescent lights in a terrarium, or in a greenhouse with partial sunlight. Like other carnivorous plants, H. minor requires water free from added minerals and chemicals. It can survive a wide range of temperatures, preferably around 70–90 °F, however during the night the temperature must drop to around 10 degrees less than the day temperature. Soil for H. minor must be low in nutrients. Combinations of washed sand, orchid bark, long fibered sphagnum moss (dried or living), peat moss, and perlite may be used. Heliamphora plants also require a high humidity level (70+%), which can be achieved in a greenhouse or terrarium.

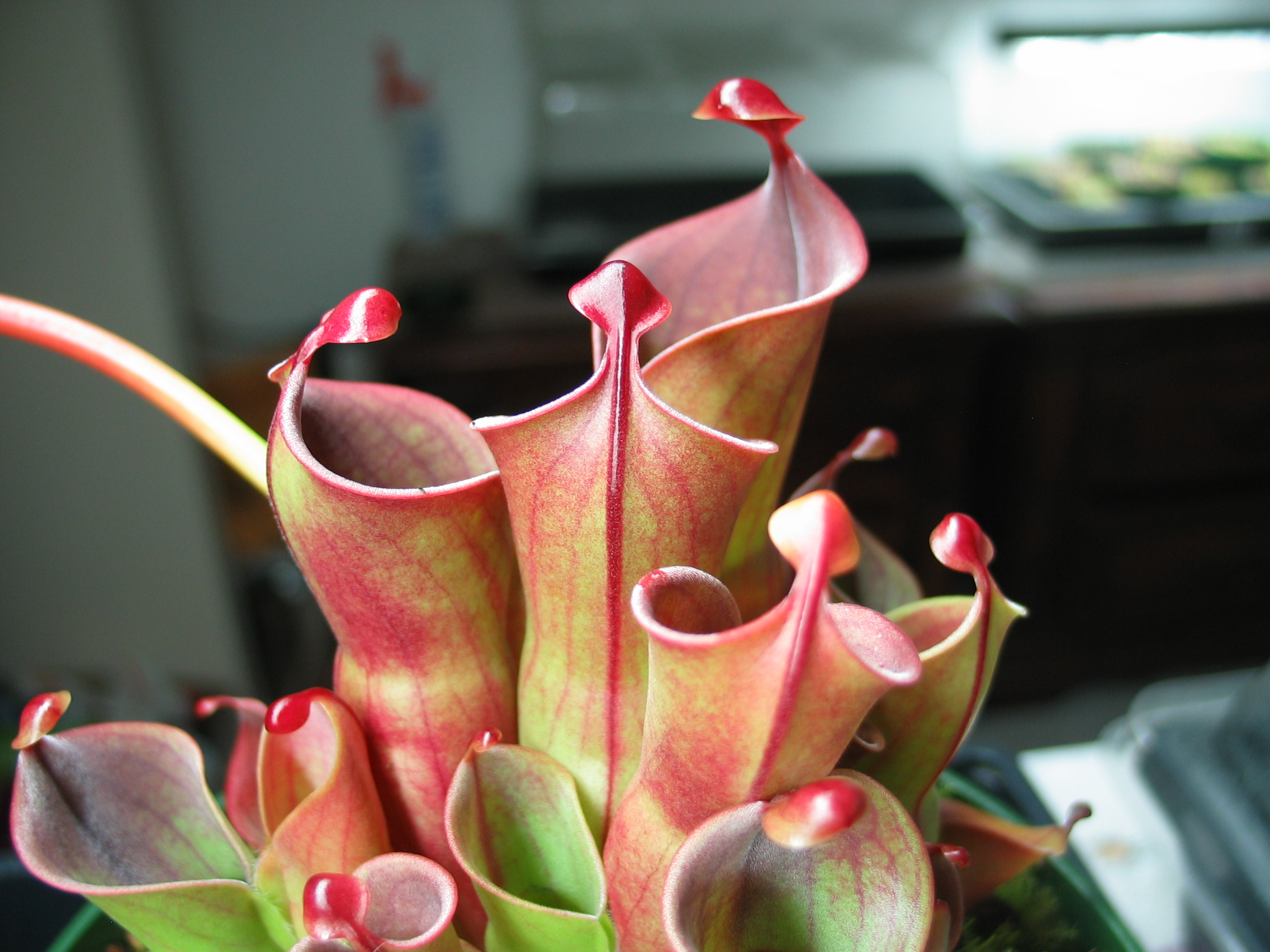
heliamphora minor var minor

== Infraspecific taxa ==
Two varieties of H. minor are recognised: the autonym H. minor var. minor and H. minor var. pilosa, which is characterised by conspicuous hairs on the pitcher exterior. The purpose of the exterior indumentum is unknown, but may assist in the scaling of otherwise glabrous exterior surfaces. Another hypothesis suggests that it may discourage terrestrial arthropods from scaling the pitcher and restrict access to the nectar spoon to flying insects, thus preventing the loss of nectar to insects that tend to steal nectar. Also, the highly reflective surface of the indumenta may make foliage more visible to flying insects with light-sensitive vision.

Distinguishing factors between H. pulchella and H. minor include nectar spoon morphology; the nectar spoons of pulchella emerge directly on the back rim of the pitcher in a small depression, while the spoon of minor emerges on a narrow stalk ending in a larger nectar spoon than that of pulchella.

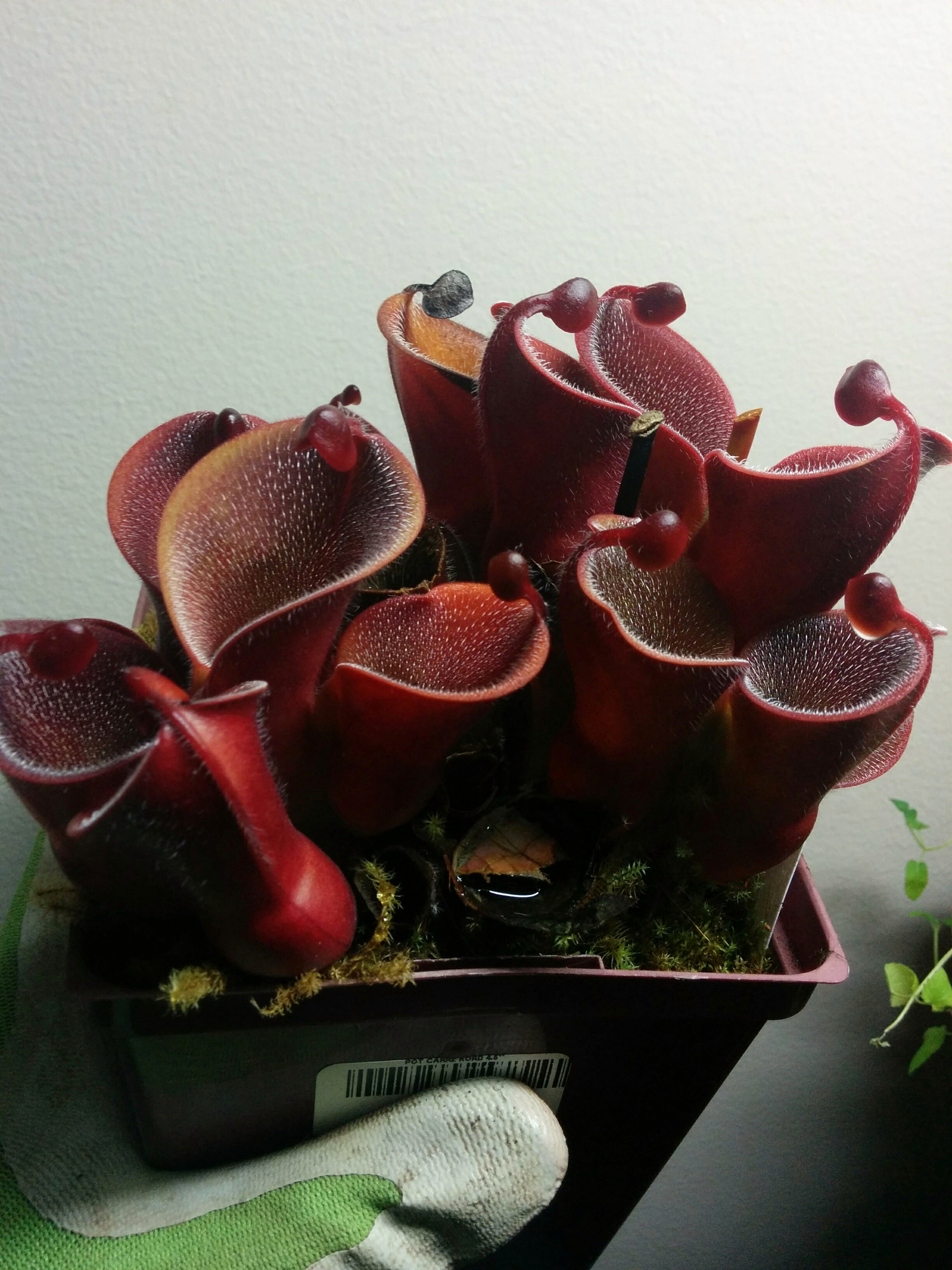
heliamphora minor var pilosa in cultivation.

Heliamphora minor f. laevis, described by Julian Alfred Steyermark in 1984, is considered a synonym of H. minor var. minor.
