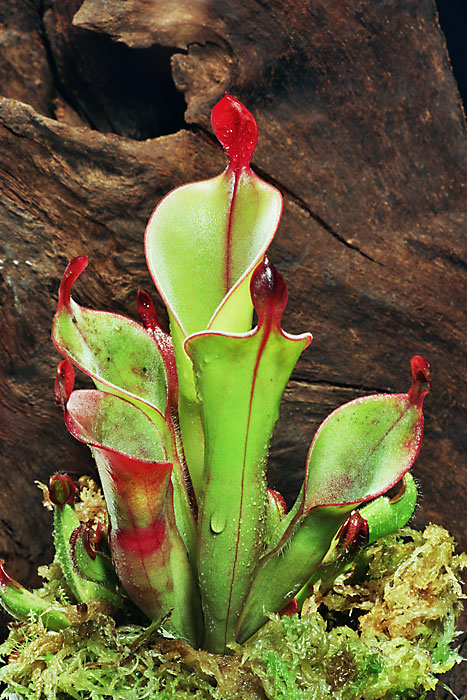

Scientific classification
- Kingdom: Plantae
- Clade: Tracheophytes
- Clade: Angiosperms
- Clade: Eudicots
- Clade: Asterids
- Order: Ericales
- Family: Sarraceniaceae
- Genus: Heliamphora
- Species: H. chimantensis

Binomial name
- Heliamphora chimantensis Wistuba, Carow & Harbarth (2002)

= Heliamphora chimantensis =

Species of carnivorous plant

Heliamphora chimantensis is a species of marsh pitcher plant endemic to the Chimantá Massif in Venezuela. It has been recorded from Apacará Tepui and Chimantá Tepui. The species is thought to be more closely related to Heliamphora tatei and Heliamphora neblinae than to other species found in the Gran Sabana region. Like other members of the genus Heliamphora, it survives in nutrient-poor environments by capturing and digesting insects using specialized pitcher-shaped leaves.

== Description ==
Heliamphora chimantensis is a carnivorous plant characterized by hollow, pitcher-shaped leaves that function as insect traps. These pitchers collect rainwater and attract prey, which falls into the fluid-filled cavity and becomes trapped. The plant absorbs nutrients released from decomposing insects, allowing it to survive in nutrient-poor tepui soils.

All other species in the Gran Sabana region typically have between 10 and 15 anthers, whereas H. tatei, H. neblinae, and H. chimantensis have approximately 20. However, the anthers of H. tatei and H. neblinae measure 7–9 mm in length, while those of H. chimantensis are shorter, reaching only about 5 mm. These morphological differences help distinguish the species from other members of the genus.

== Habitat and distribution ==
Heliamphora chimantensis is native to the Chimantá Massif in southeastern Venezuela and has been documented on Apacará Tepui and Chimantá Tepui. These formations are part of the Guiana Highlands, an isolated high-elevation region known for its biodiversity.

The species grows in humid environments with frequent rainfall and extremely nutrient-poor soils. In such conditions, carnivory provides a key advantage by supplying nitrogen and other essential nutrients through captured prey.

== Cultivation ==
Because Heliamphora chimantensis grows naturally in humid tepui environments, successful cultivation requires specialized conditions. These include high humidity, bright light, and relatively cool temperatures that mimic its natural habitat. Due to these requirements, the species is typically grown only by experienced carnivorous plant enthusiasts and botanical institutions.
