= Heliamphora elongata =

Scientific classification
- Kingdom: Plantae
- Clade: Tracheophytes
- Clade: Angiosperms
- Clade: Eudicots
- Clade: Asterids
- Order: Ericales
- Family: Sarraceniaceae
- Genus: Heliamphora
- Species: H. elongata

Binomial name
- Heliamphora elongata Nerz (2004)

Species of carnivorous plant

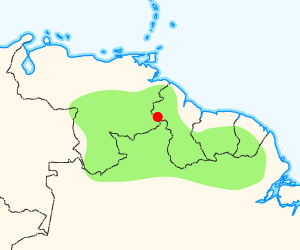
A map showing where Heliamphora elongata can be found

Heliamphora elongata (Latin: elongare = elongated) is a species of marsh pitcher plant endemic to the Ilu–Tramen Massif in Venezuela.
