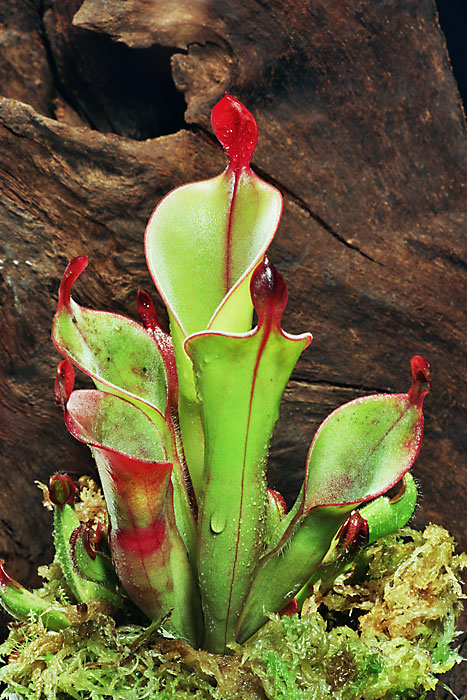
- Heliamphora chimantensis

Scientific classification
- Kingdom: Plantae
- Clade: Tracheophytes
- Clade: Angiosperms
- Clade: Eudicots
- Clade: Asterids
- Order: Ericales
- Family: Sarraceniaceae
- Genus: Heliamphora; Benth. (1840)
- Heliamphora distribution

= Heliamphora =

Genus of carnivorous plants

The genus Heliamphora (/hɛliˈæmfərə/ or /hiːliˈæmfərə/; Greek: helos "marsh" and amphoreus "amphora") contains 24 species of pitcher plants endemic to South America. The species are collectively known as sun pitchers, based on the mistaken notion that the heli of Heliamphora is from the Greek helios, meaning "sun". The name instead derives from the Greek helos, meaning "marsh", so a more accurate translation of their scientific name would be marsh pitcher plants. Species in the genus Heliamphora are carnivorous plants that consist of a modified leaf form that is fused into a tubular shape. They have evolved mechanisms to attract, trap, and kill insects; and control the amount of water in the pitcher. At least one species (H. tatei) produces its own proteolytic enzymes that allows it to digest its prey without the help of symbiotic bacteria.

== Morphology ==
All Heliamphora species are herbaceous perennial plants that grow from a subterranean rhizome. Heliamphora species form stemless rosettes and leaf height ranges from a few centimeters (H. minor, H. pulchella) up to more than 50 cm (20 in) (H. ionasi, H. tatei). Heliamphora possess tubular traps formed by rolled leaves with fused edges. Marsh pitcher plants are unusual among pitcher plants in that they lack lids (opercula), instead having a small "nectar spoon" on the upper posterior portion of the leaf. This spoon-like structure secretes a nectar-like substance, which serves as a lure for insects and small animals. Each pitcher also exhibits a small drainage hole (W, E2a, E2b, and E3 Clades) or slit (E1 Clade) in its side that allows excess rainwater to drain away, similar to the overflow on a sink. It was inferred that the drainage structure first evolved as drainage hole in ancestral Heliamphora populations and further modified into drainage slit in the ancestors of E1 clade. This allows the marsh pitcher plants to maintain a constant maximum level of rainwater within the pitcher. The pitchers' inner surface is covered with downward-pointing hairs to force insects into the pitchers' lower parts. The morphological diversification of Heliamphora pitchers is both convergent and divergent, likely as a result of adaptive radiation in the geographically complex Guiana highland.

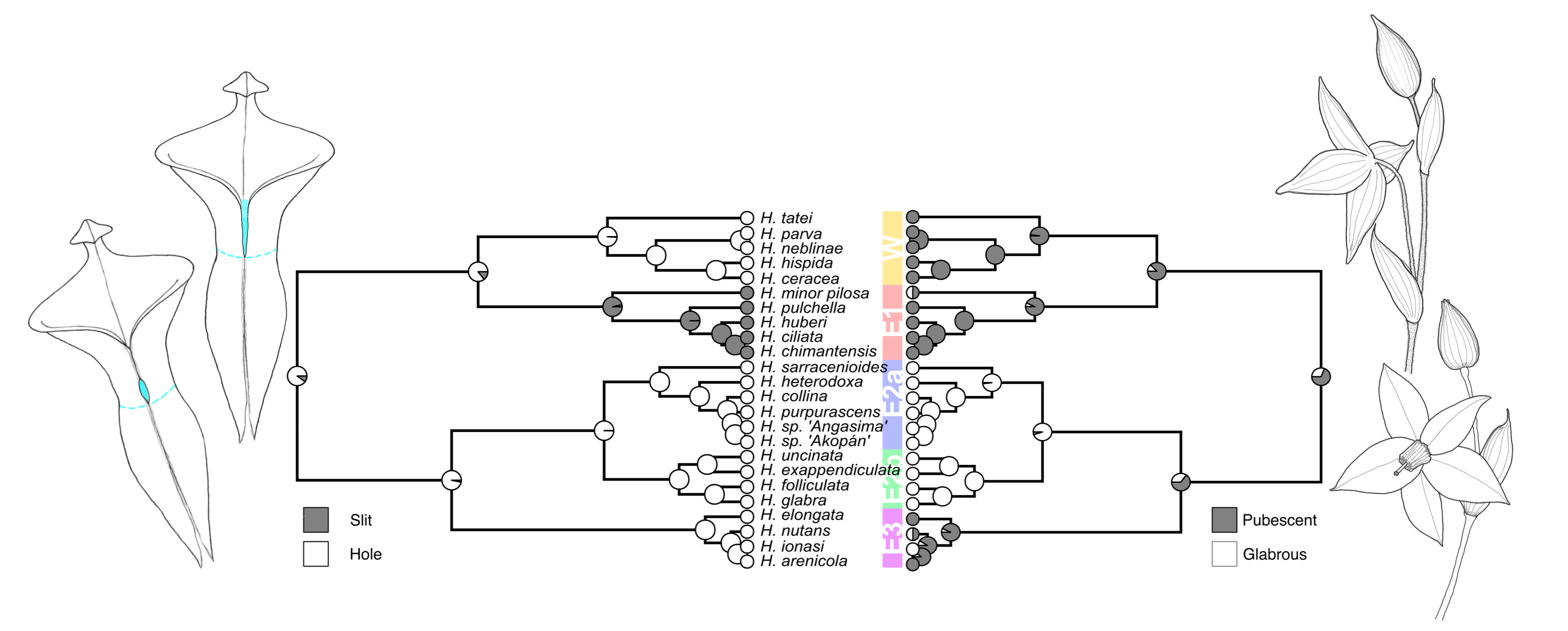
Phylogeny of Heliamphora inferred from nuclear DNA and the evolution of morphological characters. The drainage slit is only found in the E1 clade. In the rest of Heliamphora, the drainage hole is present. The study suggested that the drainage hole is the ancestral state in Heliamphora and was further modified into drainage slit in the E1 clade.

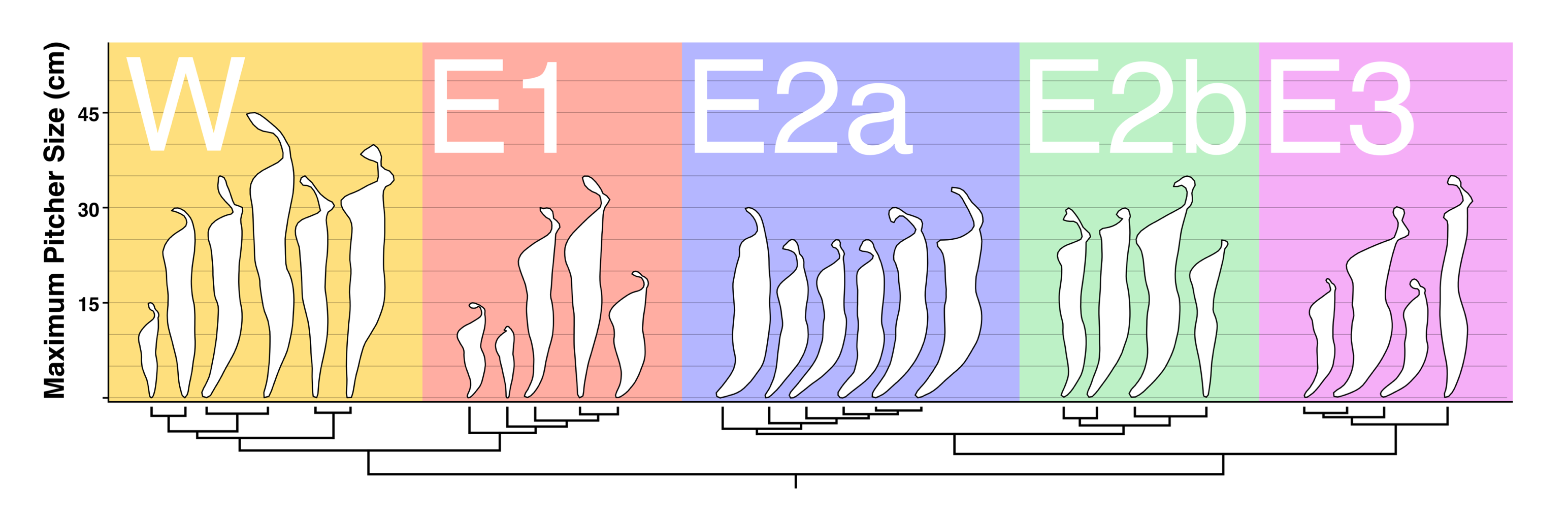
Adaptive Radiation of Heliamphora Pitchers

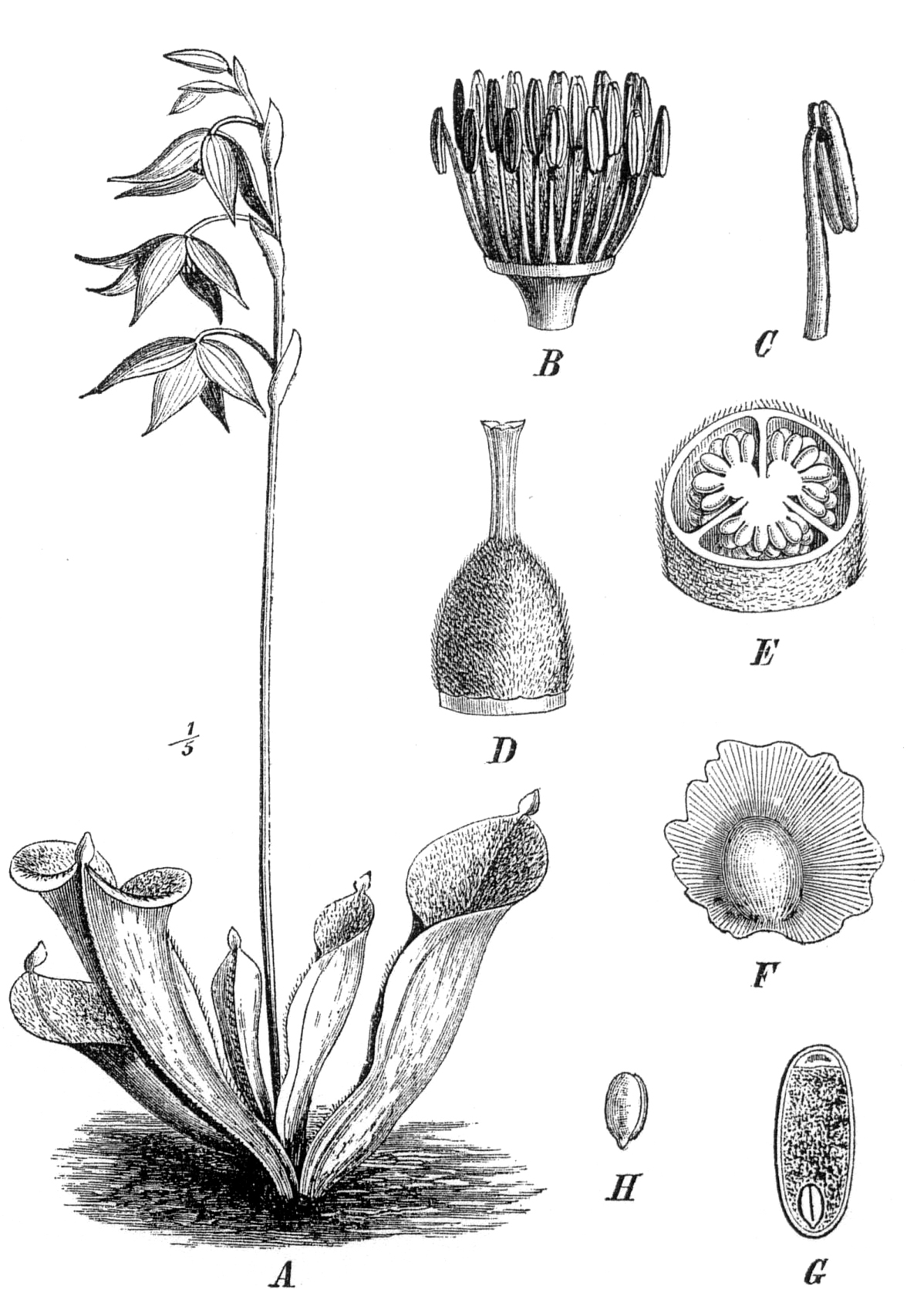
Illustration of Heliamphora nutans from John Muirhead Macfarlane's 1908 monograph on the genus (A: entire plant; B: androecium; C: stamen; D: pistil; E: transverse section of the ovary; F: seed, with the testa; G: vertical section of the seed; H: embryo)

=== Carnivory ===
Though often counted among the various carnivorous plants, with the exception of Heliamphora tatei, the vast majority of plants in the genus Heliamphora do not produce their own digestive enzymes (i.e. proteases, ribonucleases, phosphatases, etc.), relying instead on the enzymes of symbiotic bacteria to break down their prey. They do, however, attract prey through special visual and chemical signals and trap and kill the prey through a typical pitfall trap. Field studies of H. nutans, H. heterodoxa, H. minor, and H. ionasi have determined that none of these species produce their own proteolytic enzymes. H. tatei is one of the few species observed to produce both digestive enzymes and wax scales, which also aid in prey capture. The pattern of carnivory among Heliamphora species, combined with habitat data, indicates that carnivory in this genus evolved in nutrient-poor locations as a means to improve absorption of available nutrients. Most Heliamphora typically capture ants, while H. tatei can capture and absorb nutrients from more flying insects. The carnivorous habit among these species is lost in low light conditions, which suggests that certain nutrient concentrations (specifically nitrogen and phosphorus) are only limiting during periods of fast growth under normal light conditions, thus rendering most of the carnivorous adaptations inefficient and not energy cost effective.

In H. tatei, tissue-specific transcriptomic analyses have identified a suite of genes that are highly expressed in the nectar-spoon — the specialized structure at the top of the pitcher that secretes sugary nectar and emits scent compounds to lure insects. Among these, a lineage of SWEET sugar transporters is up-regulated and appears to be evolving rapidly, consistent with specialization for nectar production. In addition, genes associated with volatile organic compound synthesis — many of which are also known from floral scent pathways — are active in the nectar spoon, suggesting a genetic basis for scent-mediated prey attraction. These findings indicate that ancient, conserved plant genes have been repurposed during the evolution of H. tatei carnivory to facilitate the production of both nectar rewards and attractive scents, enhancing prey visitation. This molecular recruitment underscores that prey attraction in Heliamphora is not solely a morphological or ecological trait but also involves distinct genetic adaptations in H. tatei.

== Distribution ==
All Heliamphora species are endemic to the tepuis of the Guiana Highlands and their surrounding uplands. Most are found in Venezuela, with a few extending into western Guyana and northern Brazil. Many of the tepuis have not yet been explored for Heliamphora, and the large number of species described in recent years suggests that many more species may be awaiting discovery.

== Botanical history ==
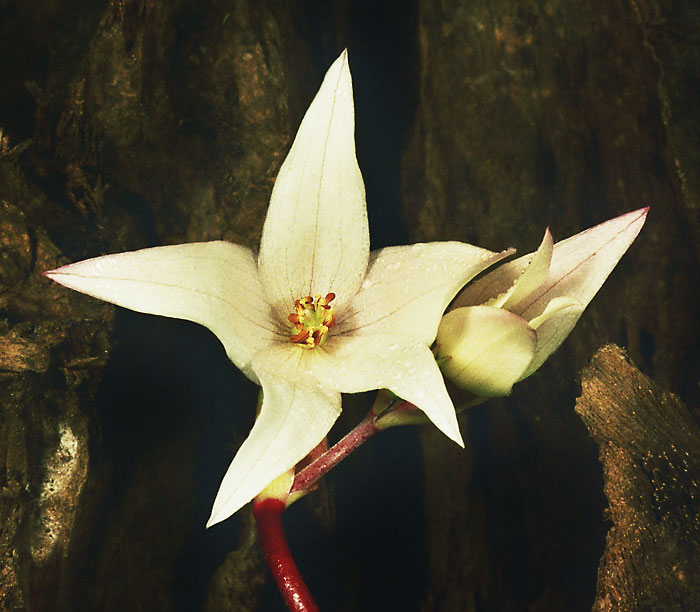
Flowers of H. pulchella

The first species of the genus to be described was H. nutans, which George Bentham named in 1840 based on a specimen collected by Robert Hermann Schomburgk. This remained the only known species until Henry Allan Gleason described H. tatei and H. tyleri in 1931, also adding H. minor in 1939. Between 1978 and 1984, Julian Alfred Steyermark and Bassett Maguire revised the genus (to which Steyermark had added H. heterodoxa in 1951) and described two more species, H. ionasi and H. neblinae, as well as many infraspecific taxa. Various exploratory expeditions as well as review of existing herbarium specimens has yielded many new species in recent years, mainly through the work of a group of German horticulturalists and botanists (Thomas Carow, Peter Harbarth, Joachim Nerz and Andreas Wistuba).

== Care in cultivation ==
Heliamphora are regarded by carnivorous plant enthusiasts and experts as one of the more difficult plants to maintain in cultivation. The genus requires cool (the "highland" species) to warm (the "lowland" species) temperatures with a constant and very high humidity. An amateur botanist in New York City has shown that cultivation of the genus can be achieved with an inexpensive setup consisting of a large plastic crate, a fan, egg cartons, and water bottles filled with ice. The highland species, which originate from high on the humid tepui mountaintops, include H. nutans, H. ionasi, and H. tatei. The lowland Heliamphora, such as H. ciliata and H. heterodoxa have migrated to the warmer grasslands at the foot of the tepuis.

Shredded, long-fibered, or live sphagnum moss is preferred as a soil substrate, often with added horticultural lava rock, perlite, and pumice. The substrate must always be kept moist and extremely well drained. Misting Heliamphora with purified water is often beneficial to maintain high humidity levels.

Propagation through division only has a limited rate of success, as many plants that are divided go into shock and eventually die. Germination of Heliamphora seed is achieved by scattering it on milled sphagnum moss and keeping in bright light and humid conditions. Seed germination begins after many weeks.

== Classification ==
The genus Heliamphora contains the most species in the Sarraceniaceae family and is joined by the cobra lily (Darlingtonia californica) and the North American pitcher plants (Sarracenia spp.) in that taxon.

=== Species ===
Twenty-four species of Heliamphora are currently recognized. Unless otherwise stated, all information and taxonomic determinations in the table below are sourced from the 2011 work Sarraceniaceae of South America authored by Stewart McPherson, Andreas Wistuba, Andreas Fleischmann, and Joachim Nerz. Authorities are presented in the form of a standard author citation, using abbreviations specified by the IPNI. Years given denote the year of the species's formal publication under the current name, not the earlier basionym date of publication if one exists.

Species	Authority	Year	Image	Distribution	Altitudinal distribution
Heliamphora arenicola	Wistuba, A.Fleischm., Nerz & S.McPherson	2011		Venezuela	Below 2000 m
Heliamphora ceracea	Nerz, Wistuba, Grantsau, Rivadavia, A.Fleischm. & S.McPherson	2011		Brazil	Highland
Heliamphora chimantensis	Wistuba, Carow & Harbarth	2002		Venezuela	1900–2100 m
Heliamphora ciliata	Wistuba, Nerz & A.Fleischm.	2009		Venezuela	900 m
Heliamphora collina	Wistuba, Nerz, S.McPherson & A.Fleischm.	2011		Venezuela	1700–1825 m
Heliamphora elongata	Nerz	2004		Venezuela	1800–2600 m
Heliamphora exappendiculata	(Maguire & Steyermark) Nerz & Wistuba	2006		Venezuela	1700–2100 m
Heliamphora folliculata	Wistuba, Harbarth & Carow	2001		Venezuela	1700–2400 m
Heliamphora glabra	(Maguire) Nerz, Wistuba & Hoogenstrijd	2006		Borderlands of Brazil, Guyana, and Venezuela	1200–2750 m
Heliamphora heterodoxa	Steyerm.	1951		Guyana?, Venezuela	1200–2200 m
Heliamphora hispida	Nerz & Wistuba	2000		Border between Brazil and Venezuela	1800–3014 m
Heliamphora huberi	A.Fleischm., Wistuba & Nerz	2009		Venezuela	1850–2200 m
Heliamphora ionasi	Maguire	1978		Venezuela	1800–2600 m
Heliamphora macdonaldae	Gleason	1931		Venezuela	1500–2300 m
Heliamphora minor	Gleason	1939		Venezuela	1650–2500 m
Heliamphora neblinae	Maguire	1978		Border between Brazil and Venezuela	860–2200 m
Heliamphora nutans	Benth.	1840		Borderlands of Brazil, Guyana, and Venezuela	2000–2700 m
Heliamphora parva	(Maguire) S.McPherson, A.Fleischm., Wistuba & Nerz	2011		Venezuela	1750–2200 m
Heliamphora pulchella	Wistuba, Carow, Harbarth & Nerz	2005		Venezuela	1850–2550 m
Heliamphora purpurascens	Wistuba, A.Fleischm., Nerz & S.McPherson	2011		Venezuela	2400–2500 m
Heliamphora sarracenioides	Carow, Wistuba & Harbarth	2005		Venezuela	2400–2450 m
Heliamphora tatei	Gleason	1931		Venezuela	1700–2400 m
Heliamphora uncinata	Nerz, Wistuba & A.Fleischm.	2009		Venezuela	1850 m

=== Incompletely diagnosed taxa ===
A further two incompletely diagnosed taxa are known that may represent distinct species in their own right.

Species	Distribution	Altitudinal distribution
Heliamphora sp. 'Akopán Tepui'	Venezuela	1800–1900 m
Heliamphora sp. 'Angasima Tepui'	Venezuela	2200–2250 m

=== Varieties ===
Two varieties are currently recognised in the genus: H. minor var. pilosa and H. minor var. minor. Additionally, an undescribed variant of H. pulchella, with traps lacking long retentive hairs is known from Amurí Tepui.

=== Cultivars ===
There are currently four registered Heliamphora cultivars including Heliamphora 'Cyclops' (A. Smith), Heliamphora 'Patasola' (B. Tincher & J. Lei), Heliamphora 'Red Mambo' (F. Boulianne), and Heliamphora 'Scylla' (I. Bogdanow).

== Natural hybrids ==
At least eleven natural hybrids have been recorded:

- H. arenicola × H. ionasi
- H. ceracea × H. hispida
- H. chimantensis × H. pulchella
- H. elongata × H. ionasi
- H. exappendiculata × H. huberi
- H. exappendiculata × H. pulchella
- H. glabra × H. nutans
- H. huberi × H. pulchella
- H. neblinae × H. parva
- H. purpurascens × H. sarracenioides
- H. sp. 'Akopán Tepui' × H. pulchella

Additionally, putative complex hybrids occur on the Neblina Massif among populations of H. ceracea, H. hispida, H. neblinae, and H. parva. Putative crosses between H. macdonaldae and H. tatei have also been recorded in the southern part of Cerro Duida.

== Phylogeny and Diversification ==
Closely related species tend to be geographically closely distributed. Major Heliamphora clades probably emerged through both geographical separation and dispersal in the Guiana Highlands during Miocene with more recent diversification driven by vertical displacement during the Pleistocene glacial-interglacial thermal oscillations.

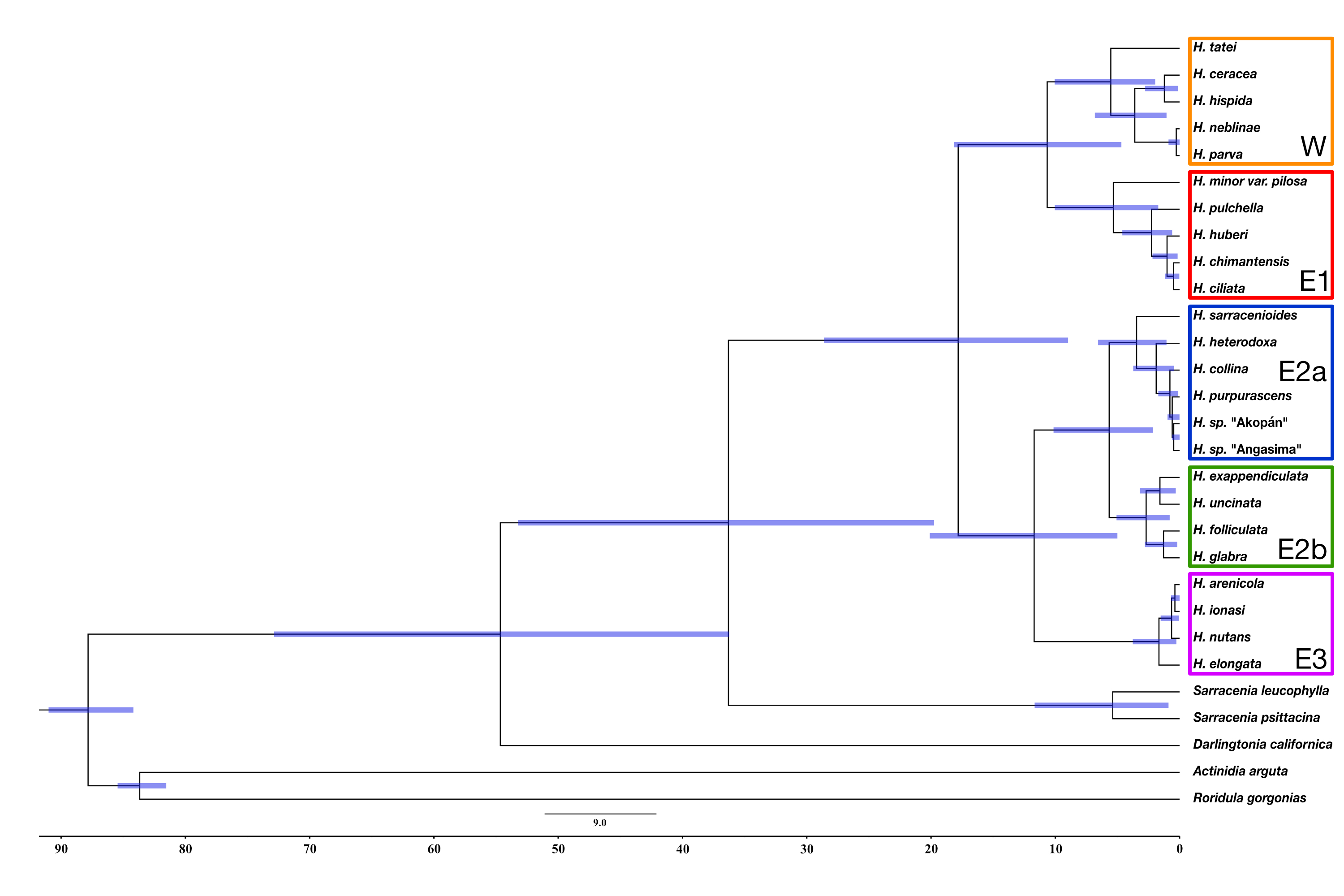
Evolutionary History of Heliamphora inferred from nuclear DNA. The evolutionary time is represented in millions of years. The node bars represent uncertainty in ancestral age estimations.
