= Das Taublatt =

- Volume 53, issue 3 (2005)
- Discipline: Botany
- Language: German
- Edited by: Carsten Paul

Publication details
- History: 1984–present
- Publisher: Gesellschaft für Fleischfressende Pflanzen (Germany)
- Frequency: Biannual

Standard abbreviations
- ISO 4: Taublatt

Indexing
- ISSN: 0942-959X
- OCLC no.: 85159943

Links
- Journal homepage

Das Taublatt is a twice-yearly German-language periodical based in Bochum and the official publication of Gesellschaft für Fleischfressende Pflanzen, a carnivorous plant society based in Germany. Typical articles include matters of horticultural interest, field reports, and new taxon descriptions. The journal was established in 1984. It publishes in full colour on glossy paper, with each issue numbering around 52 pages.

== Taxon descriptions ==
Das Taublatt published the formal descriptions of Heliamphora glabra, Heliamphora pulchella, Nepenthes mantalingajanensis, and Nepenthes viridis, as well as the ant plant Hydnophytum caminiferum. It also originated the varietal name Pinguicula ehlersiae var. albiflora, which is a nomen nudum. Three Venus Flytrap cultivar names were first published in the journal: Dionaea muscipula 'Green Dragon', Dionaea muscipula 'Holland Red', and Dionaea muscipula 'Red Burgundy'.
