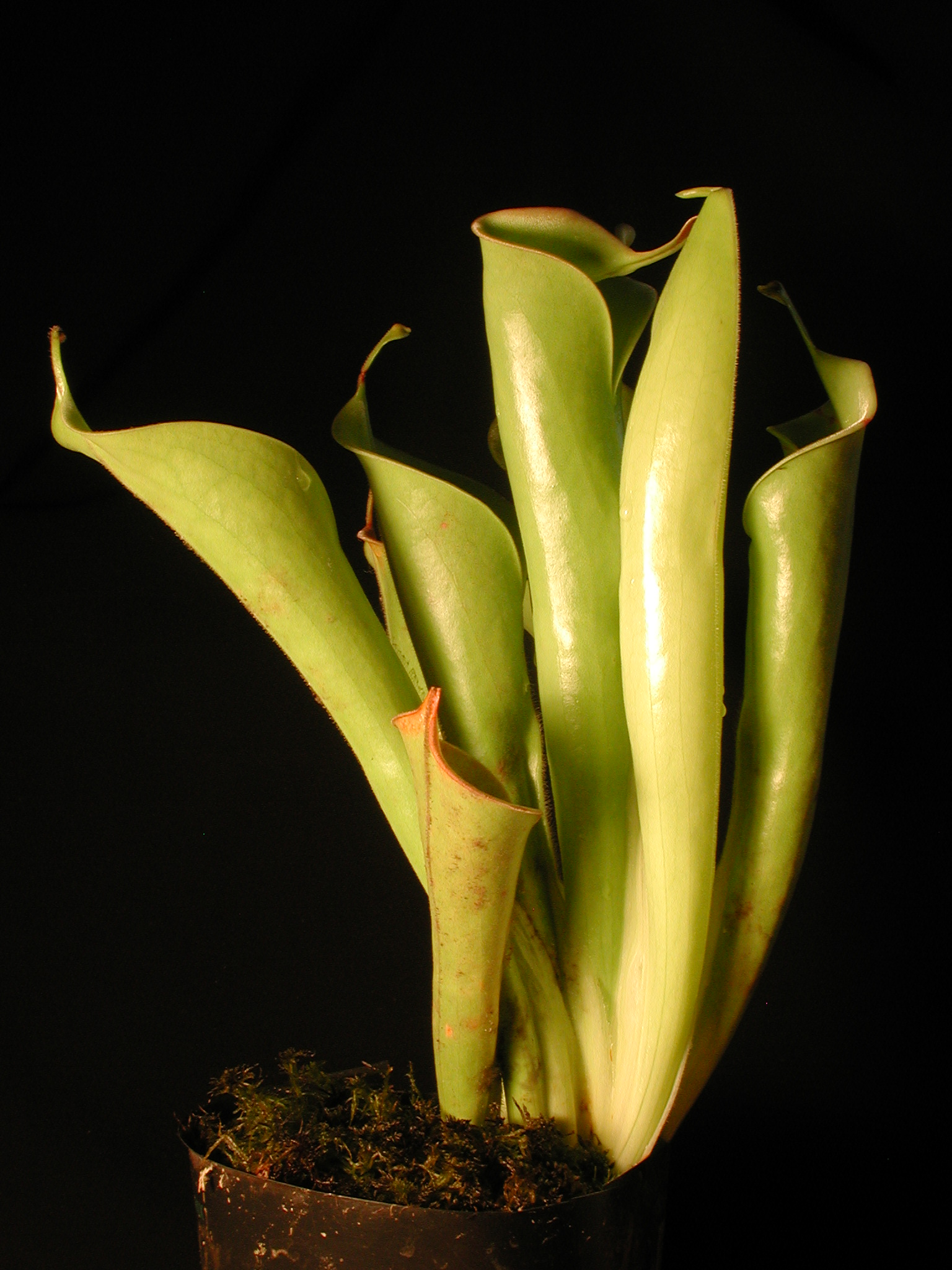

Scientific classification
- Kingdom: Plantae
- Clade: Tracheophytes
- Clade: Angiosperms
- Clade: Eudicots
- Clade: Asterids
- Order: Ericales
- Family: Sarraceniaceae
- Genus: Heliamphora
- Species: H. tatei

Binomial name
- Heliamphora tatei Gleason (1931)

Synonyms
- Heliamphora tyleri Gleason (1931)

= Heliamphora tatei =

Species of carnivorous plant

Heliamphora tatei (after George Henry Hamilton Tate) is a species of marsh pitcher plant endemic to Cerro Duida, Cerro Huachamacari and Cerro Marahuaca in Venezuela. It is closely related to H. macdonaldae, H. neblinae, and H. parva, and all three have in the past been considered forms or varieties of H. tatei. Like H. tatei, these species are noted for their stem-forming growth habit.

Putative natural hybrids between H. macdonaldae and H. tatei have been recorded in the southern part of Cerro Duida.

== Infraspecific taxa ==
- Heliamphora tatei var. macdonaldae (Gleason) Maguire (1978) [=H. macdonaldae]
- Heliamphora tatei f. macdonaldae (Gleason) Steyerm. (1984) [=H. macdonaldae]
- Heliamphora tatei var. neblinae (Maguire) Steyerm. (1984) [=H. neblinae]
- Heliamphora tatei var. neblinae f. parva (Maguire) Steyerm. (1984) [=H. parva]
- Heliamphora tatei f. tyleri (Gleason) Baumgartl (1993)
