= Joachim Nerz =

German botanist (born 1964)

Dr. Joachim Nerz (born 1964) is a German taxonomist and botanist specialising in the carnivorous plant genera Heliamphora and Nepenthes. Nerz has described several new species, mostly with Andreas Wistuba.

== Publications ==
- Schlauer, J. & J. Nerz 1994. Notes on Nepenthes (Nepenthaceae). I. Contributions to the Flora of Sumatra. Blumea 39: 139–142.
- Nerz, J. & A. Wistuba 1994. Five new taxa of Nepenthes (Nepenthaceae) from North and West Sumatra. Carnivorous Plant Newsletter 23(4): 101–114.
- Nerz, J., P. Mann, T. Alt & T. Smith 1998. Nepenthes sibuyanensis, a new Nepenthes from Sibuyan, a remote island of the Philippines. Carnivorous Plant Newsletter 27(1): 18–23.
- Nerz, J. 1998. Rediscovery of an outstanding Nepenthes: N. aristolochioides (Nepenthaceae). Carnivorous Plant Newsletter 27(3): 101–114.
- Nerz, J. & A. Wistuba 2000. Heliamphora hispida (Sarraceniaceae), a new species from Cerro Neblina, Brazil-Venezuela. Carnivorous Plant Newsletter 29(2): 37–41.
- Thiv, M. & J. Nerz 2000. Saccifolium, oder die bemerkenswerte Geschichte einer der seltensten Tepui-Pflanzen. Der Palmengarten 64(1): 11–16.
- Nerz, J. 2004. Heliamphora elongata (Sarraceniaceae), a new species from Ilu-Tepui. Carnivorous Plant Newsletter 33(4): 111–116.
- Wistuba, A., T. Carow, P. Harbarth & J. Nerz 2005. Heliamphora pulchella, eine neue mit Heliamphora minor (Sarraceniaceae) verwandte Art aus der Chimanta Region in Venezuela. Das Taublatt 53(3): 42–50.
- Nerz, J. & A. Wistuba 2006. Heliamphora exappendiculata, a clearly distinct species with unique characteristics. Carnivorous Plant Newsletter 35(2): 43–51.
- Nerz, J., A. Wistuba & G. Hoogenstrijd 2006. Heliamphora glabra (Sarraceniaceae), eine eindrucksvolle Heliamphora Art aus dem westlichen Teil des Guayana Schildes. Das Taublatt 54: 58–70.
- Wistuba, A., J. Nerz & A. Fleischmann 2007. Nepenthes flava, a new species of Nepenthaceae from the northern part of Sumatra. Blumea 52: 159–163.
- Nerz, J. & A. Wistuba 2007. Nepenthes mantalingajanensis (Nepenthaceae), eine bemerkenswerte neue Spezies aus Palawan (Philippinen). Das Taublatt 55(3): 17–25.
- Fleischmann, A., A. Wistuba & J. Nerz. 2009. Three new species of Heliamphora (Sarraceniaceae) from the Guayana Highlands of Venezuela. Willdenowia 39(2): 273–283. doi:10.3372/wi.39.39206
