= Andreas Fleischmann =

German botanist

- Born: 1980
- Occupation: botanist
- Known for: Research into carnivorous plants
- Scientific career
- Author abbrev. (botany): A.Fleischm.

Andreas Fleischmann (born 1980) is a German botanist specialising in carnivorous plants, particularly Droseraceae and Lentibulariaceae. He has (co-)published at least 46 new taxa including 14 species of Drosera (sundews), 7 species of Genlisea (corkscrew plants), 8 species of Heliamphora (marsh pitcher plants) and 3 species of Pinguicula (butterworts).

Fleischmann is curator of vascular plants at the Botanische Staatssammlung München (Bavarian State Collection for Botany).

== Awards ==
In 2016, the Société de physique et d'histoire naturelle de Genève made a special award of the Augustin-Pyramus de Candolle Prize to Fleischmann for scientific and botanical illustration in his Monograph of the genus Genlisea.

Fleischmann was awarded the Bavarian State Medal for Outstanding Services to the Environment in September 2022 in recognition of his contributions to science communication, conservation policy and voluntary initiatives such as the Flora of Bavaria. The medal is the highest environmental award bestowed by the Free State of Bavaria.

== Selected works ==
- Fleischmann, A. (2012). Monograph of the Genus Genlisea. Redfern Natural History Productions, Poole. ISBN 978-190-878-700-2.
- Meierott, L., Fleischmann, A., Ruff, M., Lippert, W. (eds.) (2024). Flora von Bayern. Haupt Verlag, Bern. ISBN 978-3258083599
- Fleischmann A., Schlauer J., Smith S.A. & Givnish T.J. (2018): Evolution of carnivory in angiosperms. In: Ellison A.M. & Adamec L. (eds.): Carnivorous plants: physiology, ecology, and evolution. Oxford University Press, 22 – 42.
- Fleischmann A., Cross A.T., Gibson R., Gonella P.M. & Dixon K.W. (2018): Systematics and evolution of Droseraceae. In: Ellison A.M. & Adamec L. (eds.): Carnivorous plants: physiology, ecology, and evolution. Oxford University Press, 45 – 57.
- Fleischmann A. & Roccia A. (2018): Systematics and evolution of Lentibulariaceae: I. Pinguicula. In: Ellison A.M. & Adamec L. (eds.): Carnivorous plants: physiology, ecology, and evolution. Oxford University Press, 70 – 80.
