= Andreas Wistuba =

German botanist (born 1967)

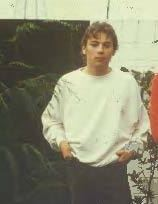
Wistuba as a teenager in Mannheim, Germany

Andreas Wistuba (born 4 March 1967) is a German taxonomist and botanist specialising in the carnivorous plant genera Heliamphora and Nepenthes. More than half of all known Heliamphora species have been described by Wistuba.

== Publications ==
- Nerz, J. & A. Wistuba 1994. Five new taxa of Nepenthes (Nepenthaceae) from North and West Sumatra. Carnivorous Plant Newsletter 23(4): 101–114.
- Wistuba, A. & H. Rischer 1996. Nepenthes lavicola, a new species of Nepenthaceae from the Aceh Province in the North of Sumatra. Carnivorous Plant Newsletter 25(4): 106–111.
- Nerz, J. & A. Wistuba 2000. Heliamphora hispida (Sarraceniaceae), a new species from Cerro Neblina, Brazil-Venezuela. Carnivorous Plant Newsletter 29(2): 37–41.
- Wistuba, A., P. Harbarth & T. Carow 2001. Heliamphora folliculata, a new species of Heliamphora (Sarraceniaceae) from the ‘Los Testigos’ Table Mountains in the South of Venezuela. Carnivorous Plant Newsletter 30(4): 120–125.
- Wistuba, A., T. Carow & P. Harbarth 2002. Heliamphora chimantensis, a New Species of Heliamphora (Sarraceniaceae) from the ‘Macizo de Chimanta’ in the South of Venezuela. Carnivorous Plant Newsletter 31(3): 78–82.
- Carow, T., A. Wistuba & P. Harbarth 2005. Heliamphora sarracenioides, a New Species of Heliamphora (Sarraceniaceae) from Venezuela. Carnivorous Plant Newsletter 34(1): 4–6.
- Wistuba, A., T. Carow, P. Harbarth & J. Nerz 2005. Heliamphora pulchella, eine neue mit Heliamphora minor (Sarraceniaceae) verwandte Art aus der Chimanta Region in Venezuela. Das Taublatt 53(3): 42–50.
- Nerz, J. & A. Wistuba 2006. Heliamphora exappendiculata, a clearly distinct species with unique characteristics. Carnivorous Plant Newsletter 35(2): 43–51.
- Nerz, J., A. Wistuba & G. Hoogenstrijd 2006. Heliamphora glabra (Sarraceniaceae), eine eindrucksvolle Heliamphora Art aus dem westlichen Teil des Guayana Schildes. Das Taublatt 54: 58–70.
- Wistuba, A., J. Nerz & A. Fleischmann 2007. Nepenthes flava, a new species of Nepenthaceae from the northern part of Sumatra. Blumea 52: 159–163.
- Nerz, J. & A. Wistuba 2007. Nepenthes mantalingajanensis (Nepenthaceae), eine bemerkenswerte neue Spezies aus Palawan (Philippinen). Das Taublatt 55(3): 17–25.
- Fleischmann, A., A. Wistuba & J. Nerz. 2009. Three new species of Heliamphora (Sarraceniaceae) from the Guayana Highlands of Venezuela. Willdenowia 39(2): 273–283. doi:10.3372/wi.39.39206
- Gronemeyer, T., A. Wistuba, V. Heinrich, S. McPherson, F. Mey & A. Amoroso 2010. Nepenthes hamiguitanensis (Nepenthaceae), a new pitcher plant species from Mindanao Island, Philippines. In: S.R. McPherson Carnivorous Plants and their Habitats. Redfern Natural History Productions Ltd., Poole. pp. 1296–1305.
- Mey, F. S., Golos, M. R., Lim, G., Wistuba, A., Hagger, B., Robinson, A. S. 2025. Hiding in plain sight: Nepenthes batik (Nepenthaceae), an overlooked tropical pitcher plant from Fraser’s Hill, Peninsular Malaysia. Telopea 29: 15–36. https://doi.org/10.7751/telopea20171
