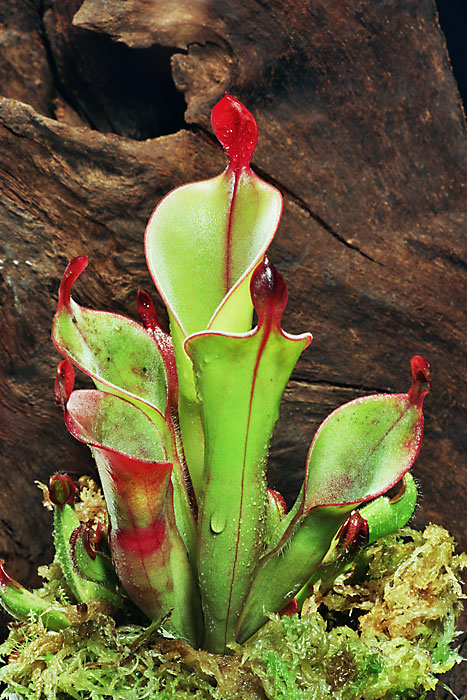
- Heliamphora chimantensis

Scientific classification
- Kingdom: Plantae
- Clade: Tracheophytes
- Clade: Angiosperms
- Clade: Eudicots
- Clade: Asterids
- Order: Ericales
- Family: Sarraceniaceae; Dumort.

Genera
- †?Archaeamphora; Darlingtonia; Heliamphora; Sarracenia

= Sarraceniaceae =

Sarraceniaceae Temporal range: Late Cretaceous? – recent

Family of carnivorous plants

Sarraceniaceae are a family of pitcher plants, belonging to order Ericales (reassigned from Nepenthales).

The family comprises three extant genera: Sarracenia (North American pitcher plants), Darlingtonia (the cobra lily or California pitcher plant), and Heliamphora (sun pitchers). The extinct Archaeamphora longicervia may also belong to this family, although later studies question that interpretation. All three are carnivorous plants that lure insects with nectar and use their elongated, tube-shaped leaves filled with water and digestive enzymes to catch and consume them. Digestive enzymes are not always produced by the plants themselves. Digestive mutualisms are common in Sarraceniaceae: both Sarracenia and Darlingtonia rely on commensal bacteria to supplement or produce all of their enzymes. Many species also use downward-pointing hairs and waxy secretions to make it difficult for insects to escape.

Sarracenia and Darlingtonia are native to North America, while Heliamphora is native to South America. Previous phylogenetic analysis suggests that the family originated in South America about 47 million years ago and spread to North America soon after, about 35 million years ago. The Sarracenia and Heliamphora clade diverged from Darlingtonia around this time, most likely due to a cooling event at the beginning of the Oligocene. Sarracenia diverged from Heliamphora later, around 23 million years ago. However, recent study found that the divergence times in Sarraceniaceae could be much older. The family could have originated about 88 million years ago during Late Cretaceous. The Sarracenia and Heliamphora clade could have diverged from Darlingtonia around 54 million years ago during Early Eocene. Sarracenia and Heliamphora could have split around 36 million years ago during Late Eocene.

These plants grow in nutrient-poor, often acidic soil and use the insects as a nutritional supplement. As such, growth of carnivorous pitchers is plastic: as soil nitrogen increases, Sarracenia produces fewer pitchers. The pitchers originate from a rhizome and die back during the winter dormancy. Plants of the genus Sarracenia occur mostly in Sphagnum bogs.

Most Sarraceniaceae have tall, narrow pitchers that are vertical or nearly so. Sarracenia purpurea, however, has short, squat, bulbous pitchers close to the ground, and Sarracenia psittacina has pitchers that grow horizontally.

The purple pitcher plant (Sarracenia purpurea) is the official flower of Newfoundland and Labrador.

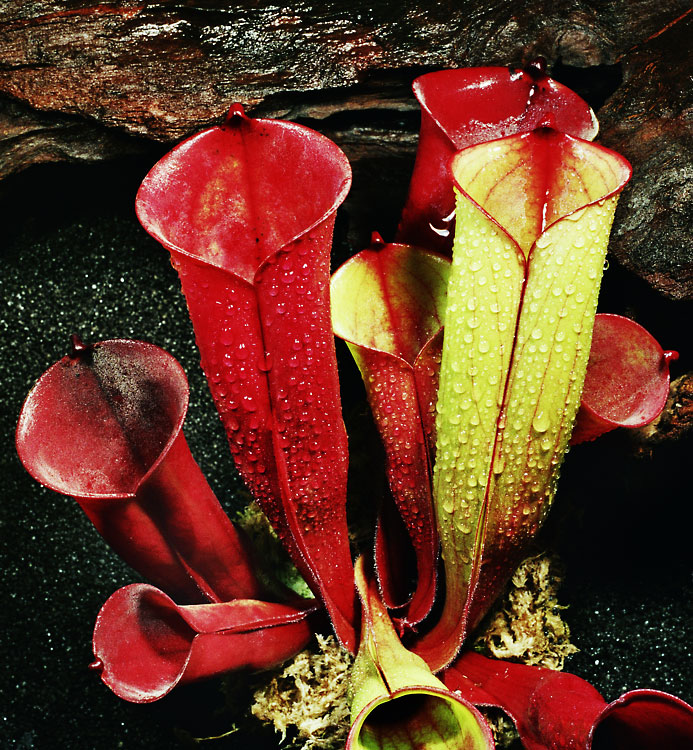
Heliamphora

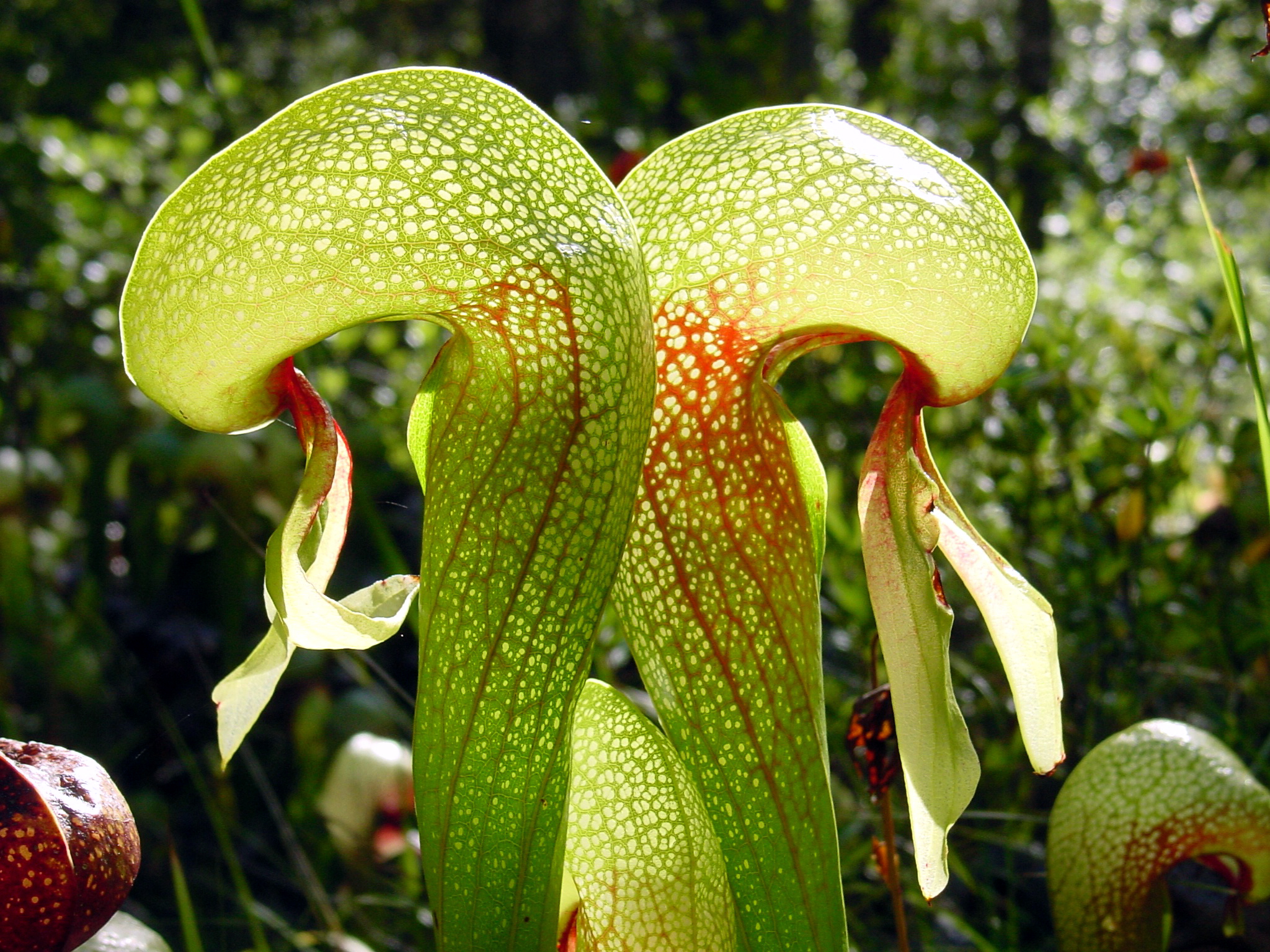
Darlingtonia californica

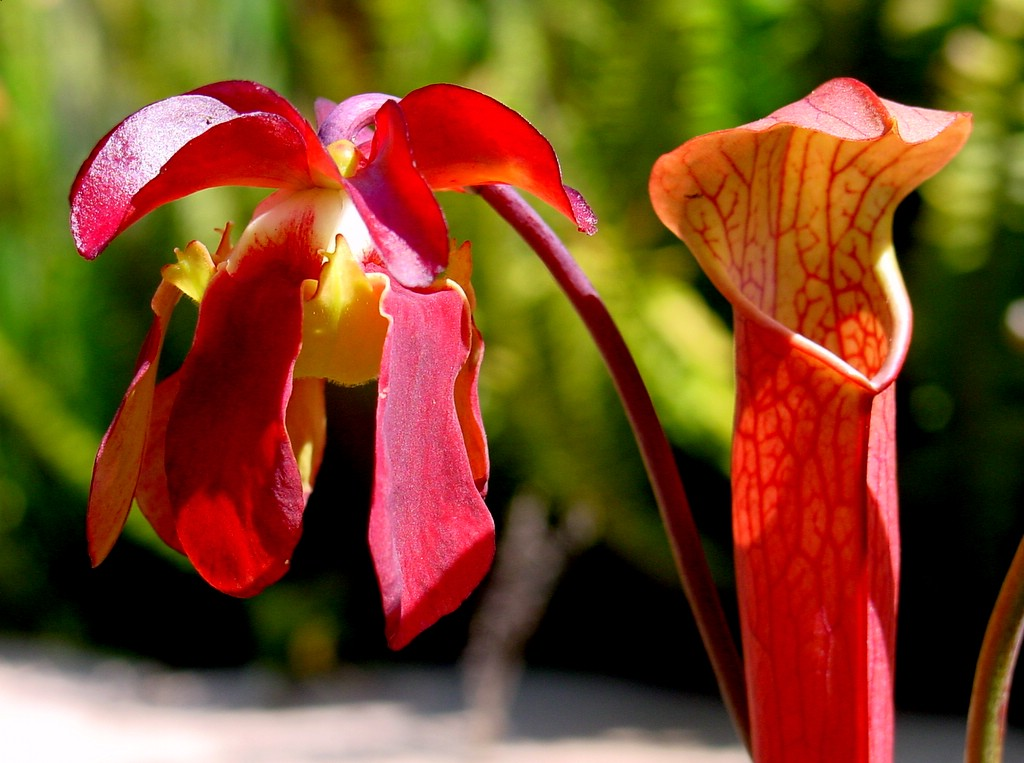
Sarracenia

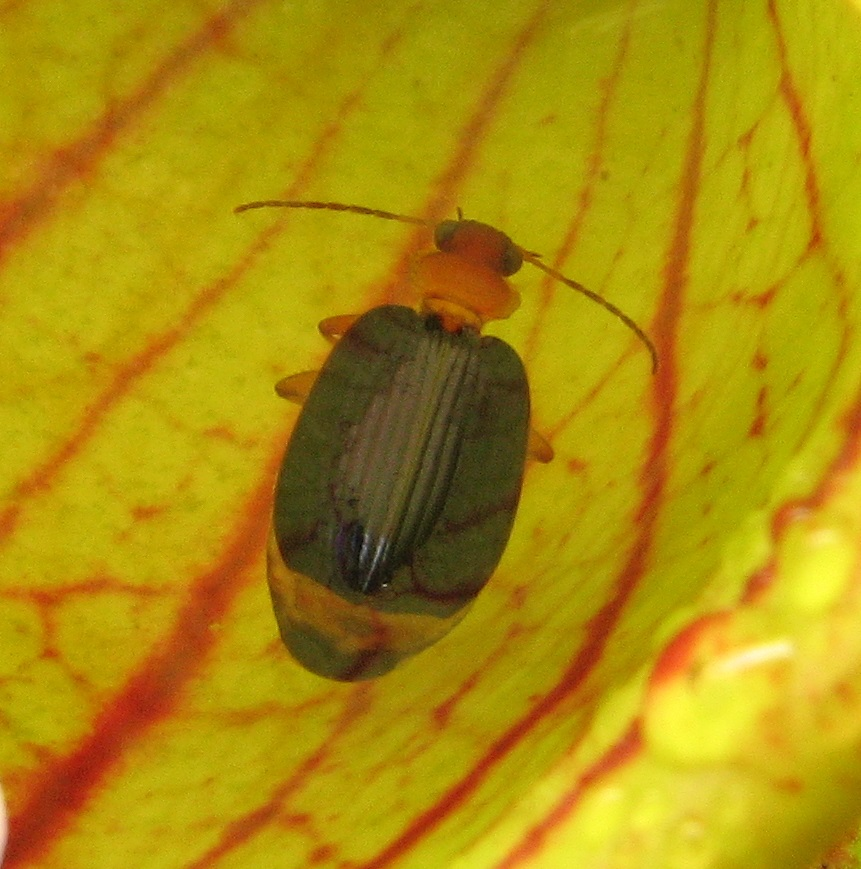
Lebia grandis trapped by Sarracenia purpurea.

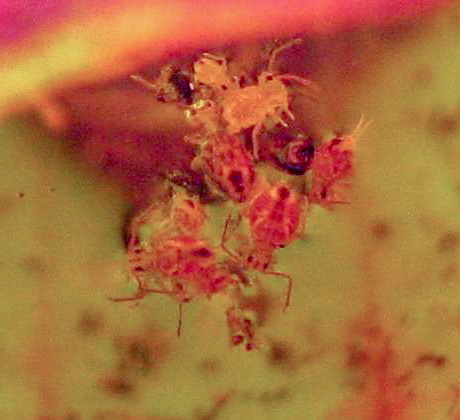
Dicyrtomina minuta (Collembola) trapped by Sarracenia purpurea.

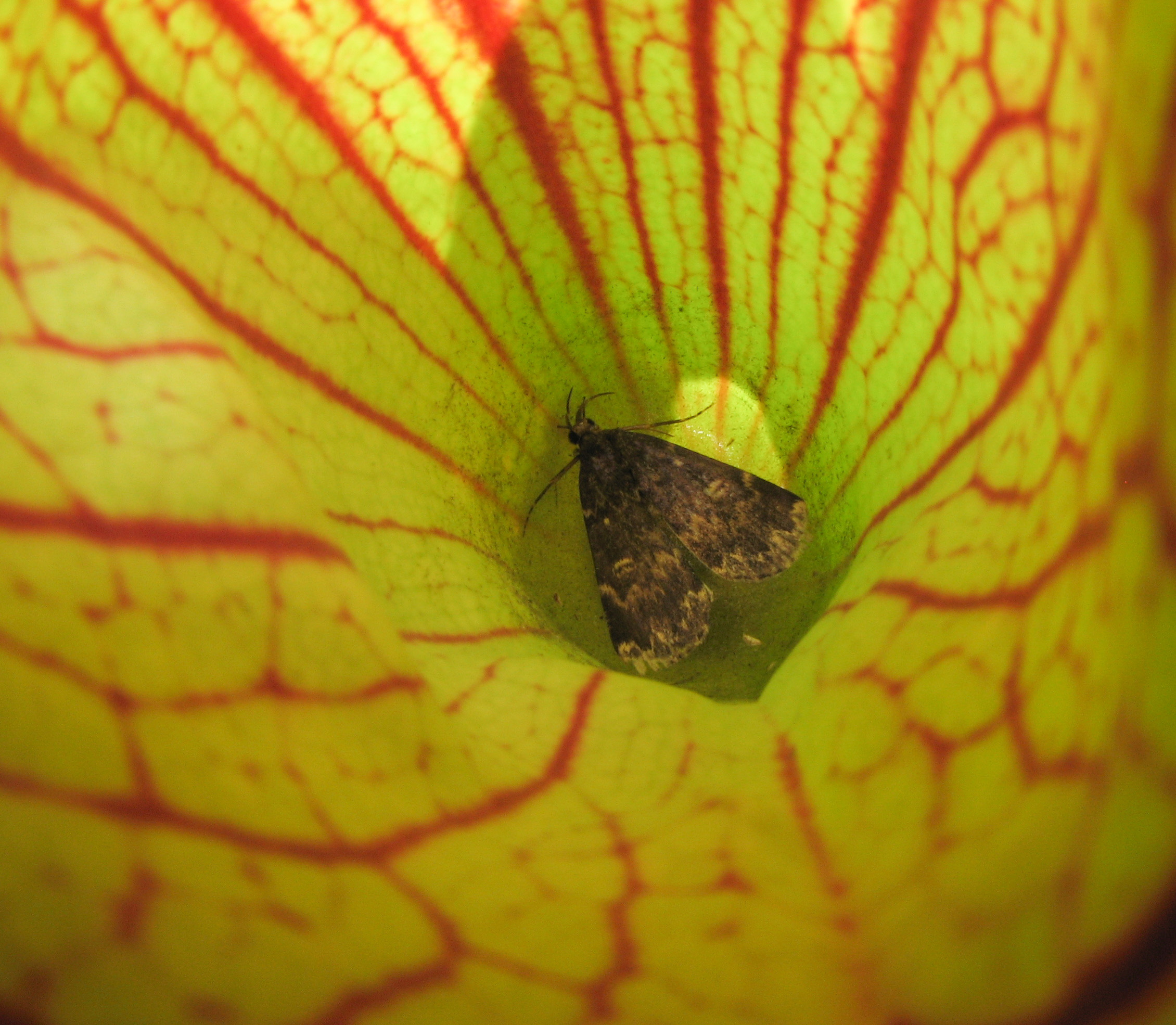
Moth, Idia lubricalis in Sarracenia purpurea.

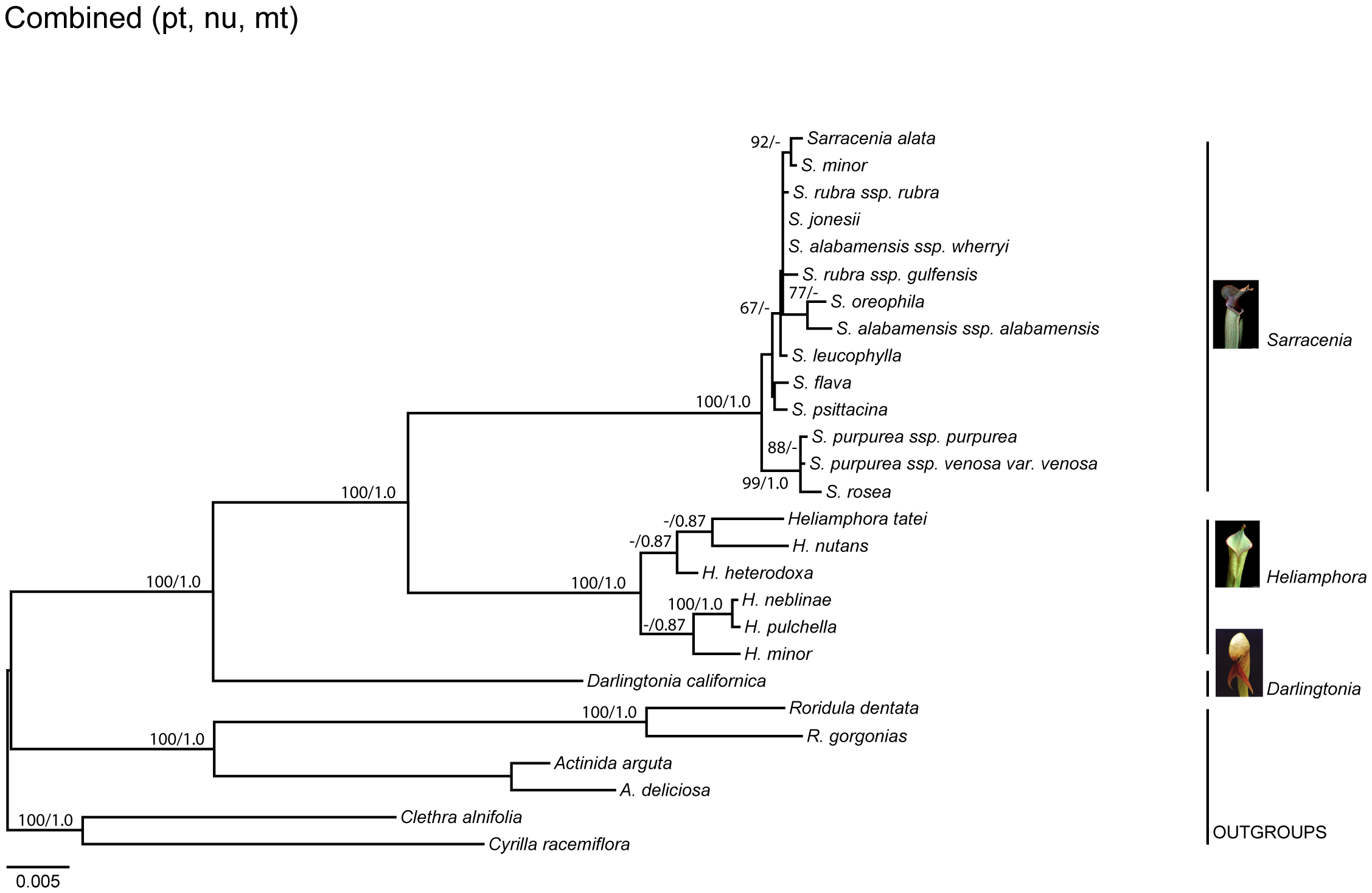
Combined nuclear, plastid and mitochondrial phylogeny of Sarraceniaceae

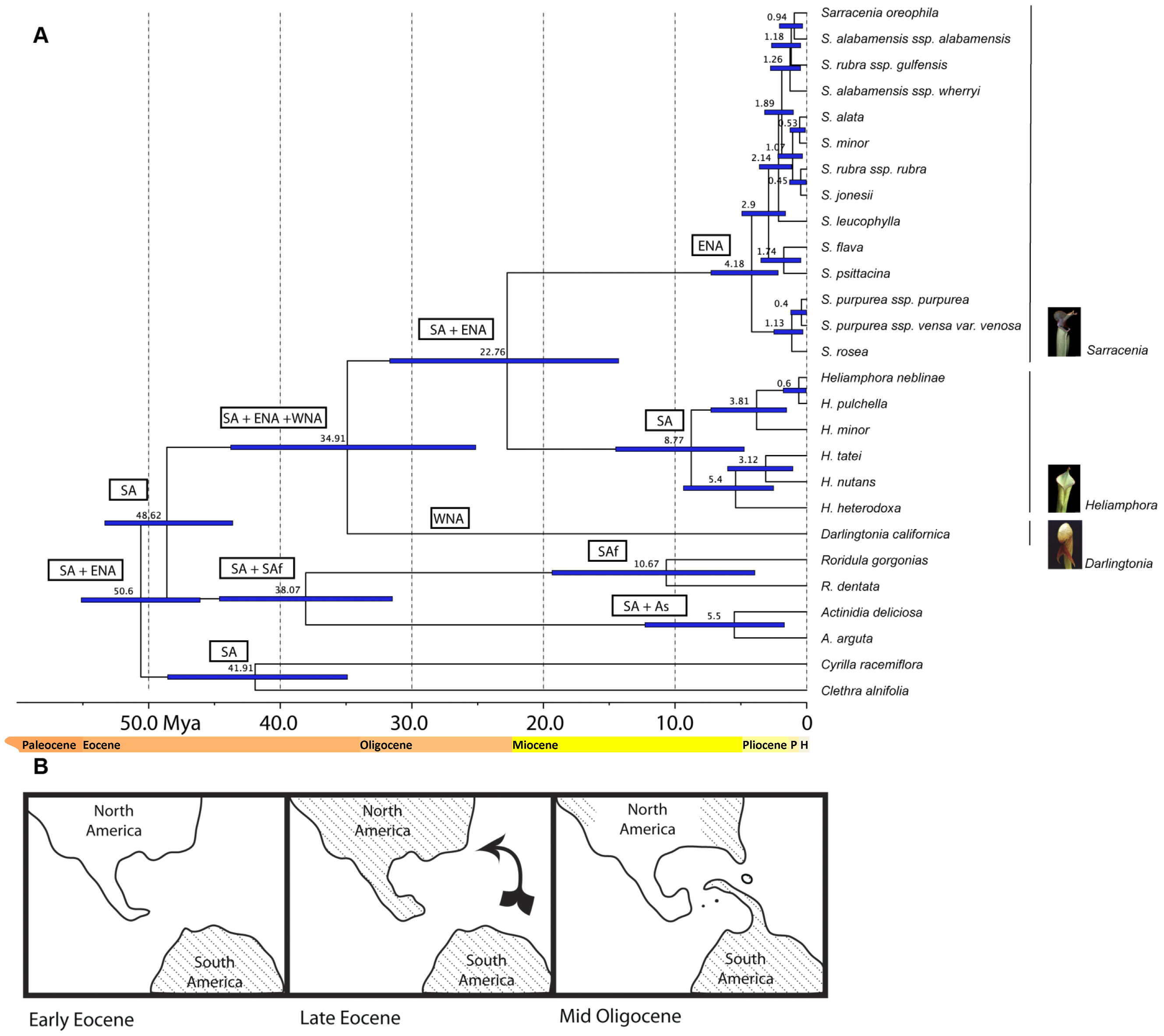
Sarraceniaceae chronogram based on combined data
