= Canaima National Park =

National park in Venezuela

- IUCN category II (national park)
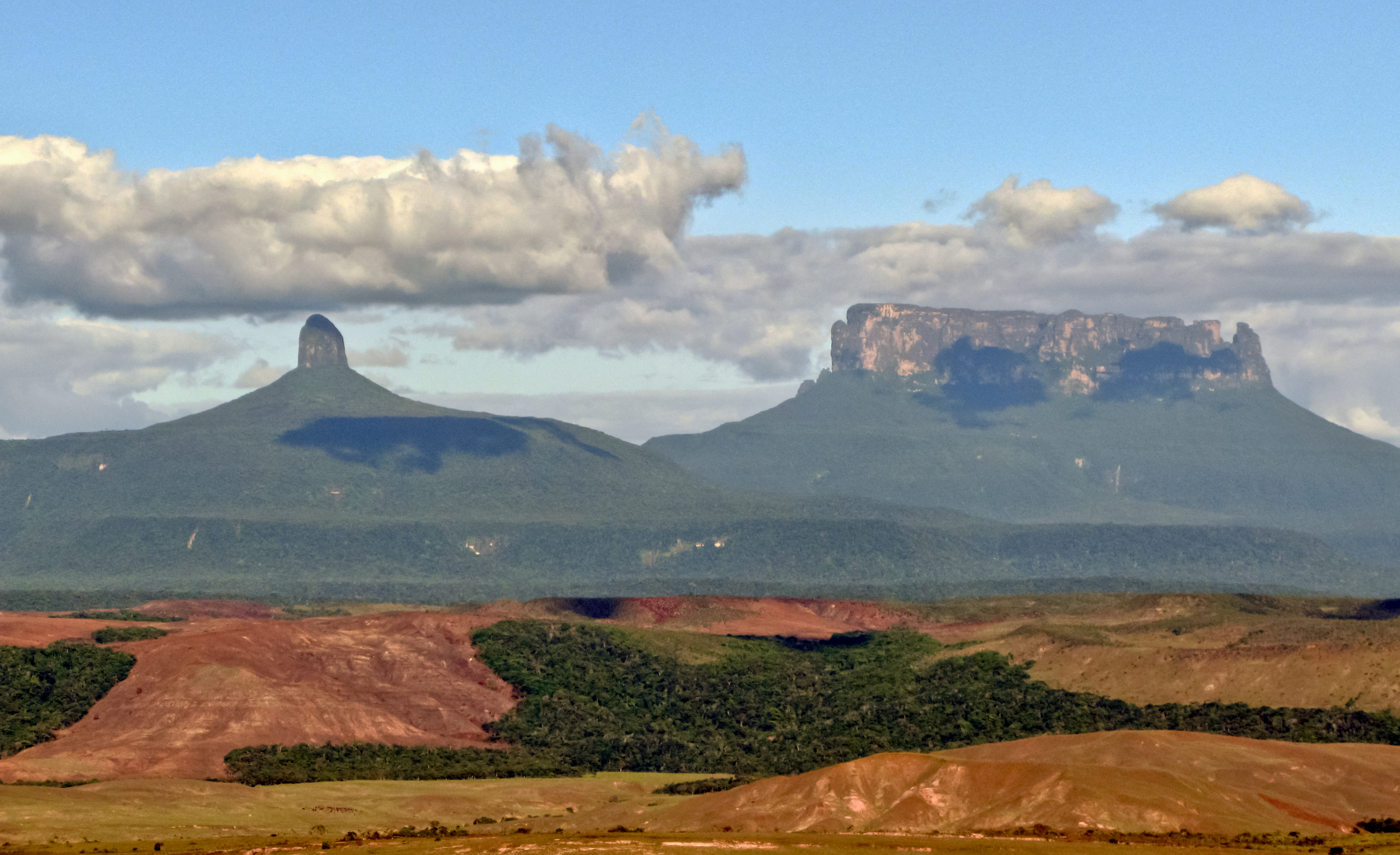
- Wadakapiapué-tepui and Yuruaní-tepui in Canaima National Park

- Location within Venezuela
- Location: Bolívar State, Venezuela
- Coordinates: 6°10′N 62°30′W
- Area: 30,000 km^{2} (12,000 sq mi)
- Established: June 12, 1962

UNESCO World Heritage Site
- Type: Natural
- Criteria: vii, viii, ix, x
- Designated: 1994 (18th session)
- Reference no.: 701
- Region: Latin America and the Caribbean

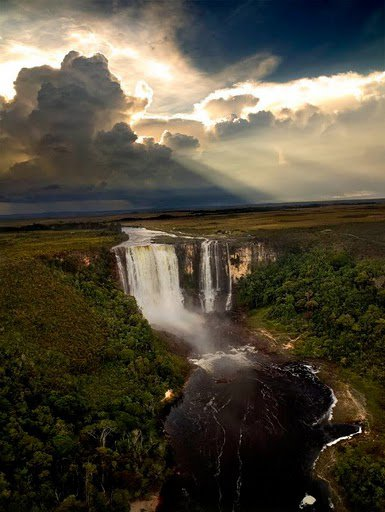
Canaima, Venezuela

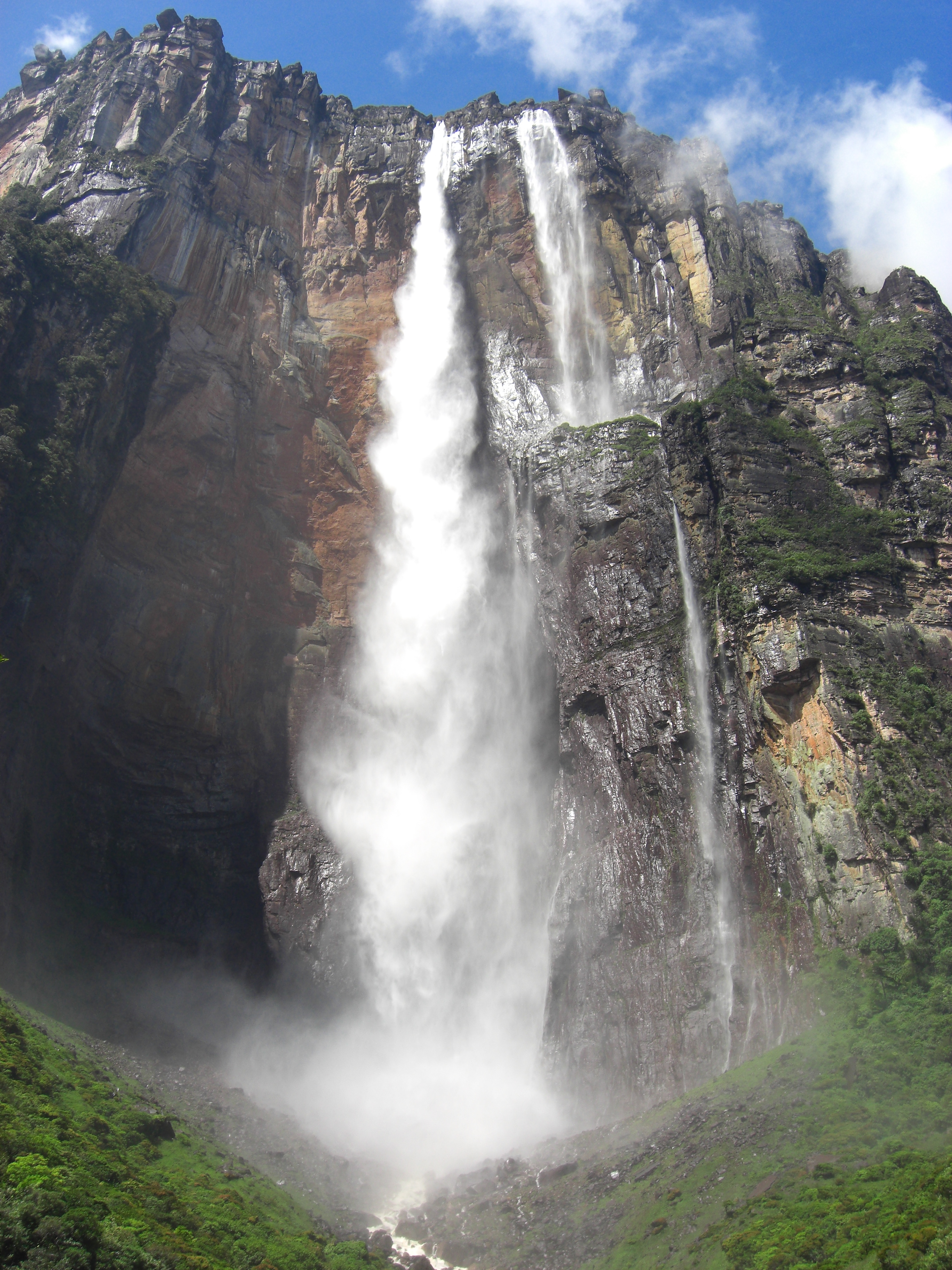
Angel Falls is the highest waterfall in the world.

Canaima National Park (Spanish: Parque Nacional Canaima) is a 30,000 km^{2} (12,000 sq mi) park in south-eastern Venezuela that roughly occupies the same area as the Gran Sabana region. It is located in Bolívar State, reaching the borders with Brazil and Guyana. The park was named a World Heritage Site by UNESCO.

== History ==
Canaima National Park was established on 12 June 1962. As early as 1990, the countries that participate in the Amazonian Cooperation Treaty had recommended expanding the Canaima National Park southward to connect it with Monte Roraima National Park in Brazil, with coordinated management of tourism, research and conservation.

In 1994, the Canaima National Park was named a World Heritage Site by UNESCO. The International Union for Conservation of Nature performed a conservation assessment in 2017, which listed Canaima National Park as an area of significant concern, citing ineffective protection and management.

== Location ==
Canaima National Park is the second largest park in Venezuela, after Parima-Tapirapecó, and sixth biggest national park in the world. It is roughly the same size as Belgium or Maryland. The park protects part of the Guayanan Highlands moist forests ecoregion.

About 65% of the park is occupied by plateaus of rock called tepuis, which are a kind of table-top mountain millions of years old, with vertical walls and almost flat tops. These constitute a unique biological environment and are also of great geological interest. Their sheer cliffs and waterfalls including Angel Falls, which is the highest waterfall in the world, at 979 metres (3,212 ft).

The most famous tepuis in the park are Mount Roraima, the tallest and easiest to climb, and Auyantepui, the site of Angel Falls. The tepuis are sandstone and date back to a time when South America and Africa were part of a super-continent.

The park is home to indigenous Pemon Indians, part of the Carib linguistic group. The Pemon have an intimate relationship with the tepuis, and believe they are the home of the 'Mawari' spirits. The park is relatively remote, with only a few roads connecting towns. Most transport within the park is done by light plane from the airstrips built by various Capuchin missions, or by foot and canoe.

== Fauna ==
Canaima has a varied fauna, which is distributed throughout the park according to multiple environmental factors such as altitude and vegetation type. Among the species found are:

- Giant armadillo (Priodontes maximus)
- Giant otter (Pteronura brasiliensis)
- Giant anteater (Myrmecophaga tridactyla)
- Cougar (Puma concolor)
- Jaguar (Panthera onca)
- Linnaeus's two-toed sloth (Choloepus didactylus)
- White-faced saki (Pithecia pithecia)
- Brown-backed bearded saki (Chiropotes israelita)
- Roraima mouse (Podoxymys roraimae)
- Tyleria mouse opossum (Marmosa tyleriana)
- Harpy eagle (Harpia harpyja)
- Red-shouldered macaw (Diopsittaca nobilis)
- Dusky parrot (Pionus fuscus)
- Yellow-banded poison dart frog (Dendrobates leucomelas)
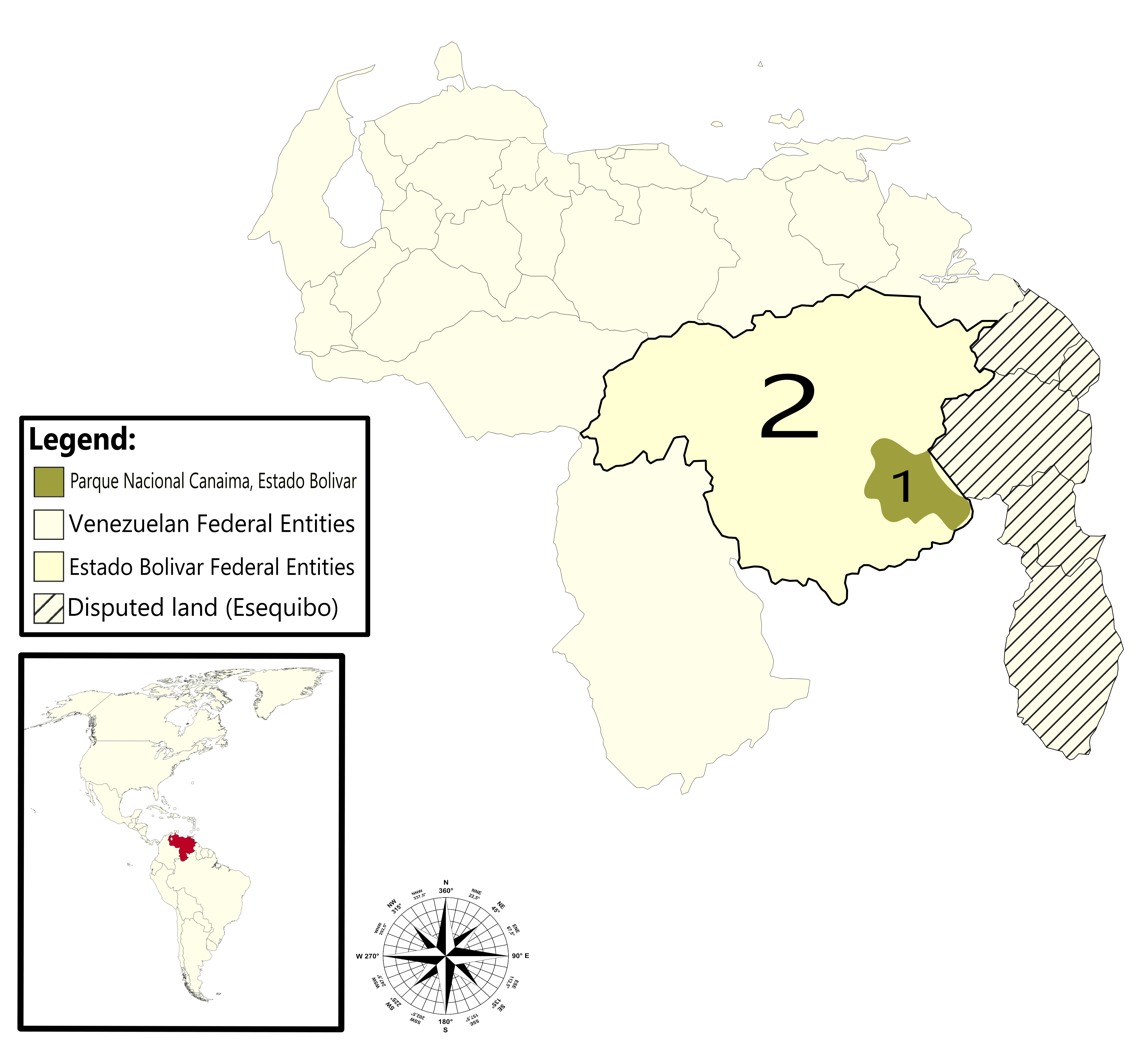
- Map showing the location and extension of the Canaima National Park. 2: Bolivar State, 1: Canaima National Park
  Green iguana (Iguana iguana)
- Hummingbirds (Trochilinae)
- Toucans (Ramphastidae)
- South American bushmaster (Lachesis muta)
- Green acouchi (Myoprocta pratti)
- Bush dog (Speothos venaticus)

Canaima National Park is among one of several dozen regions in Venezuela that has been identified as an Important Bird and Biodiversity Area (IBAs) by BirdLife International, a global cooperative of non-governmental organizations focused on the conservation of the world’s birds and their natural habitats.

== Flora ==
There are over 300 botanical species endemic only to La Gran Sabana. Some endemic plant species are categorized as "carnivorous", which are thus the food supply (mainly insects) that are so scarce in the mountains.

- Endemic flora includes Achnopogon, Adenanthe, Chimantaea, Mallophyton, Quelchia, Tepuia.
- Endemic carnivorous plants include the Heliamphora (South American pitcher plants) and Brocchinia (a type of bromeliad), as well as several local species of Drosera (sundews), Genlisea (corkscrew plants) and Utricularia (bladderworts).

== Hydrography ==
The park includes the entire watershed of the right bank of the Caroní River and two of the highest waterfalls in the world, Angel Falls and the Kukenán, as well as plenty of waterfalls of lower altitude.

== Land forms ==
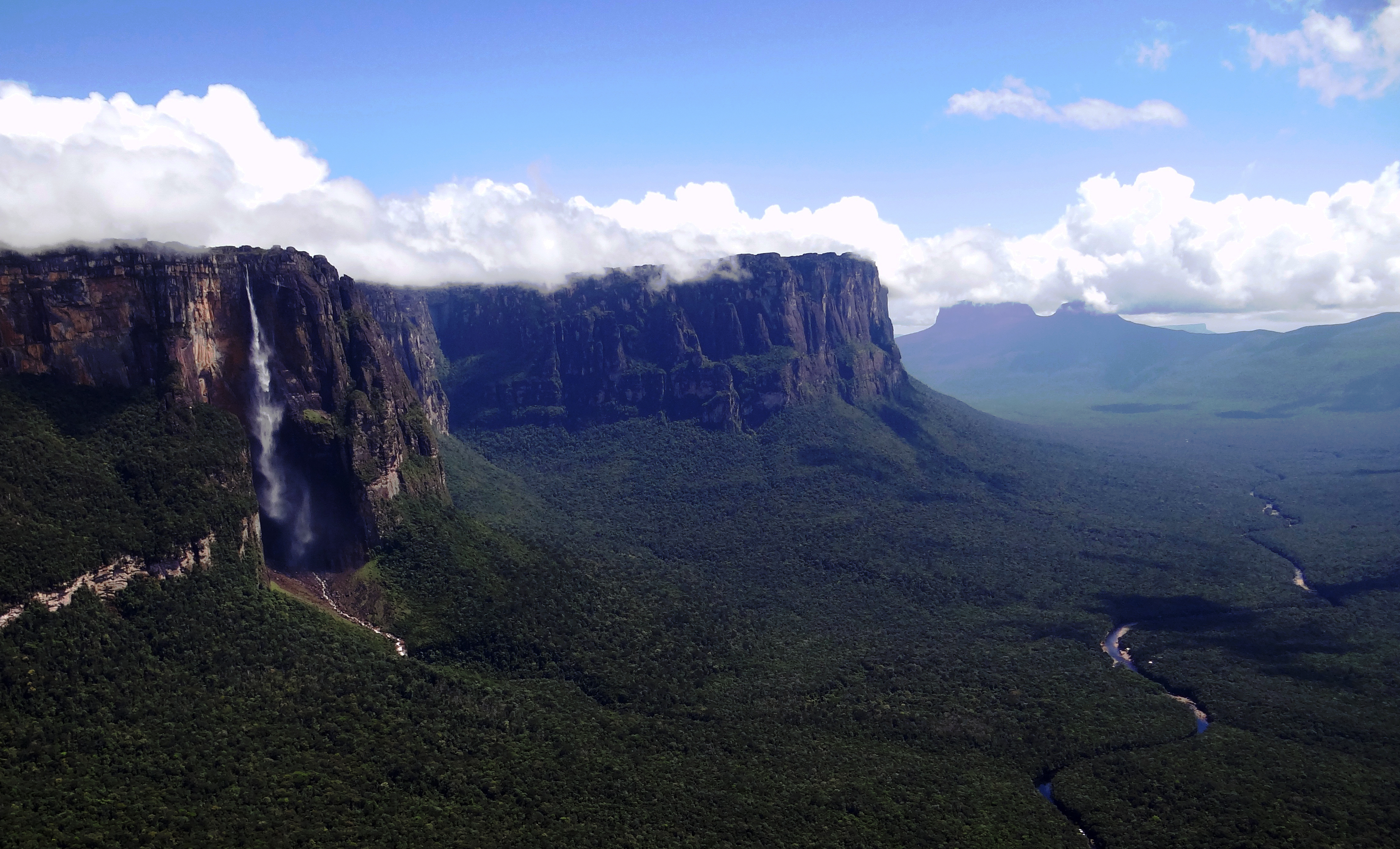
Devil's Canyon in the Canaima National Park

The only land form are the tepuis, that are plateaus which are unique features, among which are its vertical and nearly flat tops, although there are several tepuis that do not meet these rules. Geologically they are remnants of a sedimentary cover composed of very ancient sandstone that is superimposed on a base of igneous rocks (mainly granite) that is even older (nearly three billion years).

Their summits are home to a substantial amount of specific endemic species, both plant and animal. These have a geological formations ranging between 1.5 and 2 billion years, which makes them one of the oldest formations in the world.

== Tourist attractions ==
=== Western Sector ===
Lagoon of Canaima; El Sapo and El Sapito Falls; Yuri Falls; Mayupa Rapids; Pozo de la Felicidad (Pit of the Happiness) (Saró Marú); Orquídea Island; Ratón Island; Angel Falls or Korepakupai Vená; Ayan-tepui; Kavac Indian village	Cave Uruyén; Kamarata Indian village; Wareipa Indian community; El Encanto Falls; Avak Indian community; Roberto Beach; Kanwaripa Indian community; Caroní River; La Maloca Indian village; Kukenán Falls (in the Tepui Kukenán or Matawí)

=== Eastern Sector ===
La Piedra de La Virgen (The rock of the virgin); El Danto Falls; La Arenaria; Monumento al Soldado Pionero; Aponwao I River; Tarotá Baths; Toroncito Ravine; Toron merú Falls; Karuay Falls; Chinak merú Falls (Aponwao falls); Parupa; Anotén; Chivatón Falls	Mission of Kavanayen; Kamoirán Rapids; Kama merú Falls; Arapán merú (Pacheco Ravine); Soruapa River or Woimeri; San Francisco de Yuruaní (Kumaracapai) Indian Community; Jasper Creek (Kako Parú or Jaspe Ravine); Urué merú; Kukenán Bridge River; Paraitepui Indian Community of Roraima; Wonkén Indian Community; Mount Roraima.

As of 1993, Canaima National Park was reported to receive approximately 100,000 tourists every year, with 90% visiting its plateaus. Only a select few of its tepuis are accessible to visitors, with those including Roraima and Auyán-tepui. Angel Falls is also a popular tourist spot, where visitors can canoe through the park’s vast rainforest.

== Archaeology ==
Pictographic rock art belonging to an obscure culture was found. The sites are estimated to be 4 to 7 thousand years old, long predating the arrival of the Pemon.

== Popular culture ==
Canaima is the name given to the fictional Californian coastal town (which was filmed in Cambria, California) where the movie Arachnophobia is supposed to take place. The introductory and jungle scenes of the movie were filmed in the national park.

== Gallery ==
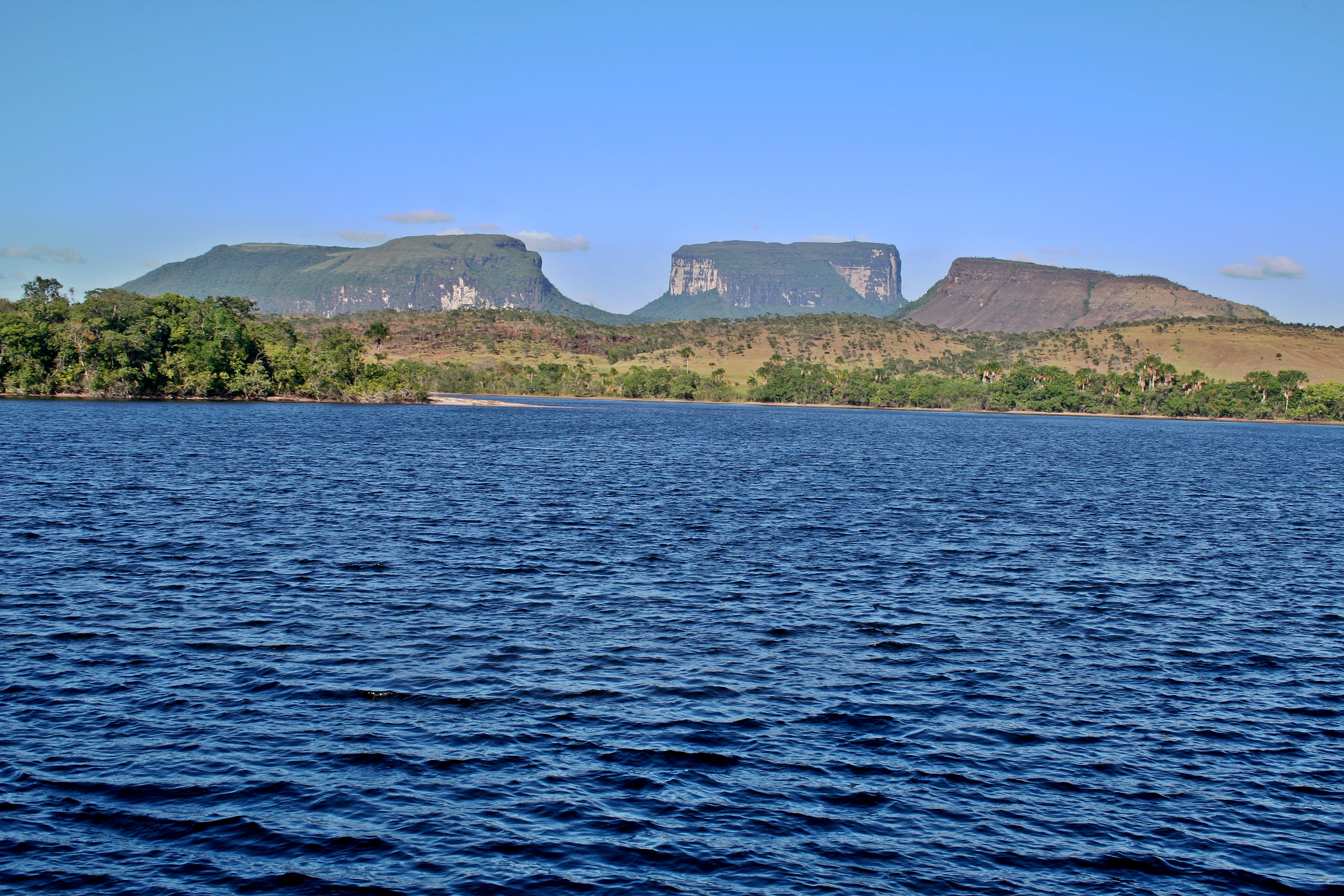
from left: Kurun tepui, Kusari tepui and Kuravaina tepui

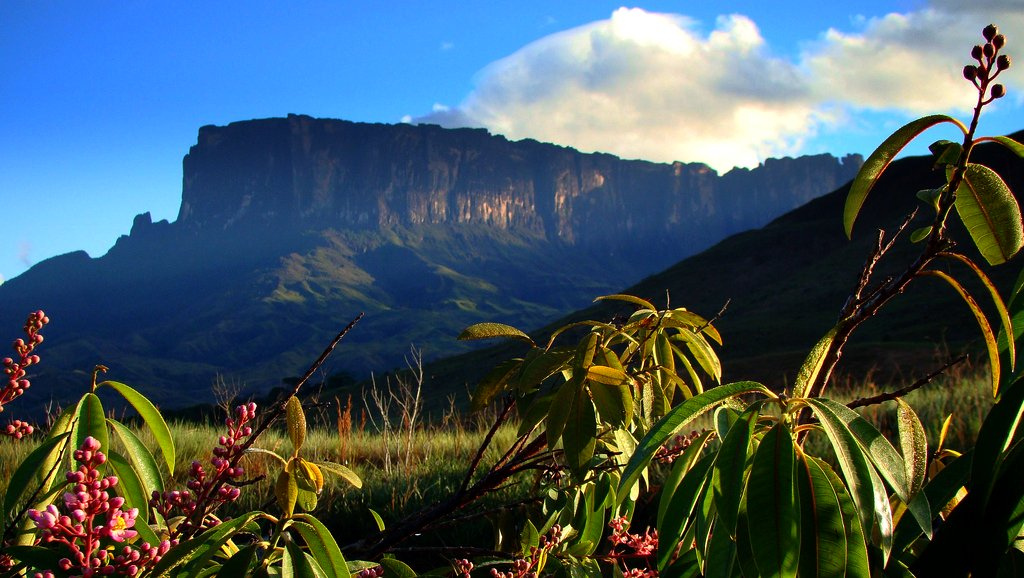
Kukenán-tepui view from base

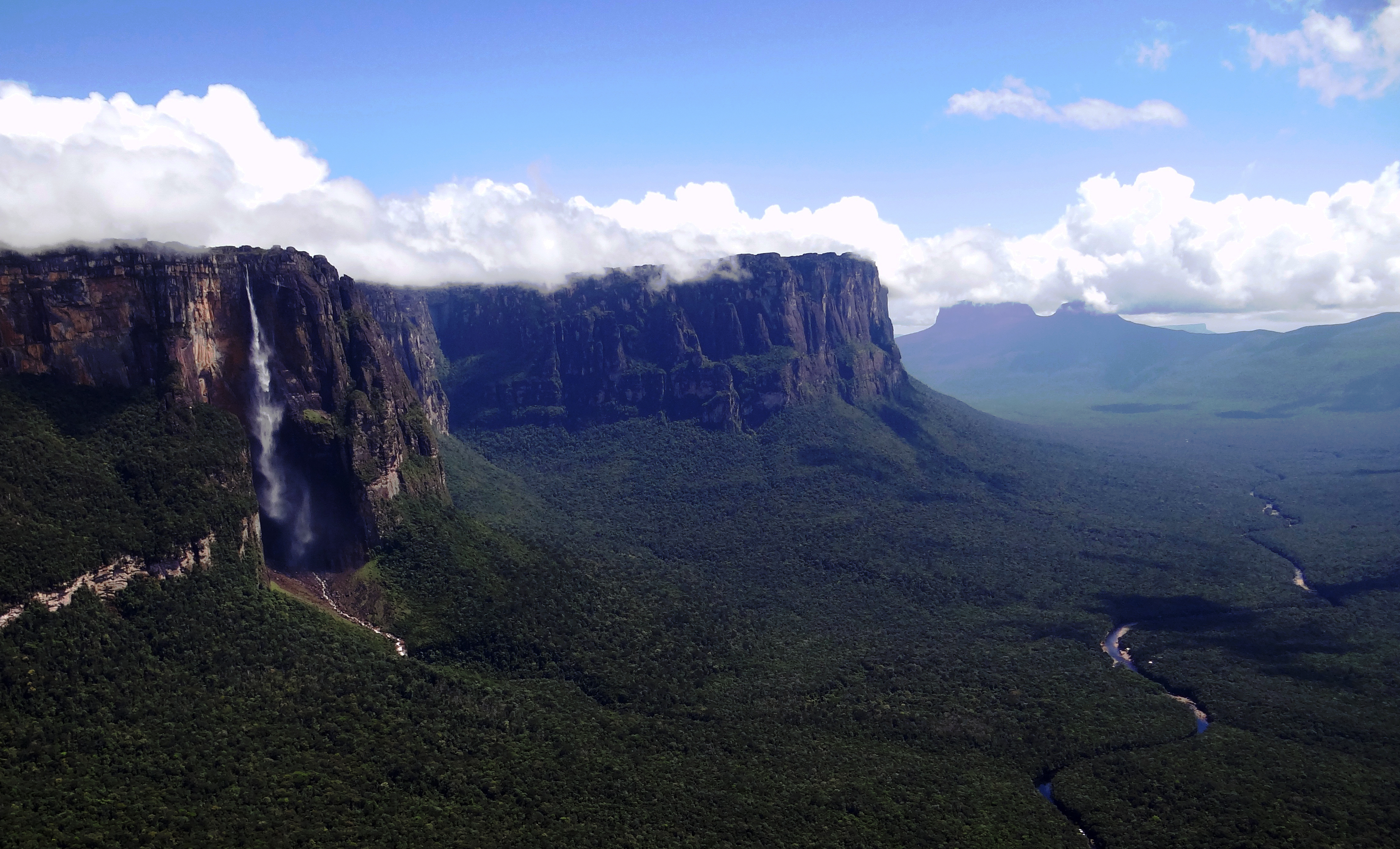
Rio Churun devils canyon and Angel Falls

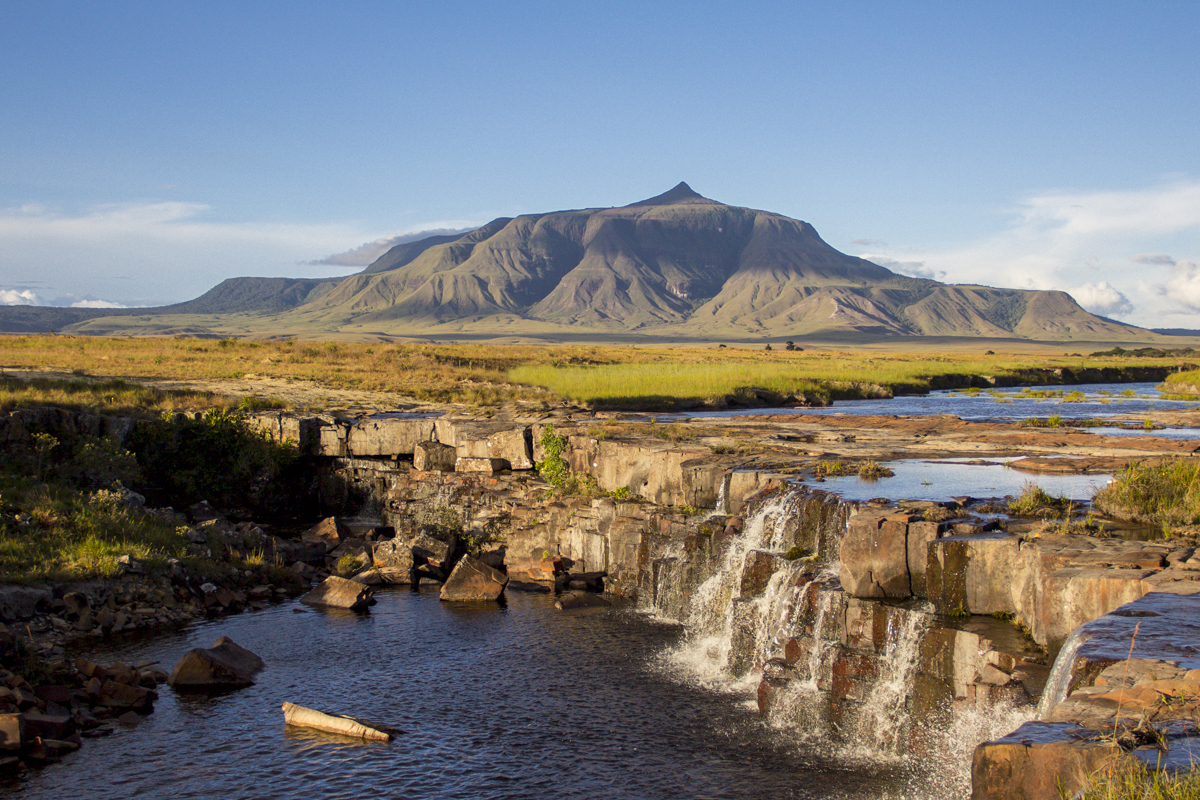
Uei-tepui and Chirimata Falls

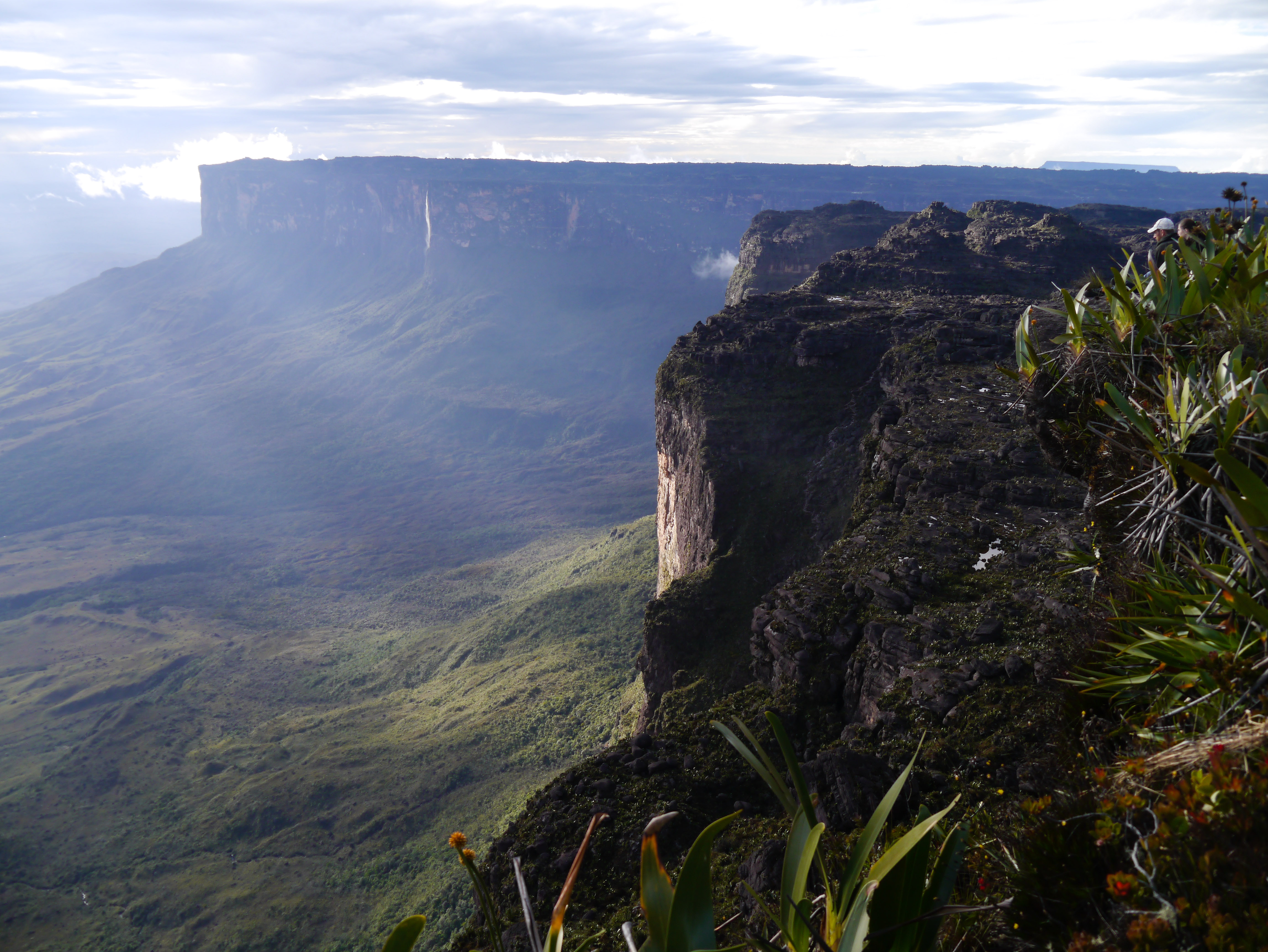
Mount Roraima

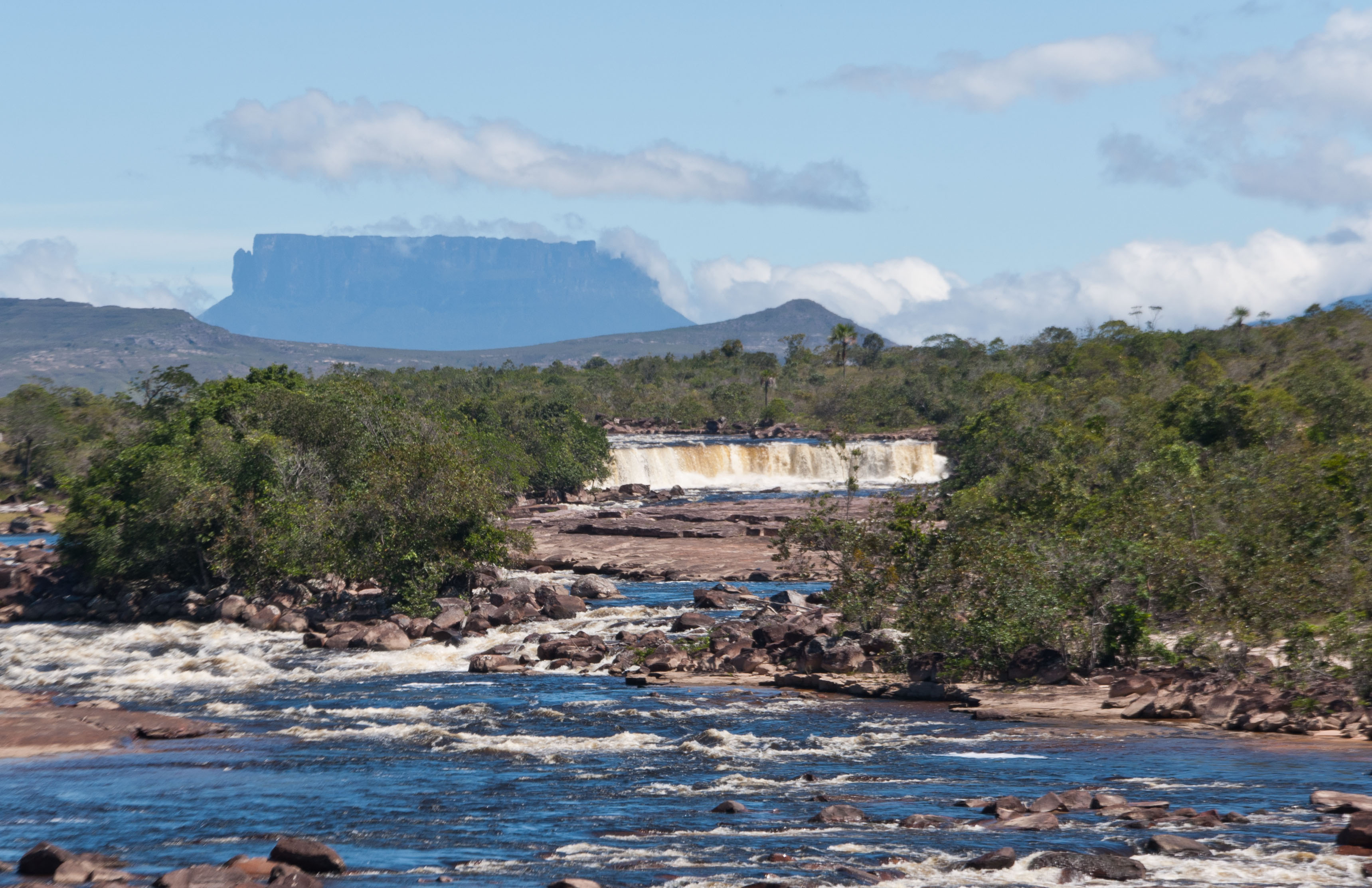
Yuruaní River and Yuruaní-tepui

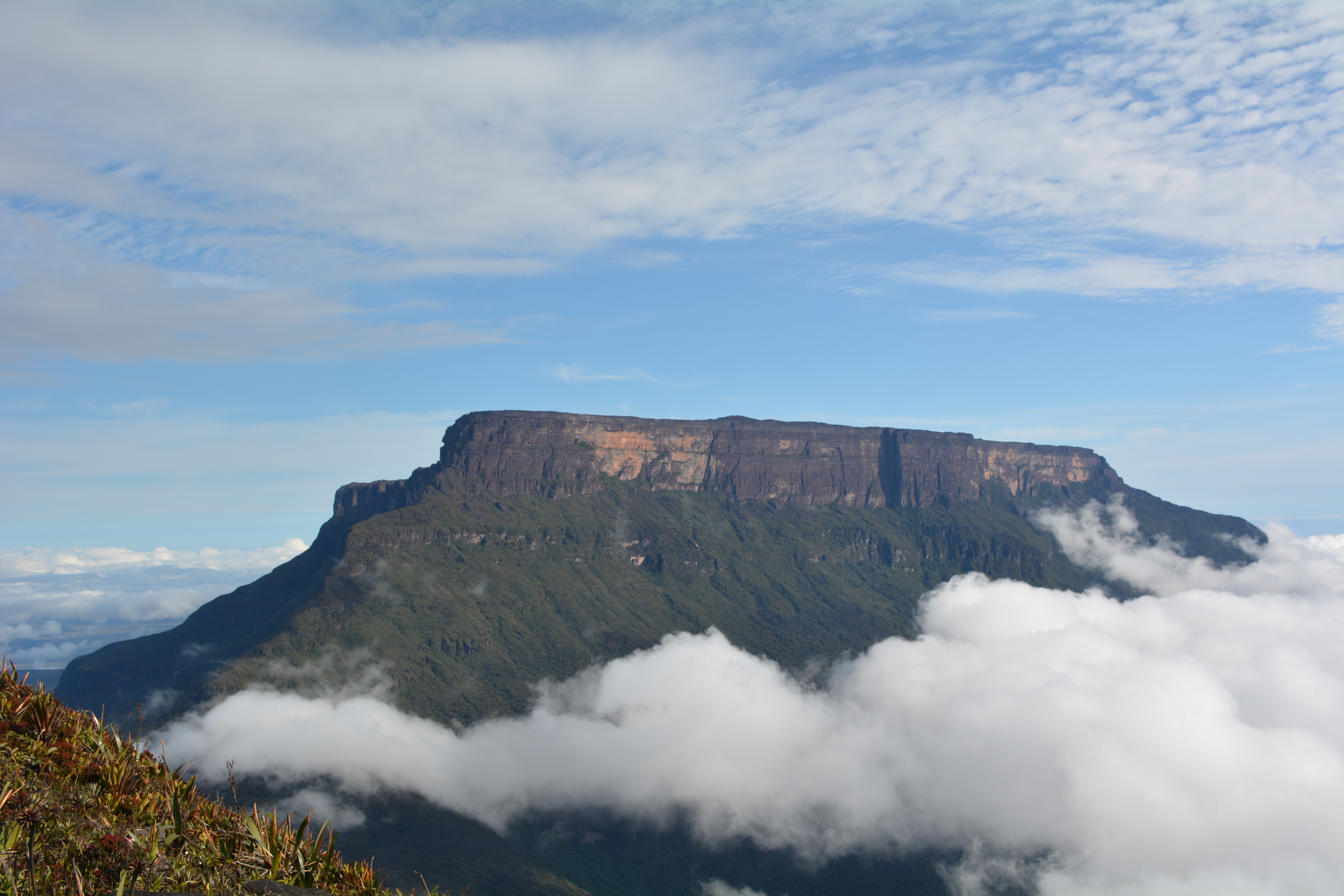
Ilú-tepui

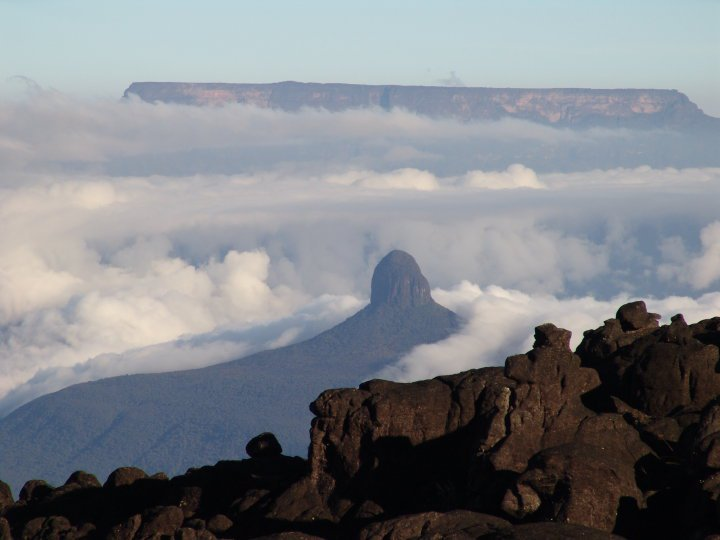
Wadakapiapué-tepui and Ilú–tepui

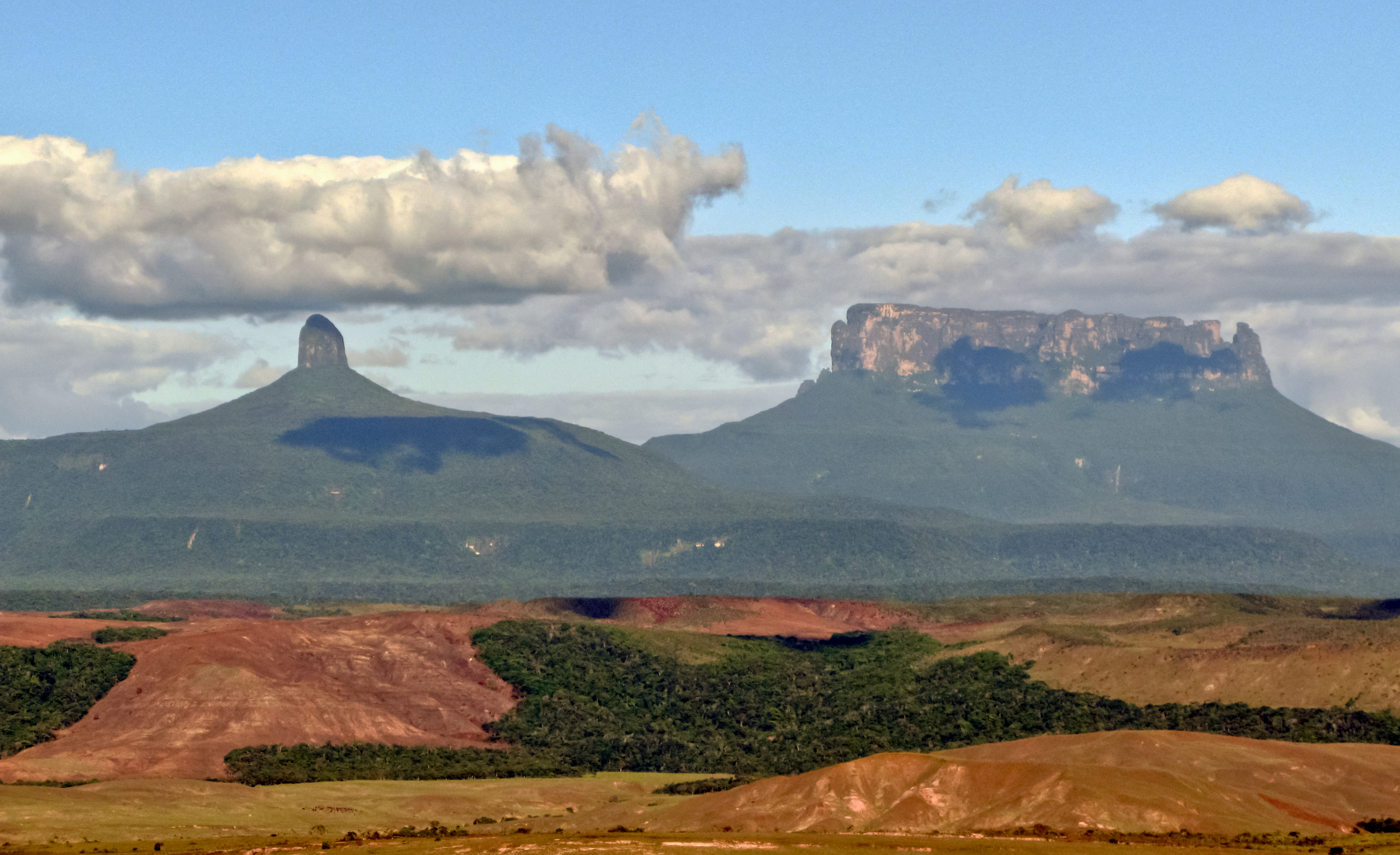
Yuruaní-tepui and Wadakapiapué-tepui

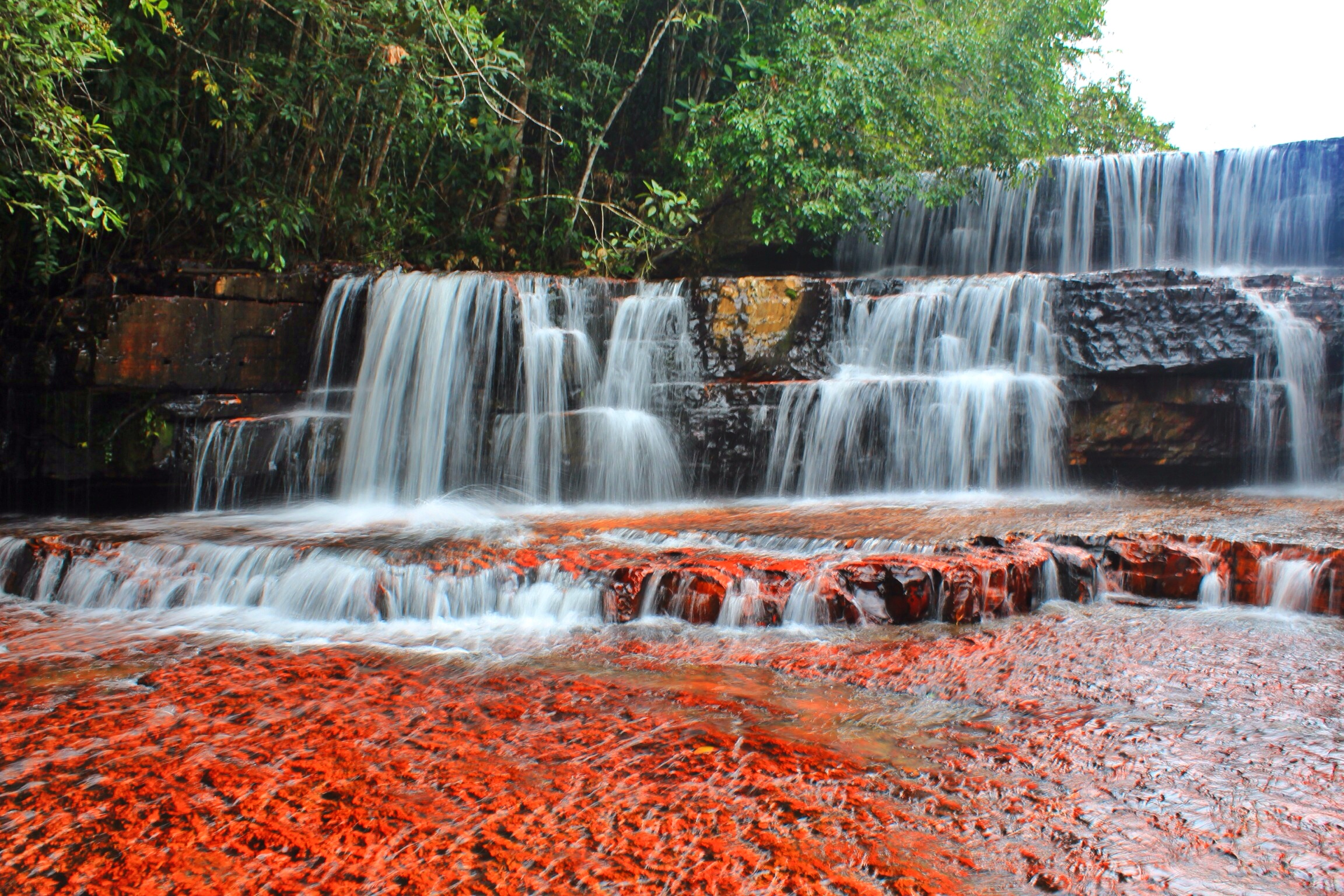
Jasper Creek

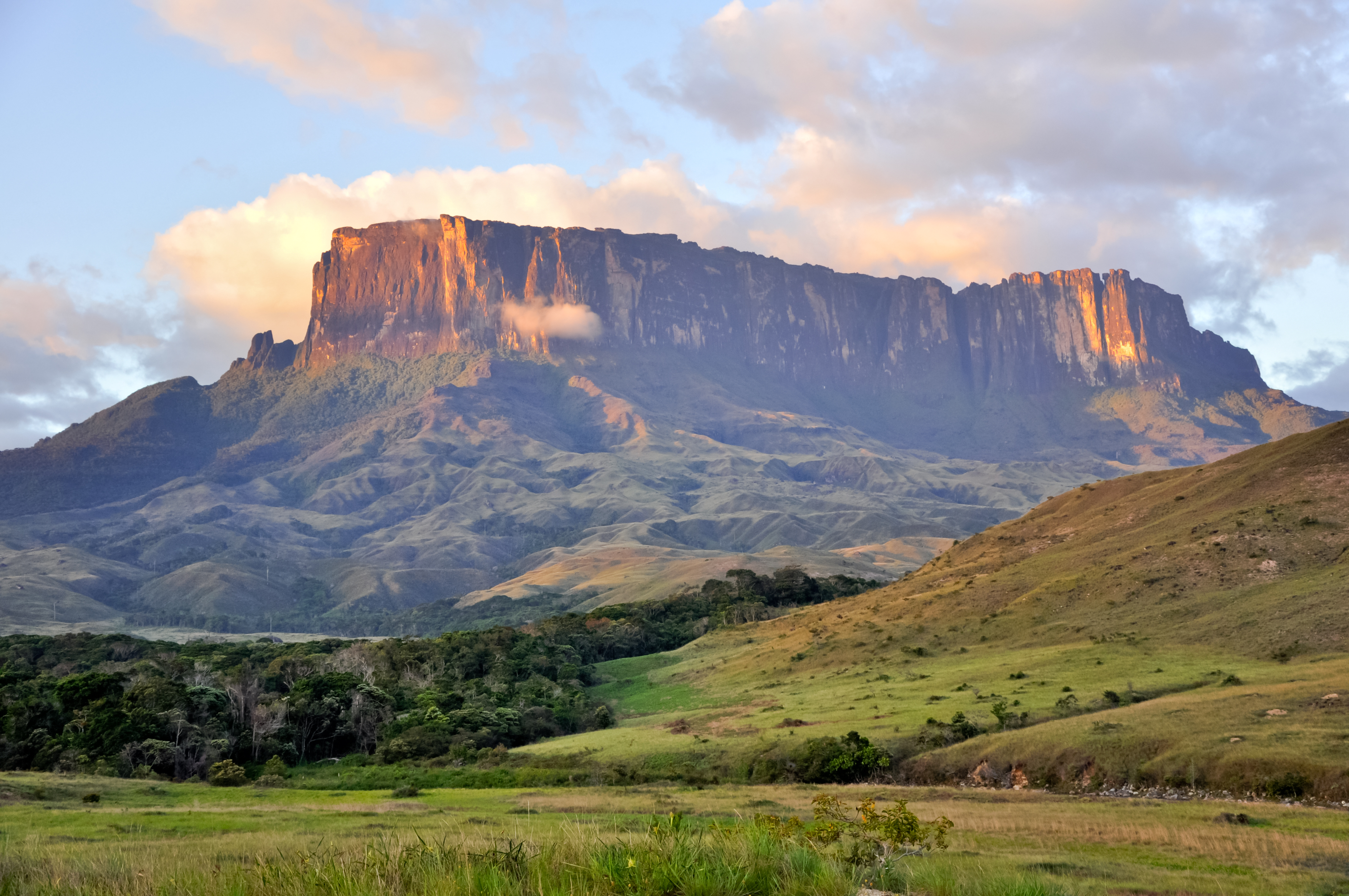
Kukenán-tepui

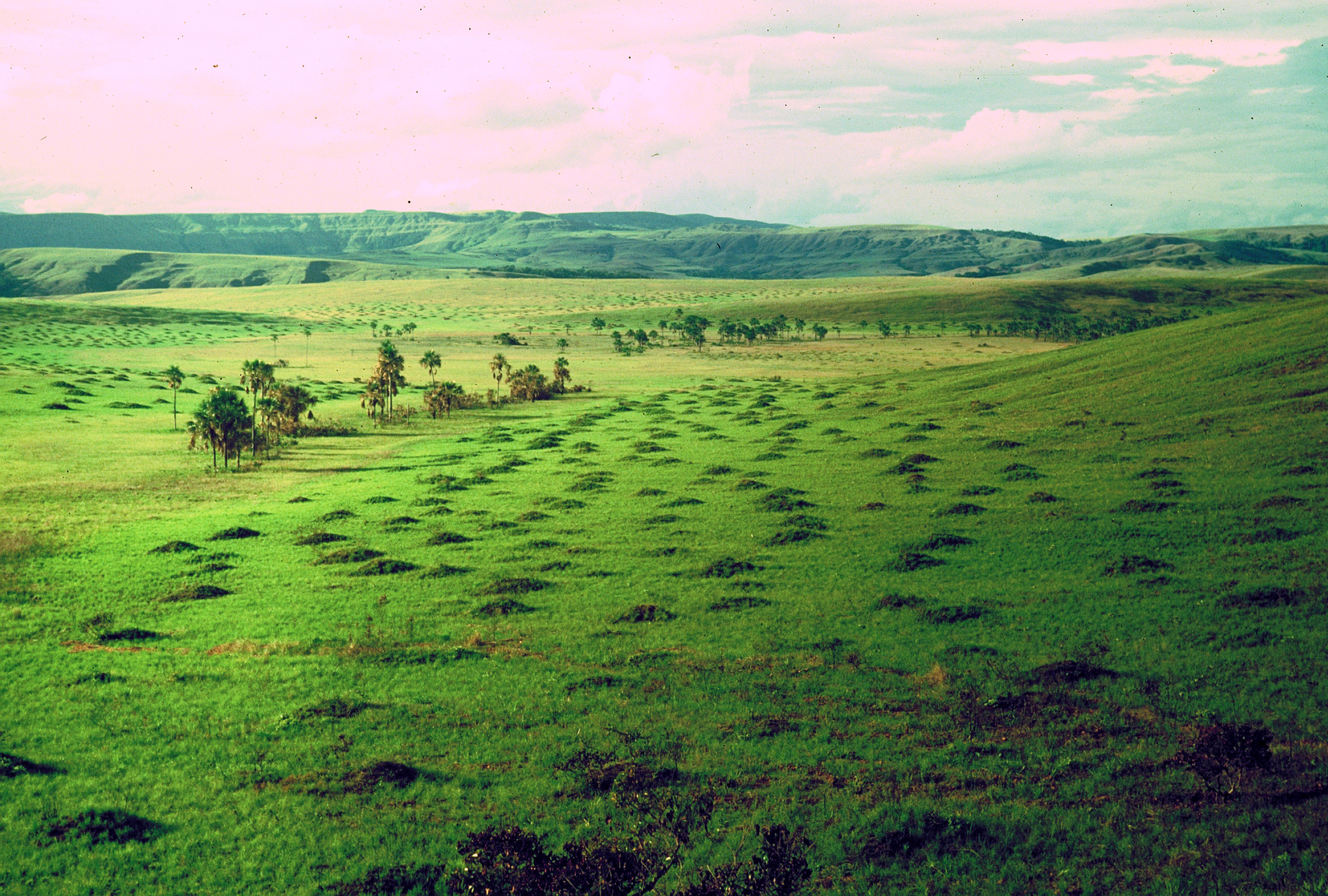
La Gran Sabana

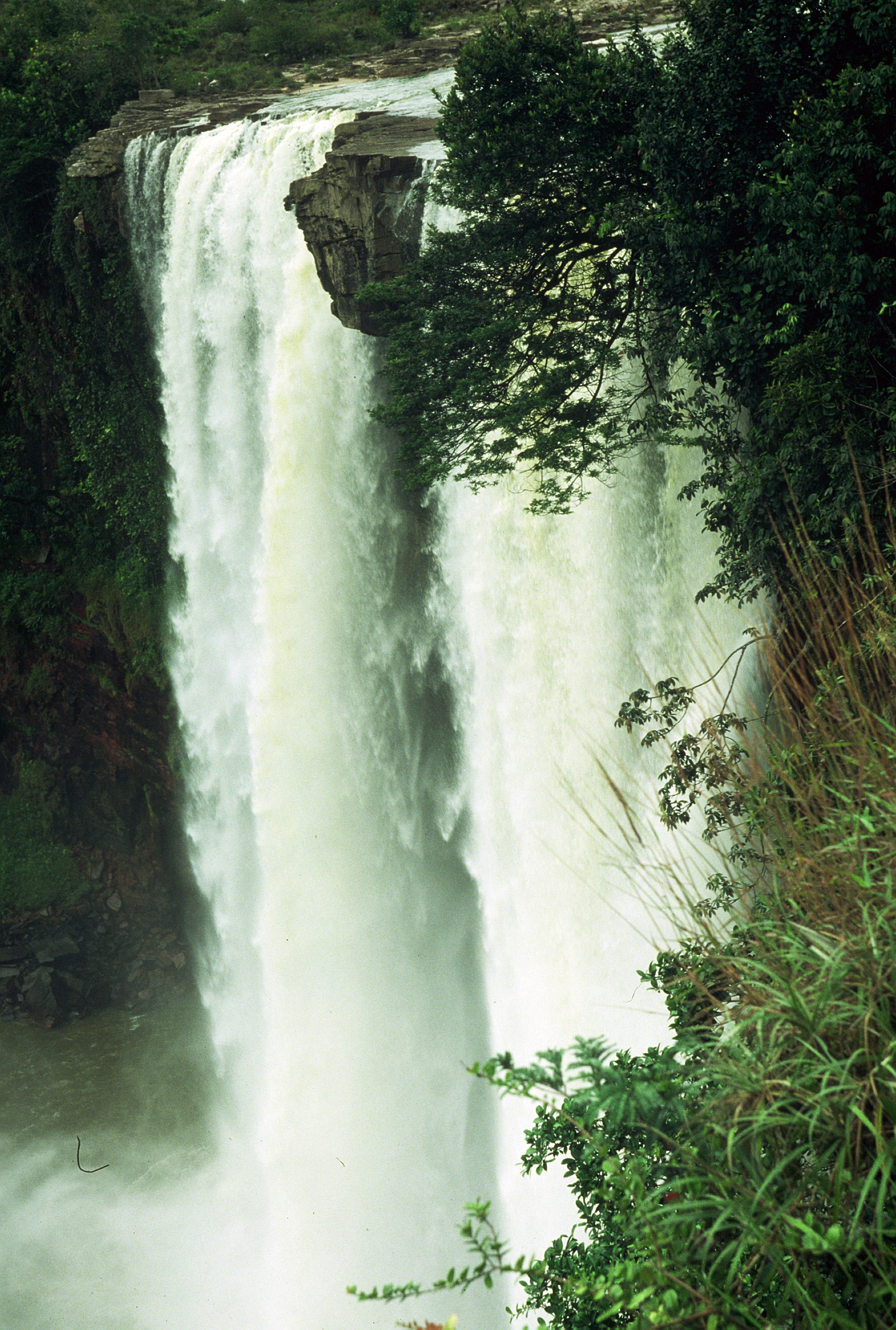
Kamá Falls

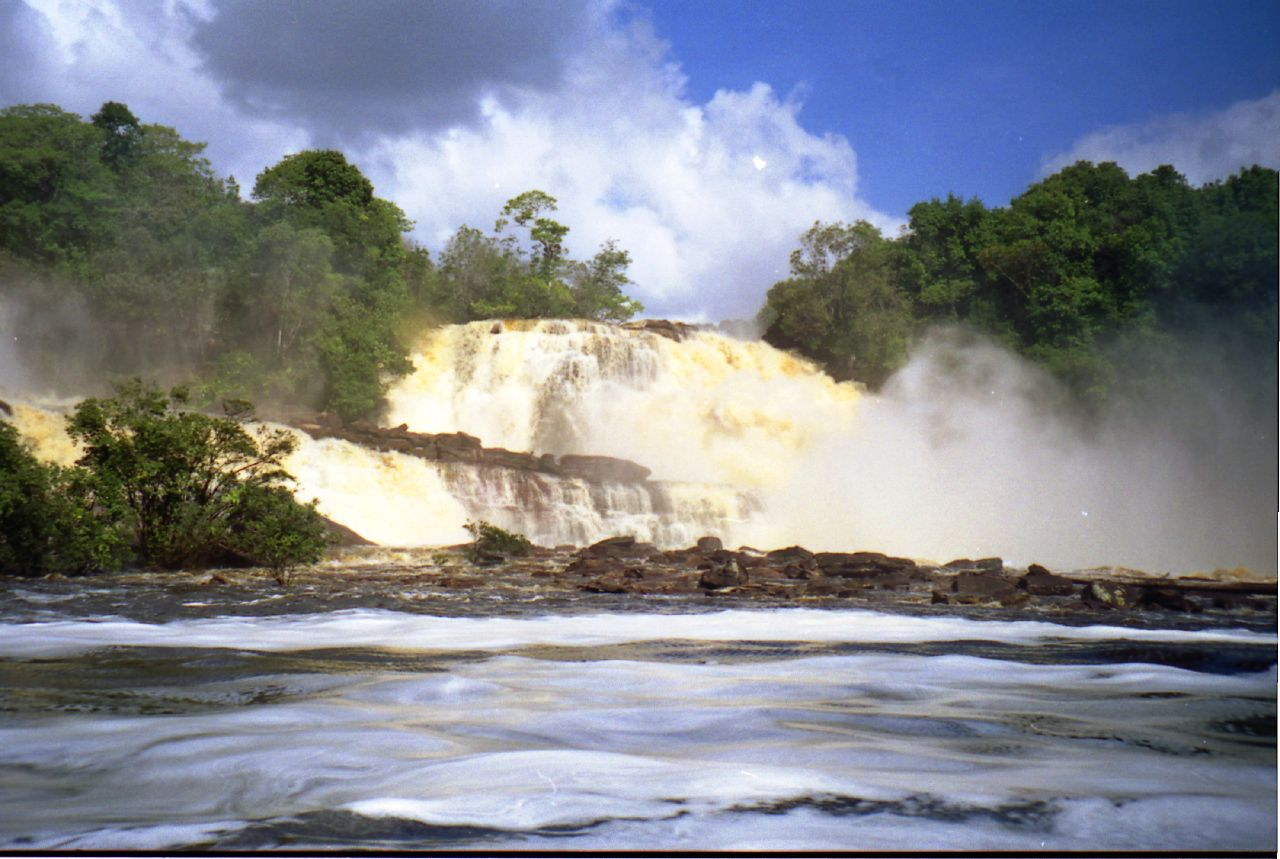
Waterfalls of Canaima

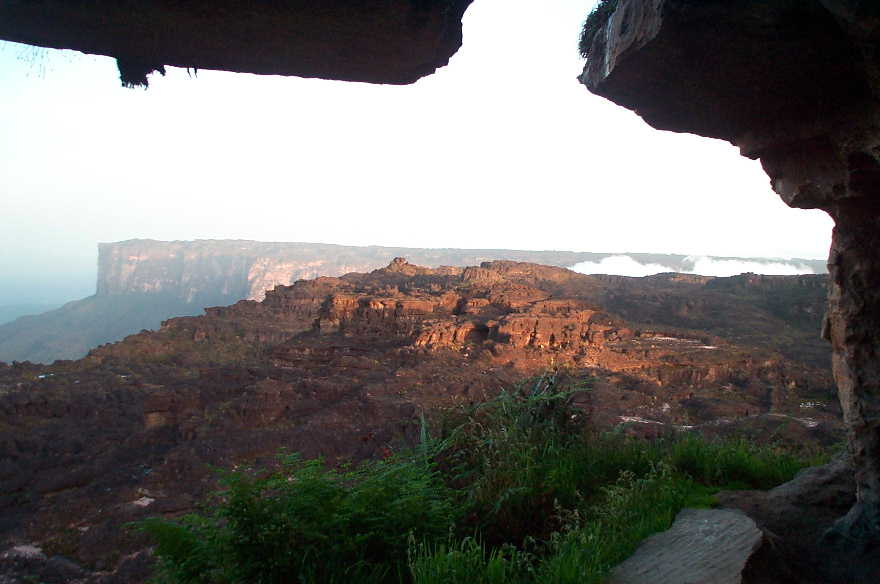
Kukenan Tepui

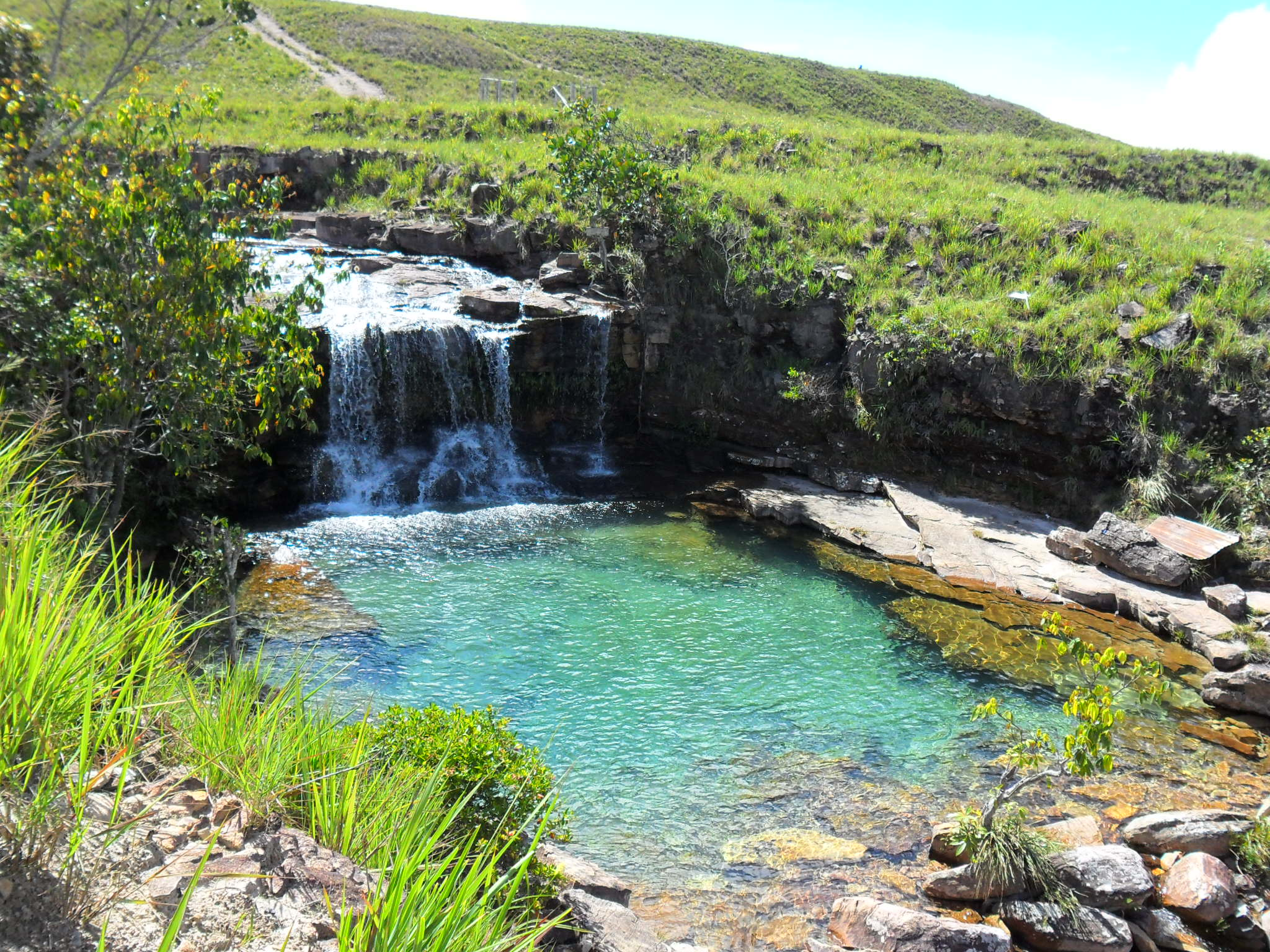
Pozo Azul

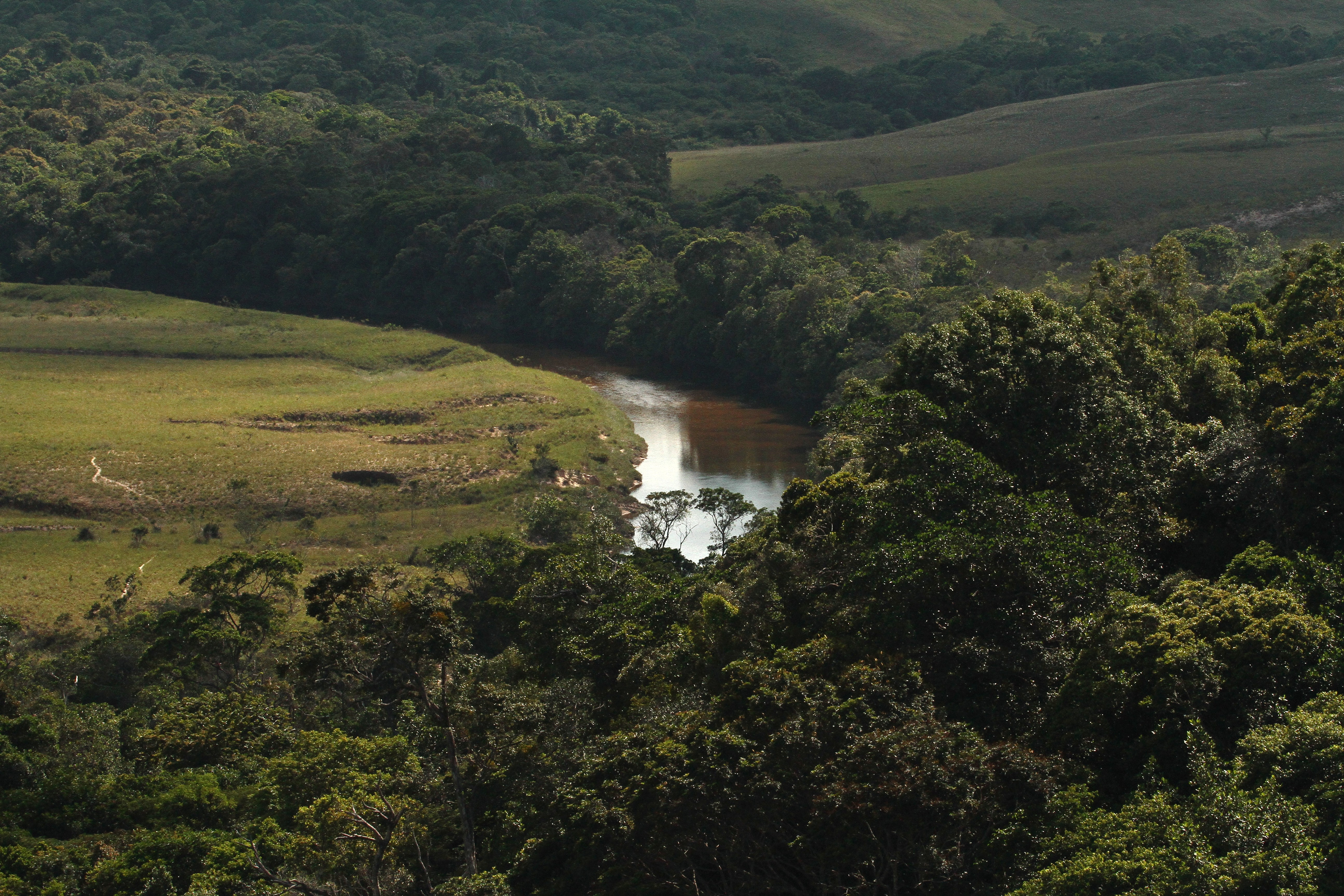
River in the Gran Sabana

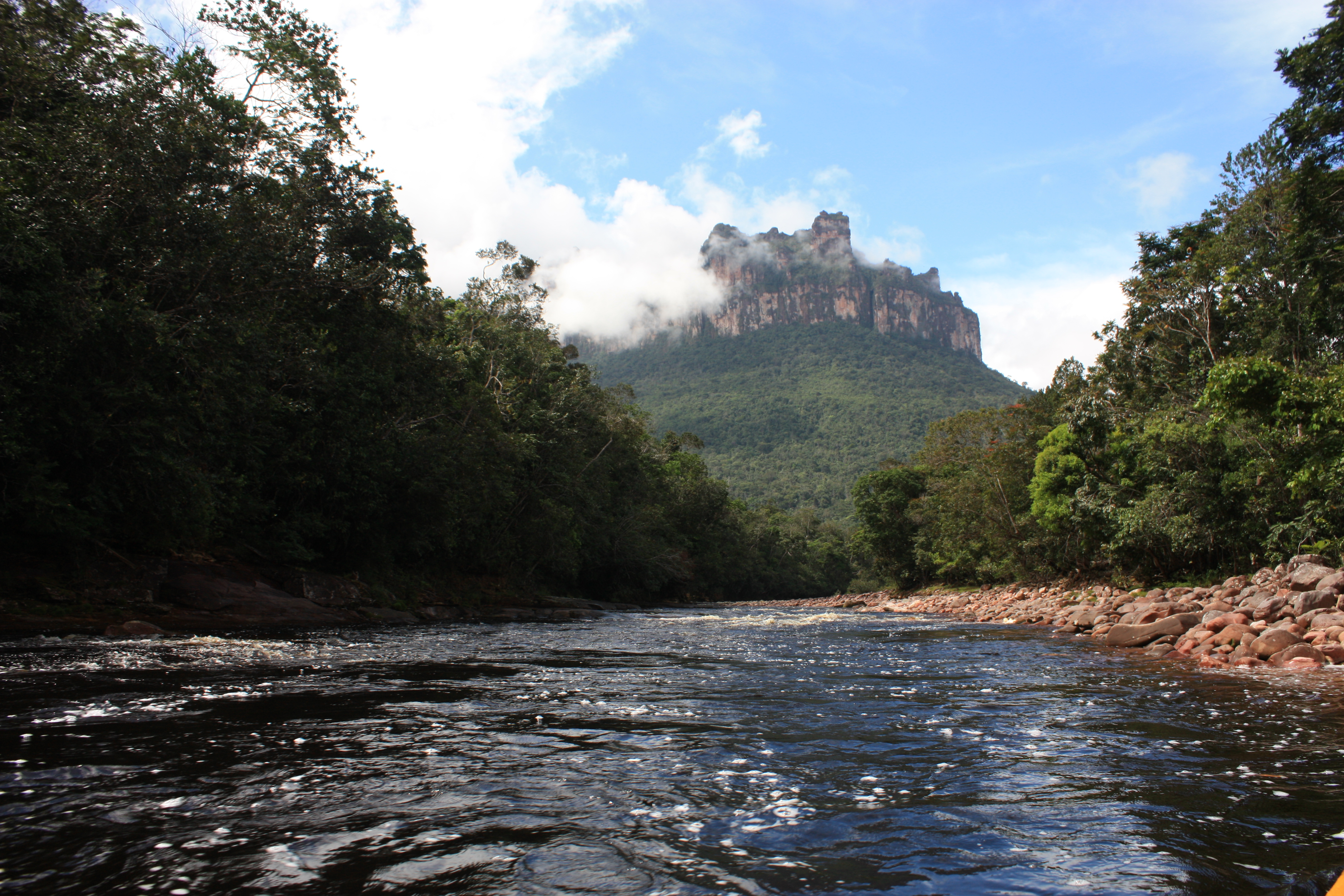
Churun River

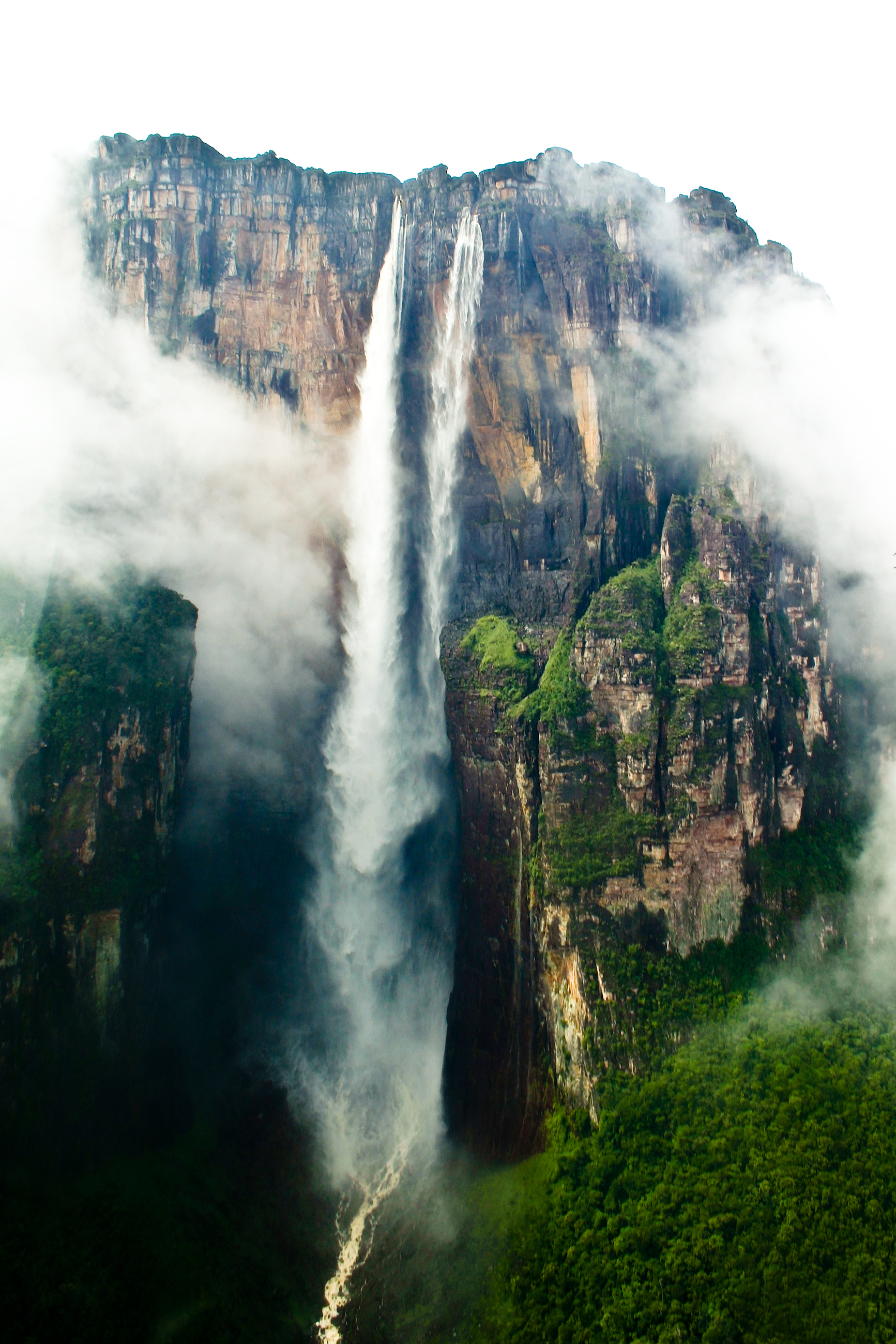
Salto Angel aerial view

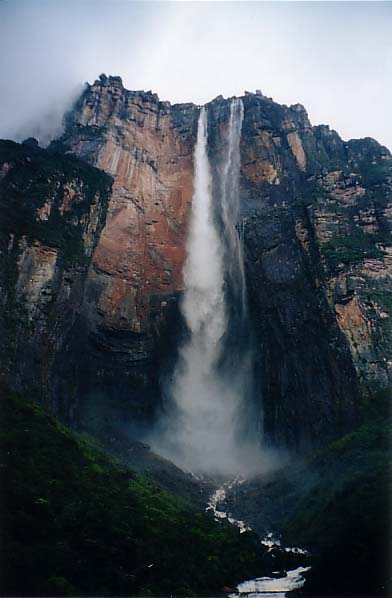
Angel Falls as seen from base

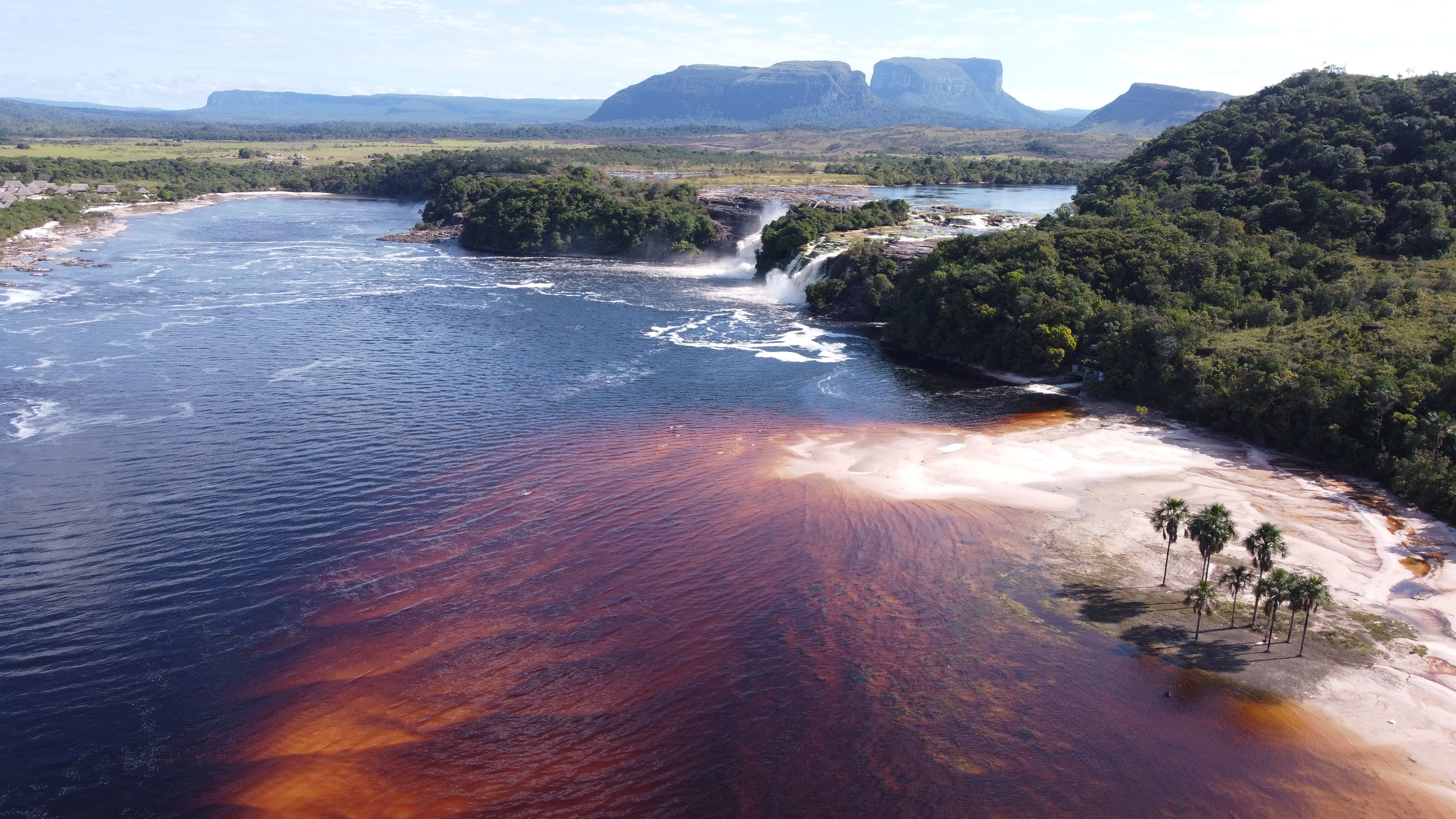
Canaima Lake and Ucaima Waterfalls

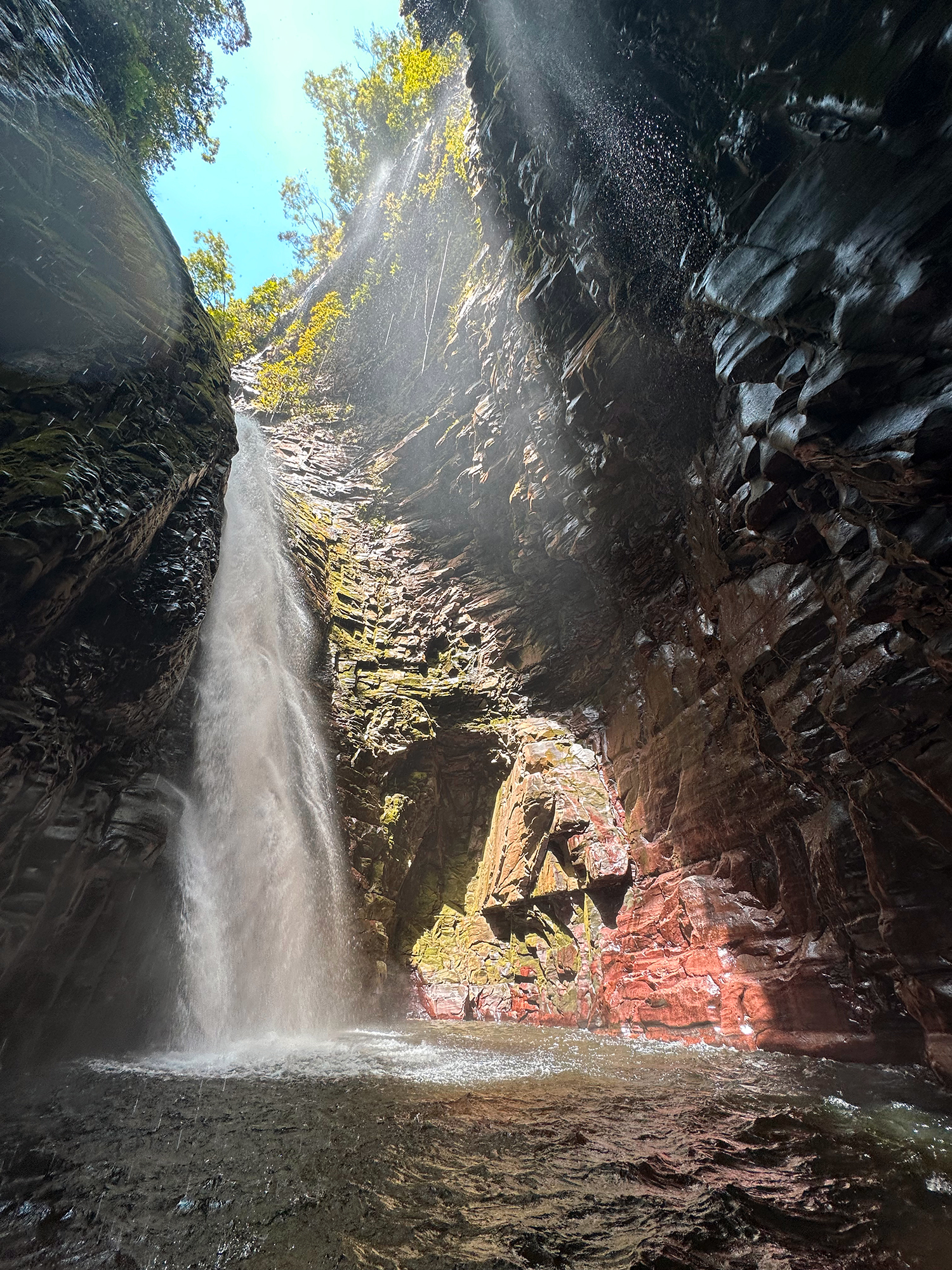
Kavac caves

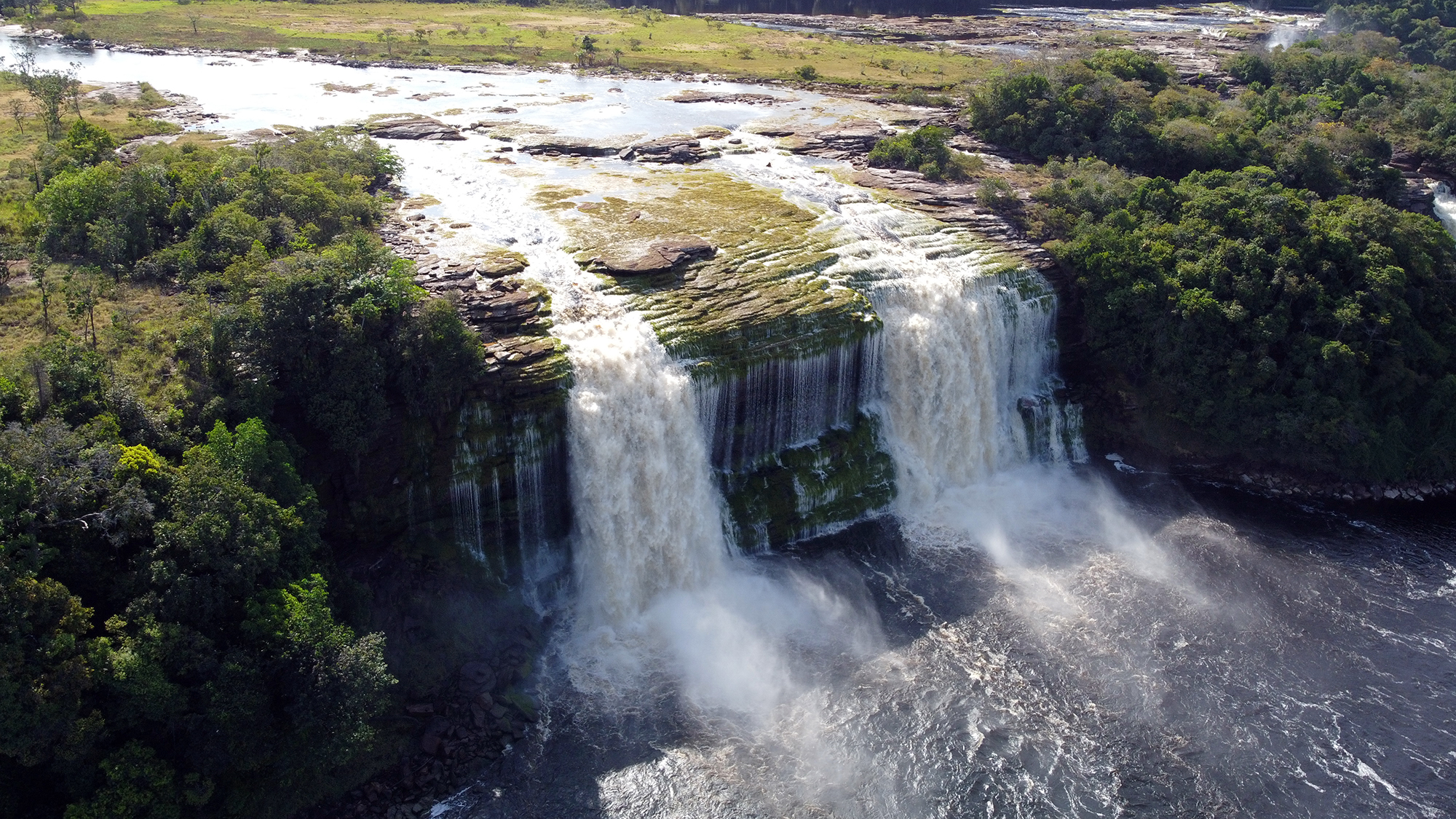
El Hacha falls

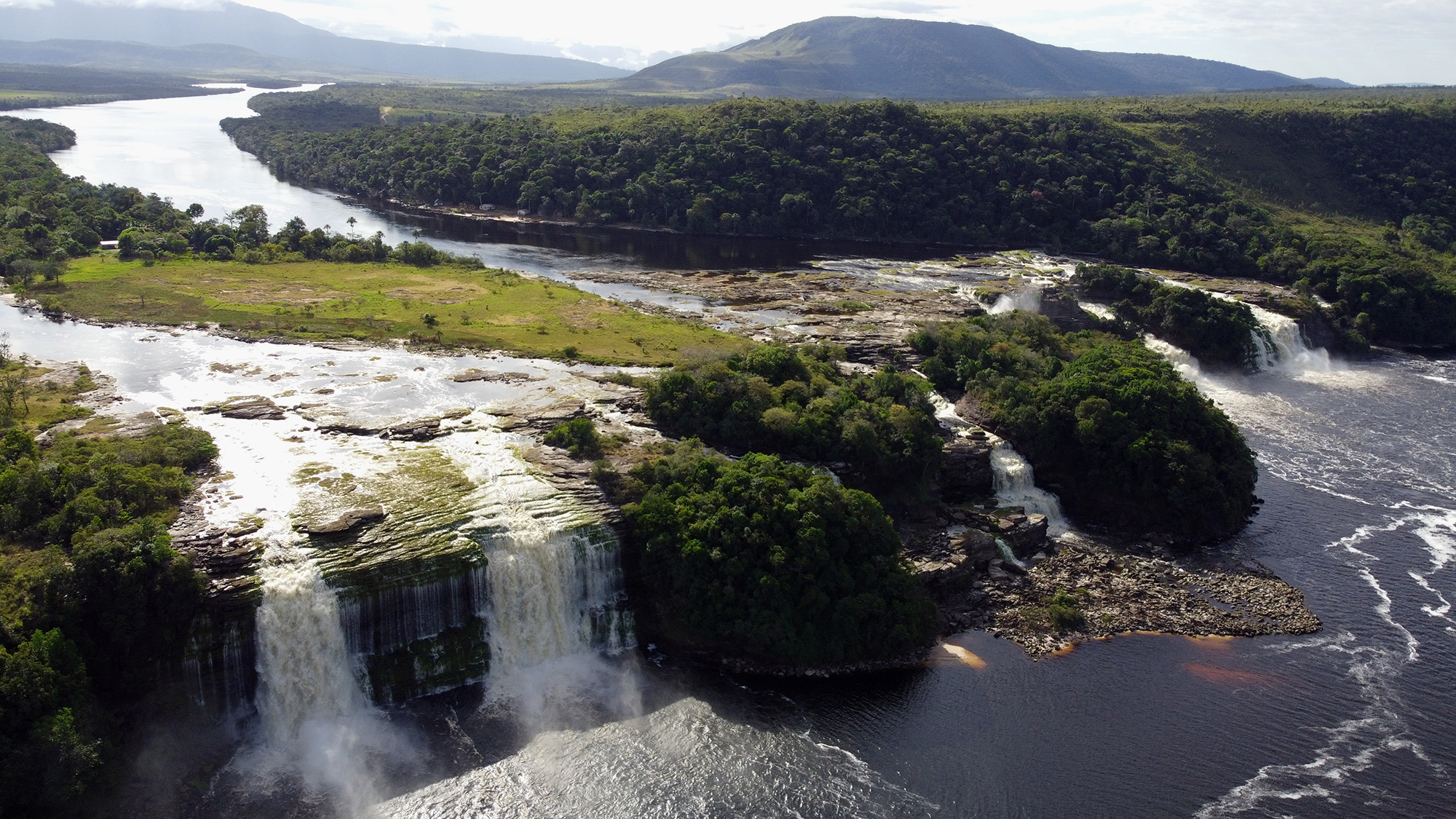
El Hacha and Ucaima falls. Carrao river and Canaima Lagoon

== See also ==
- La Gran Sabana
