= Yuruaní-tepui =

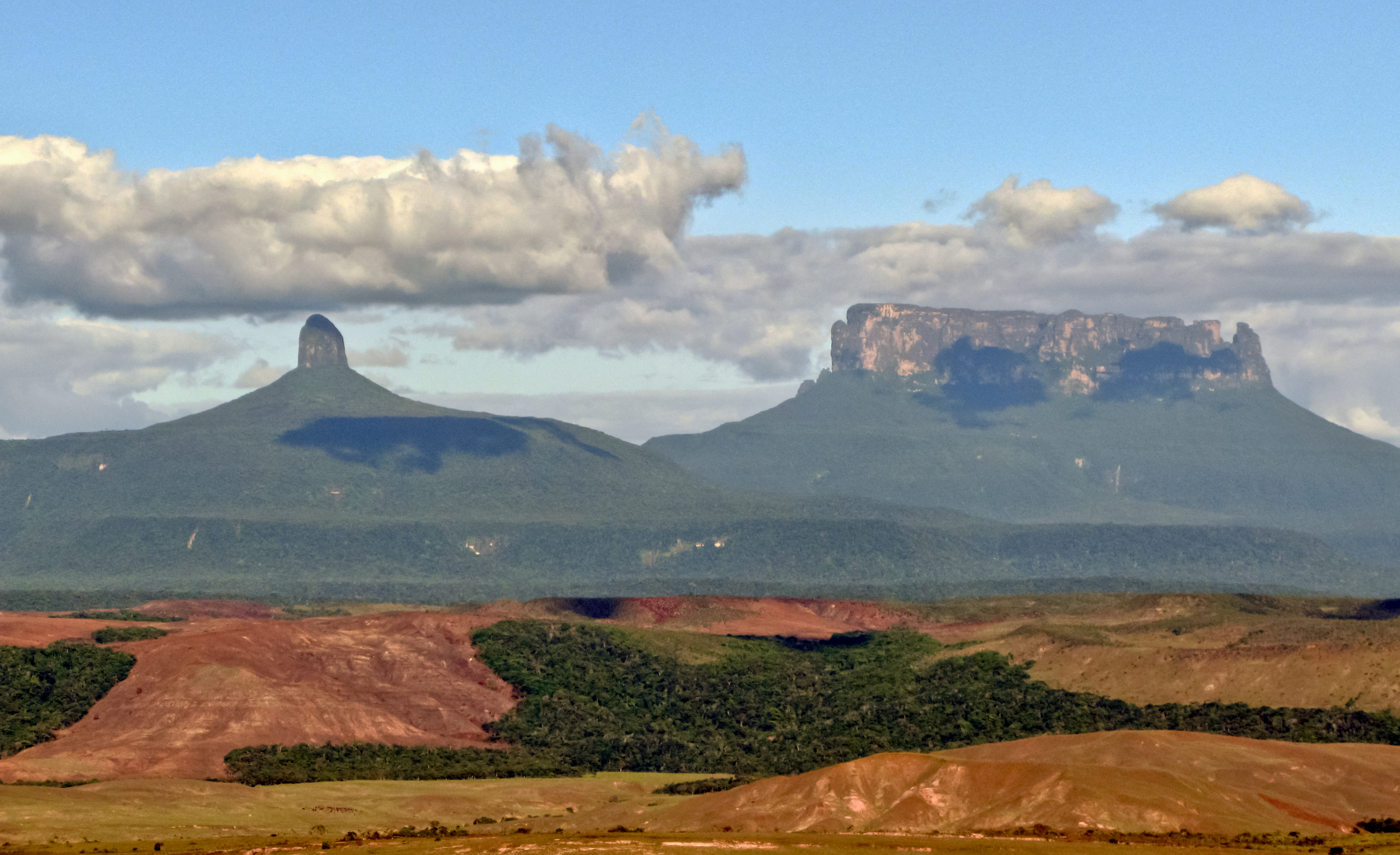
- Yuruaní-tepui (right) and Wadakapiapué-tepui

Highest point
- Elevation: 2,400 m (7,900 ft)
- Coordinates: 05°18′41″N 60°51′47″W

Geography
- Location within Venezuela
- Location: Cuyuni-Mazaruni, Guyana / Bolívar, Venezuela

Yuruaní-tepui, also known by the Pemón name Iwalkarima, Iwalecalima or Iwarkárima, is a tepui of the Eastern Tepuis chain primarily situated in Venezuela, while part of the eastern ridge stretches across the border with Guyana and into the contested Essequibo region. It has an elevation of around 2,400 metres (7,900 ft), the high plateau being located entirely within Venezuela, and a summit area of 4.38 km^{2} (1.69 sq mi). It lies just east of the much smaller Wadakapiapué-tepui. This Tepui is not located in the Canaima National Park unlike most other Tepuis in the area.

== See also ==
- Distribution of Heliamphora
