= Jasper Creek (Venezuela) =

River in Venezuela

Coordinates: 4.9171°N 61.0936°W

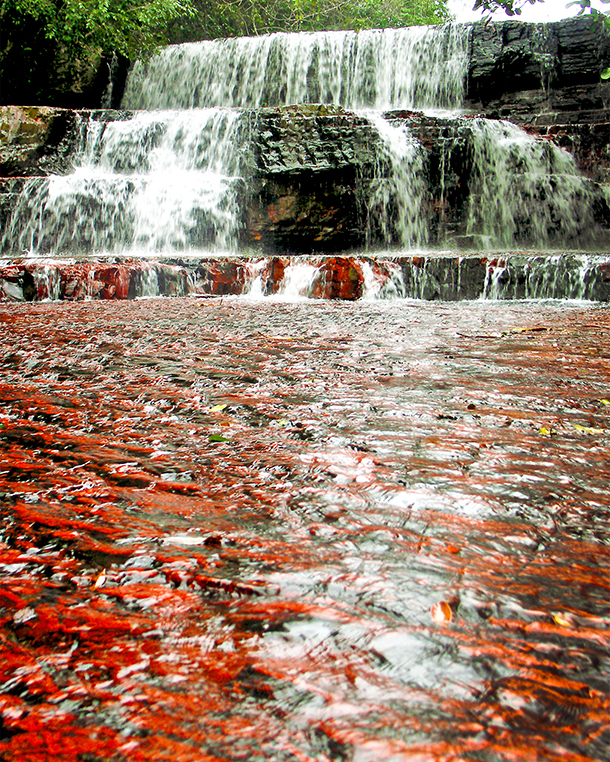
View of the river and its waterfalls

Jasper Creek (Spanish: Quebrada de Jaspe; in the local Pemon language Kako Parú) is the name of a river and a series of cascades and waterfalls in Venezuela. The name jasper is derived from the fact that the water flows over a smooth bedrock of mostly red and black jasper.

The river is located in the Gran Sabana Municipality of Bolívar State, Venezuelan Guayana. They can be reached from the town of Santa Elena de Uairén.

== Conservation status ==
This is a natural monument in the eastern sector of Canaima National Park protected by law.

== See also ==
- Gran Sabana
