= Karaurín-tepui =

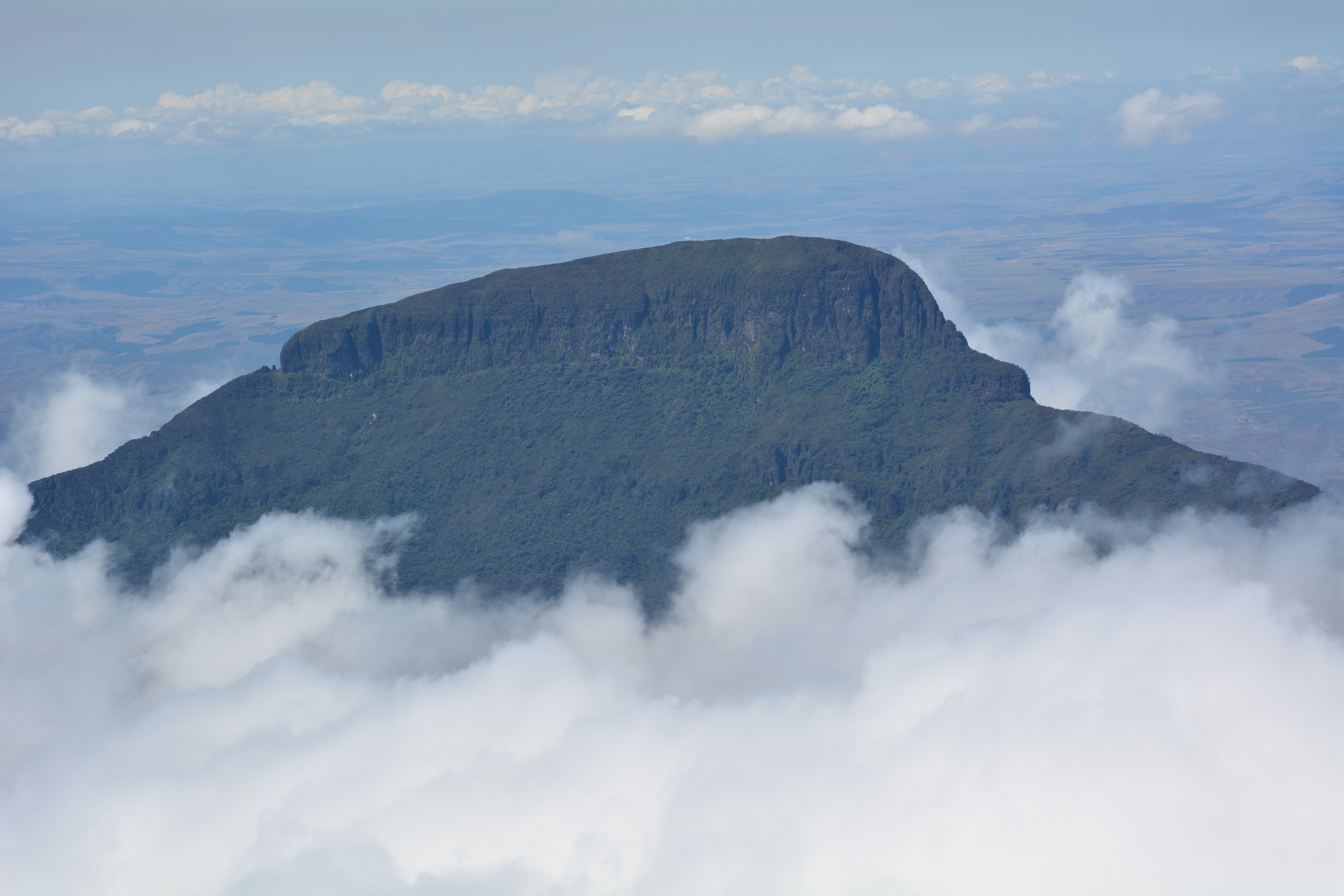
- Eastern face of Karaurín as seen from a helicopter

Highest point
- Elevation: 2,500 m (8,200 ft)
- Coordinates: 05°21′28″N 61°00′18″W

Geography
- Location within Venezuela
- Location: Bolívar, Venezuela

Karaurín-tepui, also spelled Caraurín, is a tepui of the Eastern Tepuis chain in Bolívar state, Venezuela, just along the border with neighboring Guyana. It has a maximum elevation of around 2,500 metres (8,200 ft) above sea level. The summit plateau is covered by shrubby vegetation and has an area of 1.88 km^{2} (0.73 sq mi). The foothills of the tepui are covered in forests. Karaurín-tepui lies just south of the much larger Ilú–Tramen Massif.

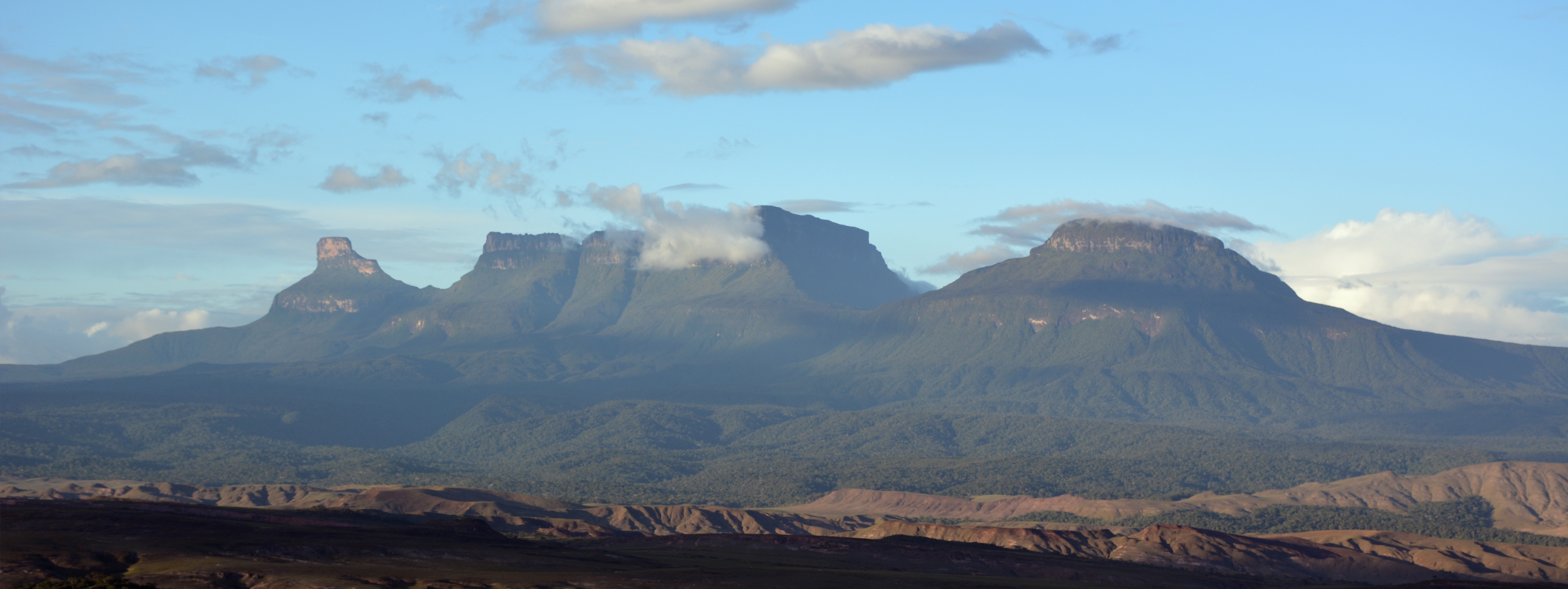
Western side of the Ilú–Tramen Massif (left and centre) and Karaurín-tepui (right) as seen from the Gran Sabana

== See also ==
- Distribution of Heliamphora
