= Eastern Tepuis =

Mountain chain in Guyana, Venezuela and Brazil

Eastern Tepuis (Roraima–Ilú range)
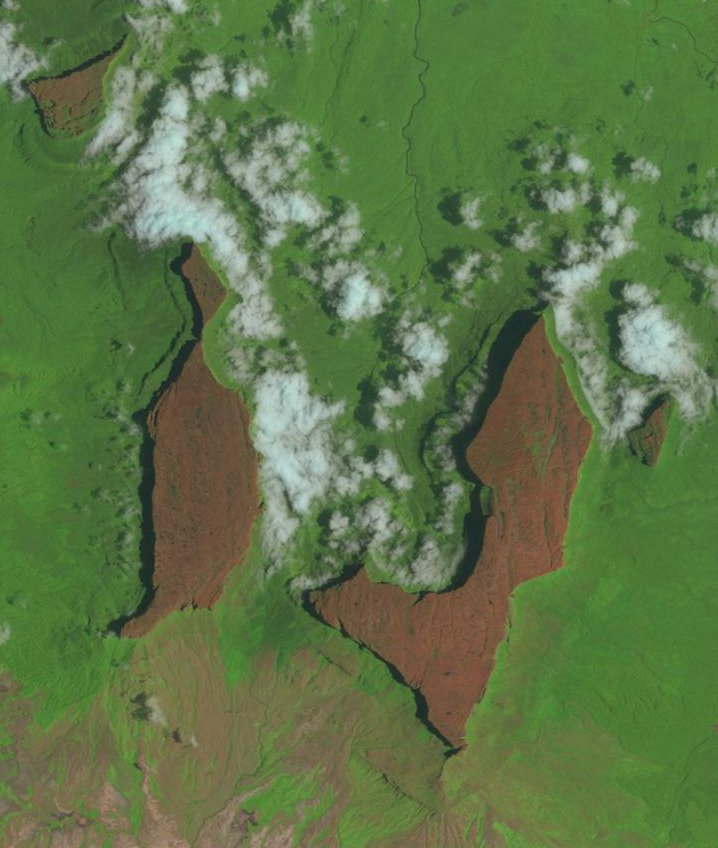
- Landsat image of the southern part of the Eastern Tepuis. The two large central plateaus are Kukenán-tepui (left) and Roraima-tepui. Wei-Assipu-tepui is the small peak to the northeast of Roraima, and Yuruaní-tepui is visible in the top left of the frame.

Highest point
- Peak: Roraima-tepui
- Elevation: 2,810 m (9,220 ft)

Geography
- Location within Venezuela Location within Brazil Location within Guyana
- Location: Roraima, Brazil / Cuyuni-Mazaruni, Guyana / Bolívar, Venezuela
- Range coordinates: 05°15′N 60°50′W

The Eastern Tepuis (Spanish: Tepuyes Orientales), also known as the Roraima–Ilú range, is a mountain chain stretching for some 60 kilometres (37 mi) along the border between Guyana, Venezuela and, to a small extent, Brazil. It runs in a northwesterly direction from the tripoint of these countries, closely following the Guyana–Venezuela border, with a single major peak (Uei-tepui) to the south, on the Brazil–Venezuela border. Moving northwest from Uei-tepui (2,150 m), the main summits of this chain are Roraima-tepui (2,810 m), Kukenán-tepui (2,650 m), Yuruaní-tepui (2,400 m), Wadakapiapué-tepui (2,000 m), Karaurín-tepui (2,500 ), Ilú-tepui (2,700 m), and Tramen-tepui. The minor peak of Wei-Assipu-tepui lies entirely outside Venezuela, on the border between Brazil and Guyana. Additionally, there are a number of minor plateaus which form a chain between Uei-tepui and Roraima-tepui. Ilú- and Tramen-tepuis are often treated together since they are joined by a common base.

The Eastern Tepuis chain has a total summit area of about 70 km^{2} (27 sq mi) and an estimated slope area of 320 km^{2} (120 sq mi). It includes some of the best known and most widely visited tepuis, particularly Roraima and nearby Kukenán.

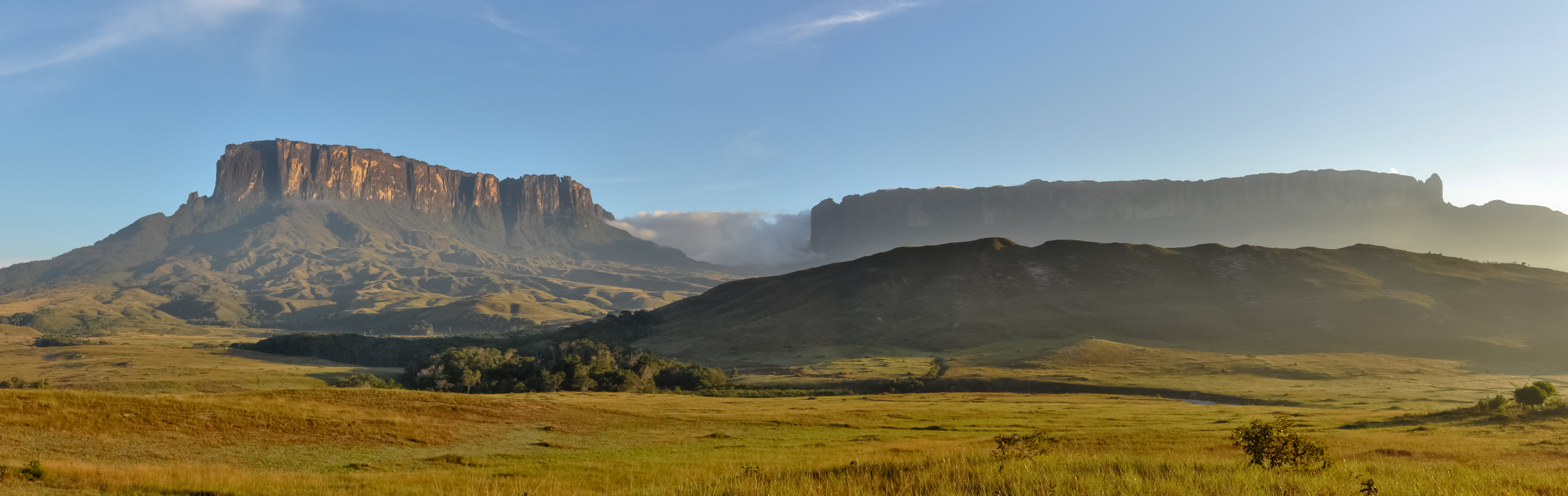
Kukenán-tepui (left) and Roraima-tepui, the two most visited of the Eastern Tepuis. The Tëk River and the relatively dry grasslands of the Gran Sabana are visible in the foreground.

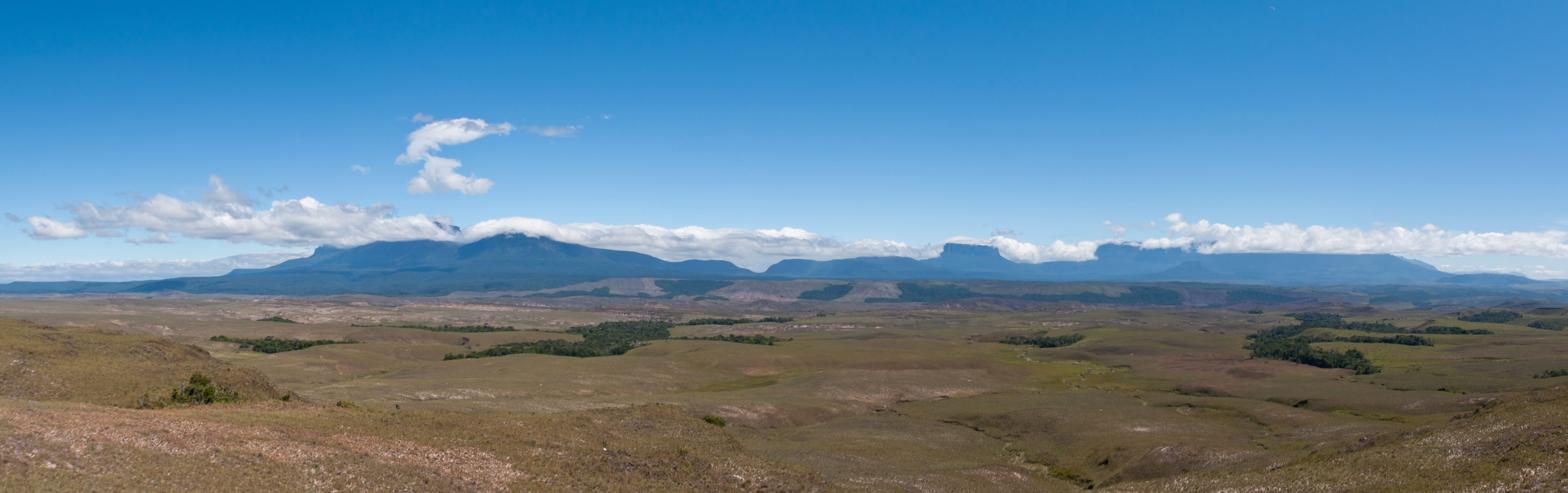
Panoramic view of the Eastern Tepuis chain. From left to right: Tramen-tepui, Ilú-tepui, Karaurín-tepui, Wadakapiapué-tepui (obscured by clouds), Yuruaní-tepui, Kukenán-tepui, and Roraima-tepui (obscured by Kukenán and clouds).

== See also ==
- Distribution of Heliamphora
