= Wadakapiapué-tepui =

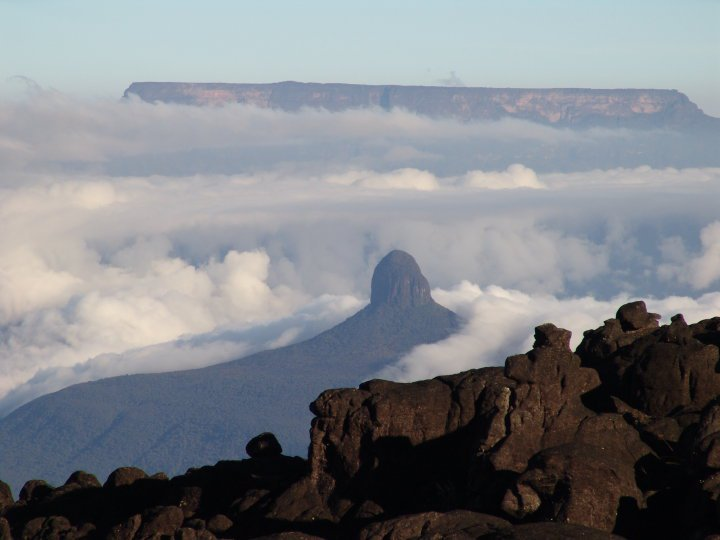
- Wadakapiapué-tepui as seen from Kukenán-tepui, with Ilú-tepui in the background

Highest point
- Elevation: 2,000 m (6,600 ft)
- Coordinates: 05°18′59″N 60°55′23″W

Geography
- Location within Venezuela
- Location: Bolívar, Venezuela

Wadakapiapué-tepui, also spelled Wadakapiapö, Wadakapiapo, Wadaka Piapo or Guadacapiapui, is a tepui of the Eastern Tepuis chain in Bolívar, Venezuela. It has an elevation of around 2,000 metres (6,600 ft). Its tiny tower-like summit has an area of less than 0.01 km^{2} (0.0039 sq mi), making it the smallest member of the Eastern Tepuis. It lies just west of the much larger Yuruaní-tepui.

== See also ==
- Distribution of Heliamphora
