= Mallophyton =

Scientific classification
- Kingdom: Plantae
- Clade: Tracheophytes
- Clade: Angiosperms
- Clade: Eudicots
- Clade: Rosids
- Order: Myrtales
- Family: Melastomataceae
- Genus: Mallophyton; Wurdack

Genus of plants

Mallophyton is a genus of flowering plants belonging to the family Melastomataceae.

Its native range is Venezuela.

== Species ==
Species:

- Mallophyton chimantense Wurdack
