= Ilú–Tramen Massif =

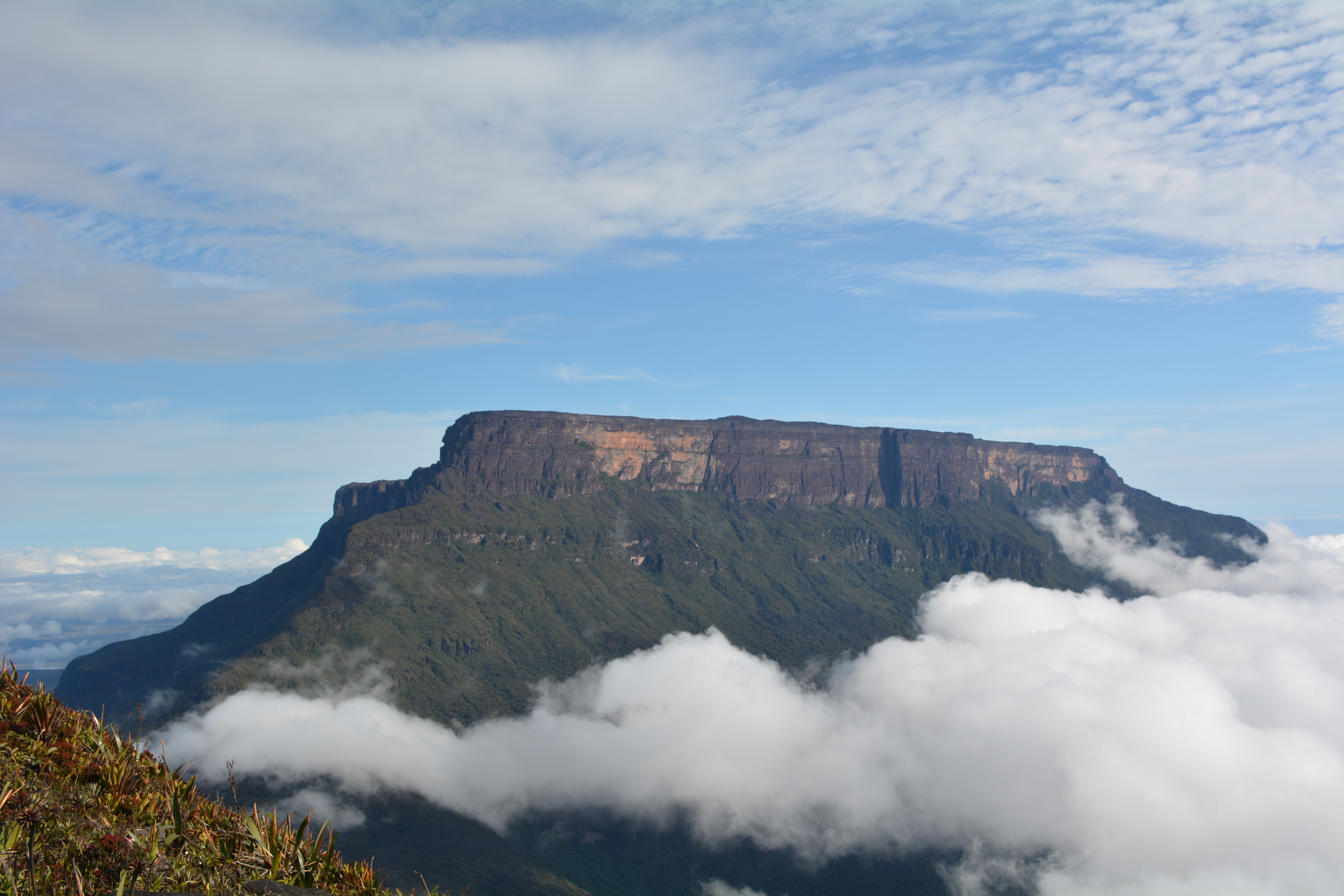
- Southeastern face of Ilú-tepui as seen from Karaurín-tepui

Highest point
- Elevation: 2,700 m (8,900 ft)
- Coordinates: 05°24′18″N 61°00′20″W

Geography
- Location within Venezuela
- Location: Bolívar, Venezuela
- Parent range: Eastern Tepuis

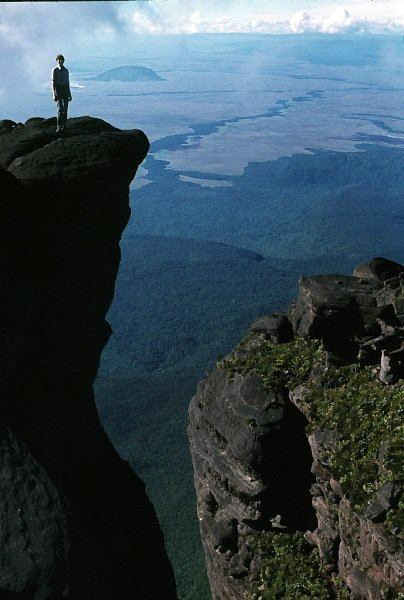
Summit Tramen Tepui 24 November 1981 Scharlie next to huge chasm on west face of Tramen Tepui

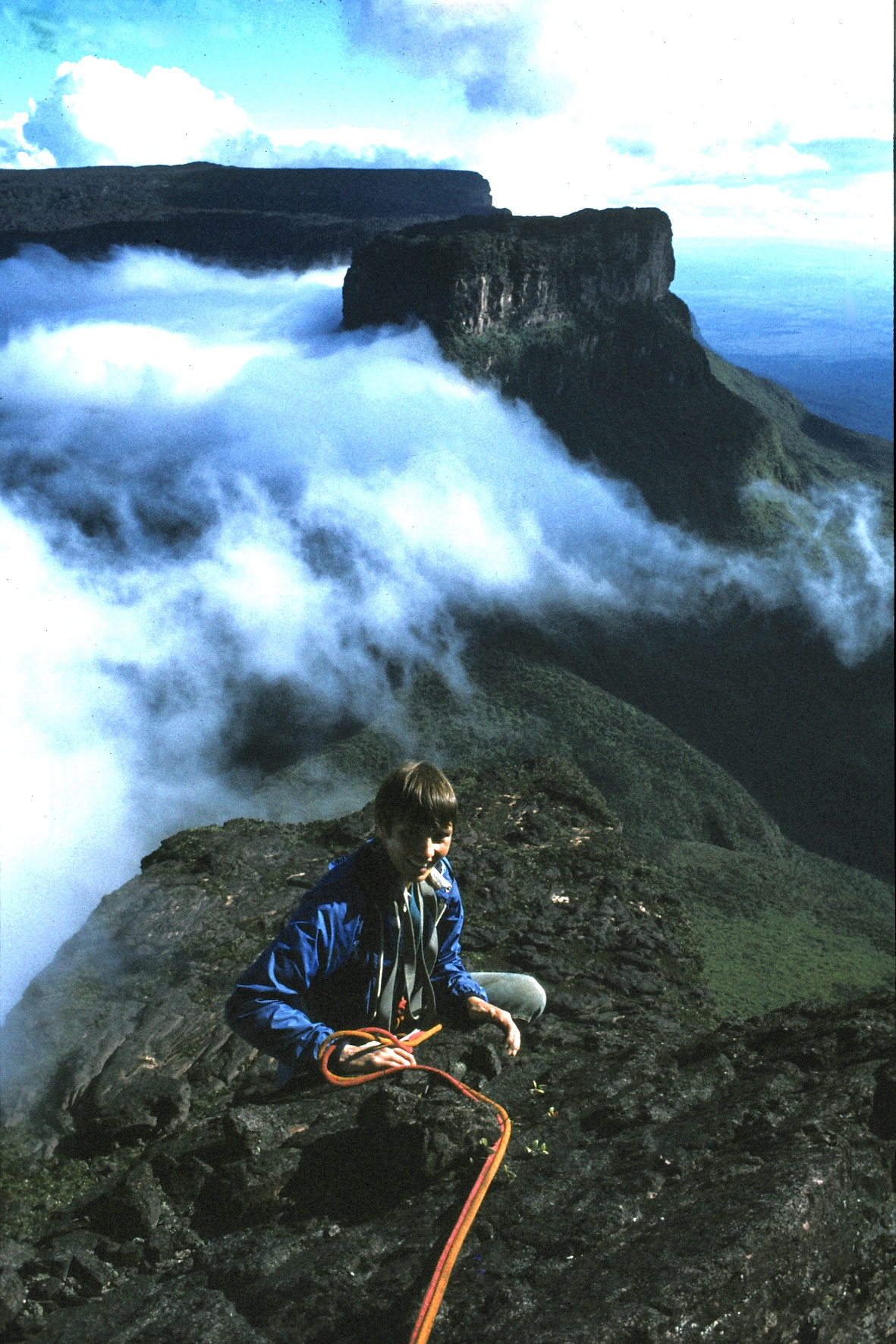
Scharlie Wraight reaching the summit of Tramen Tepui

The Ilú–Tramen Massif is a tepui massif in Bolívar state, Venezuela. It is the northernmost member of the Eastern Tepuis chain and comprises two major plateaus: the larger Ilú-tepui (also spelled Uru) to the south and Tramen-tepui to the north, all close to the border with neighboring Guyana. With a maximum elevation of around 2,700 metres (8,900 ft), Ilú-tepui is the taller of the two peaks. Both tepuis have open, rocky summit plateaus, with a combined summit area of 5.63 km^{2} (2.17 sq mi). They lie just north of Karaurín-tepui.

Tramen-tepui, the left most tepuy in the photo below, was first climbed by Scharlie Wraight and Stephen Platt from the col between Ilú-tepui and Tramen-tepui on 24 November 1981.

== Nomenclatural confusion ==
There is some confusion about the name of the mountains in the Ilu-Tramen Massif. Some of the local Pemón Arekuna Amerindians call the most northerly tower Iru or Ilu, while maps show the three mountains from north to south as Tramen, Ilu and Kerauren Tepuy.

However, maps prepared by Emilio Pérez and others including, the Diccionario Geografico del Estado Bolivar, the Cartografia Nacional 1999 as well as Flora of the Venezuelan Guayana name the mountain Tramen-tepui.

Emilio Pérez, a Venezuelan cartographer and mapmaker writes – Ilu Tepui and Karaurin Tepui is a massif of three summits, the most northerly of which is a high pinnacle or tower commonly referred as Tramen Tepui. However, the first map of the area showing the Ilu Tepui toponym was the one drawn by Robert Schomburgk on his 1838 exploration and published in 1842 in which Tramen Tepui appears under the name of IruTupu. Between 1900 and 1905 the United States government produced a series of maps based on the Schomburgk maps for the Venezuela-British Guyana Differendum that also shown Ilu Tepui and do not mention Tramen Tepui.

The 1938 Levantamiento de información geográfica de la comisión de la Gran Sabana (varios mapas) shows Tramen Tepui for first time and the American Geographical Society of USA (1940) map shows Tramen Tepui marked north of Ilu Tepui. Since then the name Tramen Tepui appears on many CVG-EDELCA, Otto Huber, IGVSB and Emilio Pérez maps. Despite these publications, writes Emilio Pérez, the Pemon-Arekunas from the area nearby refuse to call this pinnacle Tramen, calling it Ilu (or Iru) Tepui, which is consistent with the Schomburgk naming it in 1838.

Currently in 2017, a team of Pemón led by Antonio Hitcher is trying to secure the traditional toponym expressed in Arekuna, Kamarakoto and Taurepan. According to Antonio Hitcher the most northerly mountain in the Ilu-Tramen Massif is called Iru (or Ilu) because it has the shape of the fishing basket women use to catch Iwore (a small fish of the genus Pyrrhulina) that the Pemon stun with barbascos, a poisonous plant compound. In Pemon, Iruk (Ilu) is a basket, Türamen (Tramen) is the house of the spirits of the ancestors and Karaürin (Kerauren) is the tree of the family guanabana that is used to tighten the guayares and other basket weavings.

== History of exploration ==
Previous expeditions to the Ilu-Tramen Massif include those of Basset Maguire, botanist and Director of the New York Botanical Garden, in the early 1950s and Guyana mountaineer, Adrian Thompson. Both reached the col between Ilu and Tramen Tepui. Various YouTube videos from 2007 and 2008 show groups at the base of the mountain prospecting a route. These all call the mountain Ilu Tepuy. Robin Colson (2011), however, in his book Beyond Ilu Tepuy, calls the northerly tower Tramen Tepuy and the larger mass to the south Ilu Tepuy.

A record by Stephen Platt and Scharlie Wright from their expedition in 1981 describe the first successful attempt of summiting Tramen-tepui (referred to as Ilu-tepui by the author).

In 1987 and 1988 expeditions to the upper valley conjoining Ilu-tepui and Tramen-tepui slopes were organized by teams of American and German botanists, with the main aim of studying Heliamphora ionasi populations in-situ. Numerous helicopter expeditions were organized to various areas of the plateaus in the 1990s, 2000s and 2010s.

The second confirmed ascent of Tramen-tepui was made on 14 February 2012 by a Polish-Venezuelan expedition under the auspices of National Geographic Poland. The climbing party comprised Polish photographer Marek Arcimowicz and Venezuelan climbers Alberto Raho and Mario Osorio. The expedition was led by Michał Kochańczyk, and accompanied by biologist Izabela Stachowicz, a biology graduate from the Jagiellonian University. Two new species of butterflies and a new species of toad were discovered as a result of this expedition.

== Account of Stephen Platt's ascent ==
In all Stephen Platt and Scharlie Wraight spent four weeks climbing Tramen Tepui. They failed on their first attempt in heavy rain trying to climb the west face directly below the huge chasm that splits the upper wall. They returned two weeks later and reached the summit on 24 November 1981.

At Uroy Uray they contracted a Pemon guide called José Luis who guided them to Uarpa. From there Pemon Indians Cecilio and Feliciano joined them and it took four days to traverse right to the col between Tramen and Ilu Tepui where the Indians left them.

On the 24 November they left their tent at dawn and climbed the steep vegetated talus slope to the first steep step. A difficult move up a steep vegetated corner led to a belay ledge below the plateau. They crossed the half-mile rock platform, leaving stone cairns and upturned pitcher plants every few metres to mark the route in case the swirling cloud descended. They skirted a rock pinnacle barring access to the upper wall and decided there might be time to reach the summit in one push.

They began climbing in the middle of the upper wall at an obvious niche. There followed two hard pitches. The first was a steep black slab without positive holds that led via a flake to a wide ledge and chock stone belay (Sport Grade 6b; UIAA Grade VII). The second pitch followed a crack line to a small pinnacle and then traversed up rightwards on wrinkled slabs to a grass ledge and a block pinnacle belay at the bottom of a steep chimney (Sport Grade 6b+; UIAA VII+). The third pitch led straight up the chimney where a chock stone at half height was the only good runner on the whole route. An easy wall, a gully and a scramble led to the summit. They spent 2 hours exploring the summit, building stone cairns and leaving a note with their names and the date of their ascent under the most prominent cairn. They abseiled down and reached their tent as it was getting dark.

They travelled light, alpine style, using two 45m 9mm ropes and four long tape slings. They were able to do the climb in the one day because the weather was ideal and nothing had gone wrong. Had they waited a day they would have been faced by wet rock and poor conditions.

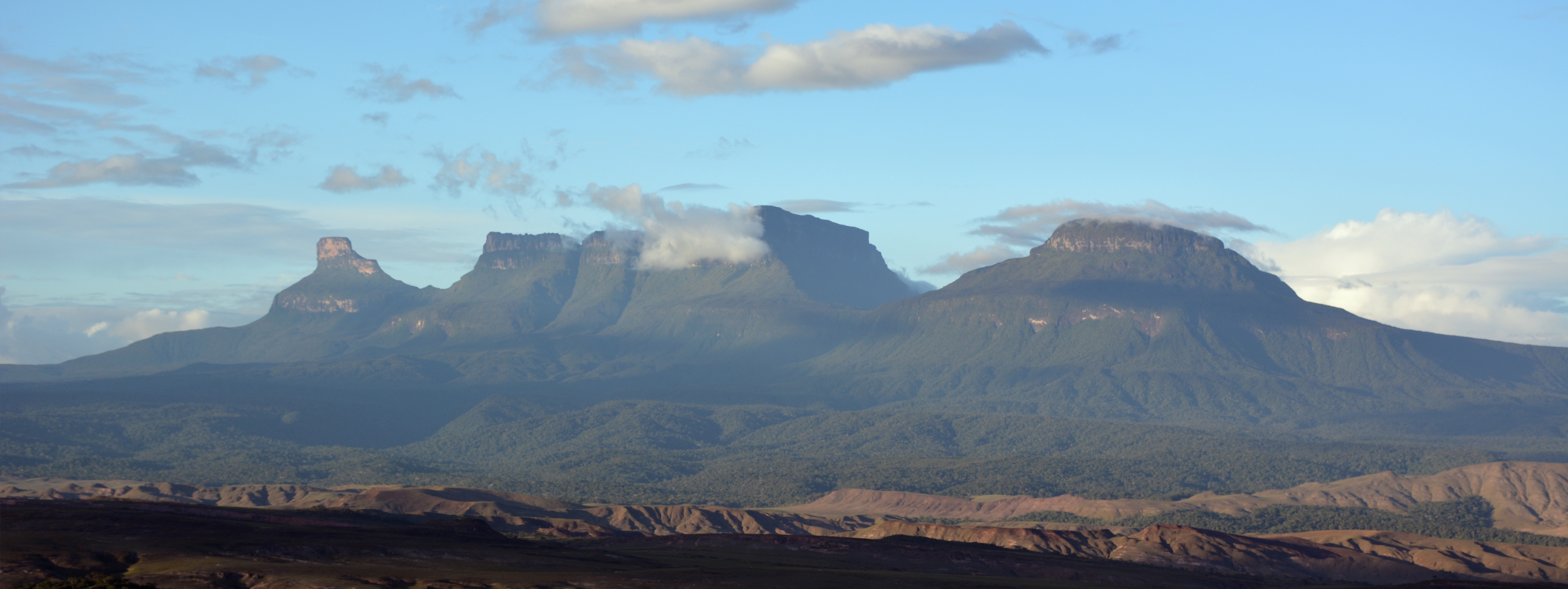
Western side of the Ilú–Tramen Massif (left and centre) and Karaurín-tepui (right) as seen from the Gran Sabana

== See also ==
- Distribution of Heliamphora
