= Solanum tepuiense =

Scientific classification
- Kingdom: Plantae
- Clade: Tracheophytes
- Clade: Angiosperms
- Clade: Eudicots
- Clade: Asterids
- Order: Solanales
- Family: Solanaceae
- Genus: Solanum
- Species: S. tepuiense

Binomial name
- Solanum tepuiense S. Knapp

Species of flowering plant

Solanum tepuiense is a plant species native to Venezuela. It is known from one collection, from a low-elevation sandstone flat-topped mountain named Sororopán-Tepuí, near the Gran Sabana Region in the State of Bolívar in the eastern part of the country.

Solanum tepuiense is a shrub up to 2.5 m tall. Leaves are elliptic, thick and leathery, green and shiny on the upper surface, a few small hairs on the underside; blade up to 14 cm long. Inflorescences are opposite the leaves, each with 10-14 flowers. Flowers are white, about 20 mm in diameter. Fruit is a dry berry about 1.5 cm in diameter. Seeds are reddish-brown, flattened and kidney-shaped.
