= Gran Sabana =

Region in southeastern Venezuela

Coordinates: 6°15′00″N 62°50′18″W

La Gran Sabana
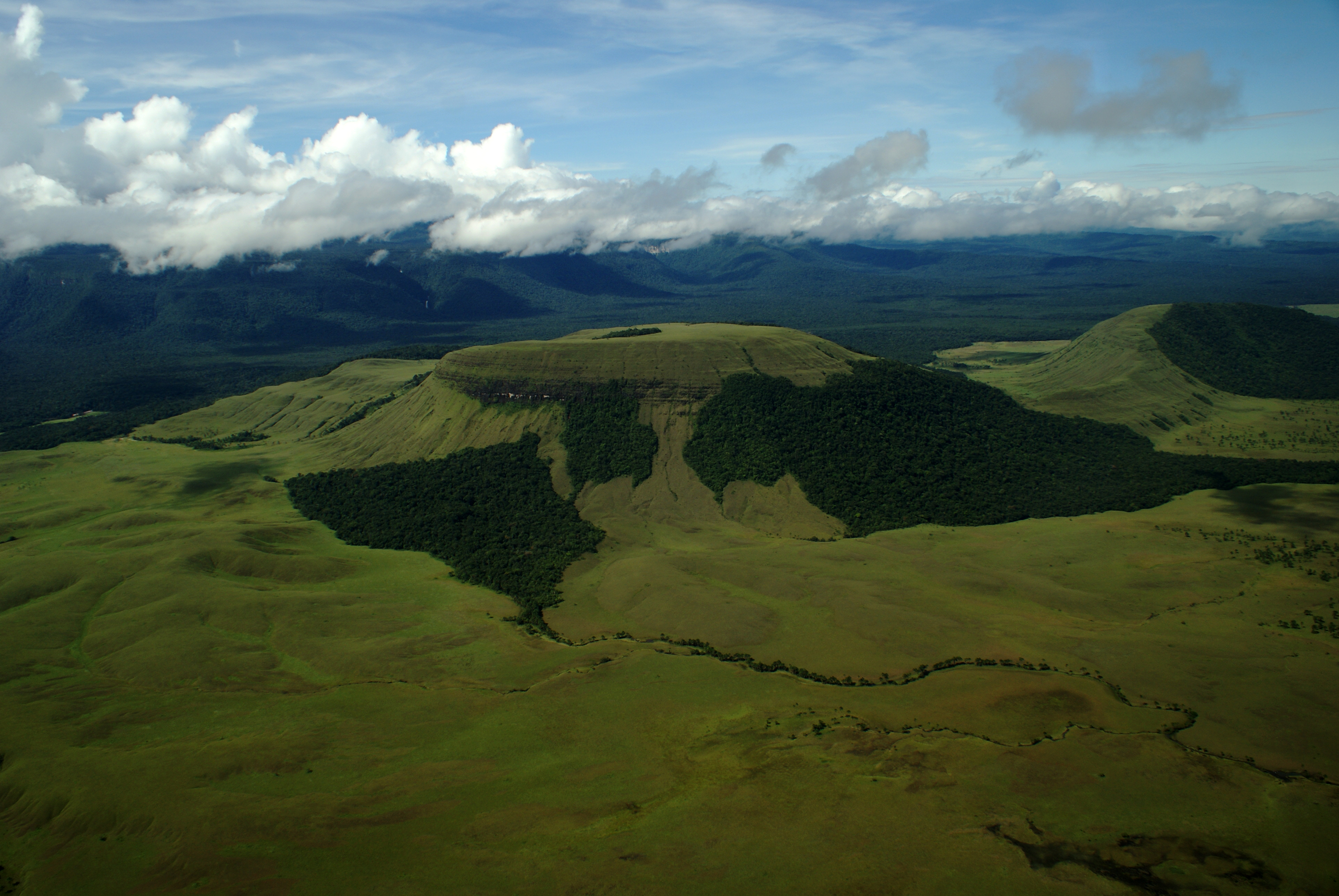
- Image of the Gran Sabana near Uonquén
- Interactive map of La Gran Sabana
- Location: Venezuela
- Nearest city: Santa Elena de Uairén
- Area: 1,082,000 ha (4,180 sq mi)
- Designation: National park
- Established: 12 June 1962

The Gran Sabana (Spanish pronunciation: [la ɣɾan saˈβana], English: The Great Savanna) is a region in southeastern Venezuela which is part of the Guianan savanna ecoregion. It extends into the Guiana Highlands and south-east into Bolívar State to the borders with Brazil and Guyana. The Gran Sabana has an area of 10,820 km^{2} (4,180 sq mi) and is part of Canaima National Park, Venezuela's second-largest national park; only Parima Tapirapecó National Park is larger than Canaima. The average temperature is around 20 °C (68 °F) and can drop to 13 °C (55 °F) at night or lower at higher elevations. The region includes rivers, waterfalls, gorges, deep valleys and jungles, and savannas hosting a number and variety of plant species, diverse fauna, and isolated table-top mesas locally known as tepuis.

== History ==
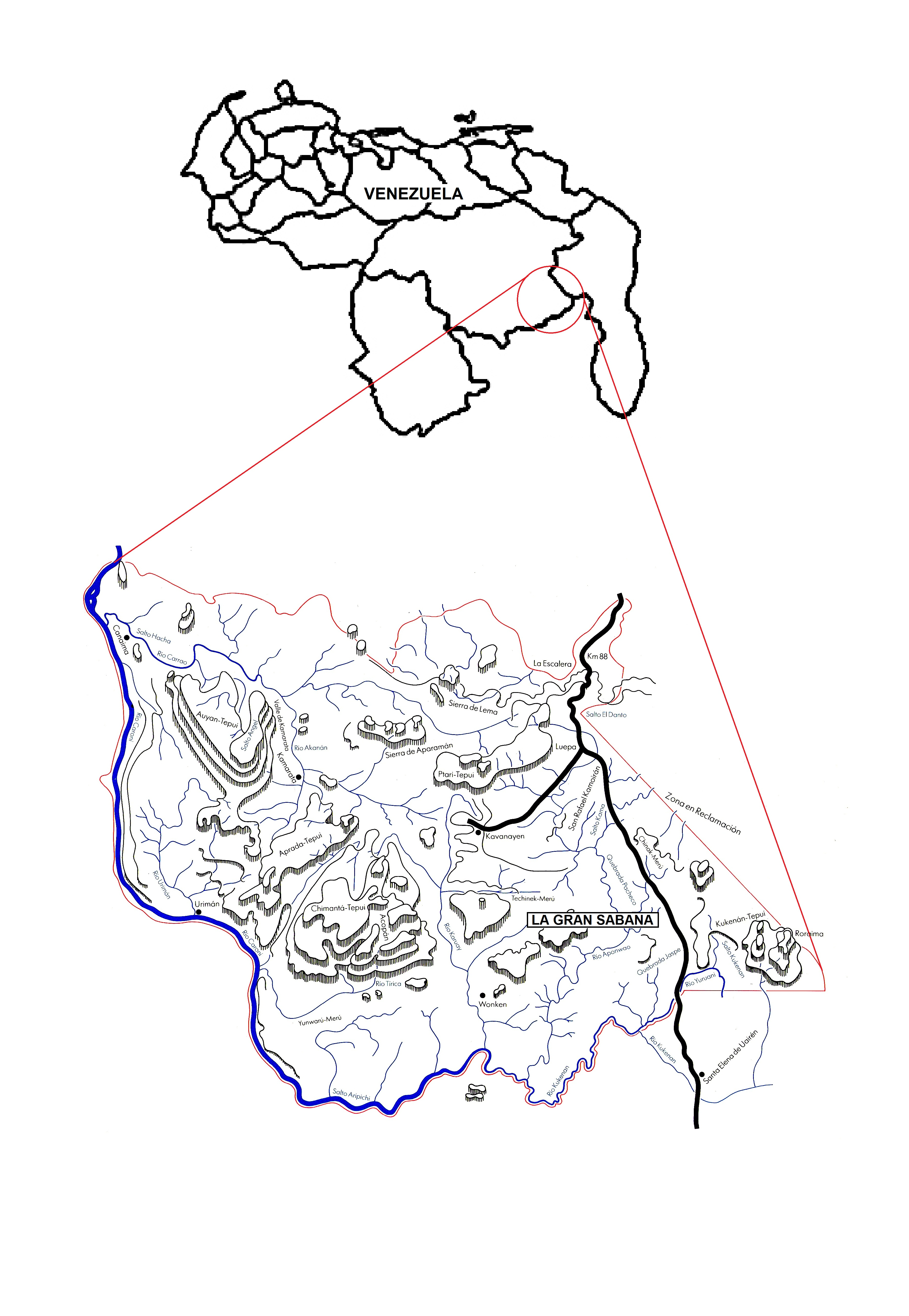
Map of Venezuela and the Gran Sabana

During the era of colonization in Venezuela, the territories of Guiana and its natural resources gave rise to the legend of El Dorado. This attracted the attention of adventurers, explorers and settlers who came in search of gold, gems, and other valuable products. The region still has several areas that few people have explored.

=== Park ===
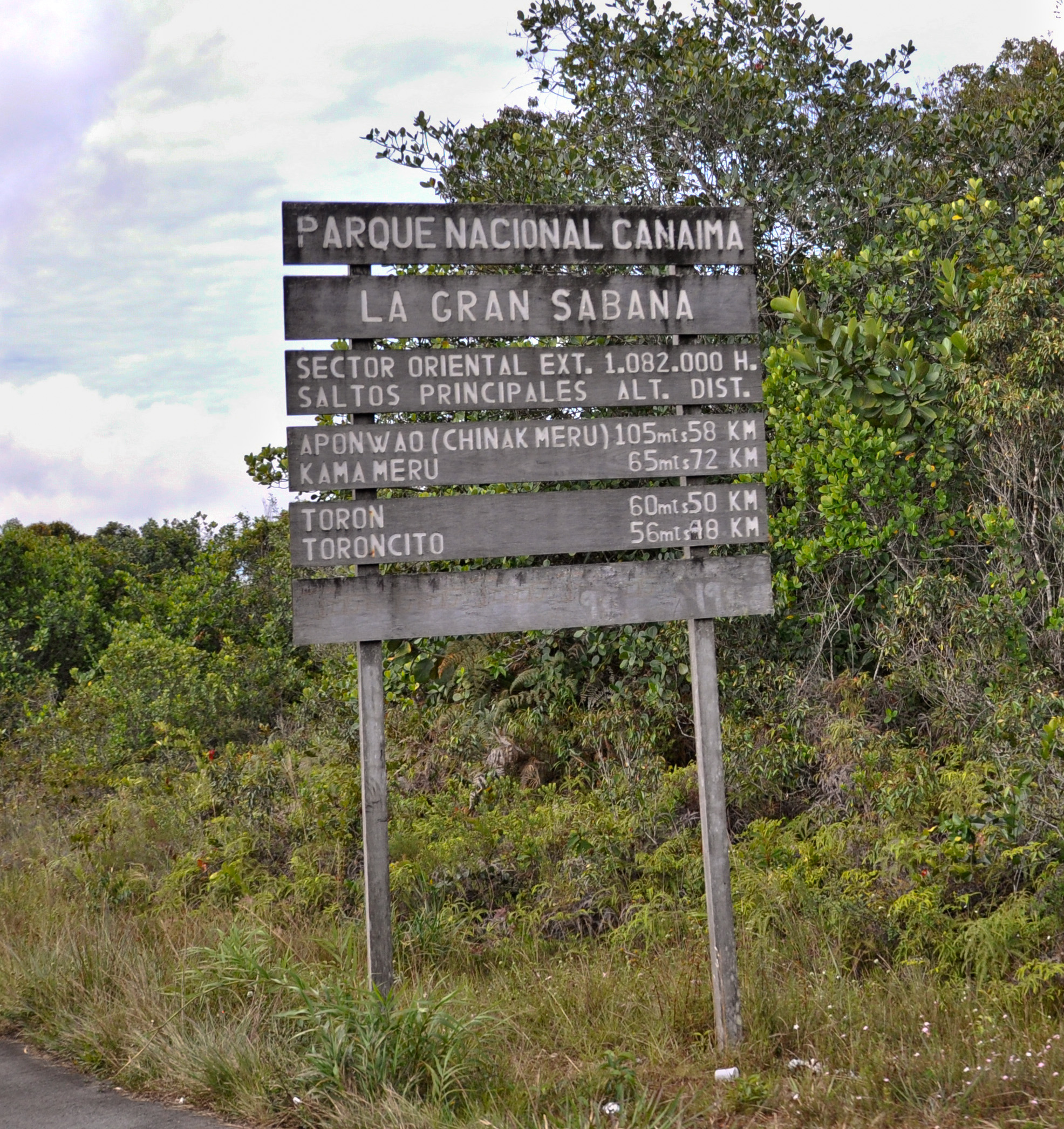
Sign at the entrance to the Gran Sabana

Due to its diverse biology, mineral reserves and geography, the government of Venezuela decided that it was necessary to protect the territory. Canaima was declared a national park with Executive Order 770, dated June 12, 1962. The park is Venezuela's second-largest.

Canaima National Park covers about 3,000,000 hectares (12,000 sq mi), among the world's six largest national parks. Its original area was 1,000,000 hectares (3,900 sq mi), and did not include the Gran Sabana.

The park was enlarged in 1975 to cover several points of high ecological importance. They include the Carrao River basin, the headwaters of the Caroní River, the Sierra de Lema, the source of the Cuyuni River, and the Gran Sabana's rolling plains. The Gran Sabana covers 1,082,000 hectares (4,180 sq mi).

In 1994, UNESCO named Canaima National Park a World Heritage Site. The park is used to promote environmental conservation and ecotourism; thousands of tourists visit it every year.

The Gran Sabana's areas of natural beauty include tepuis, waterfalls and streams, and the park's diverse fauna and flora. The latter attracts scientists from around the world, who study the region's ecological diversity. Forty percent of Venezuela's species are found only in the Gran Sabana – 23 percent of its reptiles and amphibians, including a number of endemic species.

The region's largest city is Santa Elena de Uairén, with a population of over 30,000. It was founded in 1923 by Lucas Fernández Peña, who was attracted by the area's increase in diamond production. Its average temperature is 25 to 28 °C (77 to 82 °F). At 910 meters (2,990 ft) above sea level, it is 15 kilometres (9.3 mi) from the border with Brazil, 615 kilometres (382 mi) from Ciudad Guayana, and about 1,400 kilometres (870 mi) from Caracas by road. The Gran Sabana's estimated population is 48,000.

== Geology ==
The Gran Sabana formed atop the Precambrian Guyana Shield. Its bedrock is the Roraima Group, presumed to be 1.8–1.4 billion years old. Within this group is the resistant Mataui Formation, which forms the tepui cliffs and summits. The formation is 600 to 900 metres (2,000 to 3,000 ft) thick, and consists of quartzite and quartzite arenites. Tepui summits are 900 to 1,600 metres (3,000 to 5,200 ft) above the surrounding terrain. The low area surrounding the table mountains is the Wonkén planation surface. The Auyán-Tepui planation surface forms the quartzite tepui summits. Heavy precipitation, combined with a long period of weathering, has produced quartz and sandstone karst features. These include arches, towers, tower fields, dolines, collapse shafts, polje, corridors, grikes, and large cave systems extending many kilometers. The Roraima Sur–Los Ojos de Cristal cave system is 10.8 kilometres (6.7 mi) long and up to 20 metres (66 ft) in diameter. Portions of the summits have been described as ruinform (landscapes resembling ancient ruins).

== Geography ==
The region experienced several periods of uplift, subsidence and erosion. The large remaining isolated sandstone beds are known as tepuis in the indigenous language. The road from El Dorado to Santa Elena de Uairén rises from 200 to 1,500 meters (660 to 4,920 ft) in less than 30 kilometers (19 mi) in La Escalera. Rocky and sandy soils support savanna vegetation at higher elevations, with dense jungle vegetation in hollows and dense forests along the rivers.

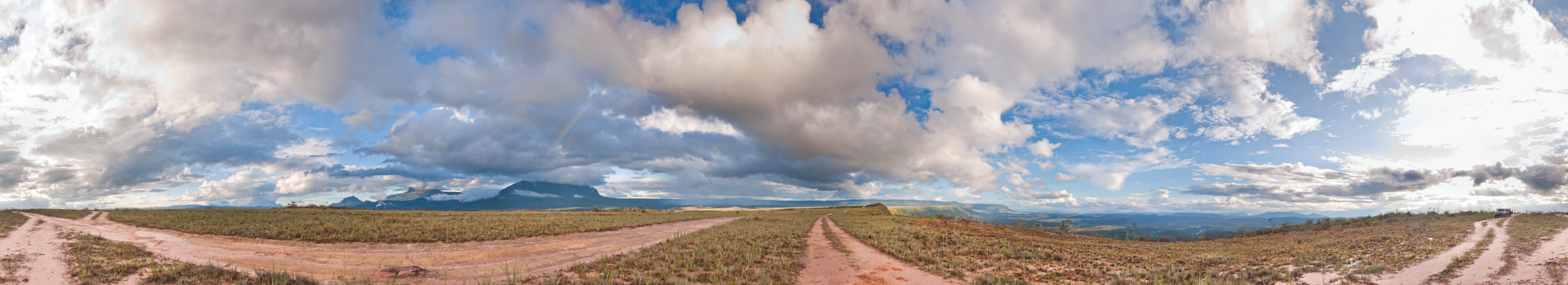
360-degree panorama of a Gran Sabana landscape

=== Hydrology ===
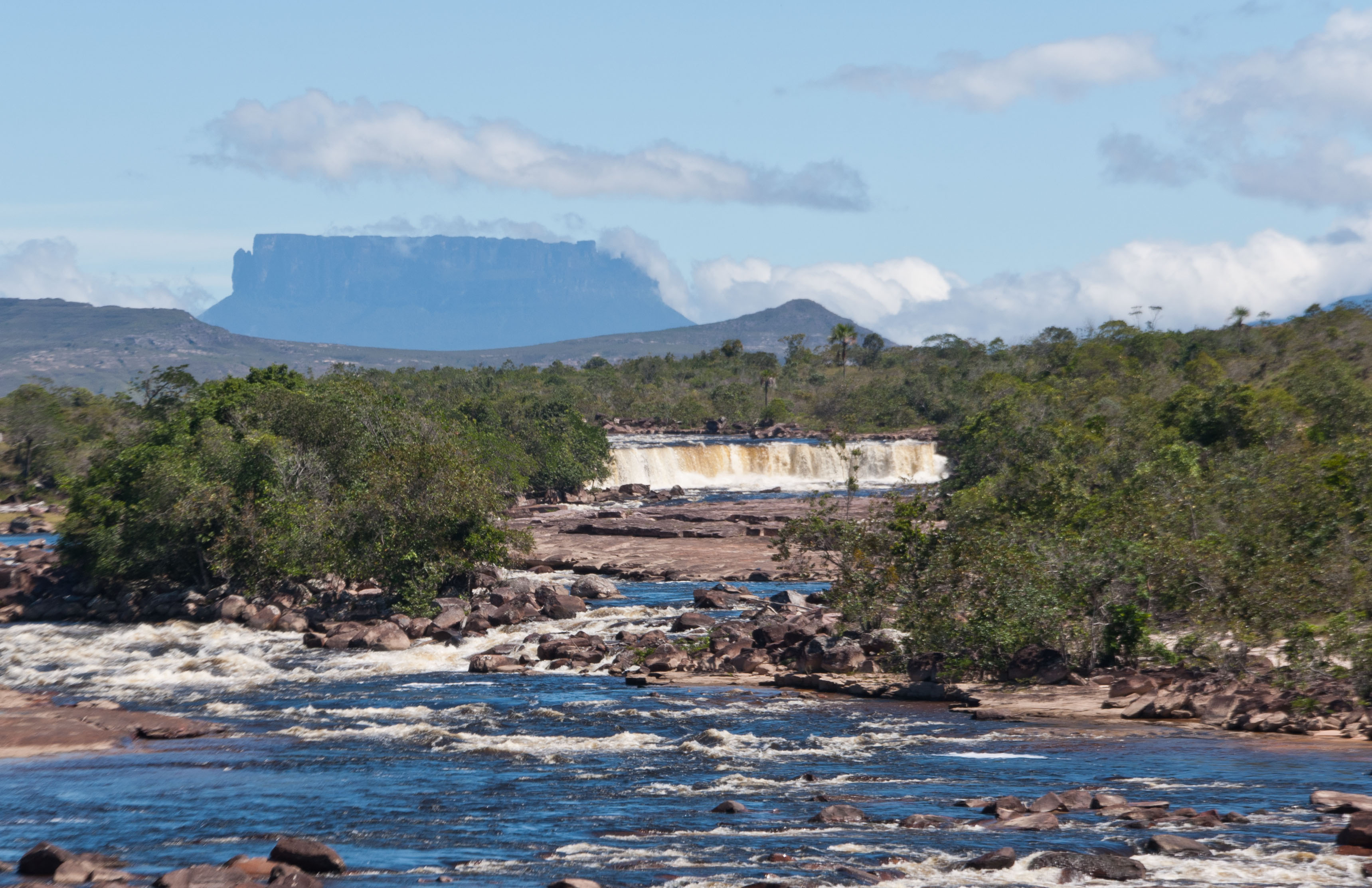
The Yuruaní River, with its tepui in the background

The Gran Sabana, and Venezuela in general, is rich in river networks. The main drainage sub-basins are formed by the Yuruaní, Aponwao, Kukenán, Suruku, Ikabarú, Karuay, Urimán, and Antabare Rivers.

The Caroní River, 925 km (575 mi) long with a flow rate of 5,000 m^{3}/s (180,000 cu ft/s), provides Venezuela with most of its electricity by hydropower. It is fed by the Aponwao, the Yuruaní and the Kukenaning Rivers, flowing from tepuis and mountains of the Gran Sabana.

Most rivers and streams in the region have dark water, with a color similar to tea. The waters are poor in dissolved nutrients and rich in humic acids and tannins, which give them their characteristic brown color. They are acid, with a pH of 3–4.

=== Tepuis ===
In the Gran Sabana, ancient, randomly-distributed massifs eroded in tabletop form and are known as tepuis. They are examples of inverted relief which form a typical plateau in the Guiana Highlands. The highest plateau in the Gran Sabana is Mount Roraima, a tepui reaching nearly 2,800 meters (9,200 ft) above sea level.

==== Auyán-tepui ====
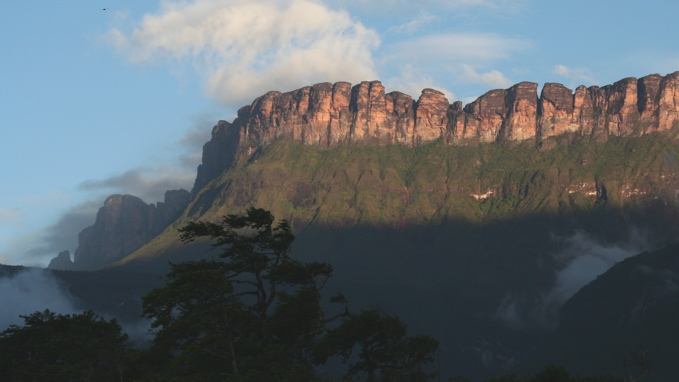
Auyán-tepui, seen from Camp Uruyén

Auyán-tepui, in northwestern Canaima National Park, is the Guiana Highlands' best-known tepui. Its Angel Falls is the world's tallest waterfall, with a drop of almost 979-meter (3,212 ft). The falls were first made known to outsiders by U.S.-born explorer-aviator Jimmy Angel in 1937. He attempted to land his plane on top of Auyán-tepui during an expedition, crashing without fatalities. It is the second-largest Guiana tepui (after Chimantá Massif), with an area of 700 km^{2} (270 sq mi) and an altitude of 2,535 meters (8,317 ft). Auyán-tepui is inclined, exceeding 2,400 meters (7,900 ft) in height on its southern edge and barely 1,600 meters (5,200 ft) on its northern edge.

The southern Auyán-tepui is accessible and climbable. Ropes are needed in some sections, although the degree of difficulty is not high. It is necessary to reach the village of Kavak by plane or helicopter to access the tepui, since there are no vehicle-access routes.

==== Chimantá Massif ====
The Chimantá Massif is formation of plateaus (including Amurí, Churí, and Akopán-tepui) and Venezuela's largest, covering 1,470 km^{2} (570 sq mi). The tepui, in central-western Canaima National Park, is not easily accessible and rarely visited by tourists. While flying over the massif, Venezuelan scientist Charles Brewer Carías discovered a large entrance to a 250-meter-deep (820 ft) cave.

==== Mount Roraima ====
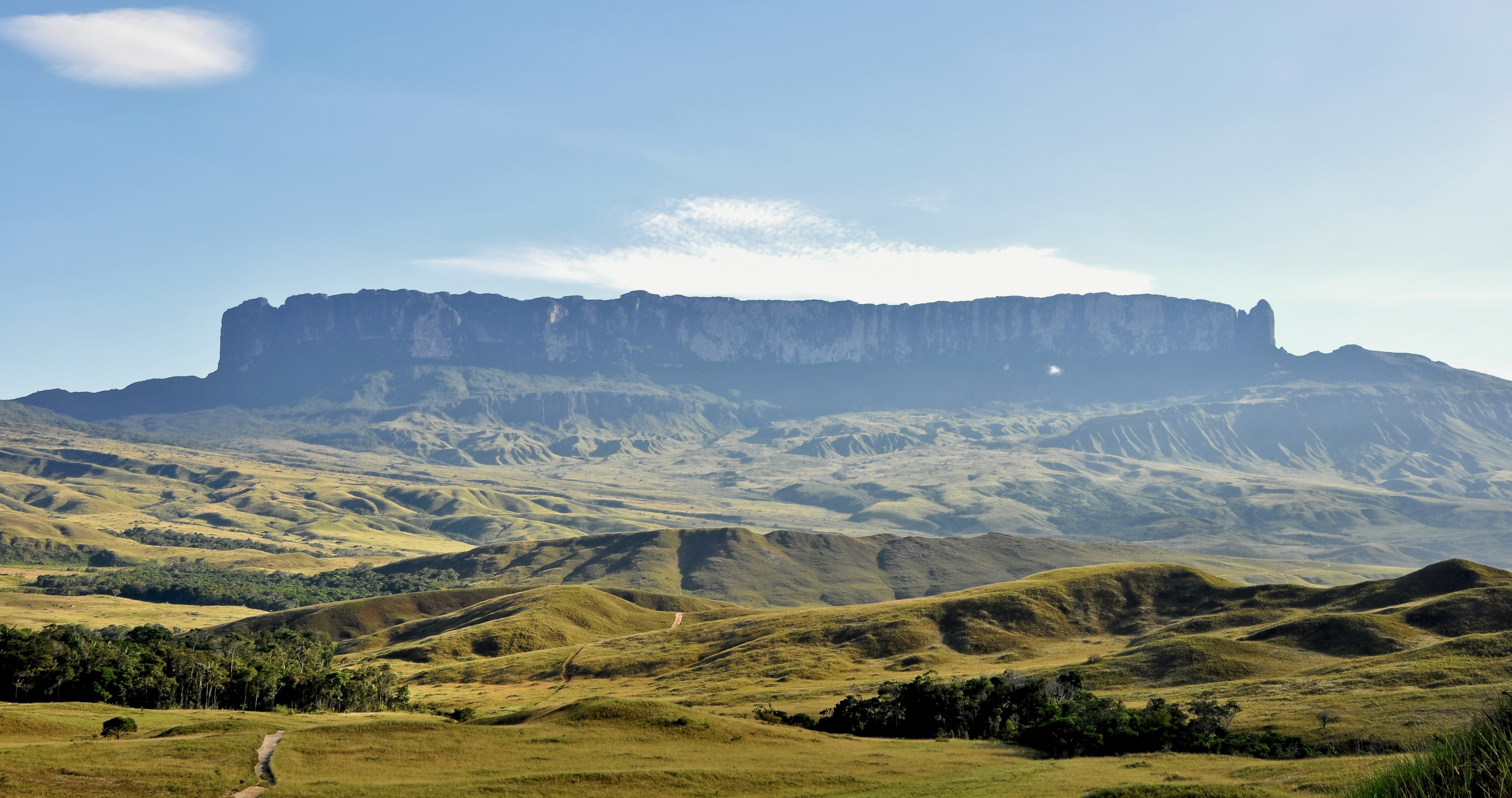
Mount Roraima on a rare clear day

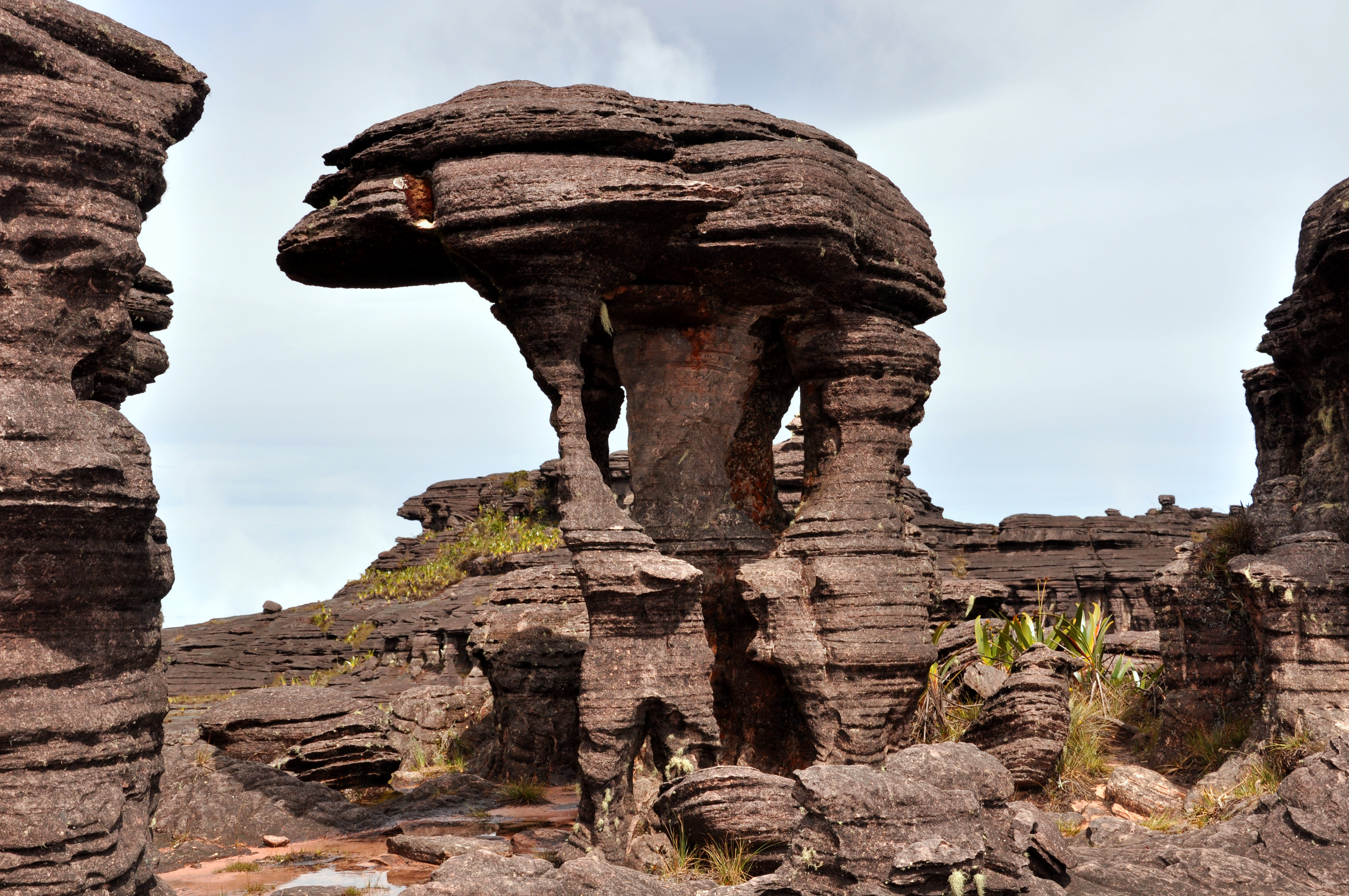
"Elephant" rock formation at the top of Mount Roraima

Mount Roraima, the highest tepui in Canaima National Park, is also known as Blue Mountain or Crystal Mountain and considered a divinity by the local indigenous population. The Pemon believe that most tepuis host powerful spirits or entities which they respect and fear. Some make offerings and say prayers at the top in their infrequent visits to the tepui, usually as tour guides in exchange for money or food). Its height is about 2,800 meters (9,200 ft), and it covers an area of 200 km^{2} (77 sq mi). Its vertical walls may reach 500 meters (1,600 ft) high.

Among its attractions are the Valley of the Crystals (a deposit of quartz formations), the Jacuzzi area (where water has a greenish-yellow color), the viewpoints of La Ventana and El Abismo, the North Mazes, la Proa, Lake Gladys, and the Triple Point. This point, in the northeast of the tepui, is where the borders of Brazil, Venezuela, and Guyana meet. There are also rock formations eroded by wind resembling a flying turtle, a Mexican hat, a monkey eating an ice-cream cone, and an elephant.

==== Kukenán-tepui ====
Also known as Matawi-tepui, Kukenán-tepui has a height of 2,680 meters (8,790 ft) and was first climbed in 1963 on an expedition organized by Bangor University in Wales. The second ascent, in 1972, was by Stephen Platt, Ramon Blanco, Hans Swartz, and Ambrosio Perez. The Matawi-Tepui chain is part of the eastern tepuis of the Gran Sabana with the Yuruani-tepui. It is the location of Kukenan Falls, the world's tenth-highest waterfall, with 629 meters (2,064 ft) of freefall.

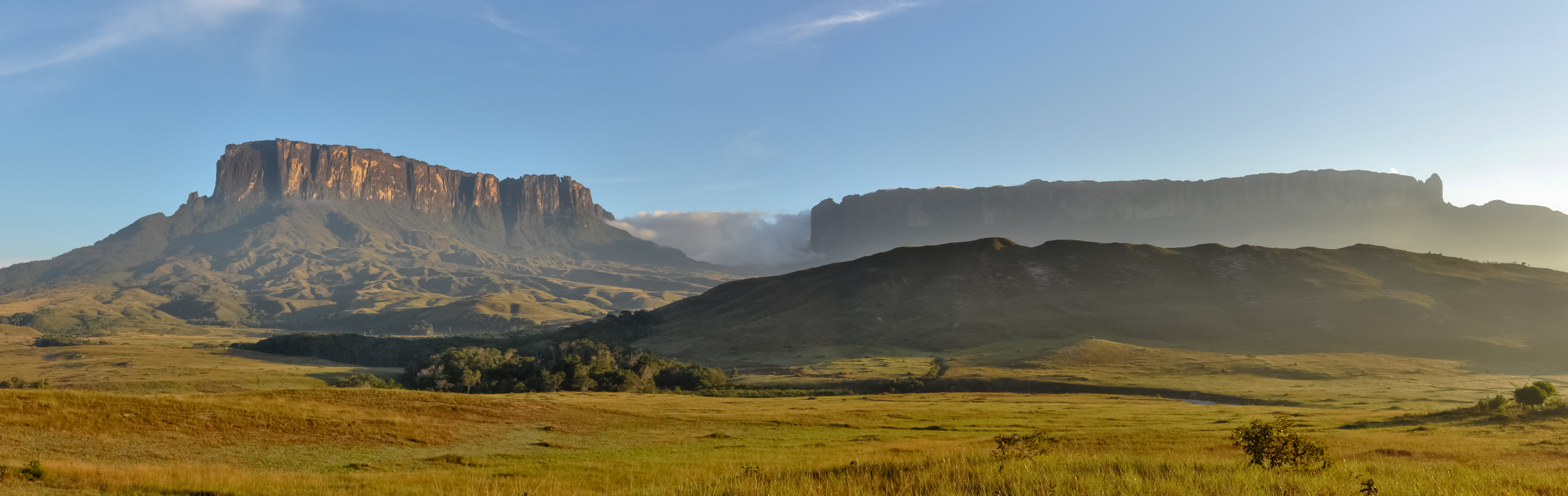
The Kukenan and Roraima tepuis in the Gran Sabana's Canaima National Park

==== Other tepuis ====
Other tepuis are the Ilú-Tramén-Karaurín chain, the Wadaka-piapó (or Wadakapiapü) and the Yuruaní, which (with the Kukenan and Roraima) are in the chain of seven eastern tepuis. They include the tepuis Iglú-tepui, Ptarí-tepui, Acopán-tepui and the Sororopán-tepui, which is tilted and can be climbed. Tramen Tepui (2,700 m), in the Ilú–Tramen Massif, was first climbed by Scharlie Wraight and Stephen Platt from the col between Ilu Tepui and Tramen Tepui on 24 November 1981.

There are about 150 minor tepuis throughout Canaima National Park. Most tepuis reach heights of 2,000 to 2,700 metres (6,600 to 8,900 ft).

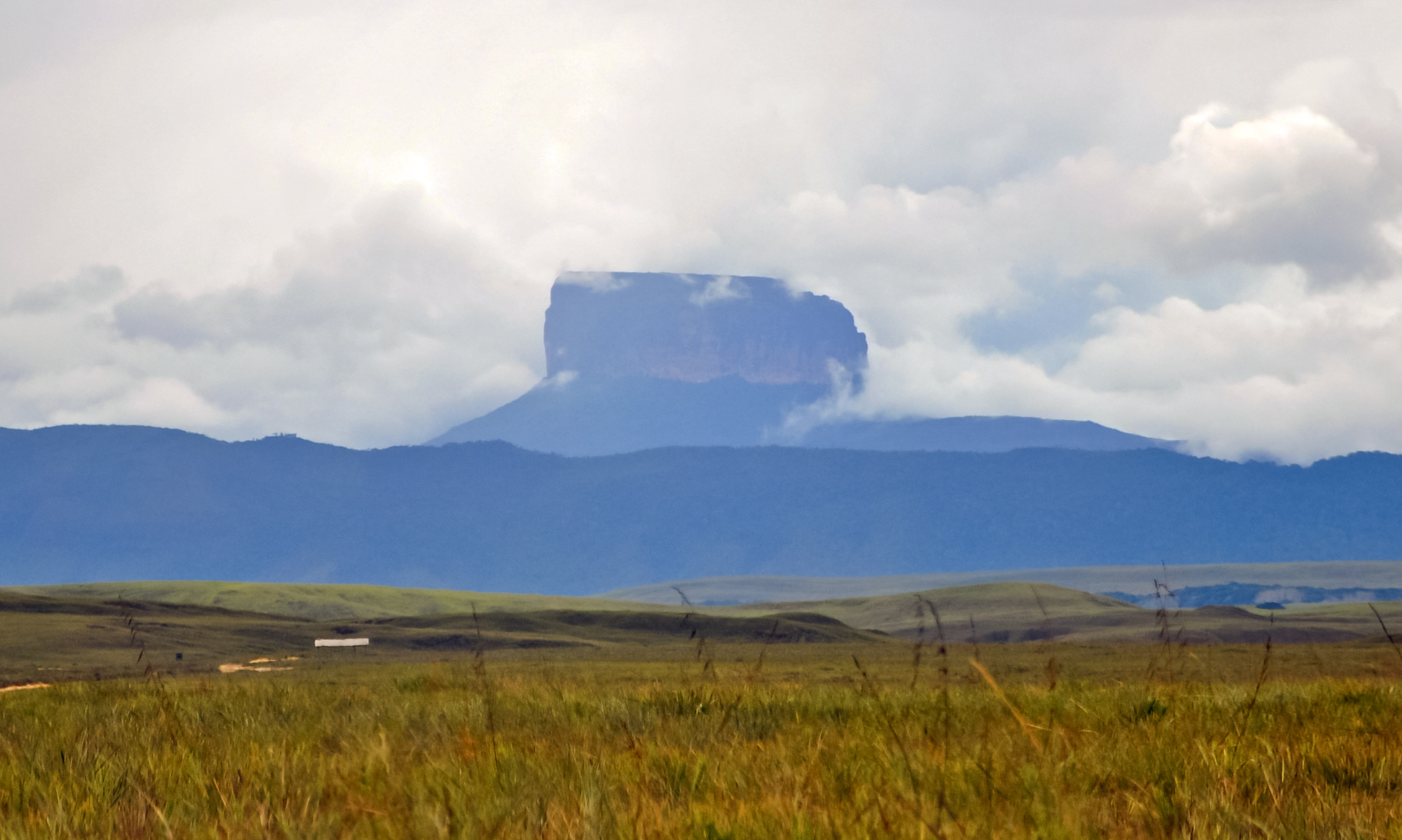
Ptarí-tepui

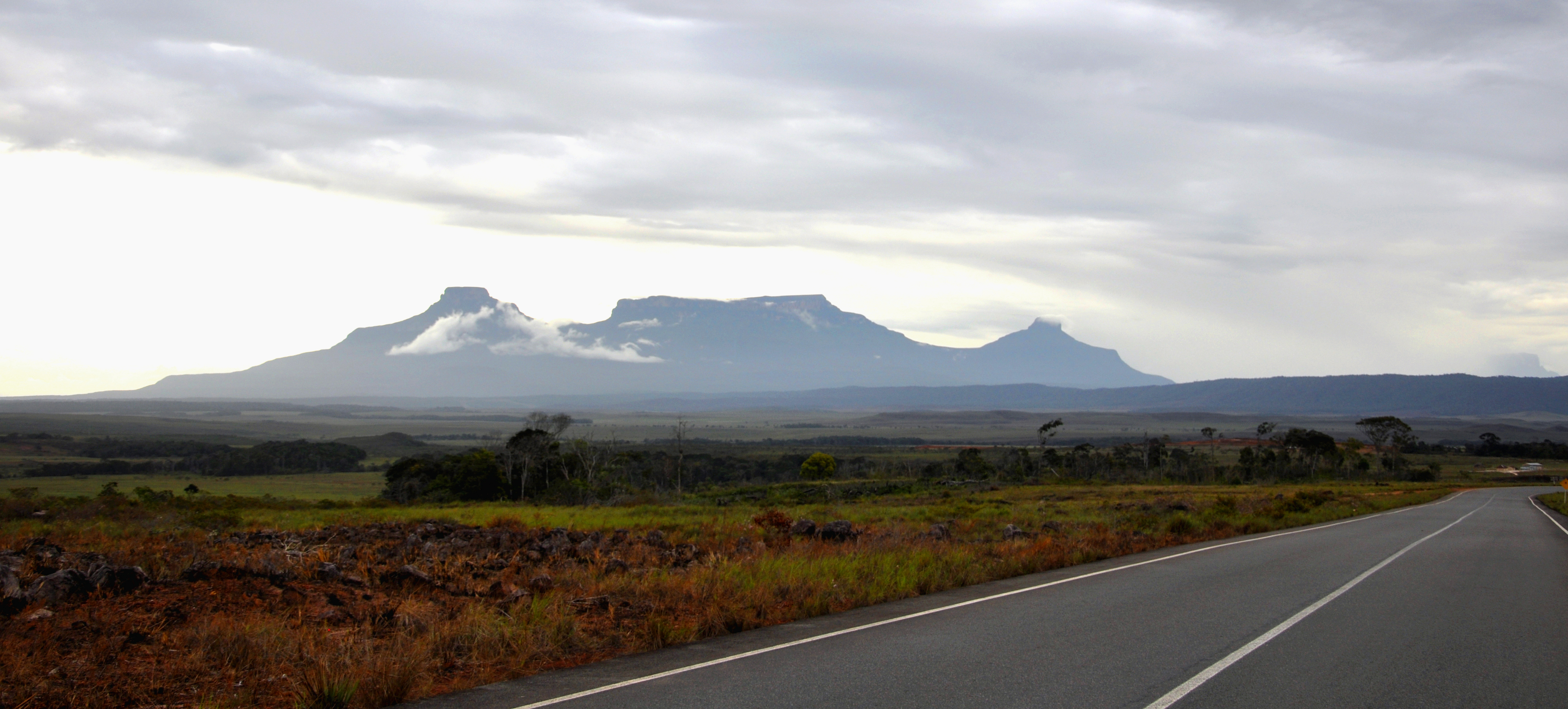
Ilú, Tramén and Karaurín tepuis

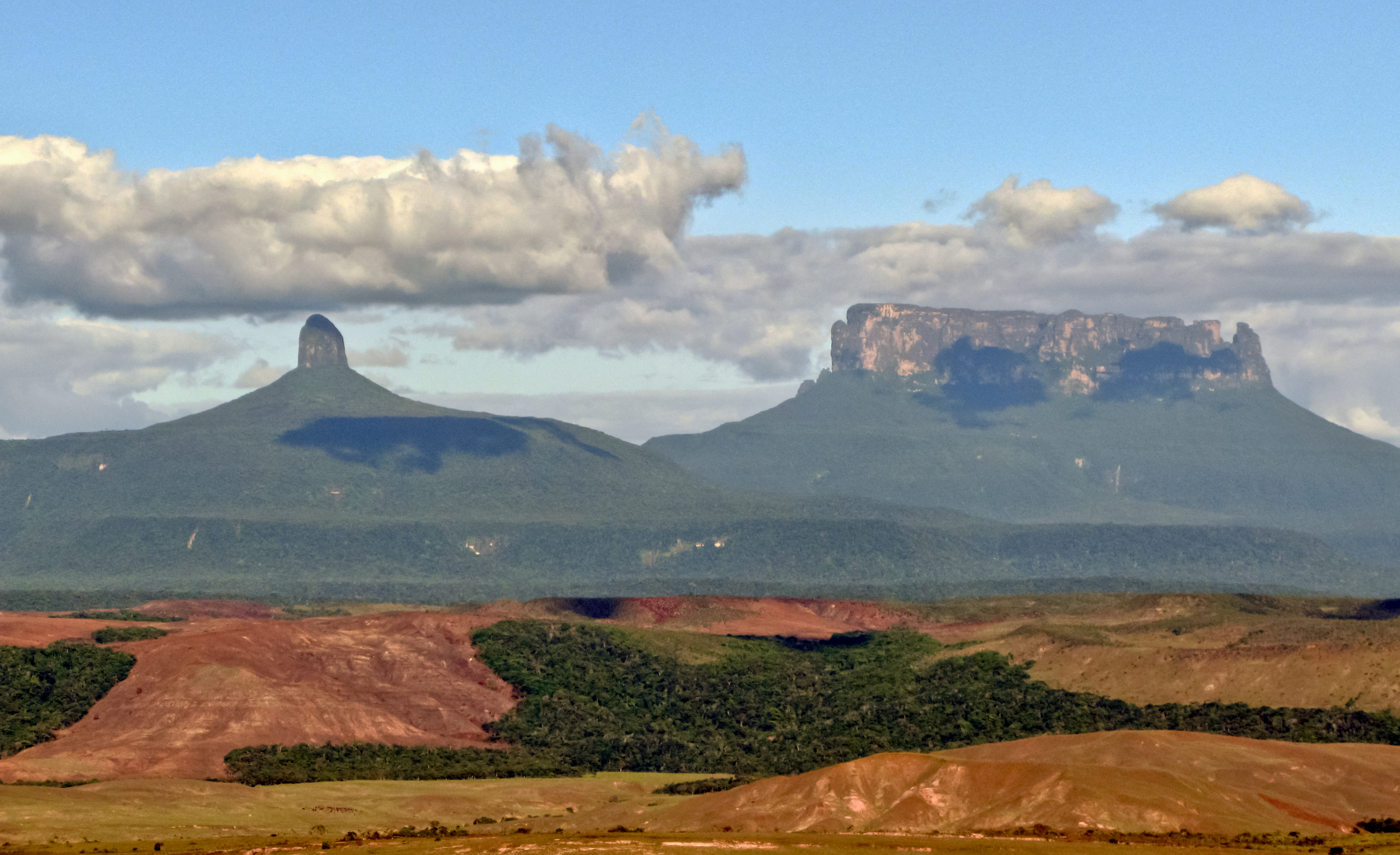
Wadaka-piapó and Yuruaní tepuis

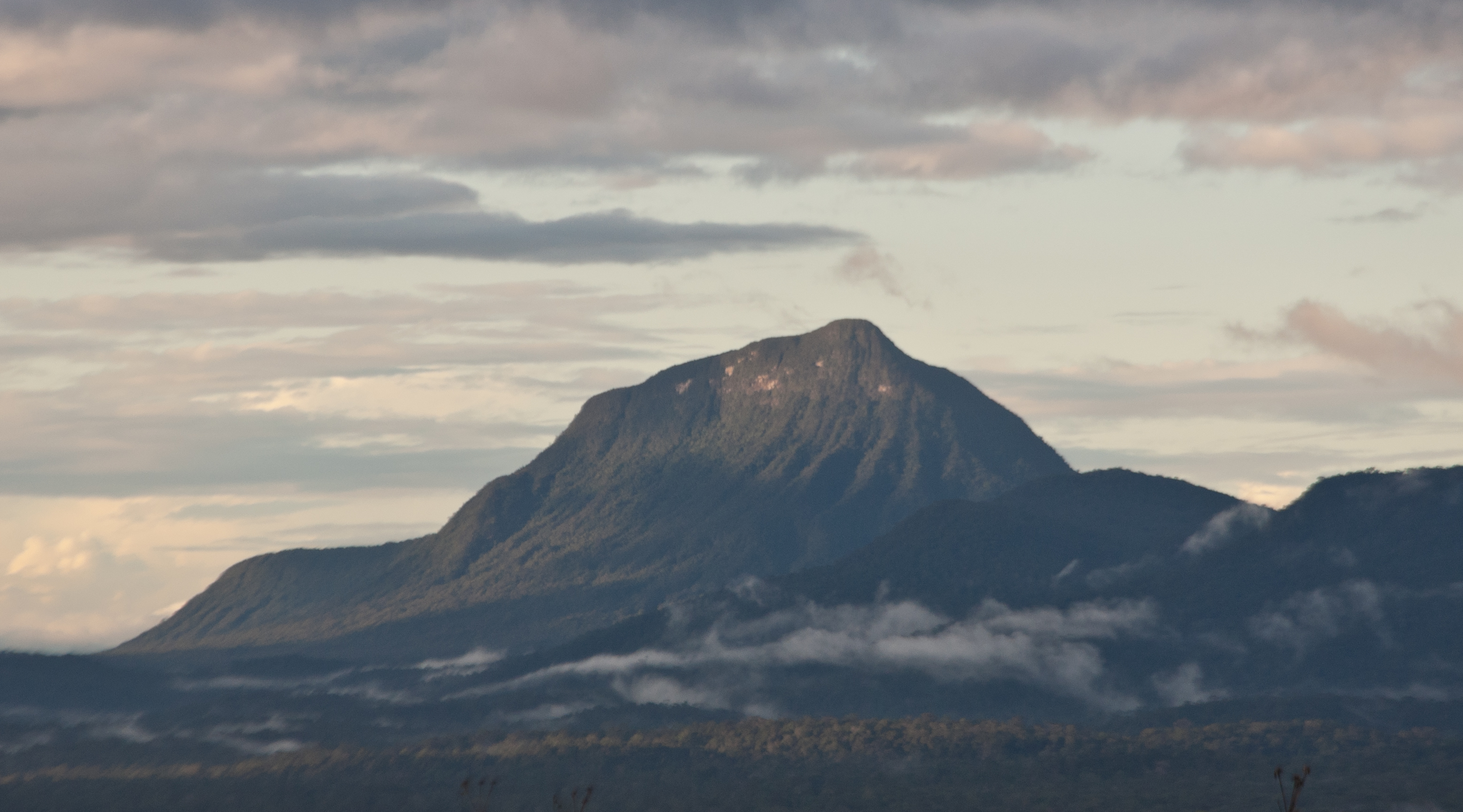
Moná-tepui

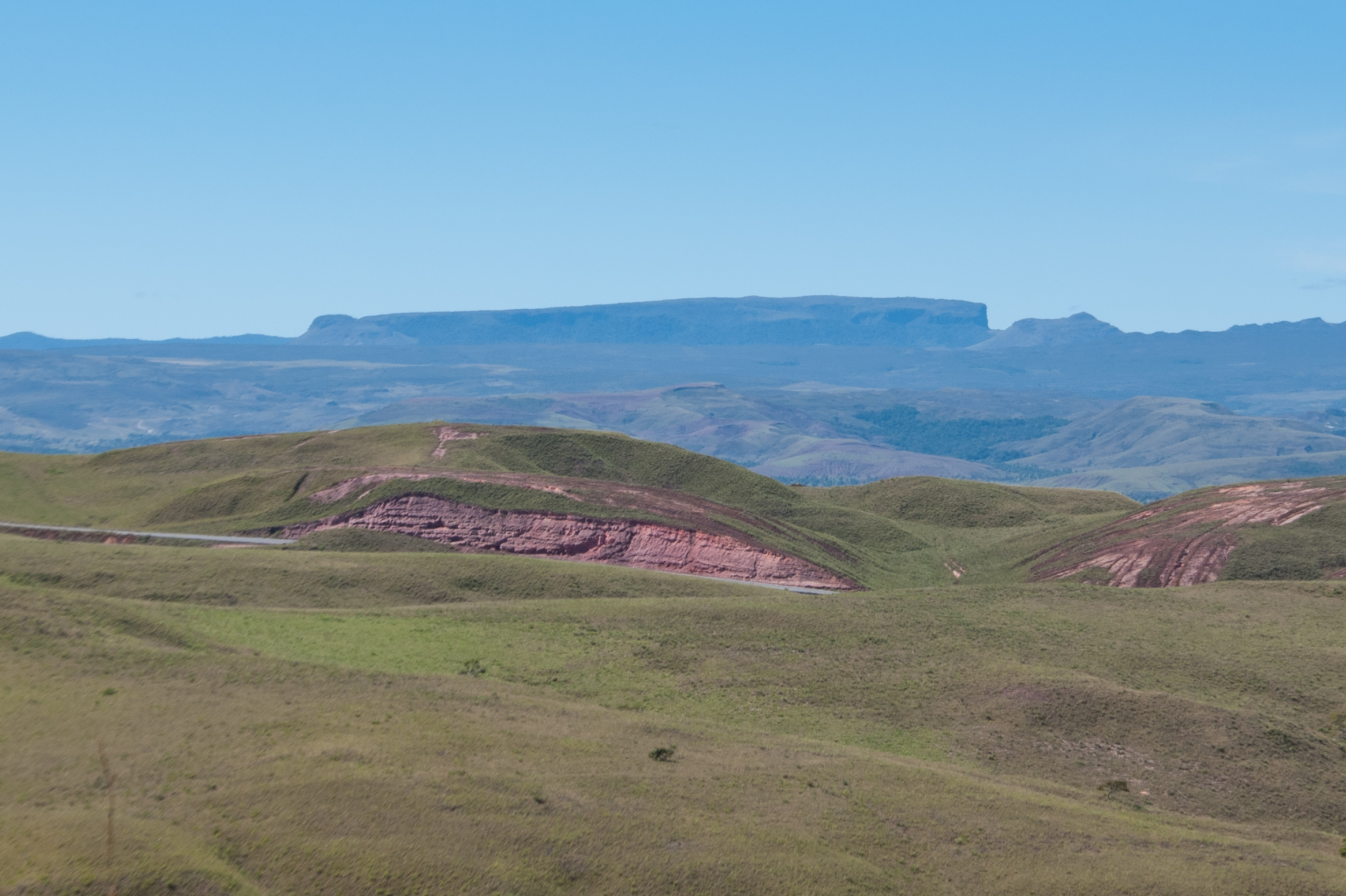
Chiricayen tepui

== Climate ==
=== Temperature ===
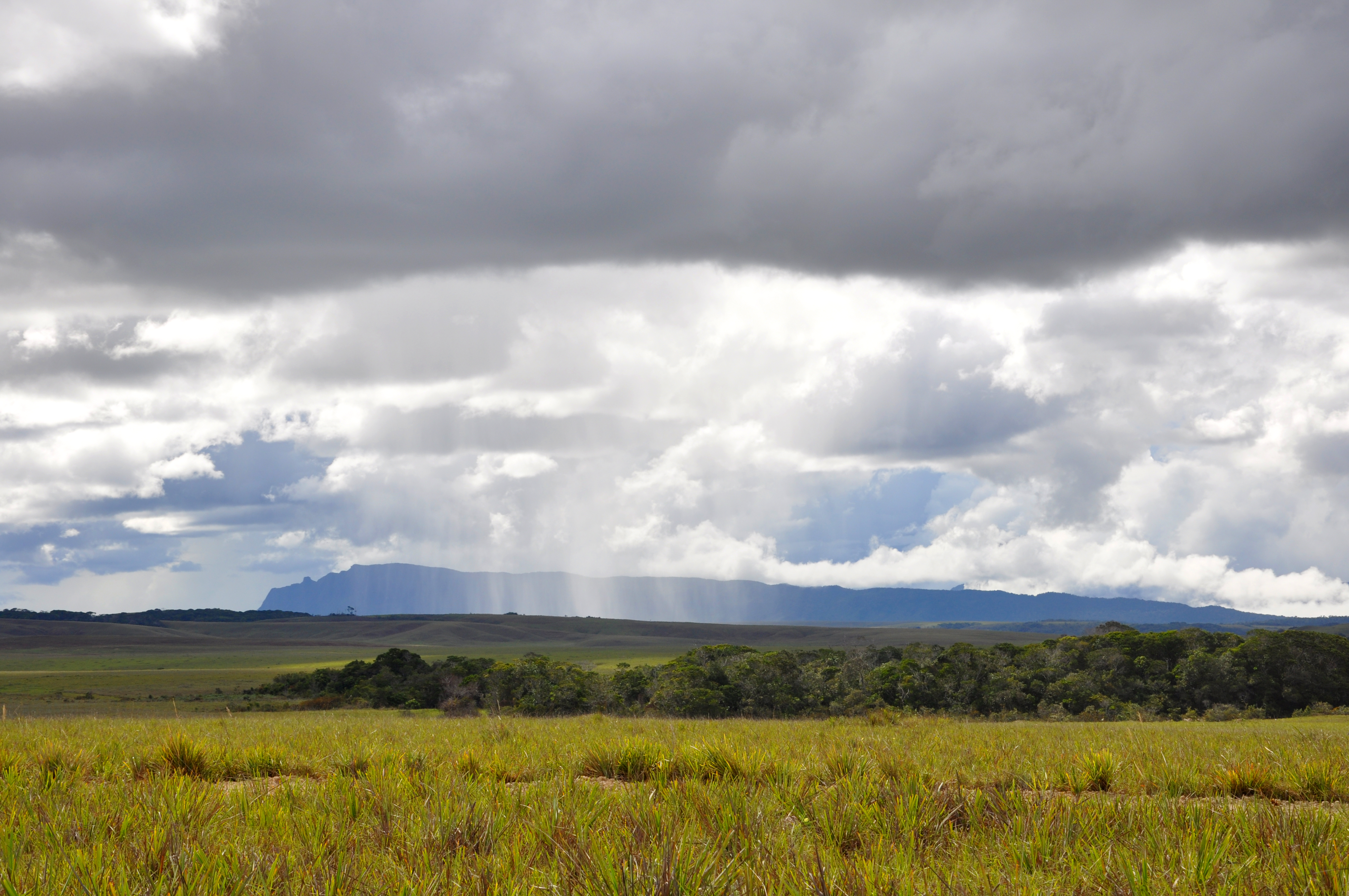
Rain in front of Sororopán-tepui

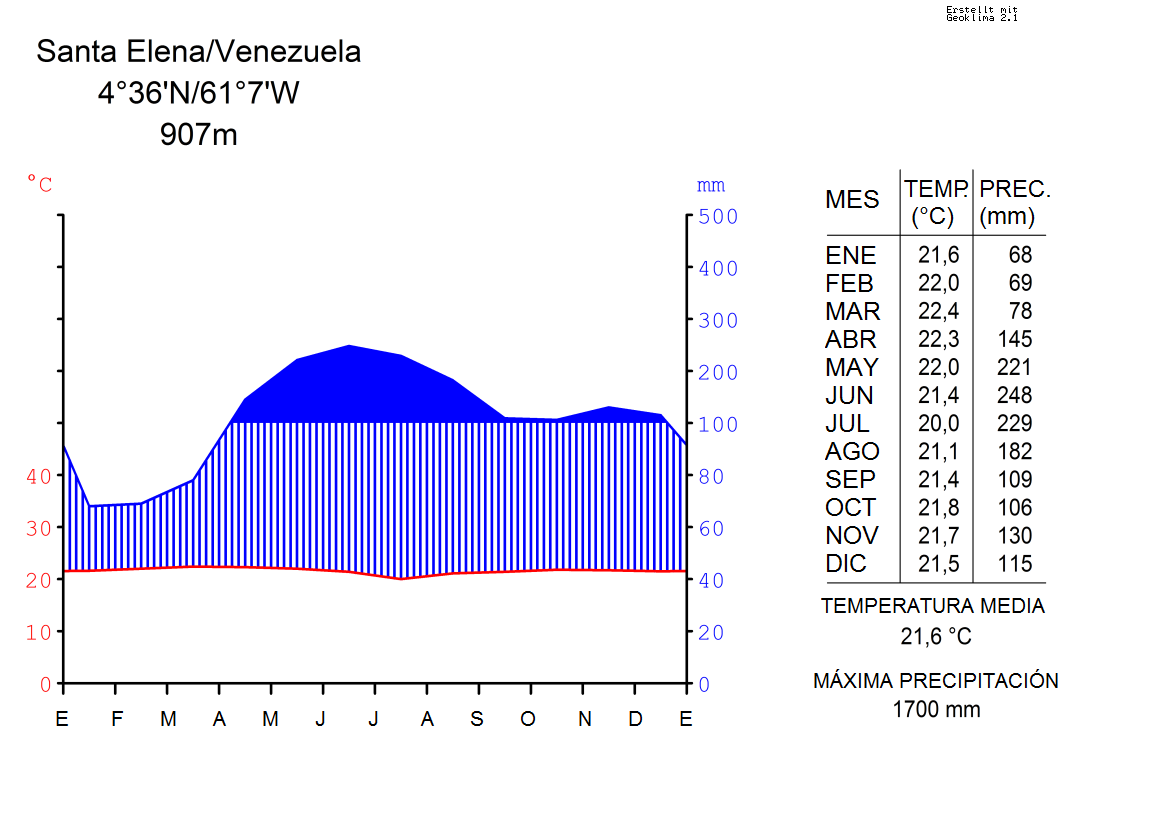
Climate diagram of Santa Elena

Due to the Gran Sabana's elevation, about 1,000 metres (3,300 ft) on average, it has an average annual temperature of 20 °C (68 °F) (similar to the Caracas valley). Due to cloud cover and rainfall, daily temperatures vary. Minimum temperatures rarely drop below 8–10 °C (46–50 °F), except on top of the tepuis. Maximum temperatures usually do not exceed 32–35 °C (90–95 °F).

=== Precipitation ===
The rainy season lasts about 10 months, with a period of relative drought between January and March and an annual average of 1,600 to 2,200 mm (63 to 87 in) (twice that of Caracas). The average varies along the savanna; in the south it is 1,600 to 1,900 mm (63 to 75 in), 1,600 to 2,500 millimetres (63 to 98 in) in the north, and over 3,000 mm (120 in) in the south-east.

=== Wind ===
The La Escalera area and the savanna experience strong winds. Altitude and winds determine climate, since the Gran Sabana's latitude (between 4° and 8° north) is within the equatorial belt. The lower area further north is influenced by winds from the east and northeast, resulting in a rainy and dry season. The south and southeast are affected by winds from the Amazon rainforest, and receive heavy rain.

== Flora ==
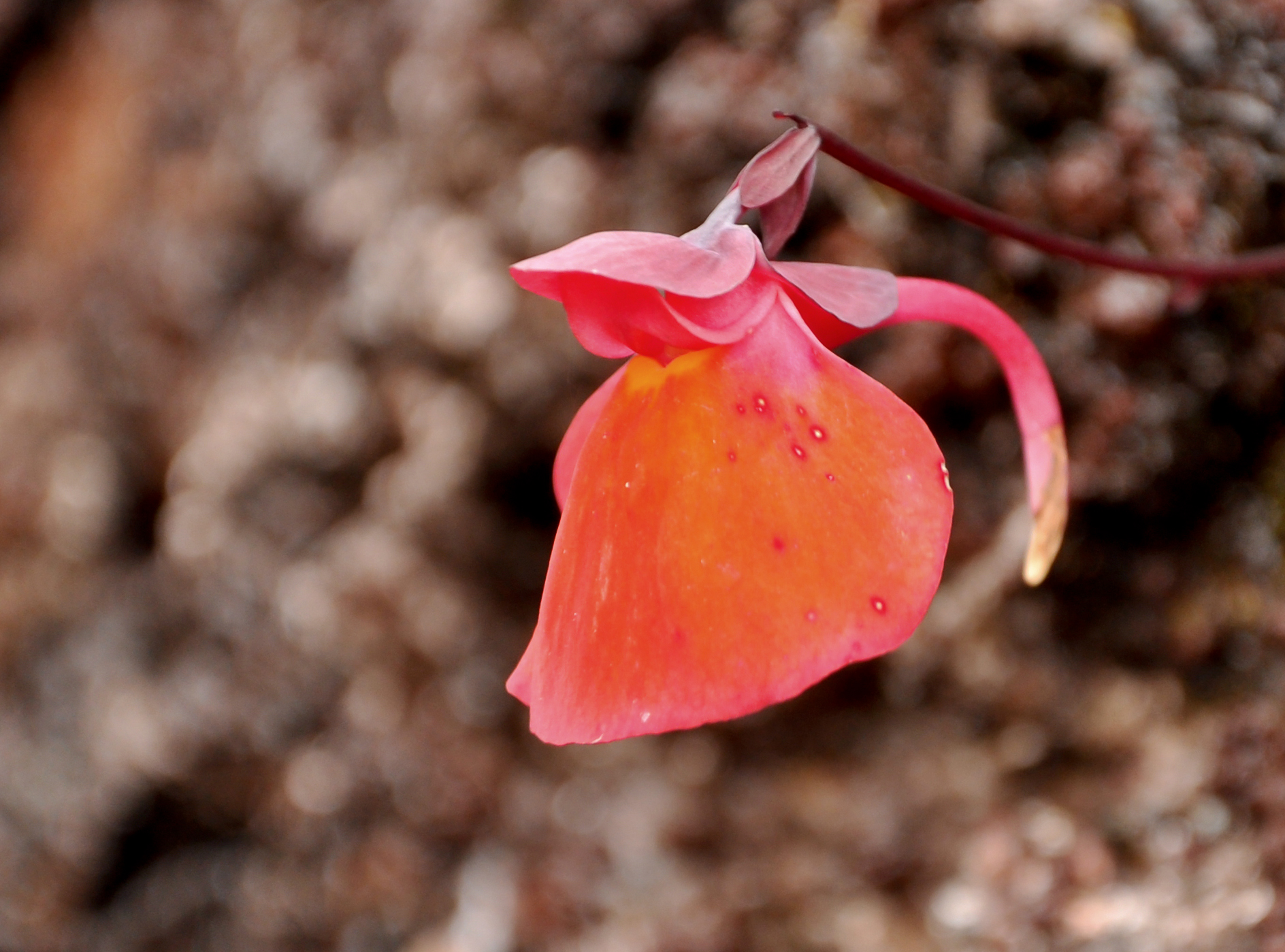
Utricularia quelchii on Roraima

The Gran Sabana has a variety of climatic and ecological conditions, ranging from hot lowlands to high, cold mountains, and has a number of plant species. The vegetation, particular to the region, is based on acidic soils derived from sandstone.

Forests are along rivers and streams, and include trees, shrubs, guacos, epiphytes, and the Moriche Palm. Shrubs rarely exceed 2–3 meters (6 ft 7 in – 9 ft 10 in) high. Leaves are primarily thick, probably due to soil acidity and lack of nutrients. The Gran Sabana has a variety of grasses, but the rocky, sandy soil makes them unsuitable for feeding livestock. The most important plant families are Theaceae, Humiriaceae, Ericaceae, Compositae, Aquifoliaceae, Burseraceae, and Sapotaceae. A wide variety of plants grow on the summits of the tepuis, ranging from 20–30 centimeters (7.9–11.8 in) to 4 meters (13 ft) high.

In the rivers and waterfalls, plants on the rocks are green or tan; they are Spermatophyte plants of the family Podostemaceae. From 600 to 1,200 meters (2,000 to 3,900 ft) above sea level, the submontane evergreen forests (20–30 meters [66–98 ft]) have a thick, well-developed understory. At 1,200–2,000 meters (3,900–6,600 ft) on large tepui, low evergreen forests grow above 1,700 metres (5,600 ft). These form dense communities at medium-to-high altitudes, sometimes with a number of epiphytes. The summits of Auyantepui and the Massif Chimantá have several unique plants, such as the genera Brocchinia (family Bromeliaceae), Tepuia (Ericaceae), Mallophyton (Melastomataceae), Coryphothamnus and Aphanocarpus (Rubiaceae), and Arimantaea and Achnopogon (Asteraceae). Many of the rarest species are found on exposed sandstone formations. Endemic ferns of the genus Hymenophyllopsis and Pterozonium are found in shady and protected areas beneath rocks and in small cavities.

Carnivorous plant communities of the genera Heliamphora (Venezuelan pitcher plants), Drosera (sundews), and Utricularia (bladderworts) are found in the bedrock, where there is a thin layer of nutrient-deficient debris and dirt. This naturally-poor substrate has stimulated these genera to develop insectivorous habits.

== Fauna ==
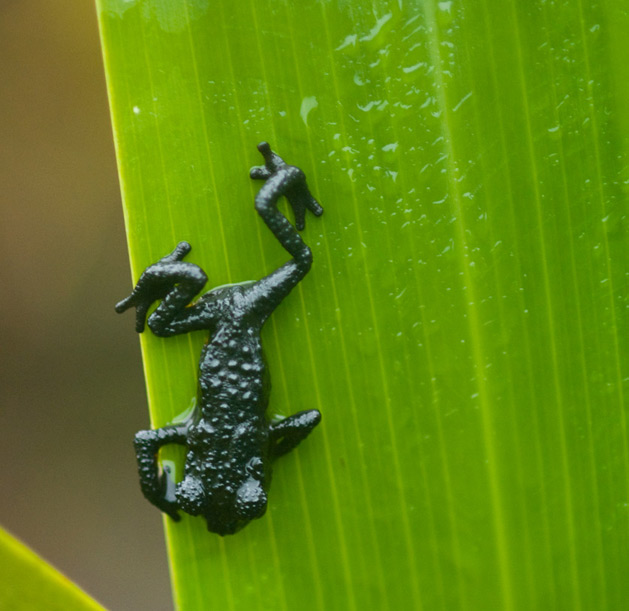
Roraima bush toad (Oreophrynella quelchii)

Despite the Gran Sabana's biodiversity, sightings of larger animals on the road between El Dorado and Santa Elena de Uairén are uncommon. The forest is open along that route; many animals are wary of people (and predators) and hide in the forest, riparian zones, and in the deep jungle at the base of the tepuis. Many species (several highly-endangered) can still be seen, however, including at least 25 mammal species:

- Amazonian brown brocket deer (Mazama nemorivaga)
- Black-bearded saki (Chiropotes satanas)
- Bush dog (Speothos venaticus)
- Capybara (Hydrochoerus hydrochaeris)
- Collared peccary (Pecari tajacu)
- Colombian red howler (Alouatta seniculus)
- Common red brocket deer (Mazama americana)
- Crab-eating fox (Cerdocyon thous)
- Flat-faced fruit-eating bat (Artibeus planirostris)
- Free-tailed bats (Molossinae sp.)
- Giant anteater (Myrmecophaga tridactyla)
- Giant armadillo (Priodontes maximus)
- Giant otter (Pteronura brasiliensis)
- Guyana red howler (Alouatta macconnelli)
- Jaguar (Panthera onca)
- Kinkajou (Potos flavus)
- Long-tailed weasel (Neogale frenata)
- Margay (Leopardus wiedii)
- Nine-banded armadillo (Dasypus novemcinctus)
- Ocelot (Leopardus pardalis)
- Prehensile-tailed porcupine (Coendou sp.)
- Puma (Puma concolor)
- Red-rumped agouti (Dasyprocta leporina)
- Short-tailed bat (Carollia sp.)
- South American coati (Nasua nasua)
- South American tapir (Tapirus terrestris)
- Southern naked-tailed armadillo (Cabassous unicinctus)
- Southern opossum (Didelphis marsupialis)
- Spotted paca (Cuniculis paca)
- Tamandua (Tamandua tetradactyla)
- Tayra (Eira barbara)
- Tyler's mouse opossum (Marmosa tyleriana)
- Weeper capuchin (Cebus olivaceus)
- White-faced saki (Pithecia pithecia)

Eighty-five to 100 bird species are present, including the Andean cock-of-the-rock (R. rupicola) and the harpy eagle (H. harpyja). Among the several dozen reptile species are lizards such as the giant ameiva (A. ameiva), grass anoles (A. auratus), green iguanas (I. iguana), rainbow whiptails (C. lemniscatus), striped kentropyx (K. striata), and Peter's lava lizard (T. hispidus). Snakes are abundant, including venomous species such as the neotropical rattlesnake (C. durissus) and the speckled forest pit viper (B. taeniatus). Constrictors include the green anaconda (E. murinus), the red-tailed (Boa constrictor) and the brown rainbow boas (E. maurus). Other snake species include the brown sipo (C. fuscus), the forest flame snake (O. petolarius), Oliver's parrot snake (L. coeruleodorsus), snail-eating snakes (Dipsas sp.), cutlass snakes (P. sexcarinatus), and the pineapple cuaima (Lachesis muta muta). Dozens of species of amphibians live in the area, including the "bumblebee" (or black-and-yellow) poison dart frog (D. leucomelas).

== Ethnic groups ==
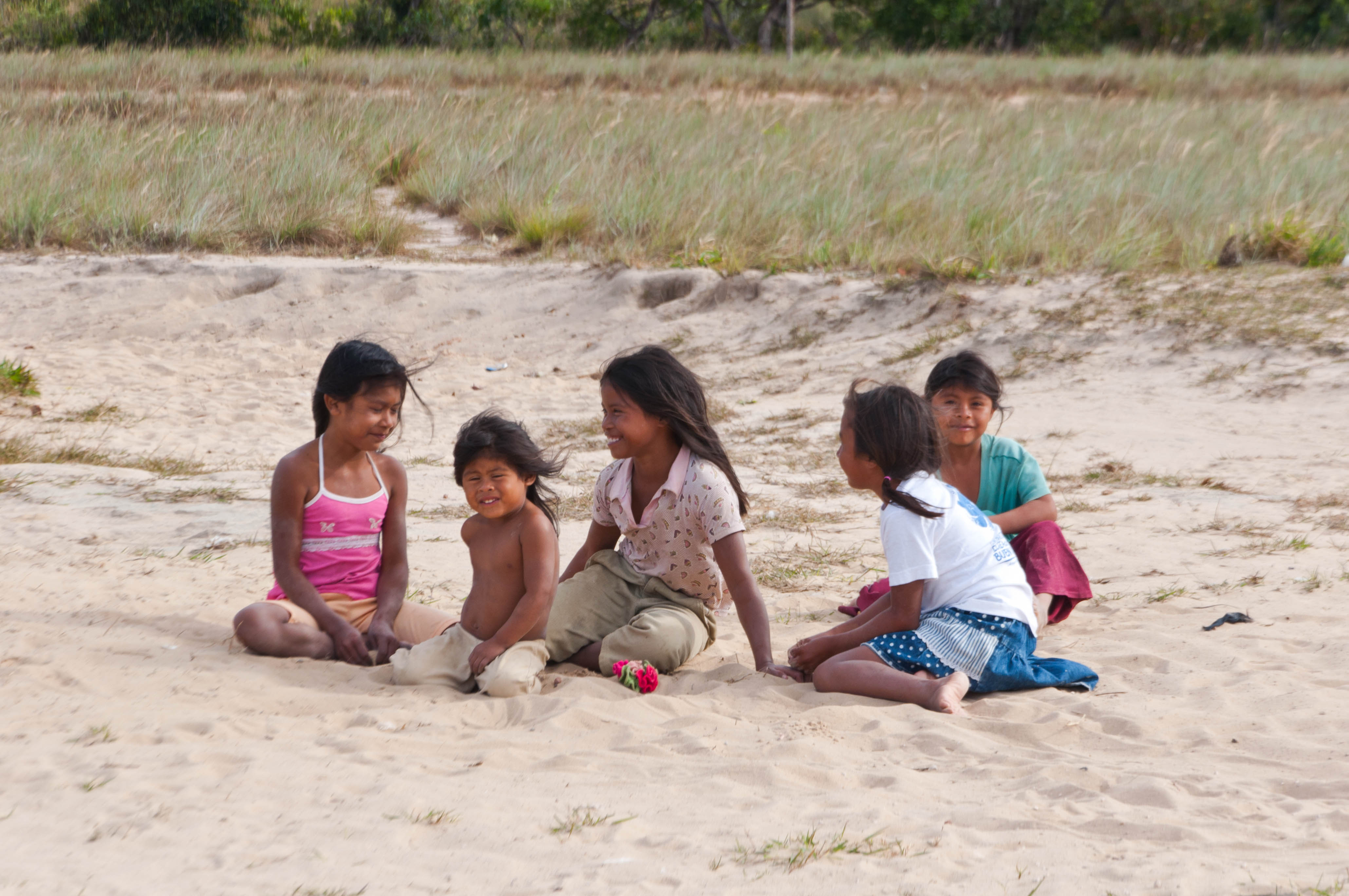
Pemón girls playing in the sand

The Pemon are the largest group of indigenous people in the region. Scattered throughout Canaima National Park, they are divided into three groups: Arekunas, Taurepanes, and Kamarakotos. Many work in the tourism industry, managing inns and guiding expeditions. According to the 2001 INE census, 42,600 indigenous people lived in the state of Bolívar; most lived in the Gran Sabana.

=== Languages ===
The primary indigenous language is Pemon. Most indigenous and non-indigenous people speak Spanish. In Santa Elena de Uairén, near the Brazilian border, Portuguese is spoken.

=== Communities ===
==== Santa Elena de Uairén ====
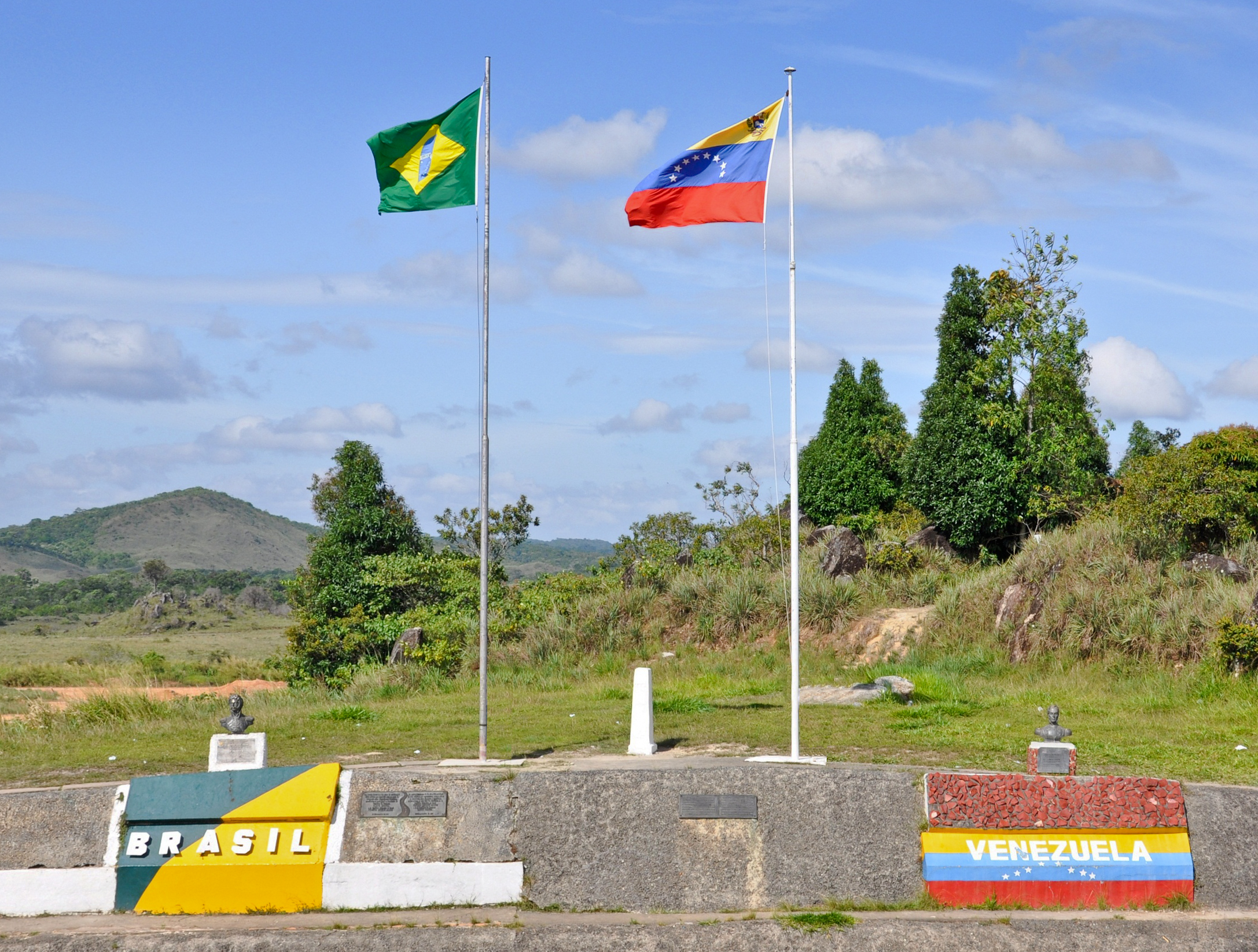
The Brazil-Venezuela border near Santa Elena de Uairén

Santa Elena de Uairén is the capital of the Gran Sabana Municipality. The city's name originated from the first daughter of founder Lucas Fernández Peña and the river that crosses the city. It has an airport and a military post and became a free port in 1999. Its economy is based on commerce and mining. Tourism has become more important due to the city's proximity to the border and the Gran Sabana.

==== Kavanayén ====
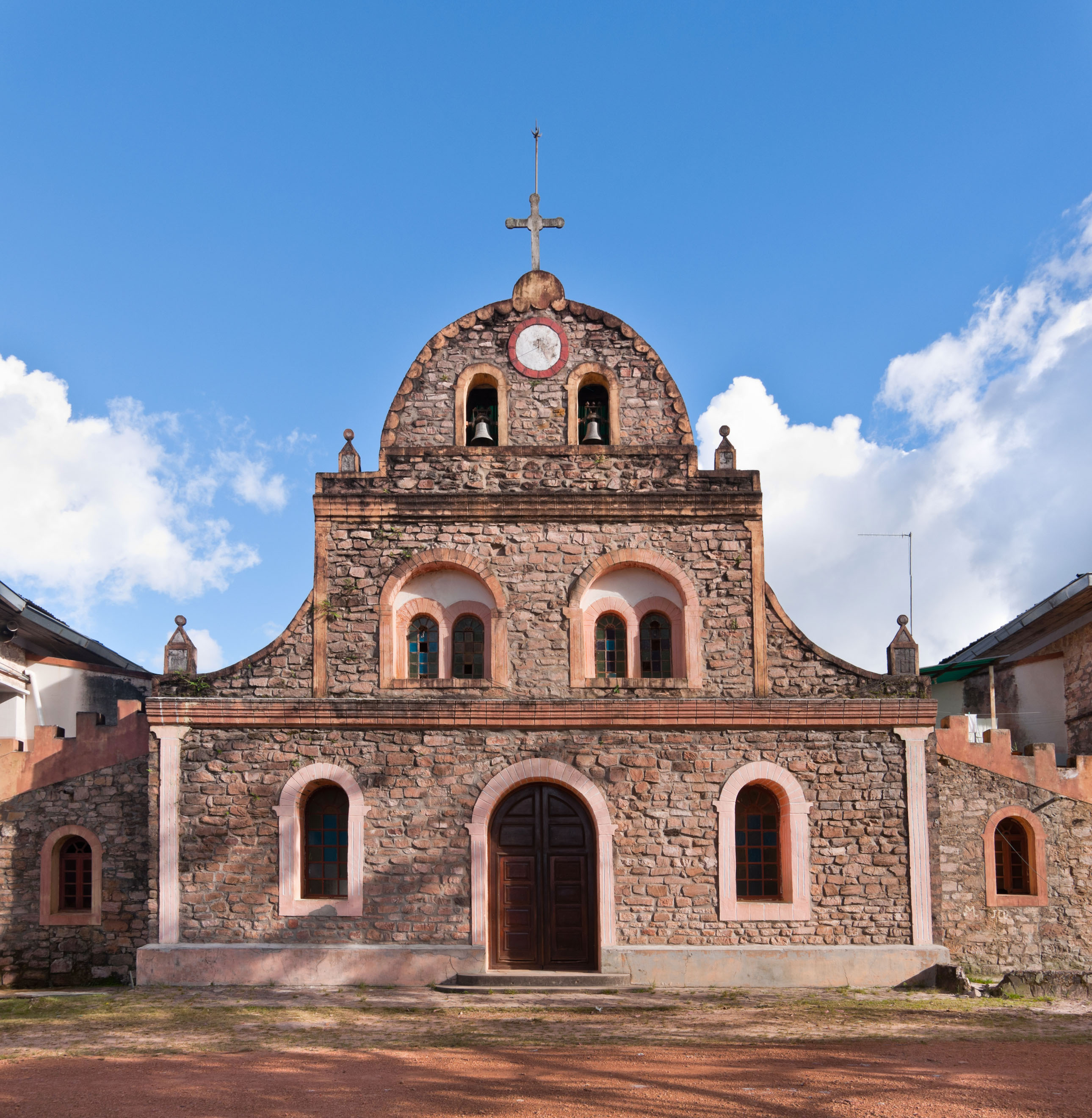
Church of Santa Teresita de Kavanayén

Kavanayén (Santa Teresita de Kavanayén) is an indigenous village in Canaima National Park, along the Upper Caroní River. Capuchin missionaries founded the village in 1943, and its buildings were constructed with native stone.

==== San Francisco de Yuruaní (Kumaracapai) ====
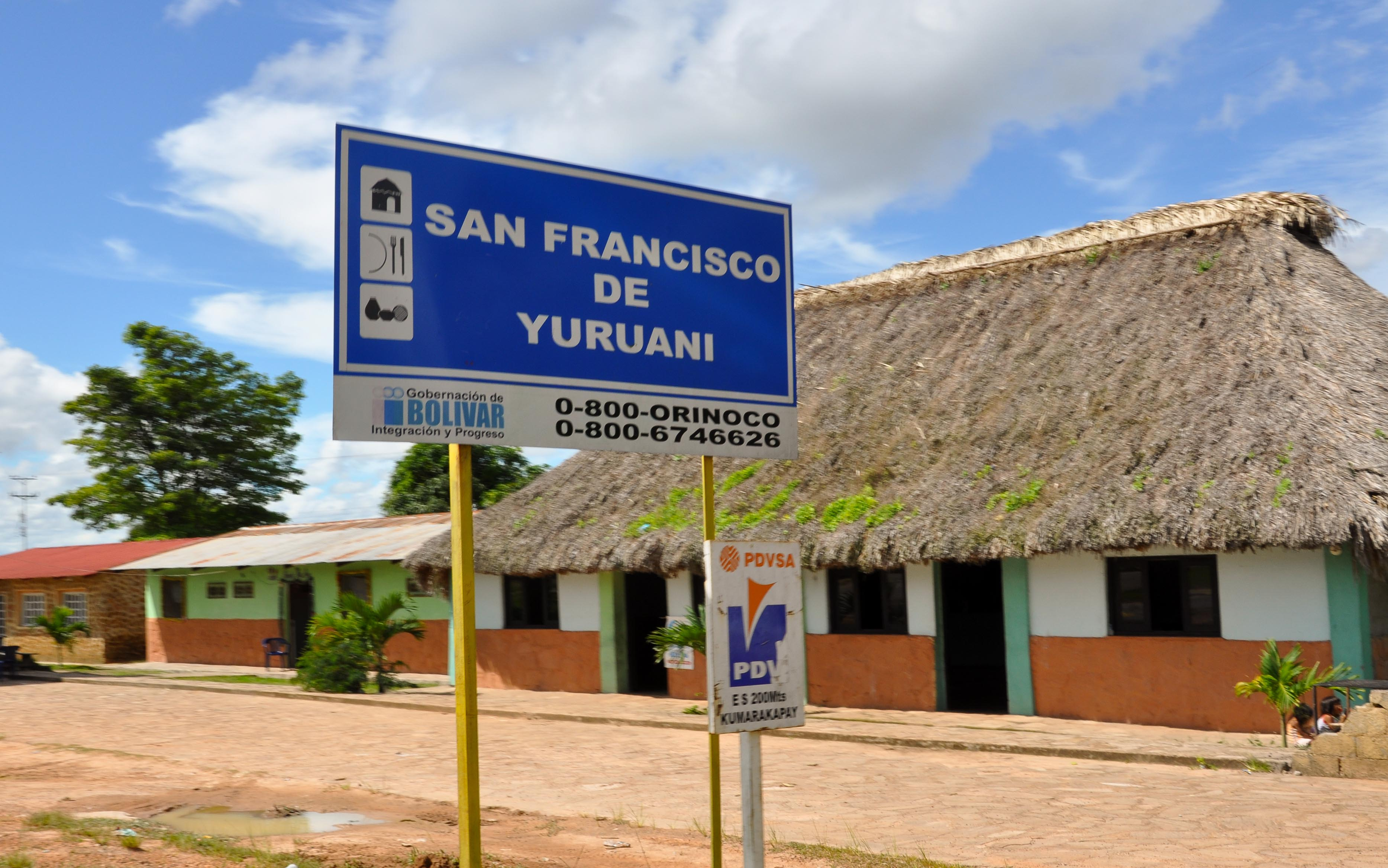
Road sign for San Francisco de Yuruaní

San Francisco de Yuruaní, also known as Kumaracapai, is noted for Brazilian tourism. It was the site of a 2019 mass shooting, when Venezuelan troops fired on protesters.

== Tourism ==
The Gran Sabana is accessible by the paved Troncal 10, which passes through Ciudad Guayana to the Brazilian border. Troncal 10 passes La Escalera, an uphill road with curves, to a paved road through the Gran Sabana. Other roads are not paved. It is accessible by air from Santa Elena de Uairén (a two-day drive from Caracas) or from Brazil. Some locations can be reached only by four-wheel-drive vehicles. The indigenous village of Kavac, in Canaima National Park, is accessible only by air.

Gallery
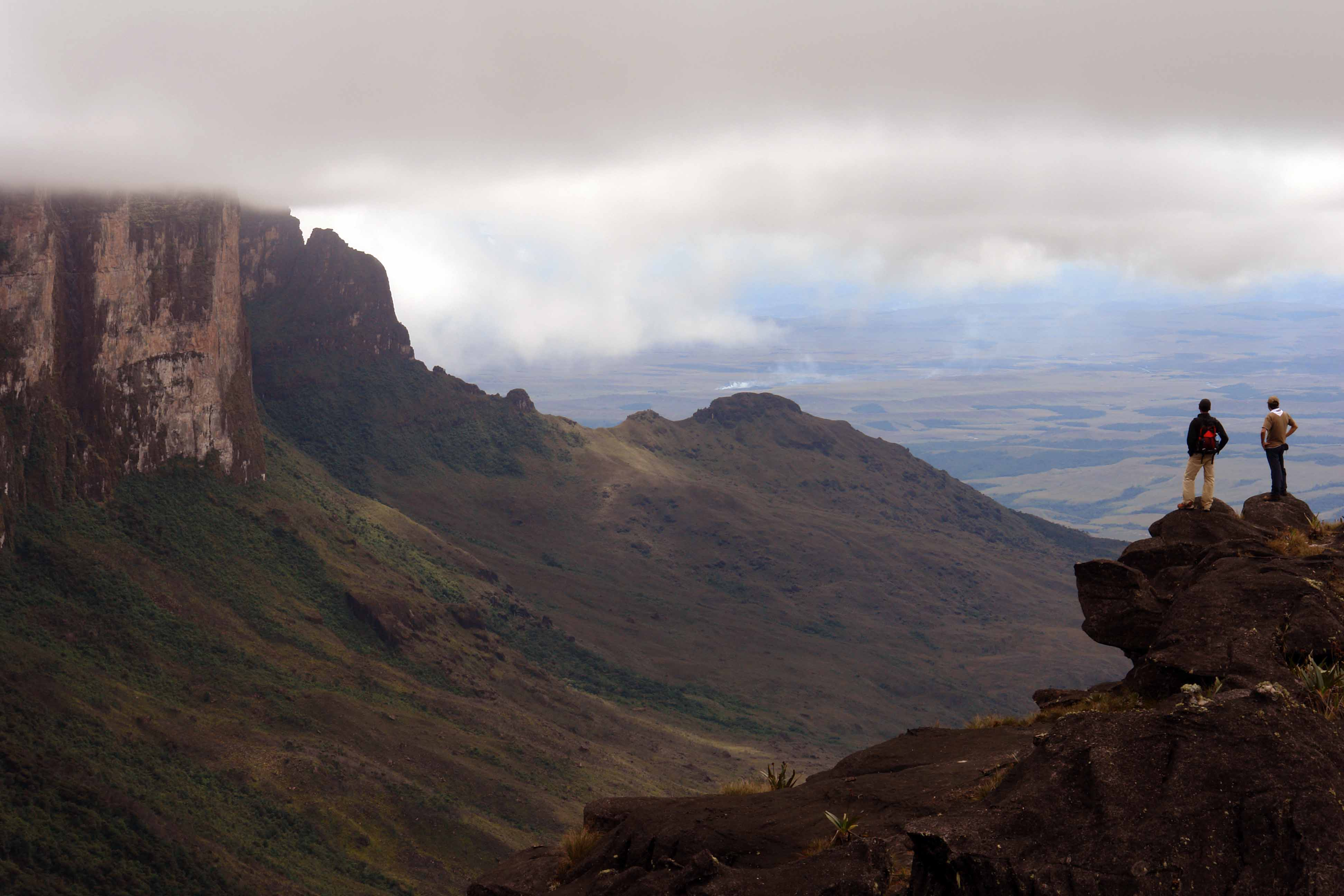
View from Mount Roraima

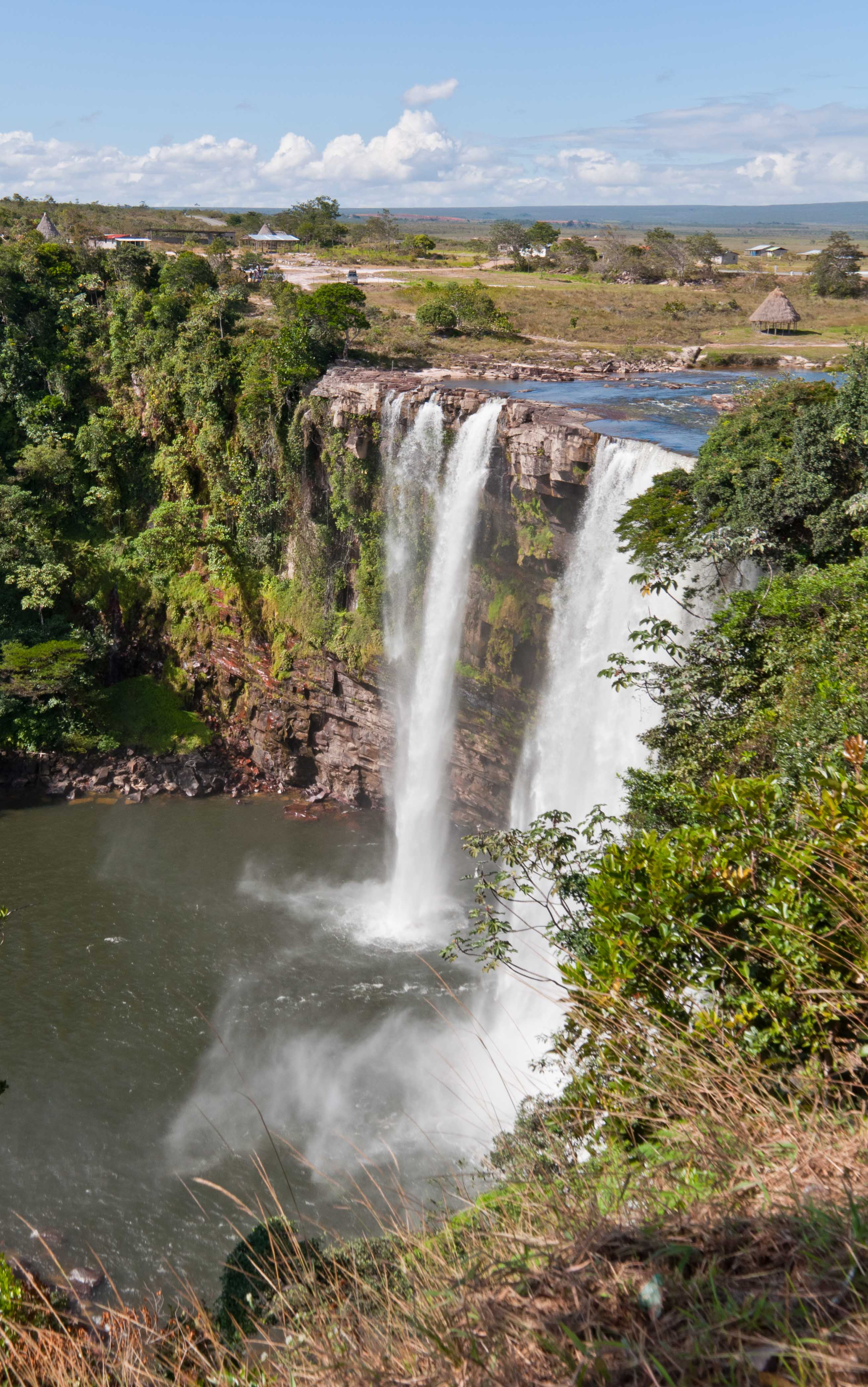
Kamá Falls

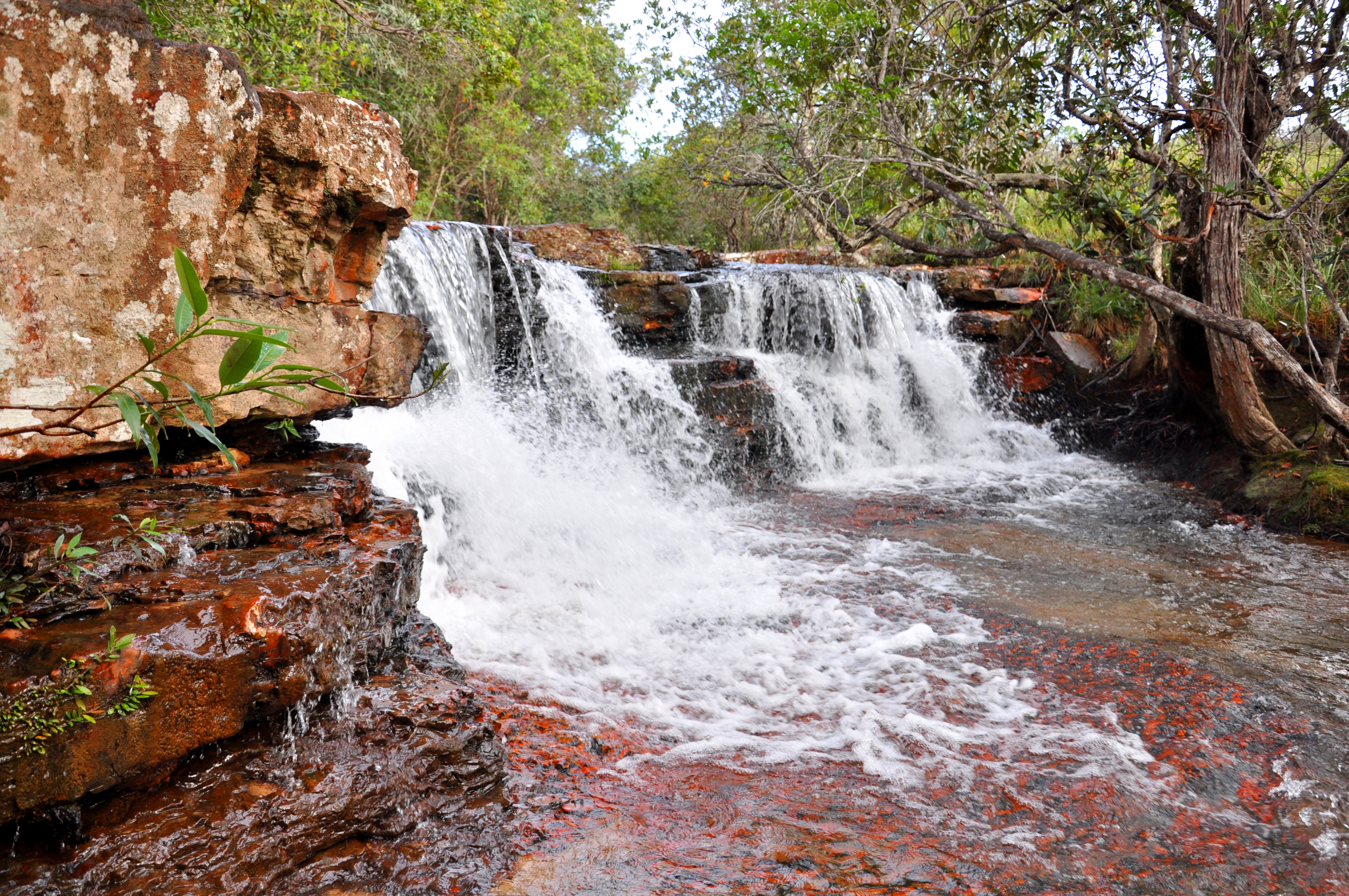
Jasper Creek

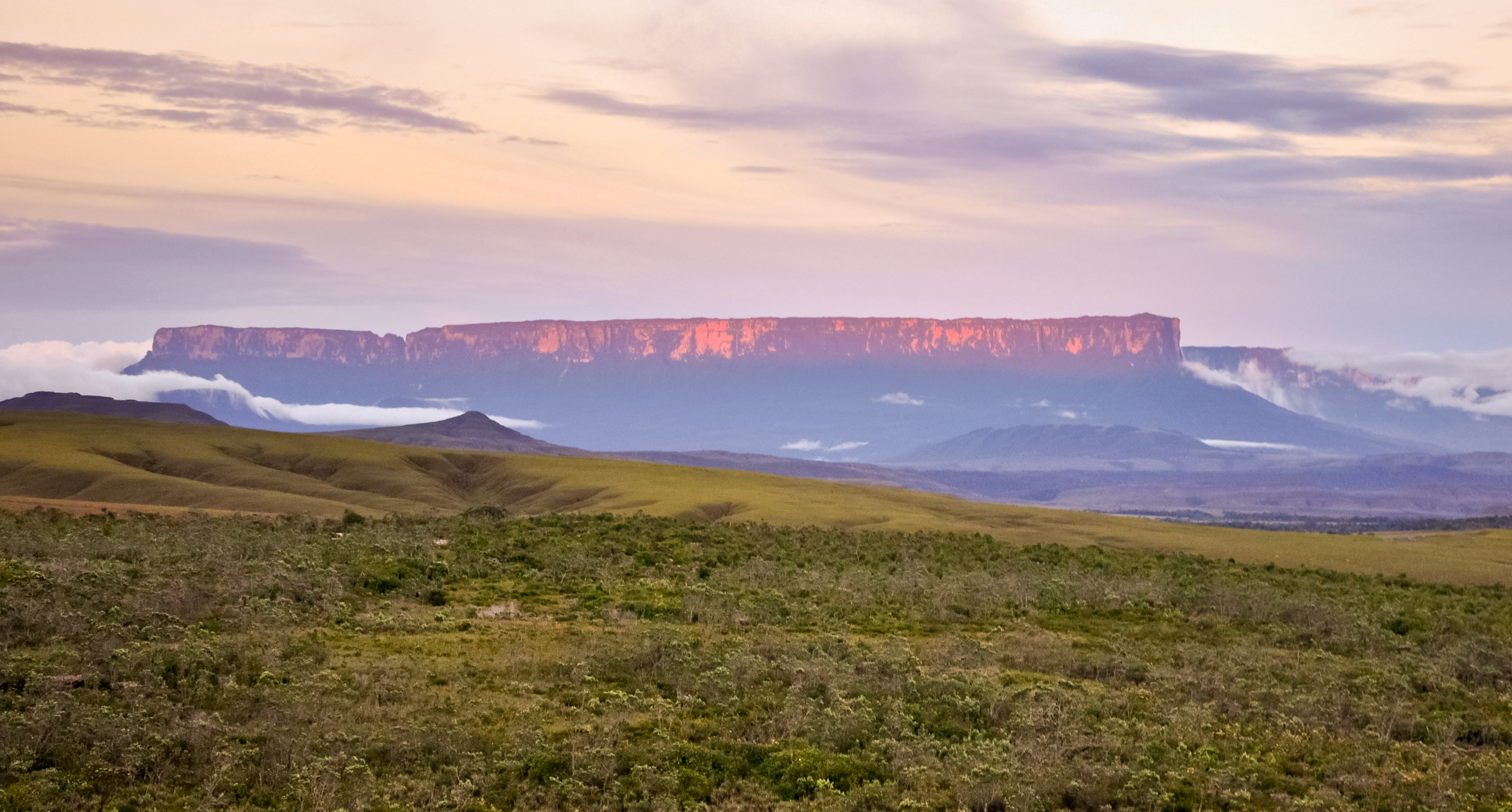
Kukenan tepui at sunset

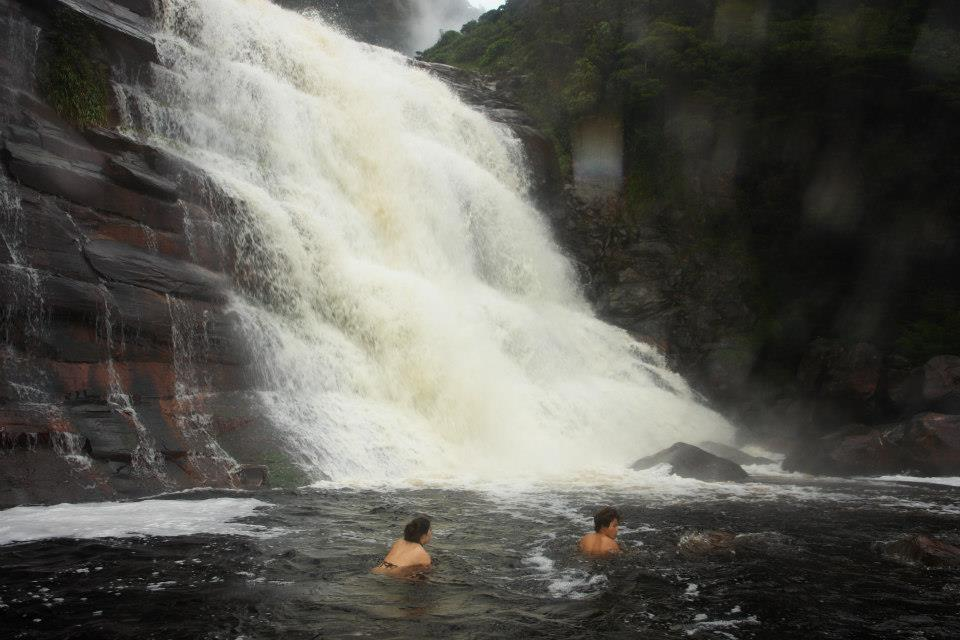
Gran Sabana Falls

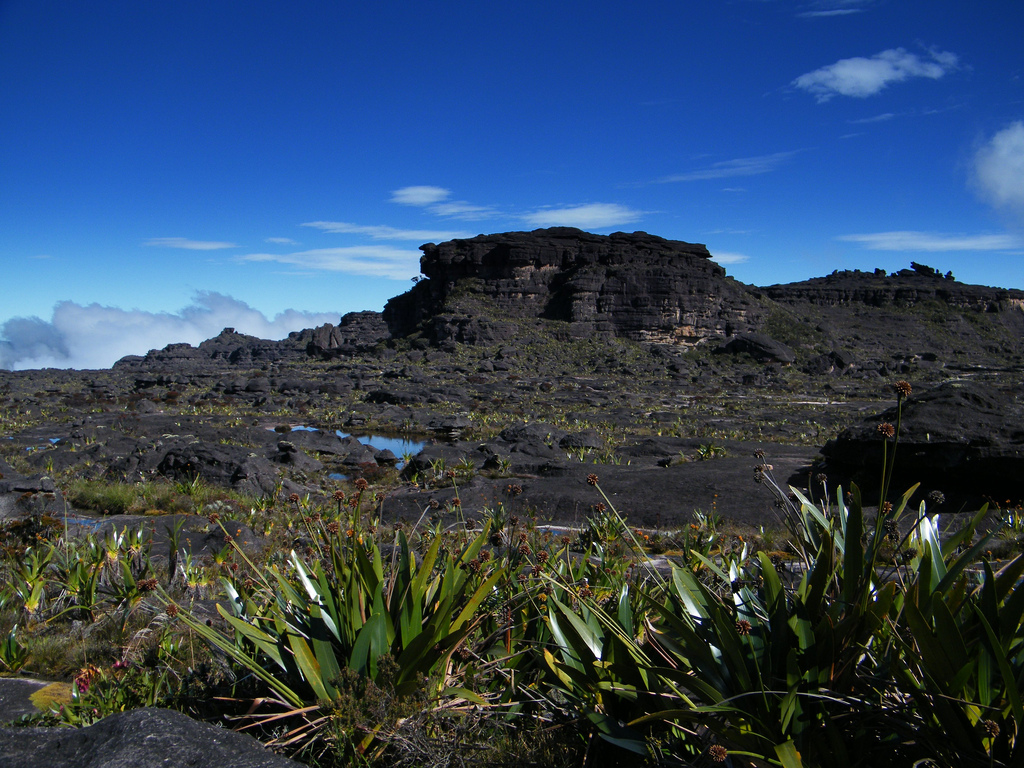
Blue Rock, the highest point on Mount Roraima

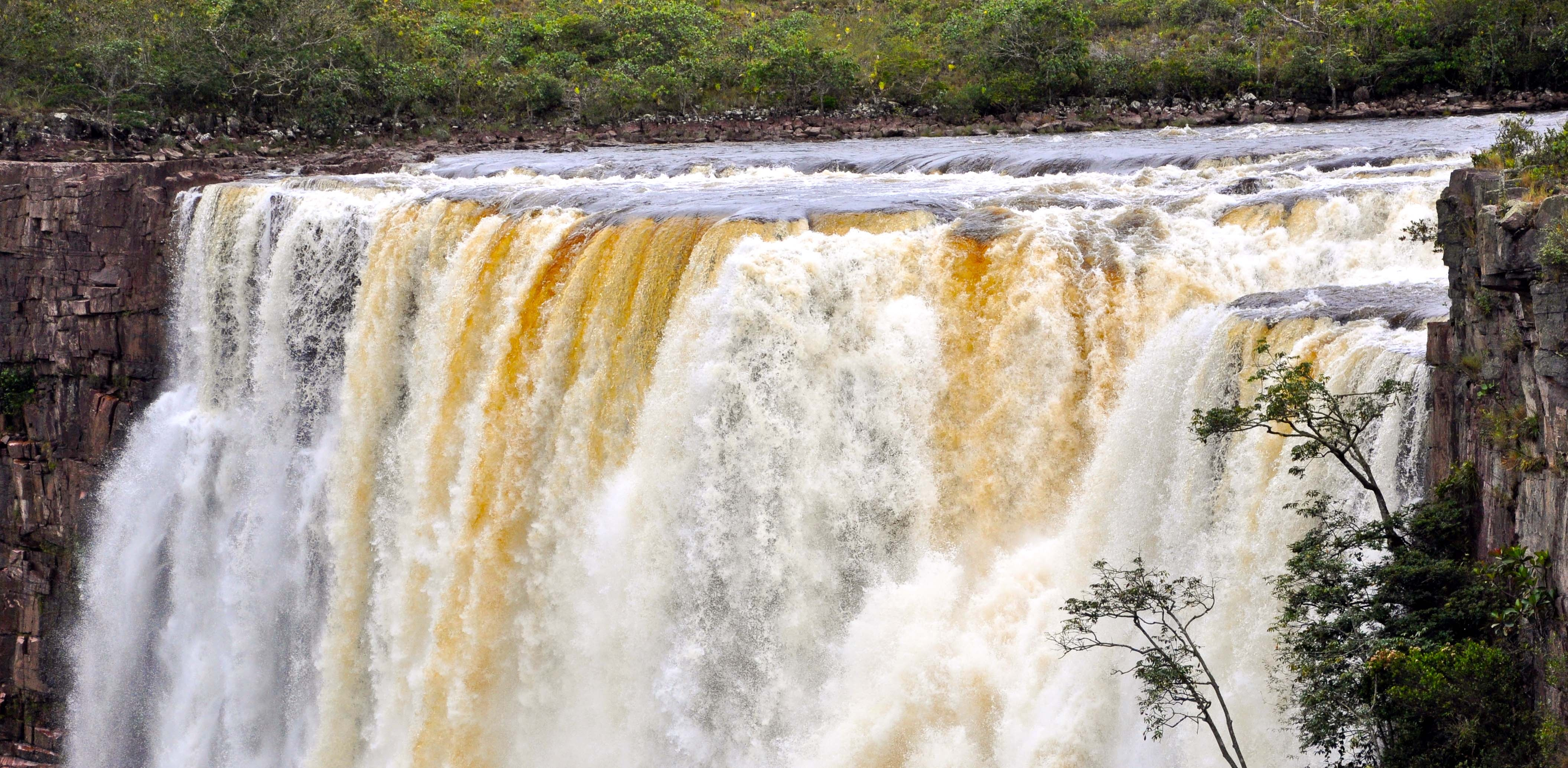
Upper Falls Aponwao

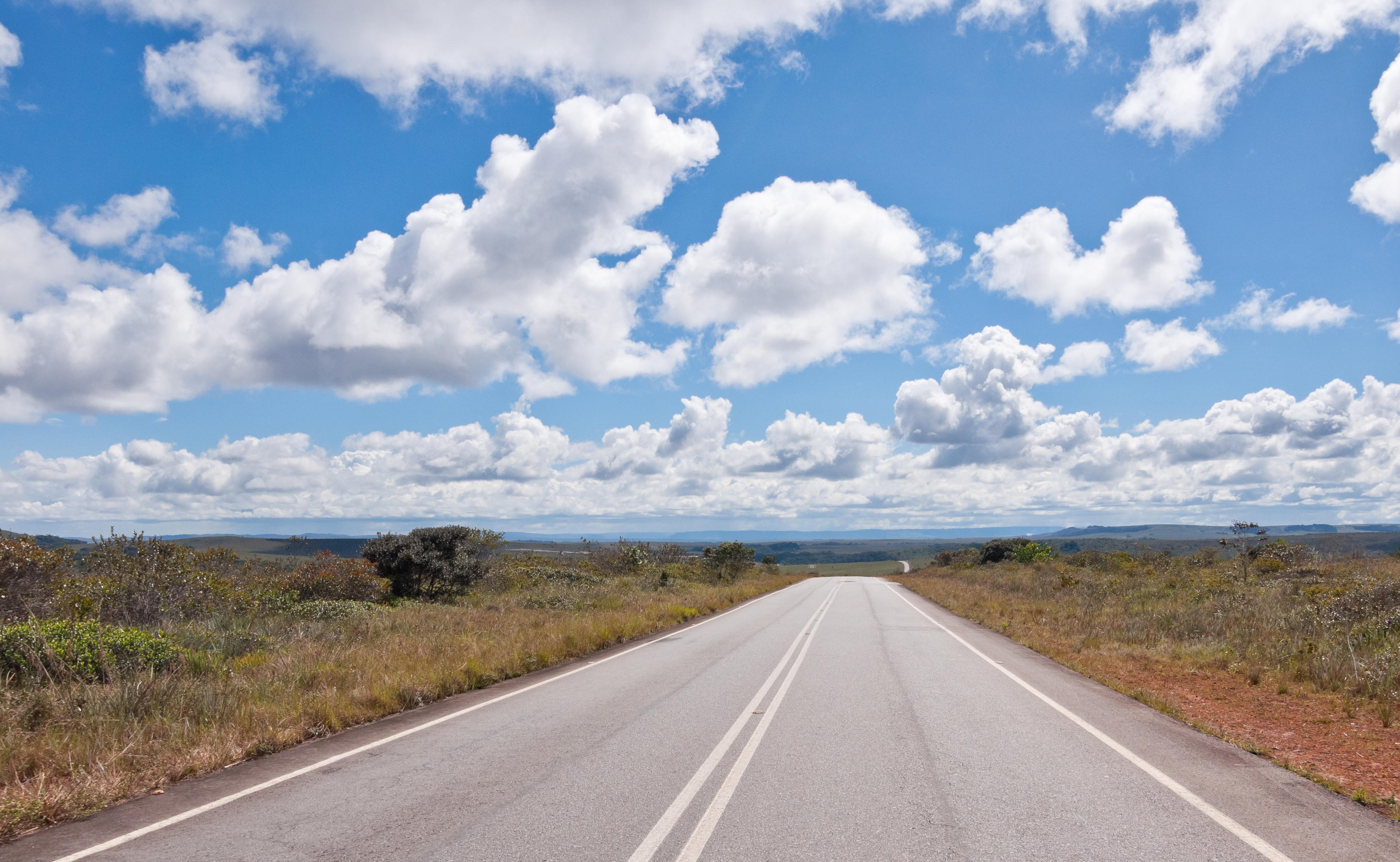
Troncal 10

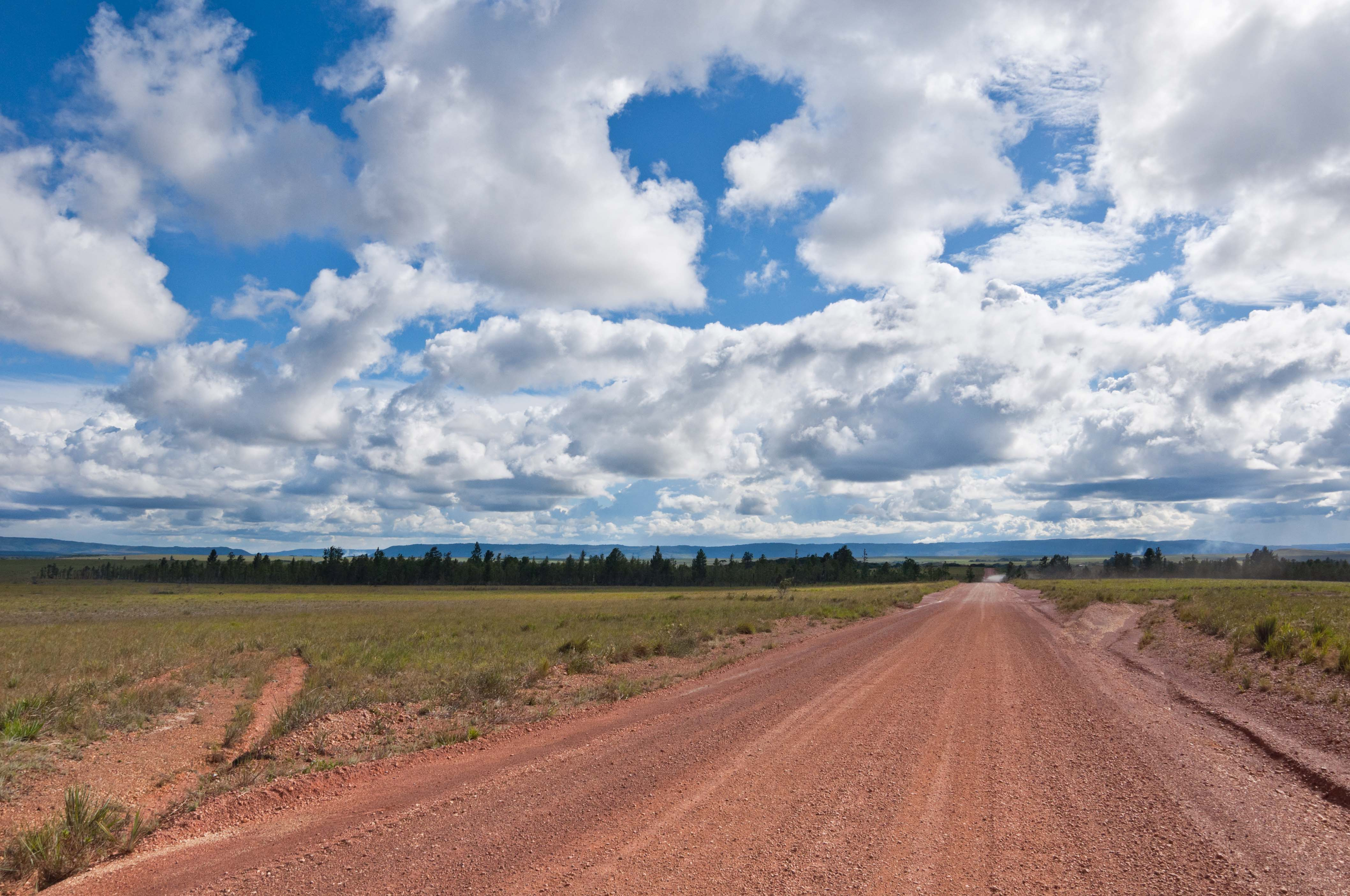
Dirt road to Liworiwo and its trails to the Aponwao Falls
