= Carrao-tepui =

Mountain in Venezuela

- Location within Venezuela

Highest point
- Elevation: 2,200 m (7,200 ft)
- Coordinates: 05°47′33″N 61°46′10″W

Geography
- Location: Bolívar, Venezuela

Carrao-tepui, also spelled Karrao, is a tepui in Bolívar state, Venezuela. It has a maximum elevation of around 2,200 metres (7,200 ft) and its densely forested summit plateau covers an area of 1.25 km^{2} (0.48 sq mi). Part of the Ptari Massif, it lies just northeast of neighbouring Ptari-tepui, with which it shares a common slope area of 28 km^{2} (11 sq mi), and north of the large ridge known as Sororopán-tepui.

== See also ==
- Distribution of Heliamphora
