= Ptari-tepui =

Mountain in Venezuela

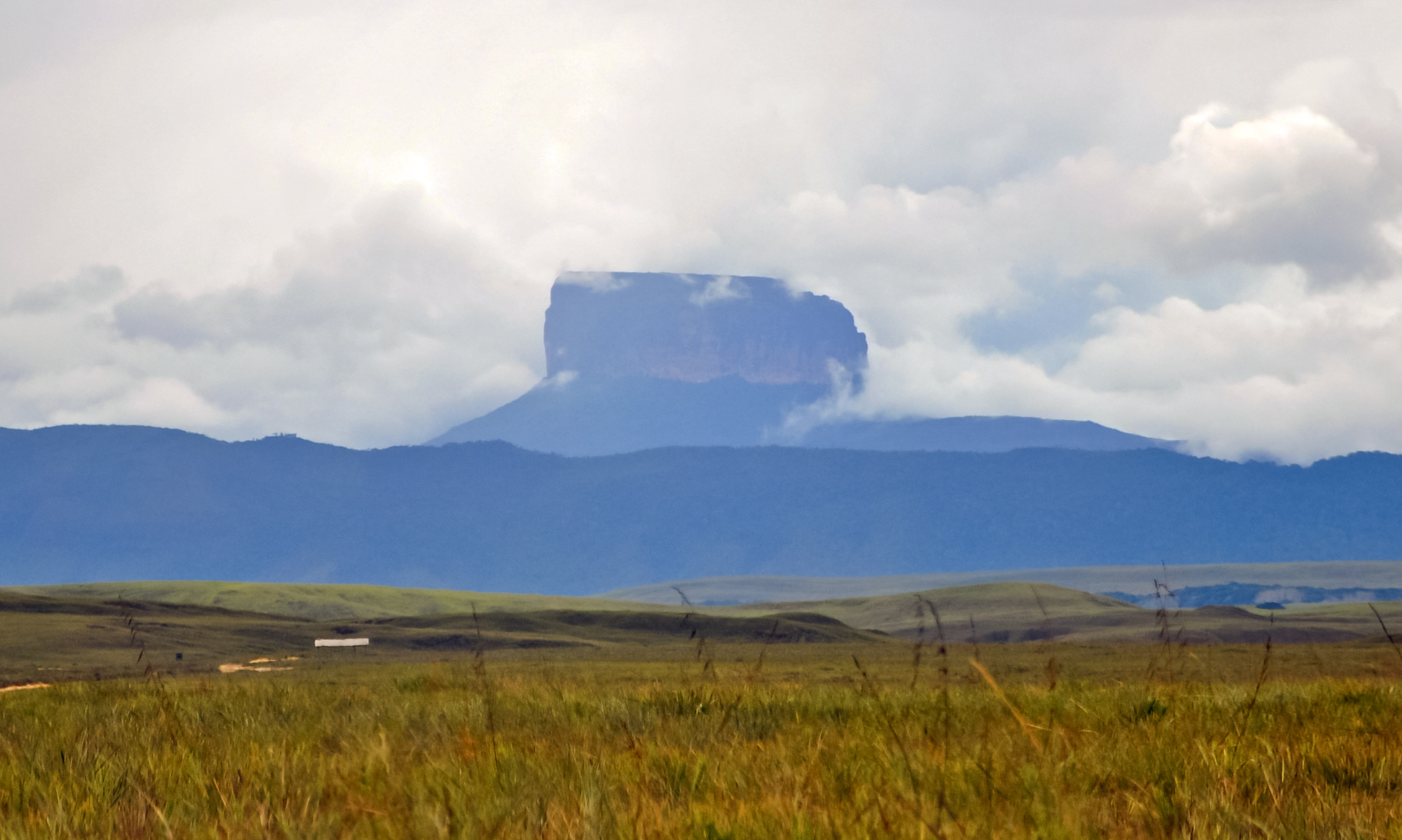
- Ptari-tepui viewed from the east

Highest point
- Elevation: 2,400 m (7,900 ft)
- Coordinates: 05°46′01″N 61°48′40″W

Geography
- Location within Venezuela
- Location: Bolívar, Venezuela

Ptari-tepui, also spelled Pu-tari and sometimes called Cerro Budare or Cerro del Budare, is a tepui in Bolívar state, Venezuela. Lying near the centre of the Sierra de Lema, it has a maximum elevation of around 2,400 metres (7,900 ft) above sea level. Its mostly bare summit plateau has an area of 1.25 km^{2} (0.48 sq mi). Though generally flat, distinctive erosional rock formations are found on the more dissected eastern edge of the summit.

== Description ==
Ptari-tepui gives its name to the Ptari Massif, which also includes Carrao-tepui to the northeast and a long ridge known as Sororopán-tepui to the southeast. As a whole, the massif has a summit area of around 2.5 km^{2} (0.97 sq mi) and an estimated slope area of 58 km^{2} (22 sq mi) (Carrao and Ptari together contributing 28 km^{2} (11 sq mi) and Sororopán, which is derived from a separate basement, a further 30 km^{2} (12 sq mi)). The massif is situated entirely within the bounds of Canaima National Park.

Ptari-tepui is a prime example of the classic tepui shape, having an almost perfectly flat-topped summit and near-vertical walls. This characteristic profile is said to recall the shape of a budare, a type of griddle used for making cassava bread, and is the source of its Pemón-derived name. For this reason it is also sometimes known as Cerro Budare or Cerro del Budare.

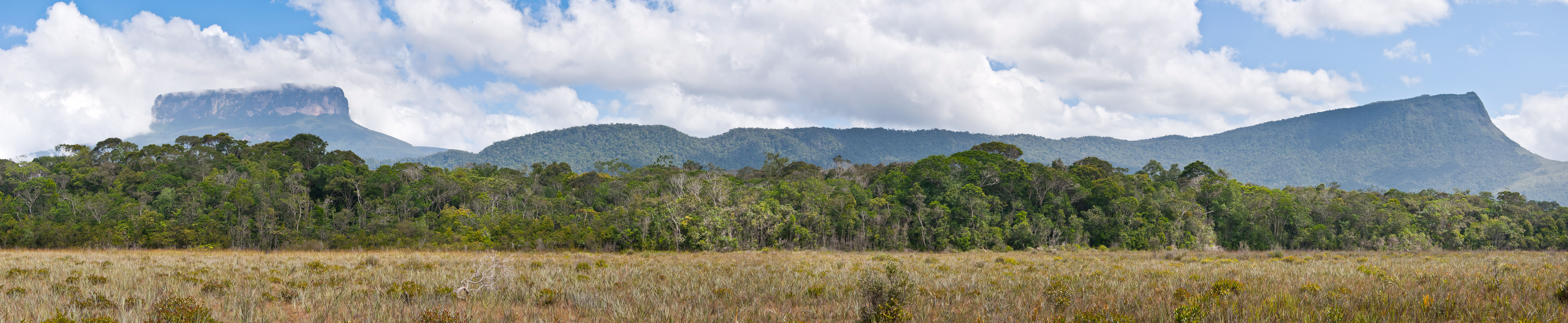
The flat, symmetrical peak of Ptari-tepui is visible on the left, with the long southwestern face of Sororopán-tepui extending to the right.

== See also ==
- Gran Sabana
- Distribution of Heliamphora
