= Coryphothamnus =

Scientific classification
- Kingdom: Plantae
- Clade: Tracheophytes
- Clade: Angiosperms
- Clade: Eudicots
- Clade: Asterids
- Order: Gentianales
- Family: Rubiaceae
- Genus: Coryphothamnus; Steyerm.
- Species: C. auyantepuiensis

Binomial name
- Coryphothamnus auyantepuiensis (Steyerm.) Steyerm.

Synonyms
- Pagamea auyantepuiensis Steyerm.

Genus of plants

Coryphothamnus is a monotypic genus of flowering plants in the family Rubiaceae. The genus contains only one species, viz. Coryphothamnus auyantepuiensis, which is endemic to southern Venezuela.
