= Aphanocarpus =

Scientific classification
- Kingdom: Plantae
- Clade: Tracheophytes
- Clade: Angiosperms
- Clade: Eudicots
- Clade: Asterids
- Order: Gentianales
- Family: Rubiaceae
- Genus: Aphanocarpus; Steyerm.
- Species: A. steyermarkii

Binomial name
- Aphanocarpus steyermarkii (Standl.) Steyerm. (1965)

Synonyms
- Pagamea steyermarkii Standl. (1953)

Genus of plants

Aphanocarpus is a monospecific genus of flowering plants in the family Rubiaceae. It is placed in the tribe Psychotrieae.

It holds only one species, viz. Aphanocarpus steyermarkii, which is endemic to Venezuela.
