= Sororopán-tepui =

- Location within Venezuela

Highest point
- Elevation: 2,050 m (6,730 ft)
- Coordinates: 05°41′40″N 61°45′37″W

Geography
- Location: Bolívar, Venezuela

Sororopán-tepui is a 10-kilometre (6.2 mi) long ridge in Bolívar state, Venezuela. It has a maximum elevation of around 2,050 m (6,730 ft) and its densely forested slopes cover an estimated area of 30 km^{2} (12 sq mi). The ridge has a southwest–northeast orientation and is characterised by a steep southern face. Part of the Ptari Massif, it lies just south of Carrao-tepui and neighbouring Ptari-tepui.

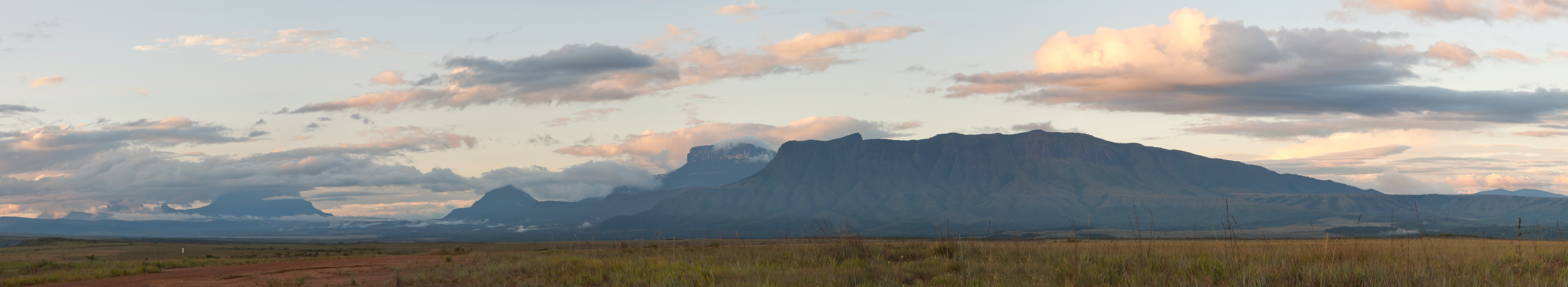
View from Kavanayén in the Gran Sabana, looking northwards. The large forested ridge is Sororopán-tepui, with Ptari-tepui visible just behind. Moving left is Moná-tepui and then, off in the distance, the Los Testigos chain, beginning with Kamarkawarai-tepui.

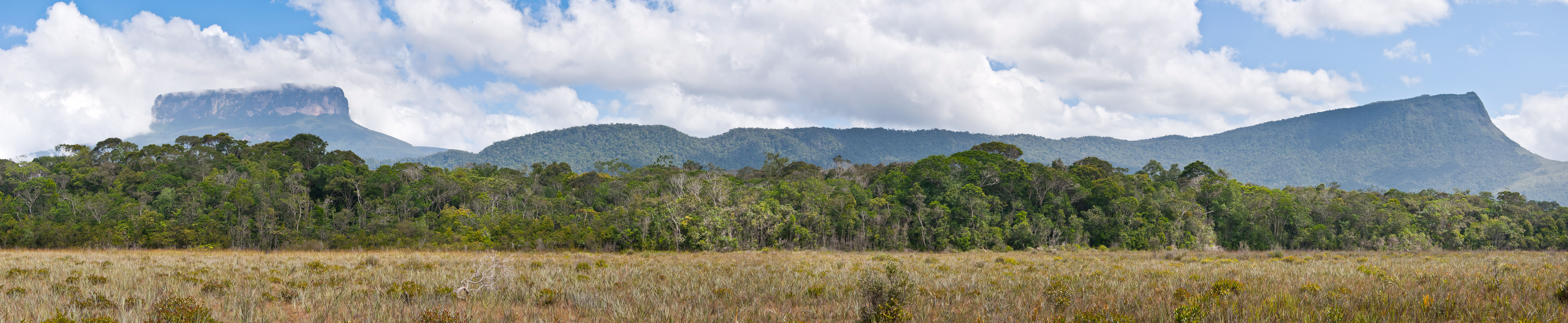
The flat, symmetrical peak of Ptari-tepui is visible on the left, with the long southwestern face of Sororopán-tepui extending to the right.

== See also ==
- Distribution of Heliamphora
