= Aromobates walterarpi =

Conservation status
- Critically Endangered (IUCN 3.1)

Scientific classification
- Kingdom: Animalia
- Phylum: Chordata
- Class: Amphibia
- Order: Anura
- Family: Aromobatidae
- Genus: Aromobates
- Species: A. walterarpi

Binomial name
- Aromobates walterarpi La Marca and Otero-López, 2012

Species of frog

Aromobates walterarpi, or Arp's rocket frog, is a species of frog in the family Aromobatidae. It is endemic to Mérida, Venezuela.

== Habitat ==
This frog had been found live near streams on mountains in cloud forests. Scientists first saw the frogs under rocks near a small stream near a town called Piñango, 2325 meters above sea level.

Scientists have not found the frog inside any protected areas, but Sierra de La Culata National Park is not far from the type locality.

== Reproduction ==
People hear male frogs calling from near roads. Scientists infer this frog has young the way other frogs in Aromobates do: The female frog lays eggs on land. The male frog carries the tadpoles to water after the eggs hatch.

== Threats ==
The IUCN classifies this frog as critically endangered, principally due to habitat loss. Much of the forested area in is range has been converted to farmland or space for livestock cultivation, such as cattle. Scientists also believe that water pollution and invasive trout may pose a threat. Because other frogs that live in the area, such as Atelopus pinangoi have suffered from the fungal disease chytridiomycosis, scientists infer that A. walterarpi's numbers may have been depleted by chytridiomycosis as well. A 2011 survey to the area revealed no adults or tadpoles.
