= Podocarpus pendulifolius =

Conservation status
- Endangered (IUCN 3.1)

Scientific classification
- Kingdom: Plantae
- Clade: Tracheophytes
- Clade: Gymnosperms
- Division: Pinophyta
- Class: Pinopsida
- Order: Araucariales
- Family: Podocarpaceae
- Genus: Podocarpus
- Species: P. pendulifolius

Binomial name
- Podocarpus pendulifolius J.Buchholz & N.E.Gray

Species of conifer

Podocarpus pendulifolius (pino carbón, pino hayuco) is a species of conifer in the family Podocarpaceae. It is endemic to northwestern Venezuela.

Podocarpus pendulifolius is known from the Cordillera de Merida in northern Andes, in the provinces of Edo Lara, Merida, Tachira, and Trujillo. It grows in montane rainforest, sometimes at high elevation just below the subalpine páramo, from 1,400 to 3,000 metres elevation. At elevation it may take a dwarfed form, but otherwise it may grow to 20 meters in height.
