= Orognaphalon =

Scientific classification
- Kingdom: Plantae
- Clade: Tracheophytes
- Clade: Angiosperms
- Clade: Eudicots
- Clade: Asterids
- Order: Asterales
- Family: Asteraceae
- Subfamily: Asteroideae
- Tribe: Gnaphalieae
- Genus: Orognaphalon; G.L.Nesom

Genus of flowering plants

Orognaphalon is a genus of flowering plants in the family Asteraceae. It includes four species native to Costa Rica, Colombia, and Venezuela.

Species are herbaceous non-stoloniferous perennials with erect stems, a basal rosette of leaves, and fibrous roots. They grow in high-elevation páramo grasslands in the northern Andes of Colombia and Venezuela, and the mountains of Costa Rica.

== Species ==
Four species are accepted.

- Orognaphalon grandiflorum G.L.Nesom – Sierra de Usme of Colombia, near Bogota
- Orognaphalon paramorum (S.F.Blake) G.L.Nesom – Serranía del Perijá of Colombia, Cordillera de Mérida Venezuela, and Costa Rica
- Orognaphalon rosulatum (S.Moore) G.L.Nesom – Sierra Nevada de Santa Marta of Colombia
- Orognaphalon santamartense G.L.Nesom – Sierra Nevada de Santa Marta of Colombia
