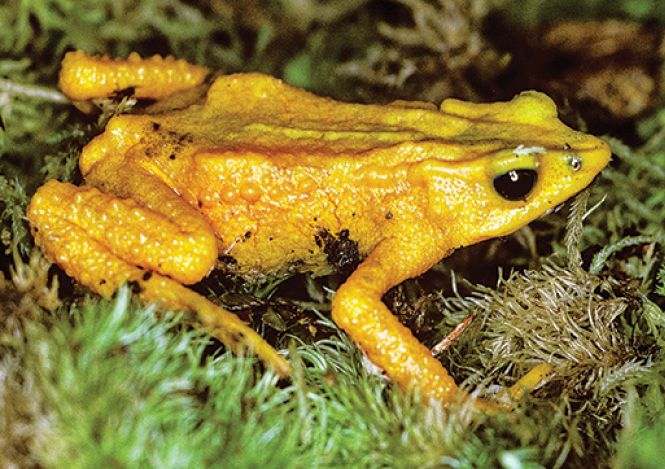

Conservation status
- Critically Endangered (IUCN 3.1)

Scientific classification
- Kingdom: Animalia
- Phylum: Chordata
- Class: Amphibia
- Order: Anura
- Family: Bufonidae
- Genus: Atelopus
- Species: A. carbonerensis

Binomial name
- Atelopus carbonerensis Rivero, 1972

Synonyms
- Atelopus oxyrhynchus carbonerensis Rivero, 1974 "1972"

= Atelopus carbonerensis =

Species of amphibian

Atelopus carbonerensis, also known as the Venezuelan yellow frog and La Carbonera stubfoot toad (in Spanish: ranita amarilla de La Carbonera), is a species of toad in the family Bufonidae. It is endemic to the Mérida Andes of Venezuela. Following an observation in 1998, it was feared extinct for nearly two decades until a single individual was sighted in 2014, followed by an observation of a mating pair in 2021.

== Description ==
Adult males measure 40–46 mm (1.6–1.8 in) and adult females 44–55 mm (1.7–2.2 in) in snout–vent length. The snout is projecting. The hindlimbs are long. Dorsal coloration is yellow with brown spots around the nostrils and, occasionally, on other parts of the body. The anterior part of the belly is scarlet red. There are dorsolateral rows of tubercles and a few scattered tubercles dorsally.

== Habitat and conservation ==
Atelopus carbonerensis is known from cloud forest at elevations of 2,000–2,800 m (6,600–9,200 ft) above sea level. Individuals have been found along streams, in which the tadpoles develop.

This species was once abundant, but declined drastically in the 1980s. Following an observation in 1998, this species was feared extinct for over two decades with targeted searches not producing any new sightings. The decline is probably caused by chytridiomycosis in combination with other factors, particularly habitat loss – little of the original cloud forest at the type locality remains. However a 2023 study publicized the chance observation of an individual in 2014, as well as an observation of a pair in amplexus in 2021, indicating that the species has survived and is continuing to reproduce, and may even be developing resistance to chytridiomycosis. All recent observations are from the Páramo El Tambor in Mérida. The range of this species is partly within the Sierra La Culata National Park.
