= Aromobates duranti =

Conservation status
- Critically Endangered (IUCN 3.1)

Scientific classification
- Kingdom: Animalia
- Phylum: Chordata
- Class: Amphibia
- Order: Anura
- Family: Aromobatidae
- Genus: Aromobates
- Species: A. duranti

Binomial name
- Aromobates duranti (Péfaur, 1985)

Synonyms
- Colostethus duranti Péfaur, 1985; Nephelobates duranti (Péfaur, 1985)

Species of frog

Aromobates duranti (common name: Durant's rocket frog) is a species of frog in the family Aromobatidae. It is endemic to Venezuela where it is known from near La Culata in the Cordillera de Mérida.

== Habitat ==
This frog is awake during the day. It lives near streams in páramo, subpáramo, and cloud forests. The frog prefers well-shaded areas with vegetation and rocks. The frog occasionally lives in stagnant water. Scientists observed the frog between 2600 and 3000 meters above sea level.

The frog lives near one protected area, Sierra de La Culata National Park, but scientists have not confirmed its presence there.

== Reproduction ==
The male protects the eggs that are laid on land. After hatching, the male carries the tadpoles on his back to water where they develop further.

== Threats ==
The IUCN classifies this species as critically endangered. Scientists attribute its decline to synergistic effects from a few phenomina that took place or began in the 1980s: The El Niño ocean current altered the weather in the frog's range, making it drier. At the same time, the dangerous fungus Batrachochytrium dendrobatidis was introduced to the area, bringing the risk of chytridiomycosis. Climate change might have exacerbated this. The area is also subject to habitat loss and degradation associated with human use and infrastructure and the diversion of streams for water. Tourists also visit the area, leaving their solid waste behind.

Scientists captured some of the frogs for the captive breeding program at the REVA Conservation Center.
