= Aromobates ornatissimus =

Conservation status
- Endangered (IUCN 3.1)

Scientific classification
- Kingdom: Animalia
- Phylum: Chordata
- Class: Amphibia
- Order: Anura
- Family: Aromobatidae
- Genus: Aromobates
- Species: A. ornatissimus

Binomial name
- Aromobates ornatissimus Barrio-Amorós, Rivero, and Santos, 2011

Species of frog

Aromobates ornatissimus, the ornate cloud frog, is a species of frog in the family Aromobatidae. It lives in Trujillo, Venezuela.

== Description ==
This is the only non-aposomatic frog in Aromobates to have bright green coloration and patterning. It also has dark ventrolateral stripes but lacks the pale stripes shown by many of its congeners.

== Habitat ==
This diurnal frog lives in riparian habitats, specifically narrow streams on mountains in dwarf cloud forests. Because it has also been found near streams that flow through grassy pastureland, scientists conclude that it has at least some tolerance to habitat disturbance. Scientists first observed this frog in Las Palmas in Carache, but it has been found in other areas since then, all between 1,139 and 2,394 meters above sea level.

The frog's range has some overlap with Dinira National Park but there are no formal reports of the frog within its borders.

== Reproduction ==
The male frog calls from concealed places in aquatic plants, beneath rocks, or behind waterfalls, or sometimes in the forest far from water. Scientists infer that the rest of the reproductive process takes place as with other frogs in Aromobates: The female frog lays her eggs on land and that the male frogs carry the tadpoles to water.

== Threats ==
The IUCN classifies this frog as endangered. It suffers from habitat loss in favor of small-scale agriculture and large-scale pasturage. Agrochemicals, waste from humans and cow manure, and other pollution can enter the streams where the frogs live. Humans also divert streams for irrigation and other purposes. Scientists also cite emerging amphibian diseases as a threat.
