= Aromobates leopardalis =

Conservation status
- Critically endangered, possibly extinct (IUCN 3.1)

Scientific classification
- Kingdom: Animalia
- Phylum: Chordata
- Class: Amphibia
- Order: Anura
- Family: Aromobatidae
- Genus: Aromobates
- Species: A. leopardalis

Binomial name
- Aromobates leopardalis (Rivero, 1978)

Synonyms
- Colostethus leopardalis

Species of frog

Aromobates leopardalis (common name: leopard rocket frog, Mucubají skunk frog) is a species of frog in the family Aromobatidae. It is endemic to the Mérida of western Venezuela, with one population within the Sierra Nevada National Park.

== Habitat ==
Its natural habitats are páramo grassland and sub-páramo shrubland environments and cloud forest. It is usually found within grasses and frailejones (Espeletia spp.), usually along and within streams. Scientists saw the frog between 2,400 and 3,300 metres (7,870 and 10,830 ft) above sea level.

Scientists have seen the frog in Parque Nacional Sierra Nevada.

== Odor ==
Both adults and tadpoles can create smells that are unpleasant to the human nose.

== Threats ==
This species has not been seen in at least a decade. Scientists infer that chytridiomycosis may have caused a precipitous decline in this species population because it did so with another frog species that shares its habitat, Atelopus mucubajiensis. They also cite water pollution and introduced trout species as threats.
