= Aromobates ericksonae =

Conservation status
- Endangered (IUCN 3.1)

Scientific classification
- Kingdom: Animalia
- Phylum: Chordata
- Class: Amphibia
- Order: Anura
- Family: Aromobatidae
- Genus: Aromobates
- Species: A. ericksonae

Binomial name
- Aromobates ericksonae Barrio-Amorós and Santos, 2012

Species of frog

Aromobates ericksonae is a species of frog in the family Aromobatidae. It is endemic to Mérida, Venezuela.

== Description ==
The male holotype measured 21.7 mm in snout-vent length. The skin of the dorsum is dark brown in color. It has a light intraorbital spot. There are two cream-colored dorsolateral stripes from the nose over the eye to the sacral area. The flanks are brown-black in color near the stripes and grayer in color closer to the belly. There is another stripe with yellow spots on each side of the body. The upper lip is dark gray in color with white spots. The forelegs are gray-brown in color with some cream marks near where they meet the body. The front toes are gray. The hind legs are light brown in color with darker bars.

== Etymology ==
Scientists named the frog for Ronna Erickson from the University of Massachusetts.

== Habitat ==
This diurnal frog lives near streams in forests. Scientists observed the frog on the west side of the Cordillera de Mérida. Scientists saw the frog between 676 and 1193 meters above sea level.

Scientists have observed one subpopulation in a protected park: Parque Nacional Sierra de La Culata.

== Reproduction ==
The male frogs perch on the leaf litter and call to the female frogs.

== Threats ==
The IUCN classifies this frog as endangered. Its probable principal threats are habitat loss, pollution, and possibly the fungal disease chytridiomycosis, whose causative pathogen, Batrachochytrium dendrobatidis, has been found on other area frogs.
