= Aromobates zippeli =

Conservation status
- Critically Endangered (IUCN 3.1)

Scientific classification
- Kingdom: Animalia
- Phylum: Chordata
- Class: Amphibia
- Order: Anura
- Family: Aromobatidae
- Genus: Aromobates
- Species: A. zippeli

Binomial name
- Aromobates zippeli Barrio-Amorós and Santos, 2012

Species of frog

Aromobates zippeli, or Mucuchíes' frog, is a species of frog in the family Aromobatidae. It is endemic to Mérida, Venezuela.

== Description ==
One male holotype was recorded at 25 mm in snout-vent length. These frogs have short hind legs. The skin of the dorsum is olive green, brown, or black. There are two light yellow, brown, or green stripes on the sides of the body, always lighter than the dorsum. The flanks are black or dark brown with white spots. Any part of the top of the frog's body can have spots on it, and the spots can be blue.

== Habitat ==
This diurnal frog lives near streams in dry forests on mountains. Scientists first found the frog near a town called Mucuchíe. Scientists have observed the frog between 2270 and 3240 meters above sea level.

== Reproduction ==
The female frog lays eggs on leaf litter, and the male frog guards them. After the eggs hatch, the male frog carries the tadpoles to water.

== Threats ==
The IUCN classifies this frog as critically endangered. Its principal threat is extreme habitat loss and habitat fragmentation. Human beings have cut down most of the forest to build farms, and agrochemicals from these farms pollute the water. The frog is also subject to disease. Capture specimens have shown high numbers of nematode parasites. Scientists do not know whether the fungus Batrachochytrium dendrobatidis, which causes chytridiomycosis, has had a large impact on this population.

Scientists captured thirty frogs from the wild and brought them to the Rescue of Endangered Venezuelan Amphibians Center (REVA) for a captive breeding program.
