= Apure–Villavicencio dry forests =

Ecoregion in South America

Apure–Villavicencio dry forests (NT0201)
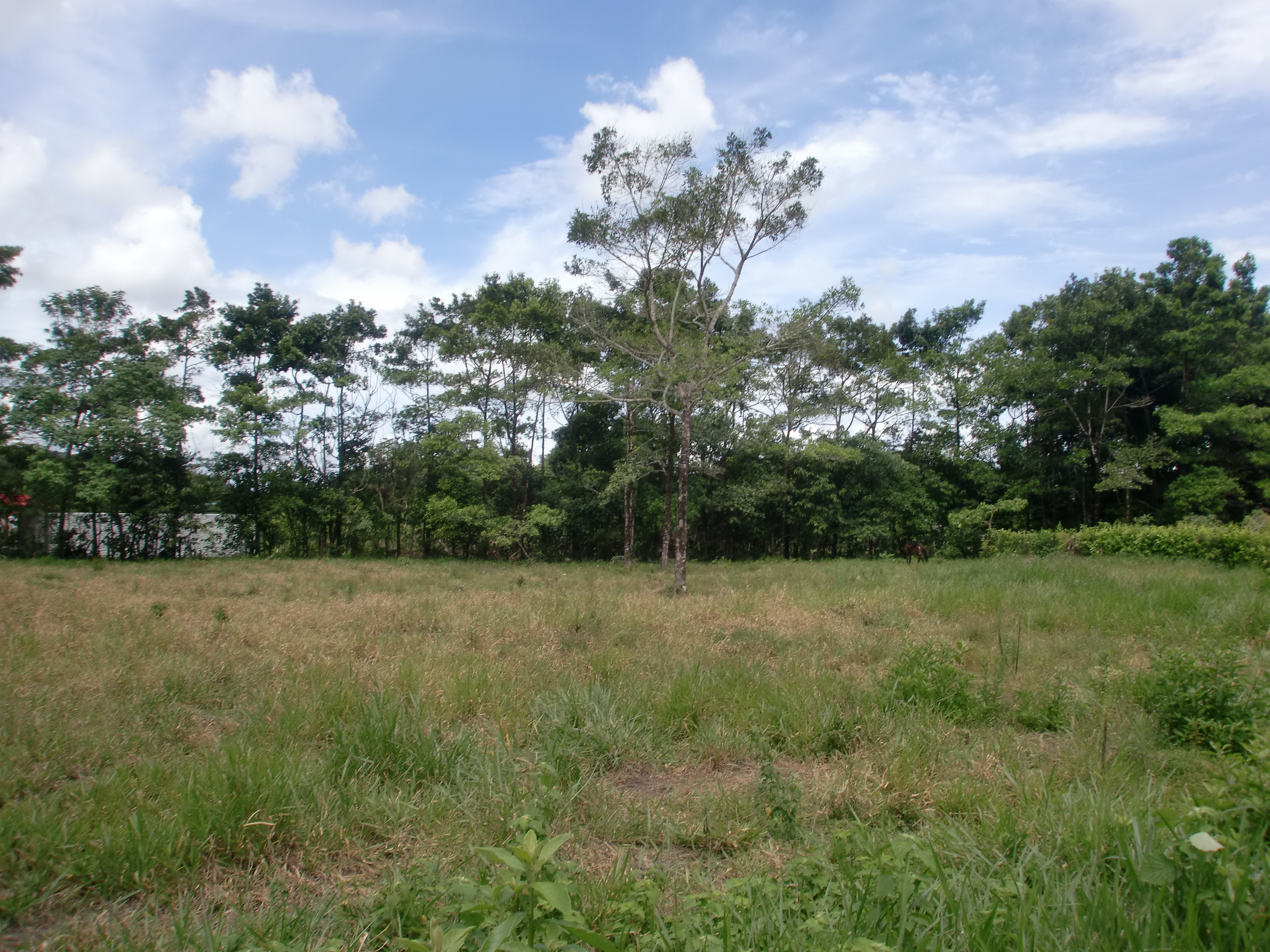
- Landscape within the city of Villavicencio

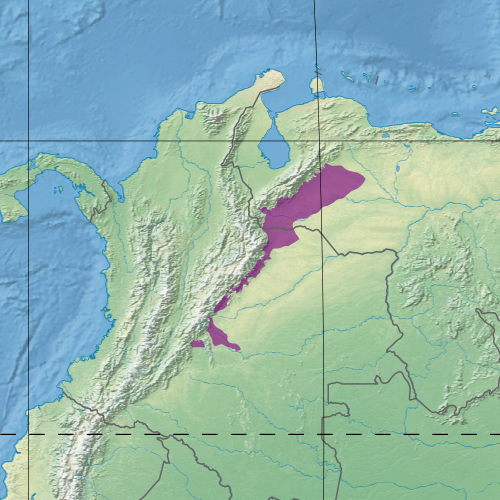
- Ecoregion territory (in purple)

Ecology
- Realm: Neotropical
- Biome: Tropical and subtropical dry broadleaf forests

Geography
- Area: 68,376 km^{2} (26,400 sq mi)
- Countries: Venezuela; Colombia
- Coordinates: 6.598°N 71.396°W
- Climate type: Aw: equatorial, winter dry

The Apure–Villavicencio dry forests (NT0201) is an ecoregion in Venezuela and Colombia to the east of the eastern cordillera of the Andes. The ecoregion covers the transition zone between montane forests in the Andes and the llanos, or lowland grasslands. It has been severely degraded by deforestation, farming and ranching. The remnants are poorly protected.

== Geography ==
=== Location ===
The Apure–Villavicencio dry forests ecoregion runs along the eastern edge of the Andes of Colombia and Venezuela from the southwest to the northeast. It has an area of 6,837,568 hectares (16,896,000 acres). It forms a broad band between the mountains and grasslands in the north that becomes narrower further south. In Venezuela it covers parts of the states of Portuguesa, Barinas, and Apure, and in Colombia it lies in the departments of Arauca, Casanare, and Meta.

Along the southeast and northern margin the dry forests ecoregion gives way to the Llanos ecoregion. To the northwest it merges into the Venezuelan Andes montane forests along the Venezuelan Andes, and the Cordillera Oriental montane forests along the Cordillera Oriental of the Colombian Andes. In the extreme south it merges into the Caquetá moist forests.

=== Terrain ===
The Apure–Villavicencio dry forests ecoregion has an elevation of 130–400 metres (430–1,310 ft) above sea level, sloping up from the plains to the base of the mountains. In the departments of Casanare and Arauca there are alluvial fans that extend to the Llanos, with heavily drained soils that are acid and infertile.

=== Climate ===
The Köppen climate classification is "Aw": equatorial, winter dry. Annual average rainfall is 135 millimetres (5.3 in). Temperatures range from 19–33 °C (66–91 °F). At a sample location at coordinates 7.25°N 70.75°W yearly average mean temperature is just over 27 °C (81 °F). Mean monthly temperatures are fairly constant, ranging from 26 °C (79 °F) in July to 28.7 °C (83.7 °F) in March.

== Ecology ==
The ecoregion is in the neotropical realm, in the tropical and subtropical dry broadleaf forests biome. The forested lowland area in Venezuela between the Uribante and Arauca rivers at 100–200 metres (330–660 ft) of elevation has been described as a Pleistocene forest refuge with flora of the tropical lowlands.

=== Flora ===
The ecoregion is a transitional habitat between the montane forests of the Andes and the grasslands of the lowlands to the east, There are high levels of natural fragmentation of the seasonally dry tropical forests in the ecoregion. It originally contained a patchwork of premontane forest, gallery forest, dry forest and savanna. The plant formations have been much changed by humans. They include tall grassland, native semi-deciduous woodland and, mostly in Venezuela, deciduous thorn forest.

Species include Caesalpinia conaria, Cynophalla hastata, Capparis brasiletto, Cercidium praecox, Chloroleucon mangense, Coccoloba ramosissima, Jacquinia species, Mimosa species, Piptadenia flava, Poponax flexuosa, Poponax tortuosa and Prosopis juliflora. Species in the semi-deciduous woodland include Attalea maracaibensis, Pachira quinata, Ceiba pentandra, Cordia species, Crysophyllum sericeum, Guazuma tormentosa, Gustavia poeppigiana, Inga species, Macrolobium species, Mauritia flexuosa, Pouteria anibaefolia, Roystonea venezuelana, Spondias mombin, Tabebuia rosa and Trichilia maynasiana. Species in the tall grasslands include Acrocomia aculeata, Andropogon selloanus, Axonopus canescens, Byrsonima crassifolia, Byrsonima coccolobifolia, Curatella americana and Trachypogon plumosus.

The Uribante–Arauca forest refuge in Venezuela holds Amazon region species such as Capparis sola, Licania latifolia, Dichapetalum latiflium, Henrietella rimosa, Leandra aristigera, Maxillaria equitans and Piper hermannii. Plant species found only in the refuge are Inga thibaudiana, Machaerium paraense, Ormosia nobilis, Pterocarpus santalinoides, Miconia matthaei, Simaba paraensis and Aegiphila scandens. The Colombian alluvial fans holds 72 families of flora with 173 genera and 232 species. The family Rubiaceae has 59 species and the family Poaceae has 37 species.

=== Fauna ===
Fauna in the Colombian alluvial fans include 65 species of reptiles and 144 species of birds. Characteristic mammals include the Guajira mouse opossum (Marmosa xerophila), Hummelinck's vesper mouse (Calomys hummelincki) and the giant anteater (Myrmecophaga tridactyla). Endangered mammals include Geoffroy's spider monkey (Ateles geoffroyi) and mountain tapir (Tapirus pinchaque). Endangered amphibians include the frogs Allobates juanii and Allobates ranoides.

== Status ==
According to the IUCN Red List of Ecosystems the Llanos seasonal dry forests are considered "Endangered" due to historic declines in forest cover.

The World Wildlife Fund gives the Apure-Villavicencio dry forests ecoregion a status of "Vulnerable". Much of the original habitat has been deforested and replaced by farms and livestock ranches. The illegal cultivation of coca has degraded the environment in Colombia. On the Venezuela-Colombia border oil refineries have polluted the groundwater and the Arauca River with high levels of sodium.

As of 2002 of the original 69,802 square kilometres (26,951 sq mi) in Colombia and Venezuela an area of 54,066.9 square kilometres (20,875.3 sq mi) had been converted to agriculture (including ranching), leaving 15,735.1 square kilometres (6,075.4 sq mi), or 22.5%, with natural cover or extractive uses. Land use and land cover in Colombia were mapped between 2001 and 2010 using satellite images. There were net gains in 820 municipalities, mostly the moist forest biome, but net losses in 264 municipalities. The greatest loss of woody vegetation occurred in the Apure-Villavicencio ecoregion and the Llanos. A total of 691 square kilometres (267 sq mi) of woody vegetation was lost from the dry forests. The cause was expansion of intensive agriculture and cattle pasture, particularly in the foothills of the Arauca department.

A 2006 book reported that 4.8% of the 70,342.75 square kilometres (27,159.49 sq mi) ecoregion was protected. The 276,446 hectares (683,110 acres) Sierra Nevada National Park in the north of the region protects páramo and moist forest as well as some dry forest. The 630,000 hectares (1,600,000 acres) Serranía de la Macarena National Park includes savanna, dry forest, tropical lowland forest and montane forest. Parts of the park have been damaged by migrants and by poor management. The 201,785 hectares (498,620 acres) Tinigua National Park between the Serranía de la Macarena and the Cordillera Oriental protects some dry forest, but mostly holds tropical lowland forest. The Serranía de la Macarena and Tinigua parks have been affected by logging and hunting.

== Sources ==
- "Apure-Villavicencio dry forests", Global Species, Myers Enterprises II
- De Ferranti, David M. (1 January 2005), Beyond the City: The Rural Contribution to Development, World Bank Publications, ISBN 978-0-8213-6097-2
- Dirzo, Rodolfo; Young, Hillary S.; Mooney, Harold A.; Ceballos, Gerardo (26 September 2012), Seasonally Dry Tropical Forests: Ecology and Conservation, Island Press, ISBN 978-1-61091-021-7
- Locklin, Claudia, Northern South America: Colombia and Venezuela (NT0201), WWF: World Wildlife Fund
- Sánchez-Cuervo, AM; Aide, TM; Clark, ML; Etter, A (2012), "Land Cover Change in Colombia: Surprising Forest Recovery Trends between 2001 and 2010", PLOS ONE, 7 (8:: e43943) e43943, Bibcode:2012PLoSO...743943S, doi:10.1371/journal.pone.0043943, PMC 3430633, PMID 22952816
- WildFinder, WWF: World Wildlife Fund
- Zimmerer, Karl S. (15 September 2006), Globalization and New Geographies of Conservation, University of Chicago Press, ISBN 978-0-226-98344-8
