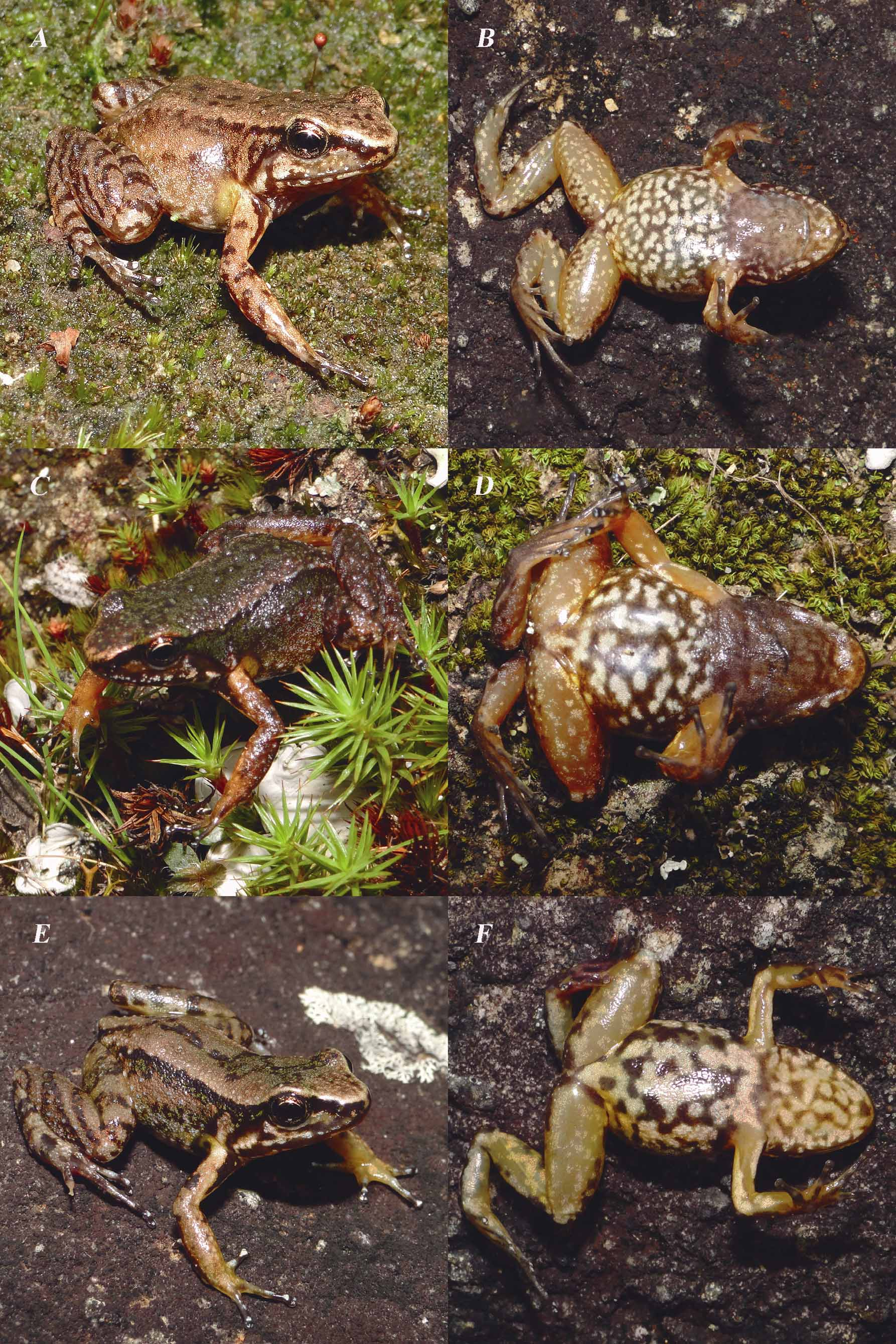
- Aromobates ornatissimus

Scientific classification
- Kingdom: Animalia
- Phylum: Chordata
- Class: Amphibia
- Order: Anura
- Family: Aromobatidae
- Subfamily: Aromobatinae
- Genus: Aromobates; Myers, Paolillo-O., and Daly, 1991

Type species
- Aromobates nocturnus Myers, Paolillo-O., and Daly, 1991

Diversity
- 18 species (see text)

Synonyms
- Nephelobates La Marca, 1994

= Aromobates =

Genus of amphibians

Aromobates, sometimes known as the skunk frogs, is a genus of frogs from the Andes of Venezuela and Colombia. Originally a monotypic genus consisting of the skunk frog, Aromobates nocturnus alone, it was later expanded to include Nephelobates. These frogs are difficult to differentiate from Allobates without using molecular markers.

== Etymology ==
The generic name derives from the Latin aroma, meaning "sweet odor". The odor of the type species, Aromobates nocturnus, is reminiscent of a skunk.

== Description ==
Aromobates are small to medium-sized frogs that have cryptic colouration. They have robust body form and basal to extensive toe webbing. For example, the relatively small Aromobates meridensis and Aromobates walterarpi are around 3 cm (1.2 in) in snout–vent length and have basal webbing only, whereas the relatively large Aromobates nocturnus (up to 62 mm (2.4 in) SVL in females) have webbed feet.

== Species ==
There are 18 species, many of them endangered:

- Aromobates alboguttatus (Boulenger, 1903) (Possibly Extinct)
- Aromobates cannatellai Barrio-Amorós and Santos, 2012
- Aromobates capurinensis (Péfaur, 1993)
- Aromobates duranti (Péfaur, 1985) (Critically Endangered)
- Aromobates ericksonae Barrio-Amorós and Santos, 2012
- Aromobates haydeeae (Rivero, 1978) (Possibly Extinct)
- Aromobates leopardalis (Rivero, 1978) (Possibly Extinct)
- Aromobates mayorgai (Rivero, 1980) (Endangered)
- Aromobates meridensis (Dole and Durant, 1972) (Critically Endangered)
- Aromobates molinarii (La Marca, 1985) (Critically Endangered)
- Aromobates nocturnus Myers, Paolillo-O., and Daly, 1991 (Critically Endangered)
- Aromobates ornatissimus Barrio-Amorós, Rivero, and Santos, 2011
- Aromobates orostoma (Rivero, 1978) (Critically Endangered)
- Aromobates saltuensis (Rivero, 1980) (Endangered)
- Aromobates serranus (Péfaur, 1985) (Possibly Extinct)
- Aromobates tokuko Rojas-Runjaic, Infante-Rivero, and Barrio-Amorós, 2011
- Aromobates walterarpi La Marca and Otero-López, 2012
- Aromobates zippeli Barrio-Amorós and Santos, 2012
