= Aromobates alboguttatus =

Conservation status
- Critically endangered, possibly extinct (IUCN 3.1)

Scientific classification
- Kingdom: Animalia
- Phylum: Chordata
- Class: Amphibia
- Order: Anura
- Family: Aromobatidae
- Genus: Aromobates
- Species: A. alboguttatus

Binomial name
- Aromobates alboguttatus (Boulenger, 1903)

Synonyms
- Nephelobates alboguttatus (Boulenger, 1903); Colostethus inflexus Rivero, 1980 "1978"

Species of frog

Aromobates alboguttatus (common name: white-dotted rocket frog) is a species of frog in the family Aromobatidae. It is endemic to the Andes in the Táchira and Mérida states, western Venezuela.The synonymy of Colostethus inflexus is still not fully resolved.

== Habitat ==
The natural habitat of Aromobates alboguttatus is clear, fast-flowing streams in Andean cloud forest. Scientists observed the frog between 1,600 and 3,090 metres (5,250 and 10,140 ft) above sea level.

Scientists have seen this frog in the protected parks Sierra Nevada National Park and Sierra de la Culata National Park.

== Reproduction ==
The male protects the eggs that are laid on land. After hatching, the male carries the tadpoles on his back to water where they develop further.

== Threats ==
The IUCN classifies this frog as critically endangered. Aromobates alboguttatus is threatened by habitat loss caused by agriculture, involving both crops and livestock, as well as by logging. Introduced trout are also a threat. It is also declining in undisturbed habitats, suggesting additional threats such as disease (e.g., chytridiomycosis).
