= Aromobates nocturnus =

Skunk frog

Conservation status
- Critically endangered, possibly extinct (IUCN 3.1)

Scientific classification
- Kingdom: Animalia
- Phylum: Chordata
- Class: Amphibia
- Order: Anura
- Family: Aromobatidae
- Genus: Aromobates
- Species: A. nocturnus

Binomial name
- Aromobates nocturnus Myers, Paolillo-O., and Daly, 1991

Species of amphibian

Aromobates nocturnus, the skunk frog, is a species of critically endangered frog endemic to Trujillo State in Venezuela. It is an extremely rare frog, and no sightings have been recorded since the original description in the early 1990s.

== Description ==
Aromobates nocturnus has a noxious but non-toxic skin secretion with skunk-like odor. Unlike the related poison dart frogs, this species is fully aquatic and much larger, up to 62 millimetres (2.4 in) in snout-vent length. It is nocturnal and usually found swimming or sitting in water.

== Taxonomy ==
It is commonly believed that the Aromobates nocturnus is the sister group of the Dendrobatidae due to its unique characteristics including its larger size, nocturnal and aquatic nature, and the presence of the adductor mandibulae externus superficialis muscle most often found in other Dendrobatids.

== Reproduction ==
The female frog lays eggs on land. The male frog protects the eggs. After hatching, the male carries the tadpoles on his back to water where they develop further.

== Habitat ==
The natural habitats of Aromobates nocturnus are small cold-water streams in cloud forests. Scientists know this frog from its type locality, Agua de Obispos, 2250 meters above sea level.

Scientists have observed the frog in one protected area: Parque Nacional Dinira.

== Threats ==
The IUCN classifies this frog as critically endangered and possibly extinct, with no more than fifty mature individuals alive at any one time. The species is threatened by habitat loss caused by agriculture, involving both crops and livestock. It could also potentially be affected by disease, such as chytridiomycosis.
