= Aromobates meridensis =

Conservation status
- Critically Endangered (IUCN 3.1)

Scientific classification
- Kingdom: Animalia
- Phylum: Chordata
- Class: Amphibia
- Order: Anura
- Family: Aromobatidae
- Genus: Aromobates
- Species: A. meridensis

Binomial name
- Aromobates meridensis (Dole & Durant, 1972)

Synonyms
- Colostethus meridensis Dole & Durant, 1972; Nephelobates meridensis (Dole & Durant, 1972)

Species of frog

Aromobates meridensis (common name: Mérida rocket frog) is a species of frog in the family Aromobatidae. It is endemic to the Cordillera de Mérida near Chorotal, Venezuela.

== Description ==
Aromobates meridensis measure 29–33 mm (1.1–1.3 in) in snout–vent length and have basal toe webbing.

== Habitat ==
The natural habitats of Aromobates meridensis are narrow streams with heavily vegetated banks that flow through cloud forest. Scientists observed the frog between 1800 and 3300 meters above sea level.

The species' known range includes one protected area and overlaps with another: the Protective Zone of the Capaz River and La Culata National Park, respectively.

== Reproduction ==
The male protects the eggs that are laid on leaf litter. After hatching, the male carries the tadpoles on his back to water where they develop further.

== Threats ==
This species is threatened by habitat loss in favor of agriculture and livestock rearing. Agrochemicals can also alter the oxygen levels in the bodies of water that the frogs rely on, and climate change may have changed rainfall patterns. The invasive bullfrog Lithobates catesbeianus can compete with the frog for reasources and prey on A. meredensis itself. L. catesbeianus also serves as a reservoir for the fungus Batrachochytrium dendrobatidis, which can give amphibians the fungal disease chytridiomycosis

Specimens of this frog have been captured and included in the captive breeding program at the Rescue of Endangered Venezuelan Amphibians Center.
