= Aromobates capurinensis =

Conservation status
- Data Deficient (IUCN 3.1)

Scientific classification
- Kingdom: Animalia
- Phylum: Chordata
- Class: Amphibia
- Order: Anura
- Family: Aromobatidae
- Genus: Aromobates
- Species: A. capurinensis

Binomial name
- Aromobates capurinensis (Péfaur, 1993)

Synonyms
- Colostethus capurinensis Péfaur, 1993

Species of frog

Aromobates capurinensis (common name: Sierra Nevada rocket frog, Capurí rocket frog) is a species of frog in the family Aromobatidae. It is endemic to the Sierra Nevada de Mérida, Venezuela.

== Habitat and reproduction ==
Its natural habitat is cloud forest. The male protects the eggs that are laid on land. After hatching, the male carries the tadpoles on his back to water where they develop further.

== Threats ==
The IUCN classifies this frog as data deficient. It is known solely from the type locality and has not been formally recorded since its time of collection. Scientists conducted surveys in its range in the 1980s and 1990s but have not found it again.
