= Cojedes River =

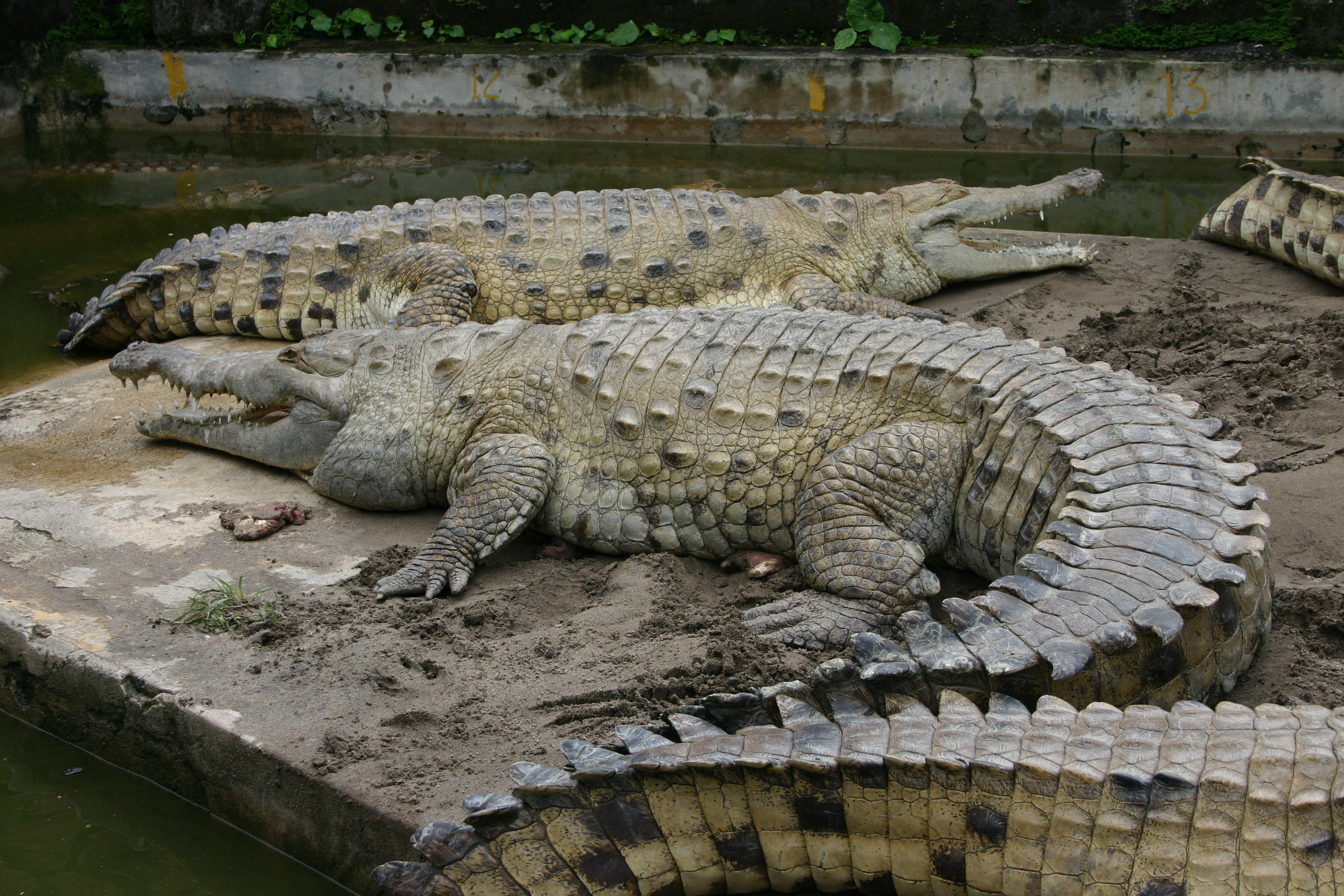
The Cojedes contains the main population of Orinoco crocodiles.

The Cojedes River (Spanish Rio Cojedes) is a tributary of the Orinoco River in central Venezuela. The Cojedes originates in Lara state, and flows southeast through a gap between the Cordillera de Mérida and the Cordillera de la Costa and across the Llanos grasslands of the Orinoco Basin to empty into the Apure River, which flows east to join the Orinoco. The river drains portions of the states of Lara, Yaracuy, Portuguesa, Cojedes, Barinas, and Guárico.

This river maintains the main Orinoco crocodile (Crocodylus intermedius) population, which is classified as critically endangered. Yellow-spotted river turtle nests have also been found along the Cojedes River, and artificial nesting sites have been created to help conservation efforts for this species as well.
