= Aromobates cannatellai =

Conservation status
- Critically Endangered (IUCN 3.1)

Scientific classification
- Kingdom: Animalia
- Phylum: Chordata
- Class: Amphibia
- Order: Anura
- Family: Aromobatidae
- Genus: Aromobates
- Species: A. cannatellai

Binomial name
- Aromobates cannatellai Barrio-Amorós and Santos, 2012

Species of frog

Aromobates cannatellai, the Las Escaleras' skunk frog, is a species of frog in the family Aromobatidae. It is endemic to Táchira, Venezuela.

== Description ==
One male holotype was found to be 22.6 mm long in snout-vent length. The head is longer than it is wide. The skin of the dorsum is dark with small brown spots near the front of the body. There are two dark brown stripes from the nose over the eye to the back of the body. The sides of the body are black with a stripe that can have white spots on it. There are other white spots on the top of the mouth and near where the front legs meet the body. The forelegs are black in color. The ventral areas are light gray in color.

== Etymology ==
Scientists named this frog for Dr. David Cannatella of the University of Texas at Austin for his work with amphibians and his cultivation of scientists in Latin America.

== Habitat ==
This diurnal frog lives near streams in forests. Scientists observed the frog between 1130 and 1300 meters above sea level.

== Reproduction ==
The male frogs hide under rocks or in crevaces or in leaf litter call to the female frogs. Scientists believe this frog has young in the same manner as other frogs in Aromobates: The female frog lays eggs on land near streams and the male frog carries the tadpoles to water.

== Threats ==
The IUCN classifies this frog as critically dangered and the Venezuelan Fauna Red List classifies it as near threatened. The key threats are habitat loss in favor of dams and tourism. People also make farms, which create water pollution. Emerging diseases could also kill this frog.
