= Aromobates saltuensis =

Conservation status
- Endangered (IUCN 3.1)

Scientific classification
- Kingdom: Animalia
- Phylum: Chordata
- Class: Amphibia
- Order: Anura
- Family: Aromobatidae
- Genus: Aromobates
- Species: A. saltuensis

Binomial name
- Aromobates saltuensis (Rivero, 1980)

Synonyms
- Colostethus saltuensis Rivero, 1980 "1978"

Species of frog

Aromobates saltuensis (common name: salty rocket frog and forest rocket frog) is a species of frog in the family Aromobatidae. It is endemic to humid lower montane forest of the Táchira state in western Venezuela. It is suspected in nearby Colombia.

== Habitat ==
This diurnal frog inhabits humid lower montane Andean forest, both primary and secondary. It has also been seen near streams that flow through grassy pastureland. Scientists observed the frog between 482 and 1500 meters above sea level.

Scientists have observerd one subpopulation in a protected area, Parque Nacional El Tamá.

== Reproduction ==
The male protects the eggs that are laid on land. After hatching, the male carries the tadpoles on his back to water where they develop further.

== Threats ==
Aromobates saltuensis is threatened by habitat loss caused by agriculture, involving both crops and livestock, as well as logging, water pollution, and infrastructure development. Its distribution occurrence is subject to strong anthropogenic pressure.
