= Aromobates serranus =

Conservation status
- Critically endangered, possibly extinct (IUCN 3.1)

Scientific classification
- Kingdom: Animalia
- Phylum: Chordata
- Class: Amphibia
- Order: Anura
- Family: Aromobatidae
- Genus: Aromobates
- Species: A. serranus

Binomial name
- Aromobates serranus (Péfaur, 1985)

Synonyms
- Colostethus serranus Péfaur, 1985; Nephelobates serranus (Péfaur, 1985)

Species of frog

Aromobates serranus (common name: Pefaur's rocket frog, sierra rocket frog) is a species of frog in the family Aromobatidae. It is endemic to Venezuela where it is only known from its type locality in the Libertador Municipality, Mérida.

== Habitat ==
Its natural habitats are mountain streams in cloud forest. Scientists observed the frog between 1,600 and 2,300 metres (5,250 and 7,550 ft) above sea level.

Scientists believe the frog may live in one protected place: Parque Nacional Sierra Nevada.

== Reproduction ==
The female frogs lay eggs on land. The males protect the eggs. After hatching, the males carry the tadpoles on their backs to water where they develop further.

== Threats ==
The IUCN classifies this frog as critically endangered and possibly extinct, with no more than 50 mature individuals alive at any one time. Aromobates serranus is threatened by habitat loss in favor of agriculture and livestock cultivation and by predation by invasive trout. However, because the population has also declined in undisturbed areas, scientists believe the fungal disease chytridiomycosis may also have contributed to the decline.
