= Aromobates molinarii =

Conservation status
- Critically Endangered (IUCN 3.1)

Scientific classification
- Kingdom: Animalia
- Phylum: Chordata
- Class: Amphibia
- Order: Anura
- Family: Aromobatidae
- Genus: Aromobates
- Species: A. molinarii

Binomial name
- Aromobates molinarii (La Marca, 1985)

Synonyms
- Colostethus molinarii La Marca, 1985; Nephelobates molinarii (La Marca, 1985)

Species of amphibian

Aromobates molinarii (commonly known as the Las Playitas rocket frog) is a species of frog of the family Aromobatidae. It is endemic to Venezuelan Andes near Cascada de Bailadores and Las Playitas in the Mérida state.

== Habitat ==
Its natural habitats are dry evergreen montane forests, where it lives along slow-flowing streams. The frog has been observed between 1800 and 2600 meters above sea level.

== Reproduction ==
The female frogs lay eggs on land. The male frogs protect the eggs until hatching. After hatching, the male carries the tadpoles on his back to water, where they develop further.

== Threats ==
The IUCN classifies this frog as critically endangered, giving it an estimated area of occupancy of eight square kilometers. Over the years, humans have converted nearly all its forest habitat to intensive agriculture or livestock cultivation.
