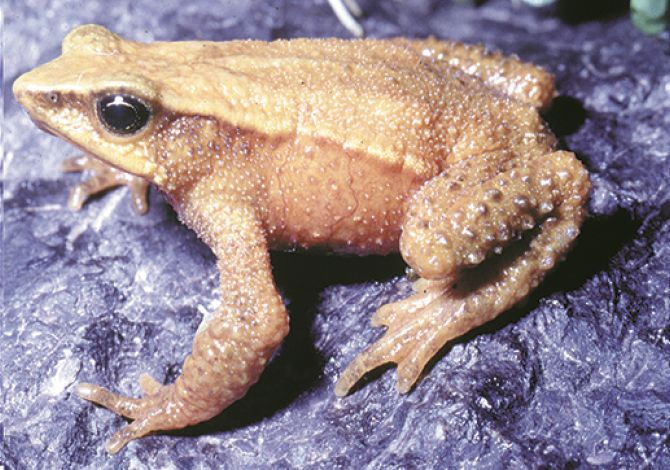

Conservation status
- Critically Endangered (IUCN 3.1)

Scientific classification
- Kingdom: Animalia
- Phylum: Chordata
- Class: Amphibia
- Order: Anura
- Family: Bufonidae
- Genus: Atelopus
- Species: A. mucubajiensis

Binomial name
- Atelopus mucubajiensis Rivero, 1974

= Atelopus mucubajiensis =

Species of amphibian

Atelopus mucubajiensis, also known as the Mucubaji stubfoot toad, is a species of toad in the family Bufonidae. It is endemic to the Mérida Andes of Venezuela. This once abundant species was last observed in 2004. It is likely extinct.

== Description ==
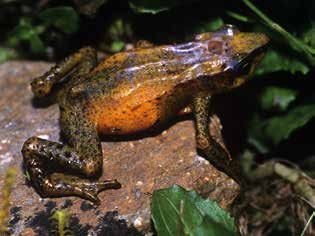
Female

Adult males measure 30–42 mm (1.2–1.7 in) and adult females 40–44 mm (1.6–1.7 in) in snout–vent length. The snout is not projecting. The hindlimbs are relatively short. The dorsal coloration is yellow, brown yellowish, or greenish brown, with irregular brownish spots that sometimes for an "X" pattern. The flanks are yellowish. Throat and anterior part of the belly are yellowish with brown spots; the posterior of the belly is red. There are dorsolateral rows of warts, and scattered warts elsewhere.

This species emits two types of calls, "pure tone calls" and "pure tone short calls". The latter was emitted by a male in amplexus with a female in a collection bag. The source of the former is uncertain and could even have been a female.

== Geographic range and habitat ==
This species has a very limited range of a merely few square kilometers at the type locality, in the Páramo de Mucubají, in the Sierra de Santo Domingo, Venezuelan Andes. Its altitudinal range is 2,300–3,500 m (7,500–11,500 ft) above sea level.

It inhabits páramo and sub-páramo environments. It is usually found within grasses and Espeletia, and along streams, its breeding habitat. At lower elevations it probably lives in shrubs. It has also been found in cloud forest, but this is not considered its preferred habitat.

== Conservation ==
Atelopus mucubajiensis was abundant in the 1970s and 1980s, but declined drastically thereafter. The last observation is from 2004 – despite later, targeted search efforts. The decline is likely because of chytridiomycosis together with other negative factors: introduced trout, introduced conifers, fires caused by humans, over collection, agriculture and infrastructure development, and pollution. It is not known whether this species still persists. Its range is mostly within the Sierra Nevada National Park.
