= Aromobates orostoma =

Conservation status
- Critically Endangered (IUCN 3.1)

Scientific classification
- Kingdom: Animalia
- Phylum: Chordata
- Class: Amphibia
- Order: Anura
- Family: Aromobatidae
- Genus: Aromobates
- Species: A. orostoma

Binomial name
- Aromobates orostoma (Rivero, 1978)

Synonyms
- Colostethus orostoma Rivero, 1978 "1976"; Nephelobates orostoma (Rivero, 1978)

Species of frog

Aromobates orostoma (common name: Tachira rocket frog) is a species of frog in the family Aromobatidae. It is endemic to Venezuela where it is only known from near its type locality, Boca de Monte in the Táchira state. Its natural habitats are mountain streams in cloud forest. The male protects the eggs that are laid on land. After hatching, the male carries the tadpoles on its back to water where they develop further.

Aromobates duranti is threatened by habitat loss caused by agriculture, involving both crops and livestock, and agricultural pollution.
