= Aromobates mayorgai =

Conservation status
- Endangered (IUCN 3.1)

Scientific classification
- Kingdom: Animalia
- Phylum: Chordata
- Class: Amphibia
- Order: Anura
- Family: Aromobatidae
- Genus: Aromobates
- Species: A. mayorgai

Binomial name
- Aromobates mayorgai (Rivero, 1980)

Synonyms
- Colostethus mayorgai Rivero, 1980 "1978"; Nephelobates mayorgai (Rivero, 1980)

Species of frog

Aromobates mayorgai (common name: Mayorga rocket frog) is a species of frog in the family Aromobatidae. It is endemic to the Mérida state of western Venezuela.

== Habitat ==
This diurnal, riparian frog lives in cloud forest. Scientists saw the frog between 793 and 2400 meters above sea level.

Scientists observed the frog in one protective area, the Protective Zone of the Capaz River and there is some range overlap with La Culata National Park.

== Reproduction ==
The female frog lays eggs on the leaf litter. The male protects the eggs. After hatching, the male carries the tadpoles on his back to water where they develop further.

== Threats ==
The IUCN classifies this frog as endangered. This species is threatened by habitat loss in favor of urbanization, agriculture, and livestock cultivation. Pesticides and other agrochemicals have also affected oxygen levels in the bodies of water that the frog inhabits. The introduced bullfrog Lithobates catesbeianus poses another threat because it can compete with A. mayorgai for food and prey on A. mayorgai itself.
