= Aromobates haydeeae =

Conservation status
- Critically endangered, possibly extinct (IUCN 3.1)

Scientific classification
- Kingdom: Animalia
- Phylum: Chordata
- Class: Amphibia
- Order: Anura
- Family: Aromobatidae
- Genus: Aromobates
- Species: A. haydeeae

Binomial name
- Aromobates haydeeae (Rivero, 1978)

Synonyms
- Colostethus haydeeae Rivero, 1978; Nephelobates haydeeae (Rivero, 1978)

Species of frog

Aromobates haydeeae (common name: El Vivero rocket frog) is a species of frog in the family Aromobatidae. It is endemic to Mérida and Táchira states in western Venezuela.

== Habitat ==
Its natural habitats are clear, fast-flowing streams in Andean cloud forest and the puddles alongside the streams. They may sometimes hide inside introduced Pennisetum clandestinum grasses. Scientists saw the frog between 1,825 and 2,670 metres (5,990 and 8,760 ft) above sea level.

Scientists believe this frog may live in Parque Nacional Los Páramos.

== Reproduction ==
The male protects the eggs that are laid on land. After hatching, the male carries the tadpoles on his back to water where they develop further.

== Threats ==
The IUCN classifies this frog as critically endangered. Much of its habitat has been fragmented or changed to farmland and areas for rearing livestock. Scientists believe climate change and ultraviolet light could hurt the frogs, eggs, and tadpoles.
