= Green and red venter harlequin toad =

Conservation status
- Critically endangered, possibly extinct (IUCN 3.1)

Scientific classification
- Kingdom: Animalia
- Phylum: Chordata
- Class: Amphibia
- Order: Anura
- Family: Bufonidae
- Genus: Atelopus
- Species: A. pinangoi

Binomial name
- Atelopus pinangoi Rivero, 1982

Species of amphibian

The green and red venter harlequin toad (Atelopus pinangoi) is a species of toad in the family Bufonidae, endemic to Venezuela. Its natural habitats are subtropical or tropical moist montane forests, rivers, and intermittent rivers. It is threatened by habitat loss.

== Sources ==
- La Marca, E.; García-Pérez, J.E. (2004). "Atelopus pinangoi". IUCN Red List of Threatened Species. 2004 e.T54542A11164544. doi:10.2305/IUCN.UK.2004.RLTS.T54542A11164544.en.
