= Dinira National Park =

National park

Dinira National Park Parque Nacional Dinira
- IUCN category II (national park)
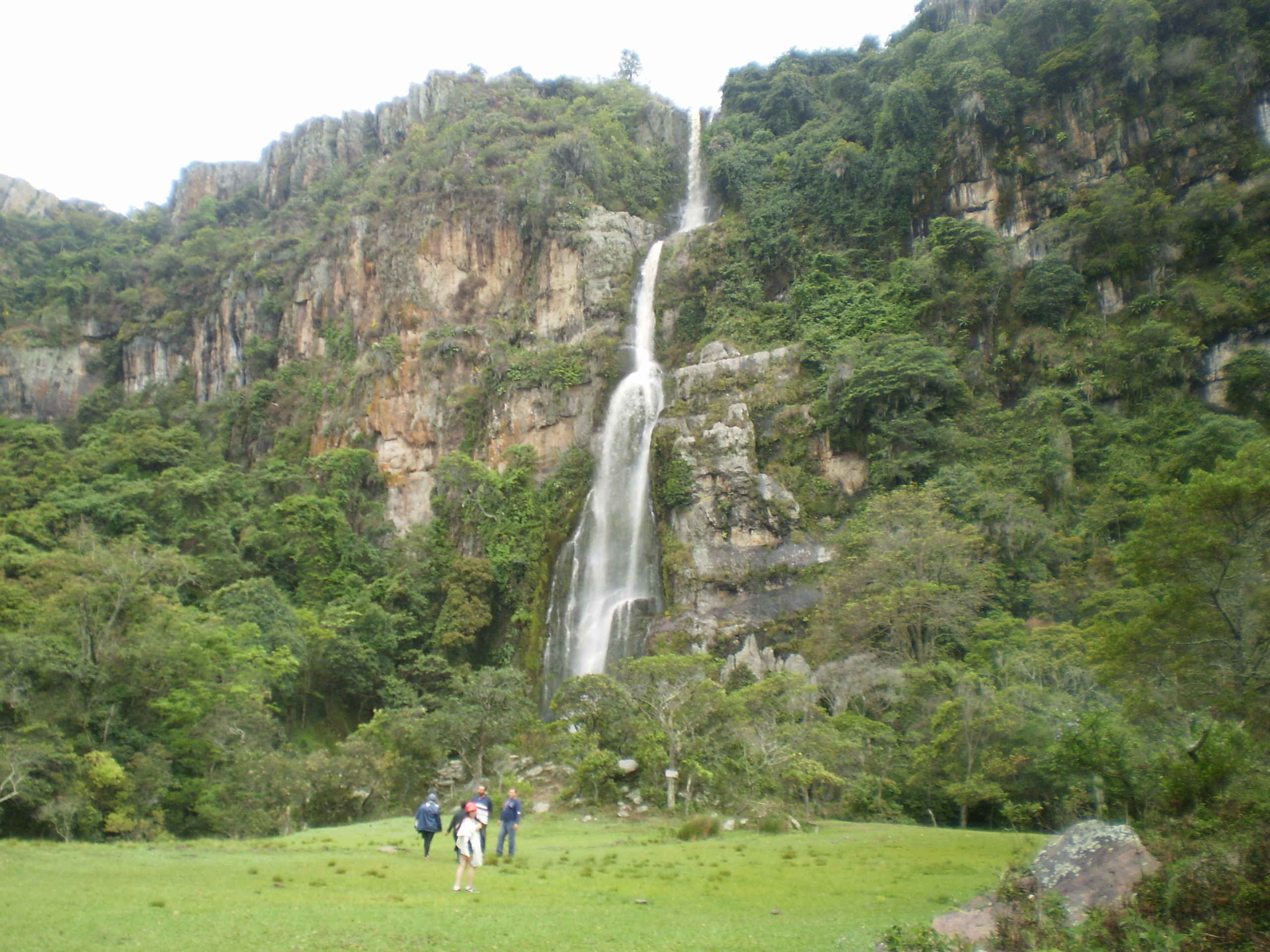

- Location within Venezuela
- Location: Venezuela
- Coordinates: 9°25′N 70°10′W
- Area: 453.28 km^{2} (175.01 sq mi)
- Established: November 30, 1988

The Dinira National Park (Spanish: Parque nacional Dinira) is a protected area with the national park status located in the Cordillera de Mérida between the states Lara, Portuguesa and Trujillo in the South American country of Venezuela. It was created on November 30, 1988.

It was created in order to protect the upper basin of the Tocuyo River. In total there are five basins, Orinoco, Guanare, Motatán, and Lake Maracaibo, including the Tocuyo River.

It has an area of 45,328 hectares of mountainous relief which are home to the headwaters of the Tocuyo River and numerous streams of regional importance. This motivated the natives who populated it to call it Dinira, because its waters feed other currents below. It can rain up to 1,300 mm annually.

== Gallery ==
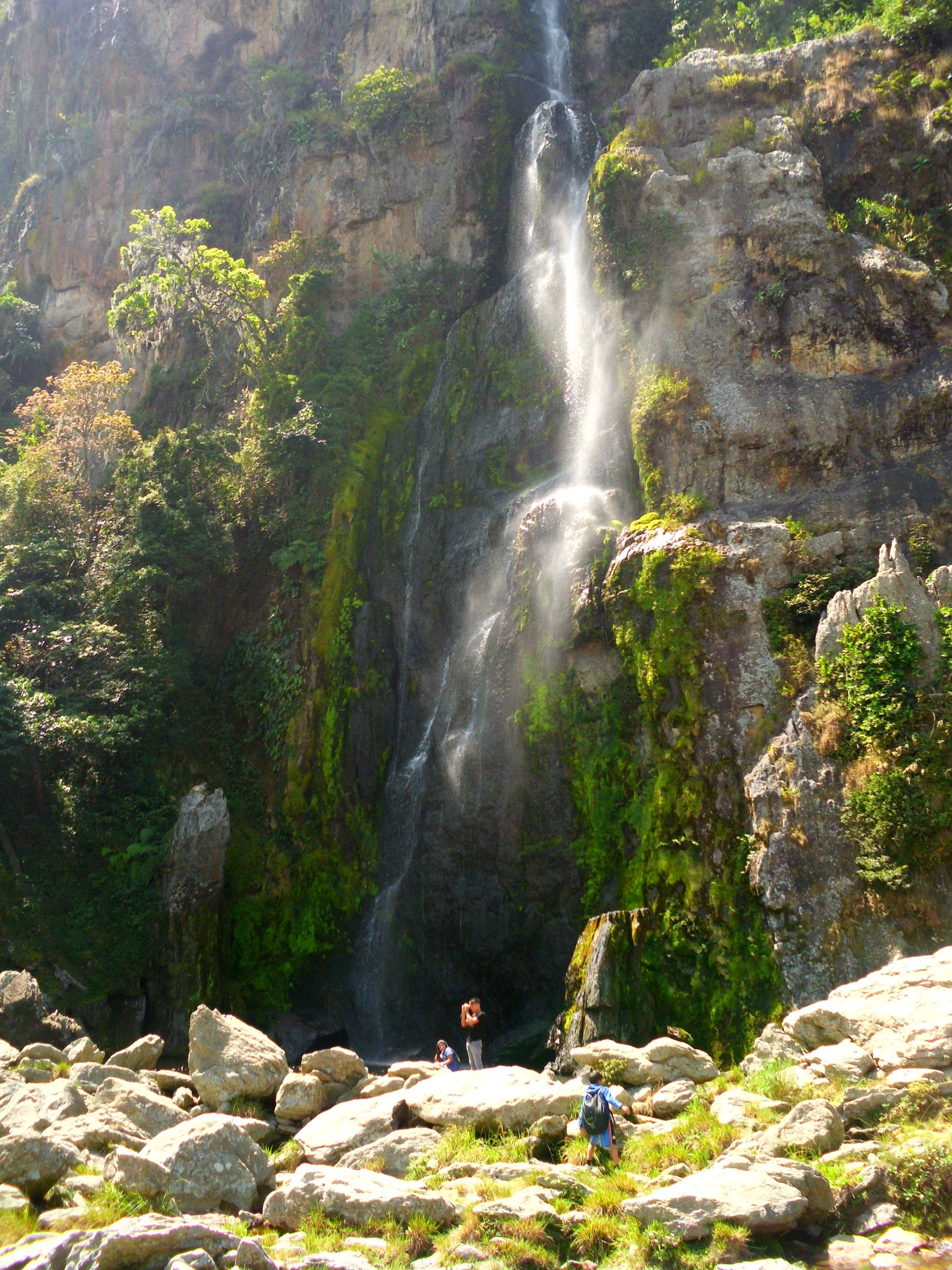
Cascada del Vino

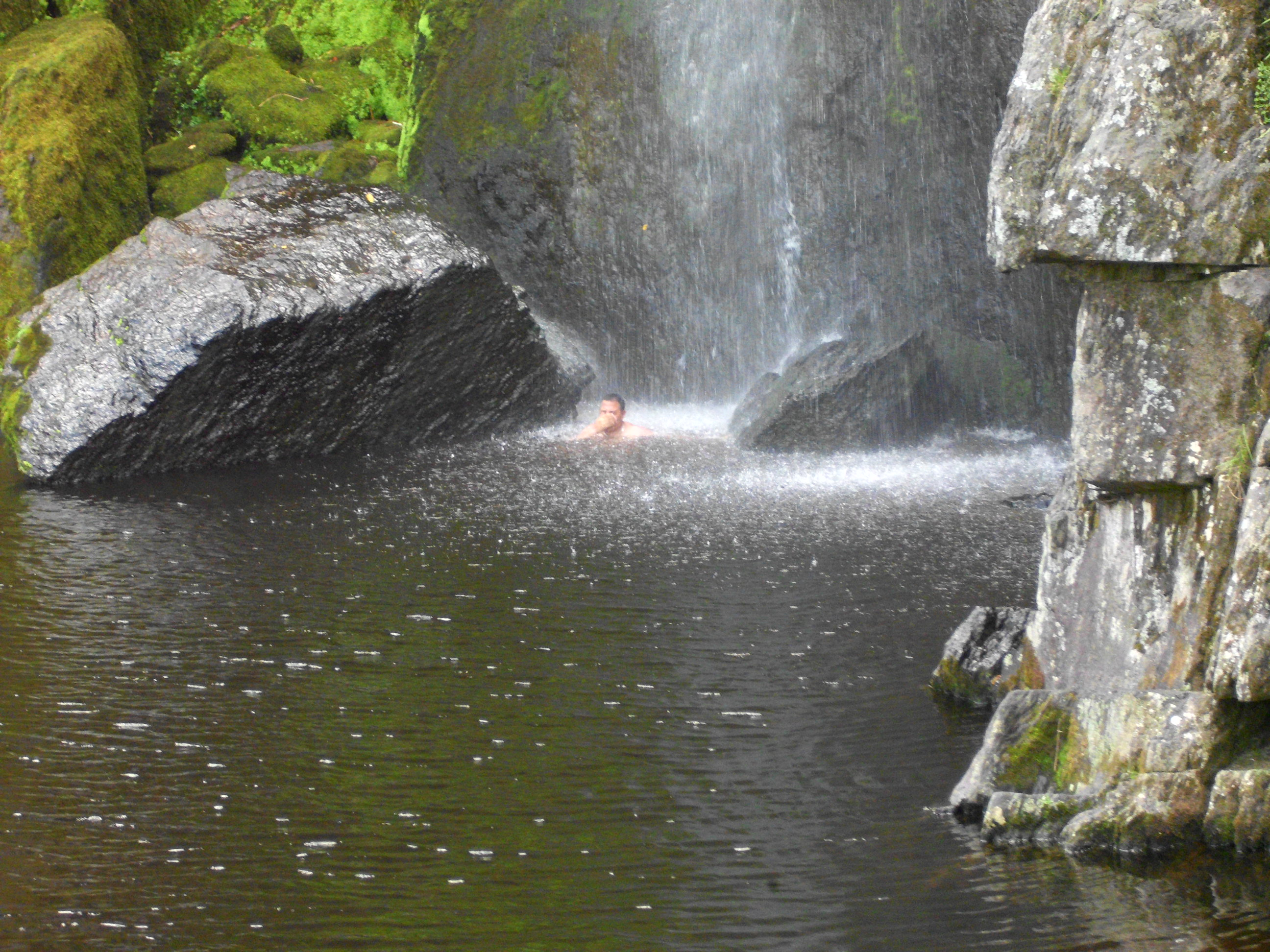
Lagoon

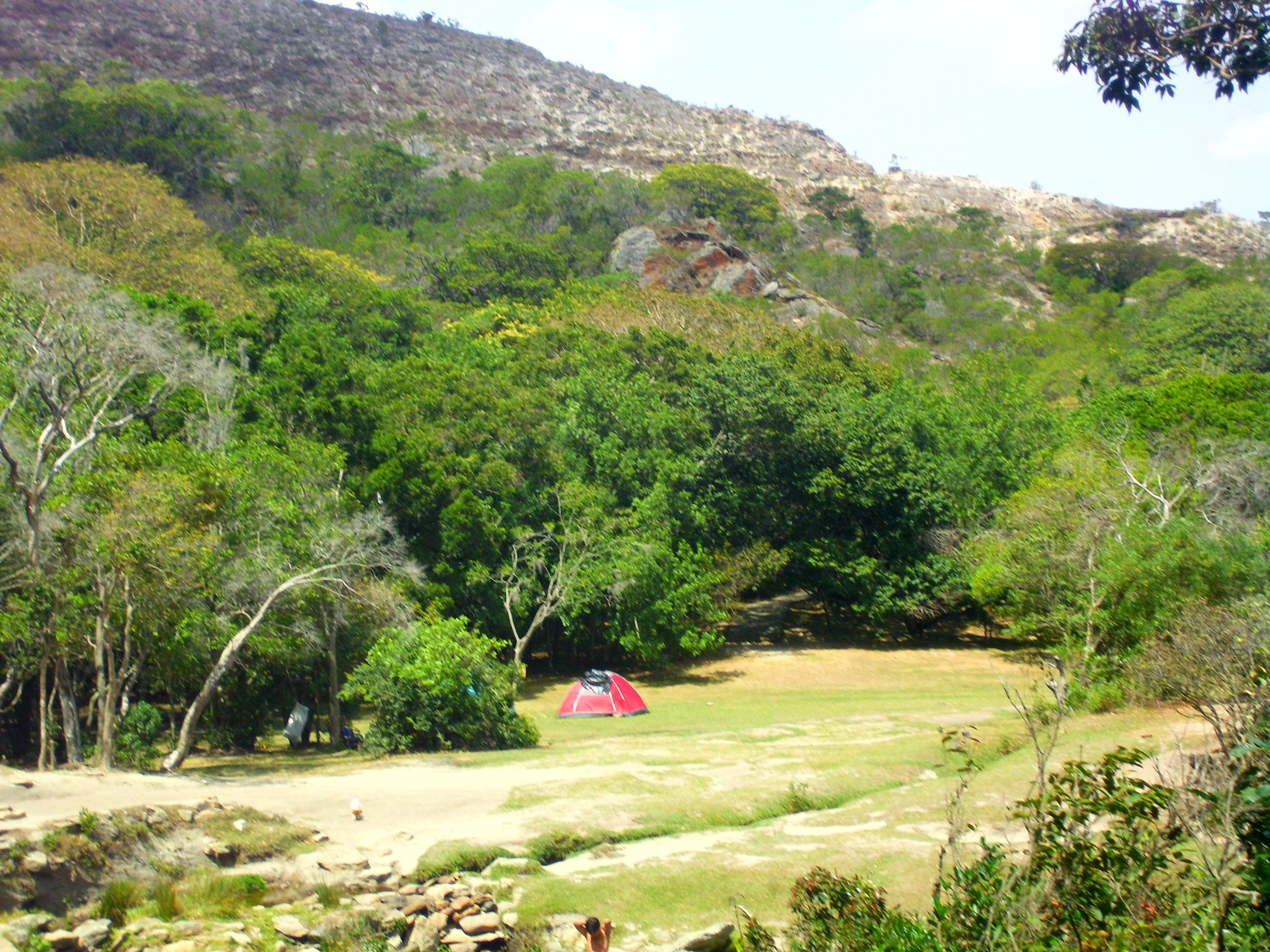
Camping

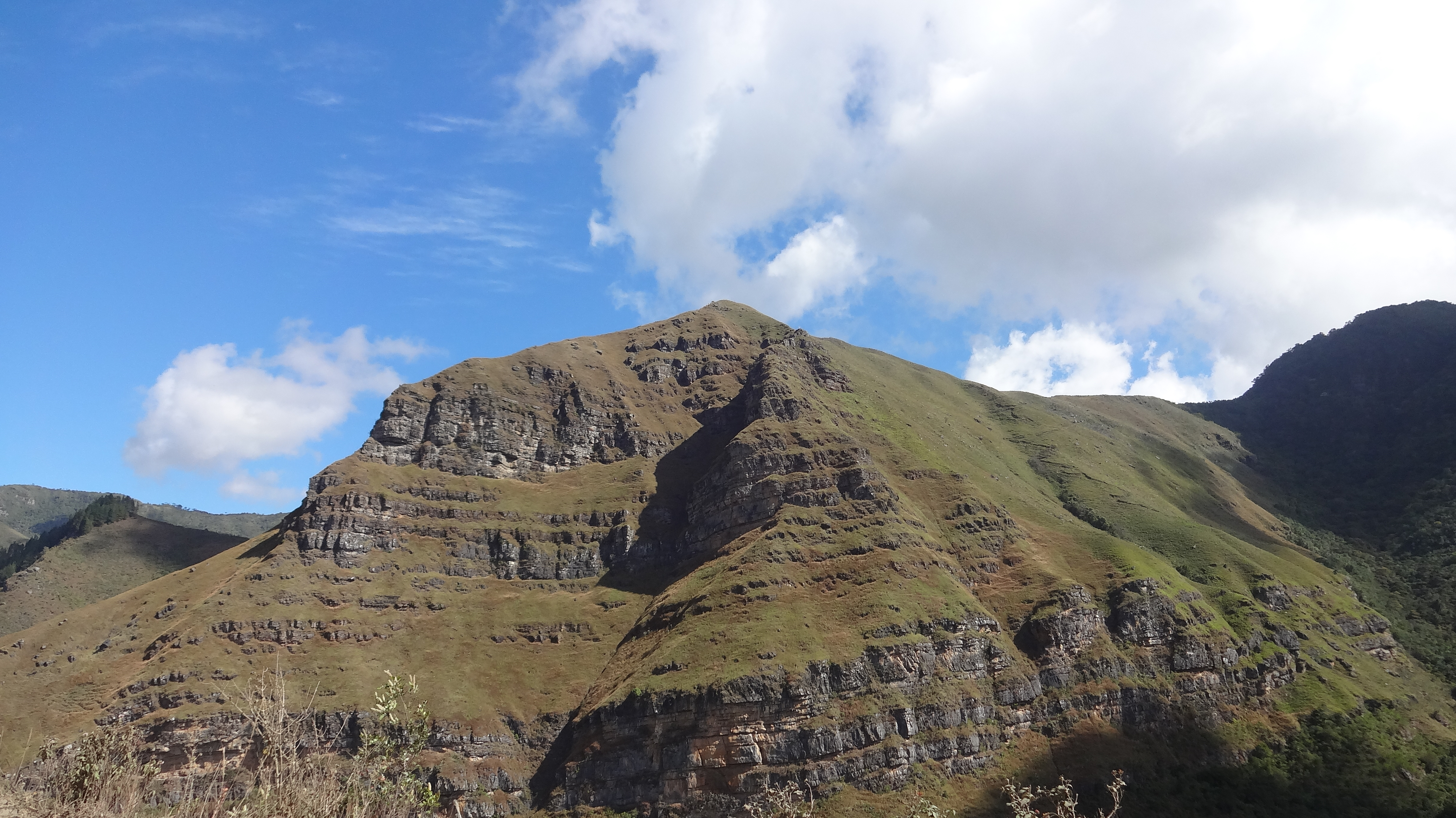
Humocaro Mountains

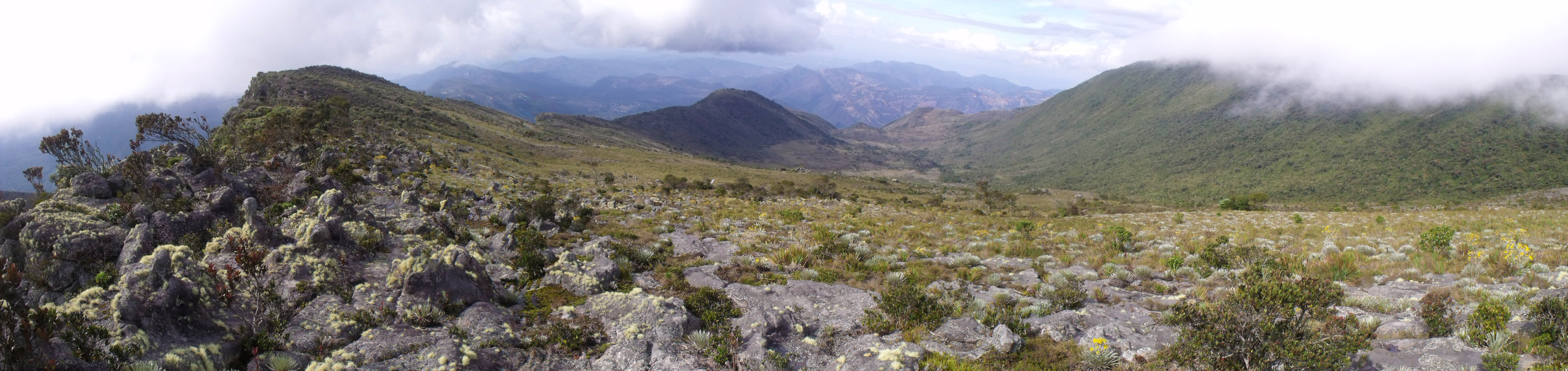
Los Nepes

== See also ==
- List of national parks of Venezuela
- Morrocoy National Park
