= Cordillera de Mérida =

Series of mountain ranges in Venezuela

Coordinates: 8°40′N 71°00′W

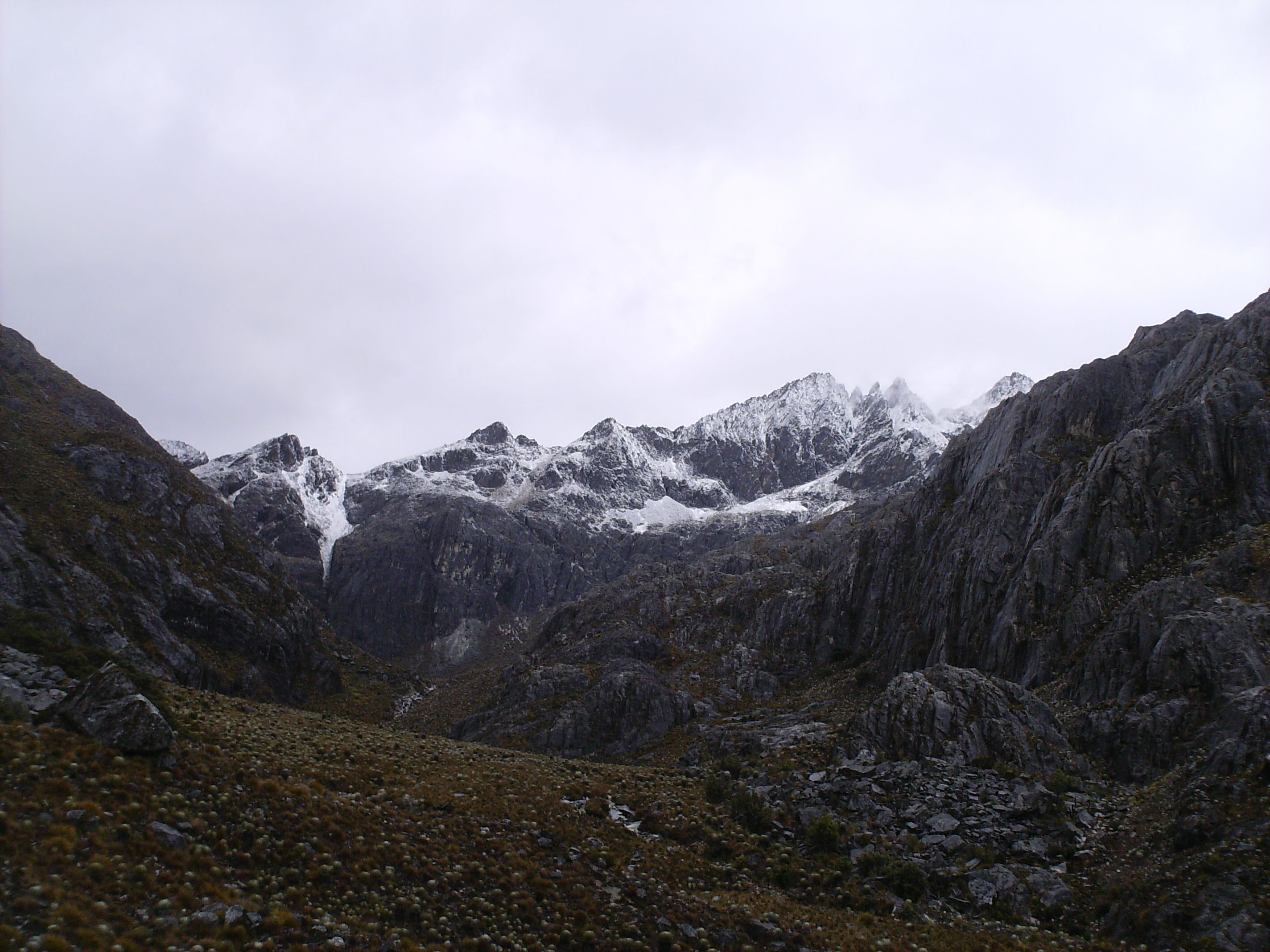
Some of the cordillera at Sierra Nevada de Mérida.

The Cordillera de Mérida is a mountain range, or massif, in northwestern Venezuela. The Cordillera de Mérida is a northeastern extension of the Andes Mountains and the most important branch of the Venezuelan Andes. The range runs approximately 400 kilometers, from the Venezuela-Colombia border in the southwest to the Venezuelan Coastal Complex in the northeast. The Táchira depression separates the Cordillera de Mérida from the Cordillera Oriental, which forms the Colombia-Venezuela border.

== Description ==
The range spans about 40,000 square kilometers, covering most of Táchira, Mérida, and Trujillo states, and parts of Lara, Barinas, Portuguesa, Apure and Zulia states. The southeastern slopes are drained by tributaries of the Orinoco River, while the streams that drain the northwestern slopes empty into Lake Maracaibo. At the southwestern end of the range lies the city of San Cristóbal, while at the northeast tip lies the city of Barquisimeto and the headwaters of the River Cojedes. In the centre of the range is the city of Mérida, its namesake. Two subsidiary ranges of peaks lie on either side of the city: the Sierra de la Culata to the north and Sierra Nevada de Mérida to the south. Pico Bolívar, at 4,981 meters elevation (16,342 feet), is the highest peak in Venezuela.

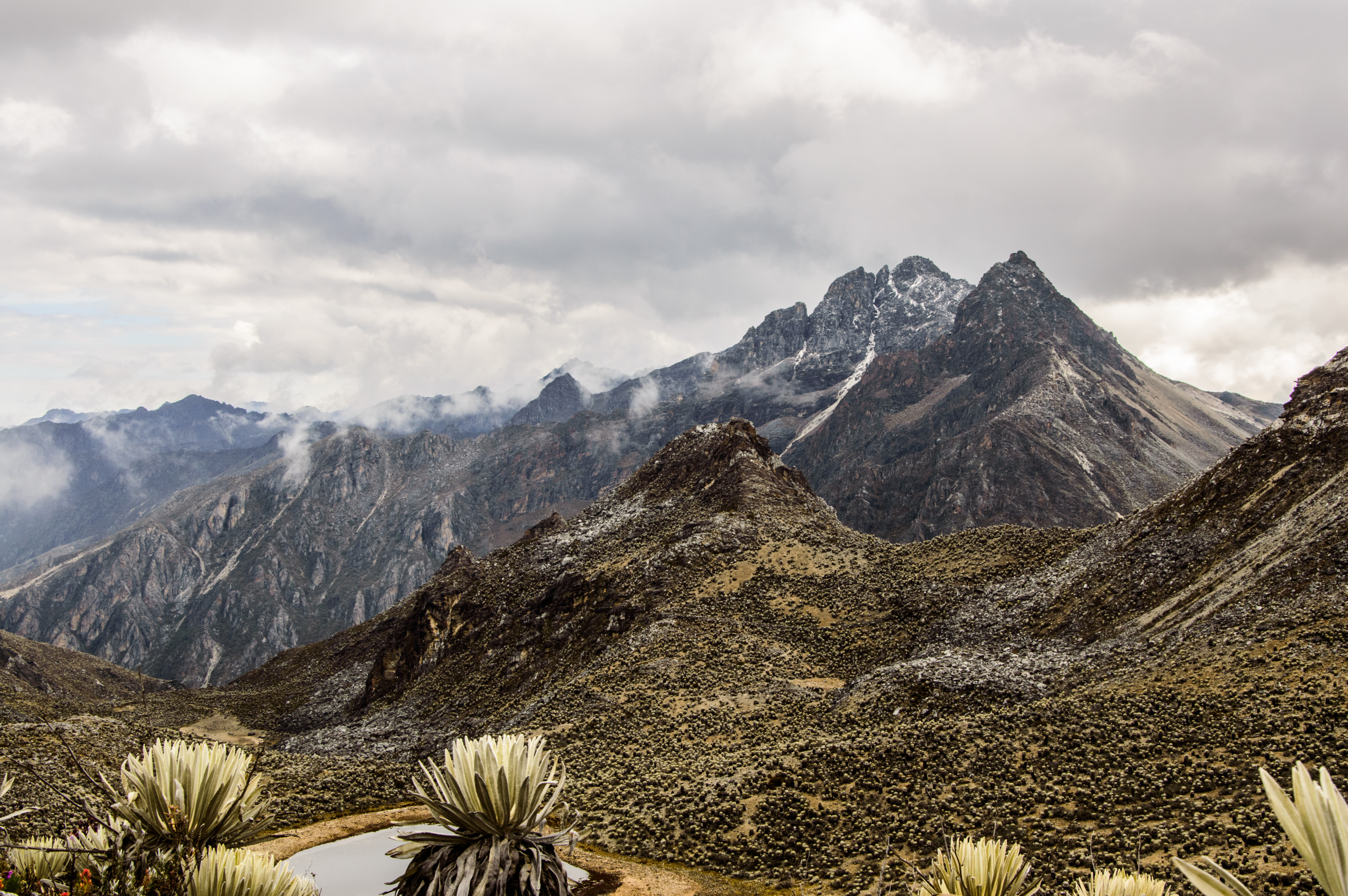
Some of the cordillera at Sierra de La Culata.

Most of the Cordillera de Merida is covered by Venezuelan Andes montane forests, although the highest elevations (above 3,100 meters) are above tree line. This landscape is home to the Cordillera de Mérida páramo, an enclave of the páramo (tropical alpine grasslands) of the northern Andes. Protected areas in the Cordillera and adjacent uplands include Sierra Nevada, Sierra La Culata, El Tama, Juan Pablo Peñaloza, Tapo-Caparo, Ramal de Calderas, Guaramacal, Dinira, Yacambu, El Guache, and Terepaima national parks.

One glacier, the Humboldt glacier, is located in this mountain range, in which the snowy season is July–August. Snow typically covers the mountains above 4,200 meters, and sometimes above 3,800 meters.
