= Sierra La Culata National Park =

National Park in the Venezuelan Andes

Sierra La Culata National Park Parque nacional Sierra de La Culata
- IUCN category II (national park)
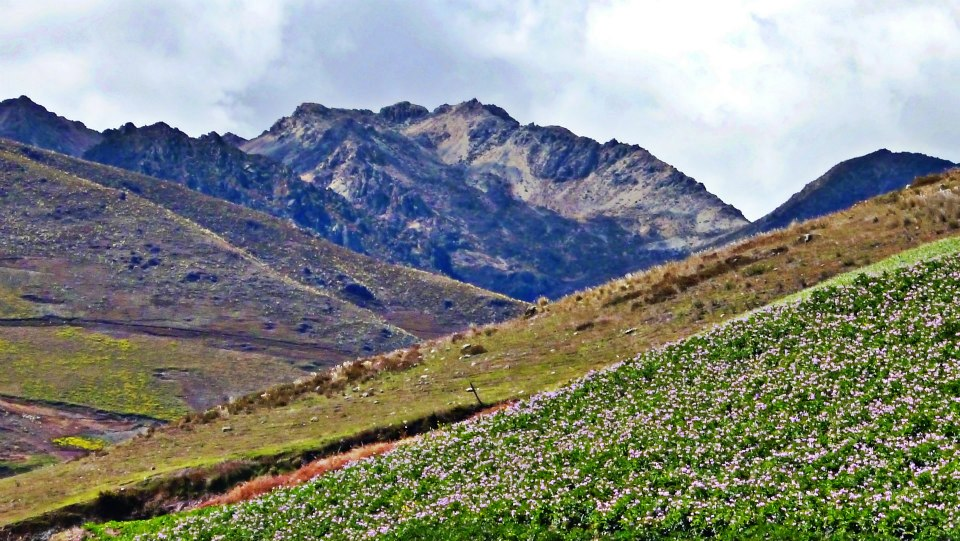

- Location within Venezuela
- Location: Venezuela
- Coordinates: 8°48′N 70°58′W
- Area: 2,004 km^{2} (774 sq mi)
- Established: December 7, 1989; 36 years ago

The Sierra La Culata National Park (Spanish: Parque nacional Sierra de La Culata) Also Sierra de la Culata National Park is a national park of Venezuela that is located in the northeastern branch of the Venezuelan Andes, in the states Mérida and Trujillo. It was decreed a national park on December 7, 1989. It has a high mountain climate, with temperatures ranging between −2 and 24 °C (28 and 75 °F), and its surface area is 200,400 hectares (774 sq mi).

The vegetation is characterized by the presence of numerous species of frailejones, shrubs such as ericaceae and melastomataceae; ferns and numerous mosses, liver lichens and fungi. The tree of the zone is the Coloradito.

This park houses species such as the Jaguar, the Spectacled bear, the Armadillo, the Loach, the Andean condor, and amphibians such as the nurse frog (sapito niñera).

Within the park are at least one endemic species of brachythermal butterfly (Round empetrus).

== Gallery ==
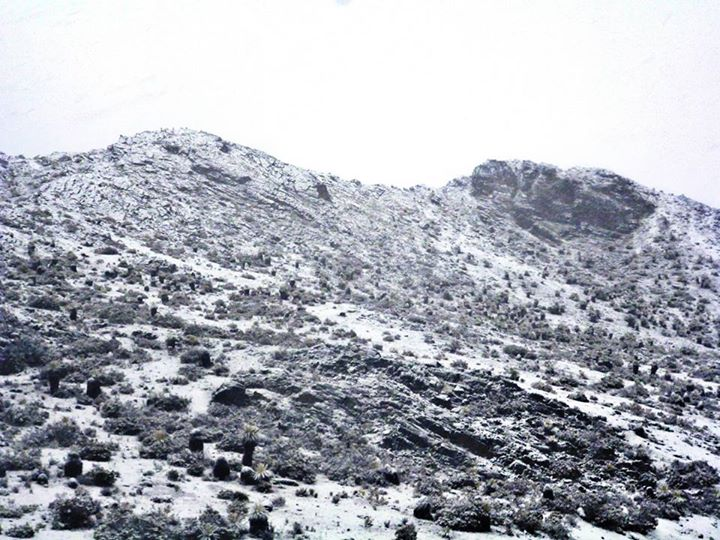
Snow

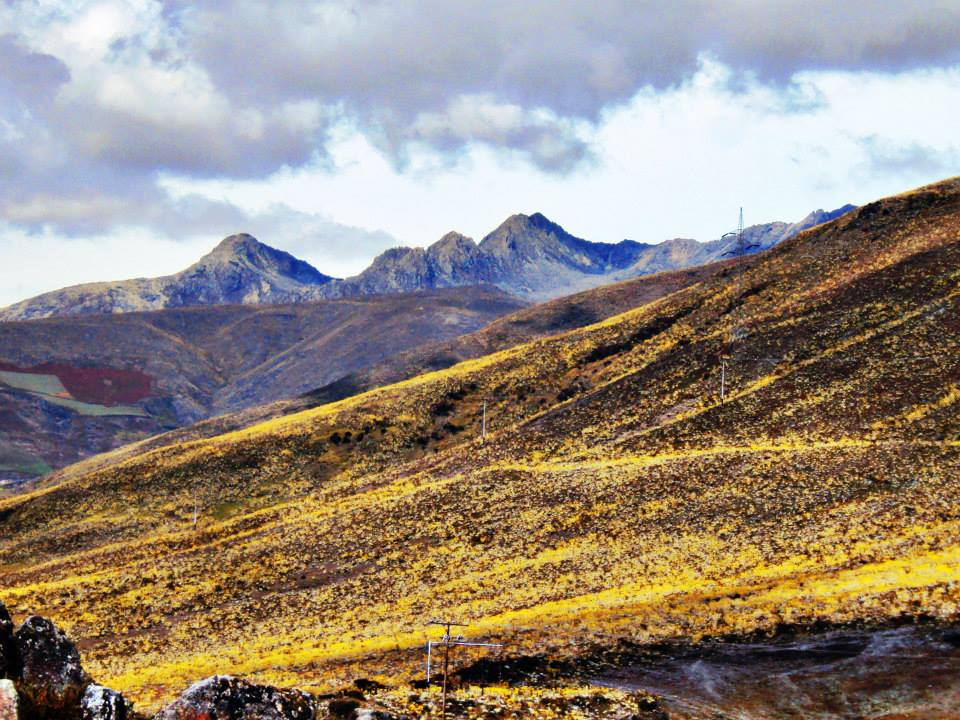
Mucubají paramo

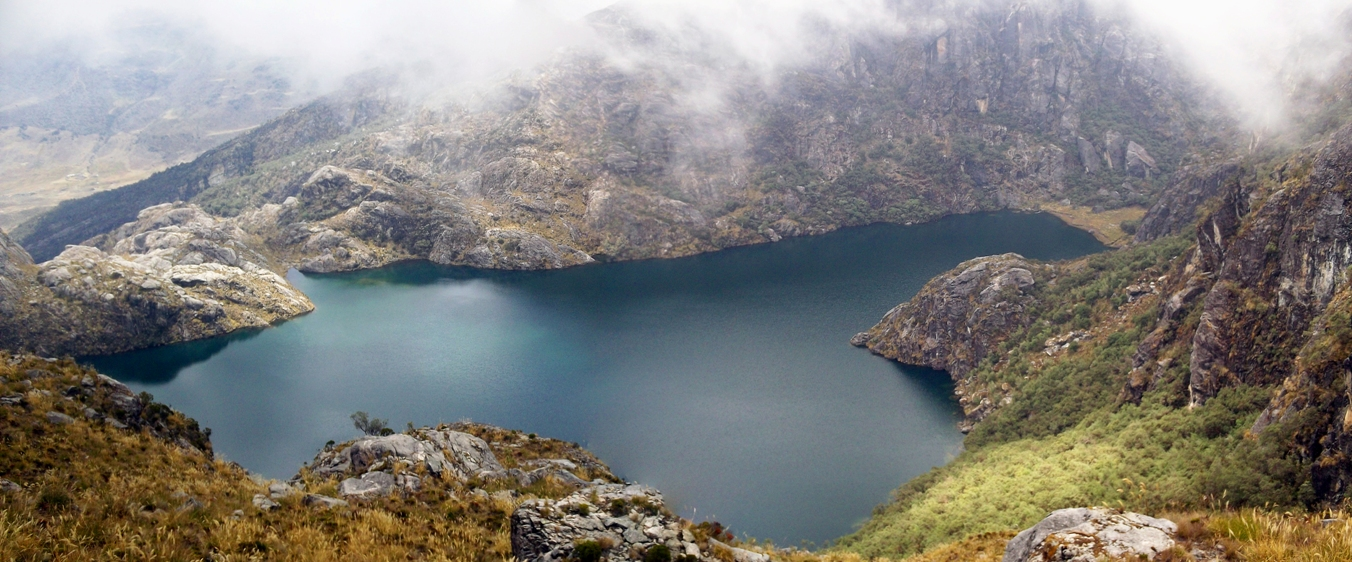
Las Iglesias Lagoon

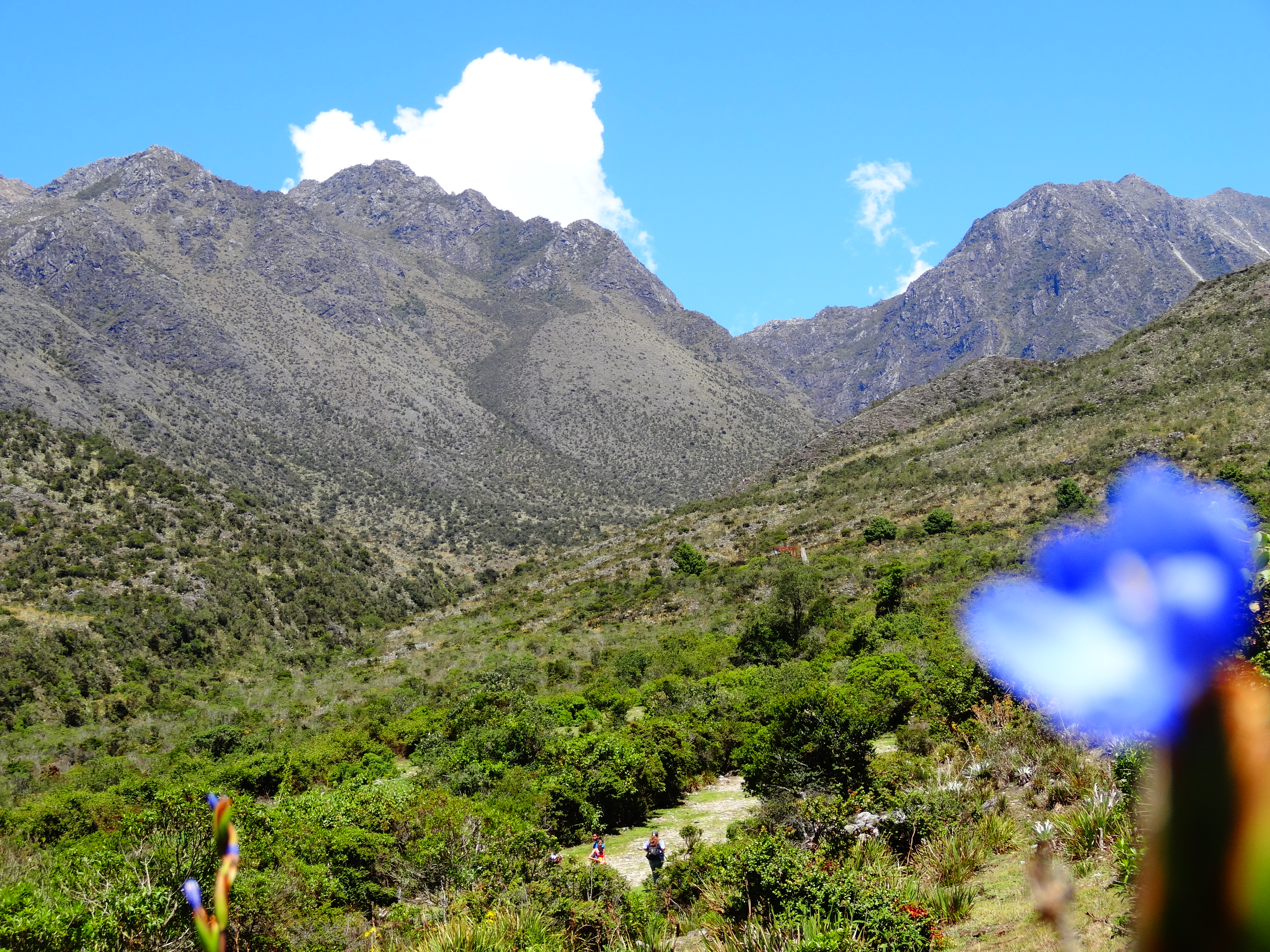
View of the Sierra

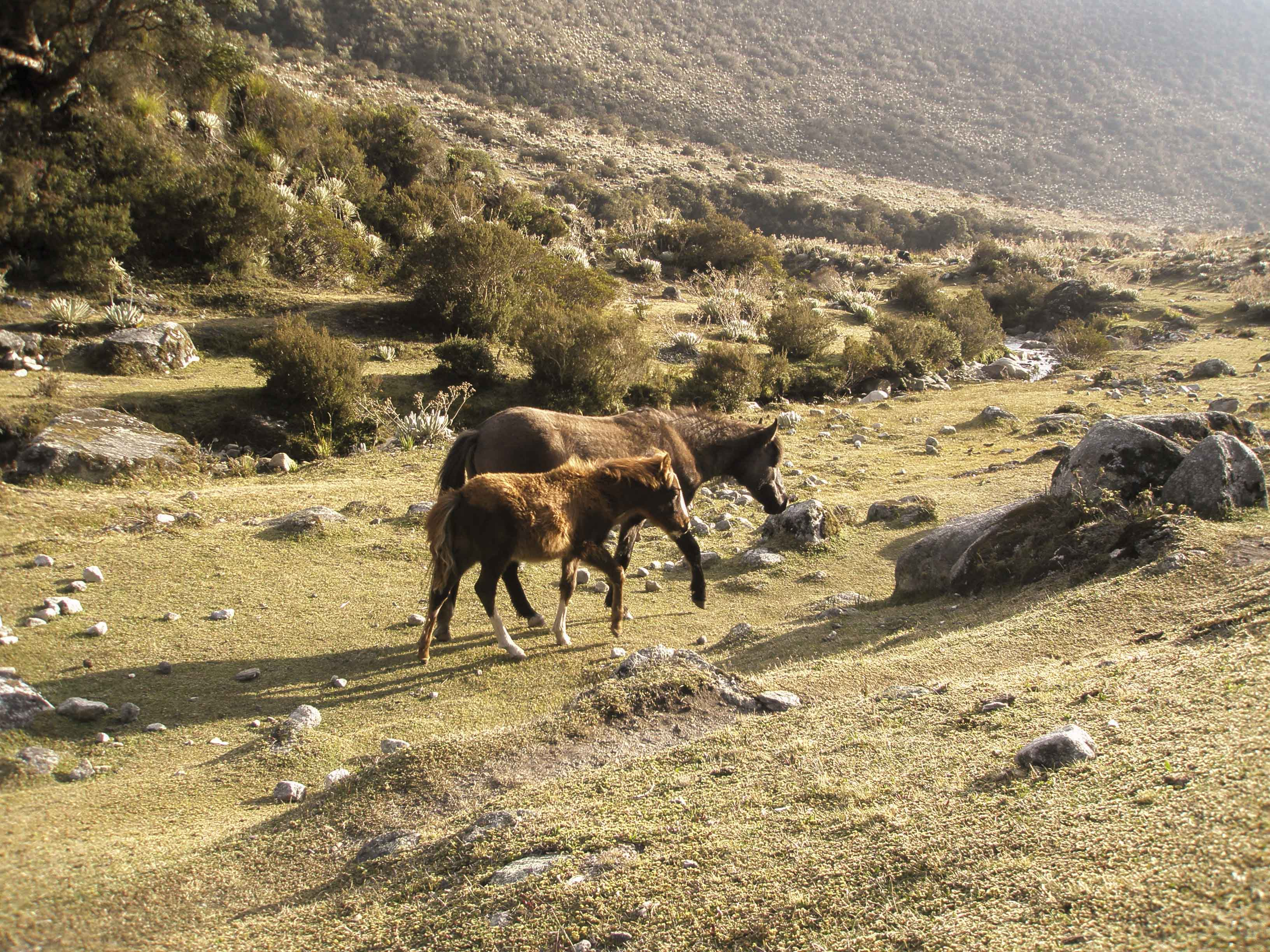
Horses in the park

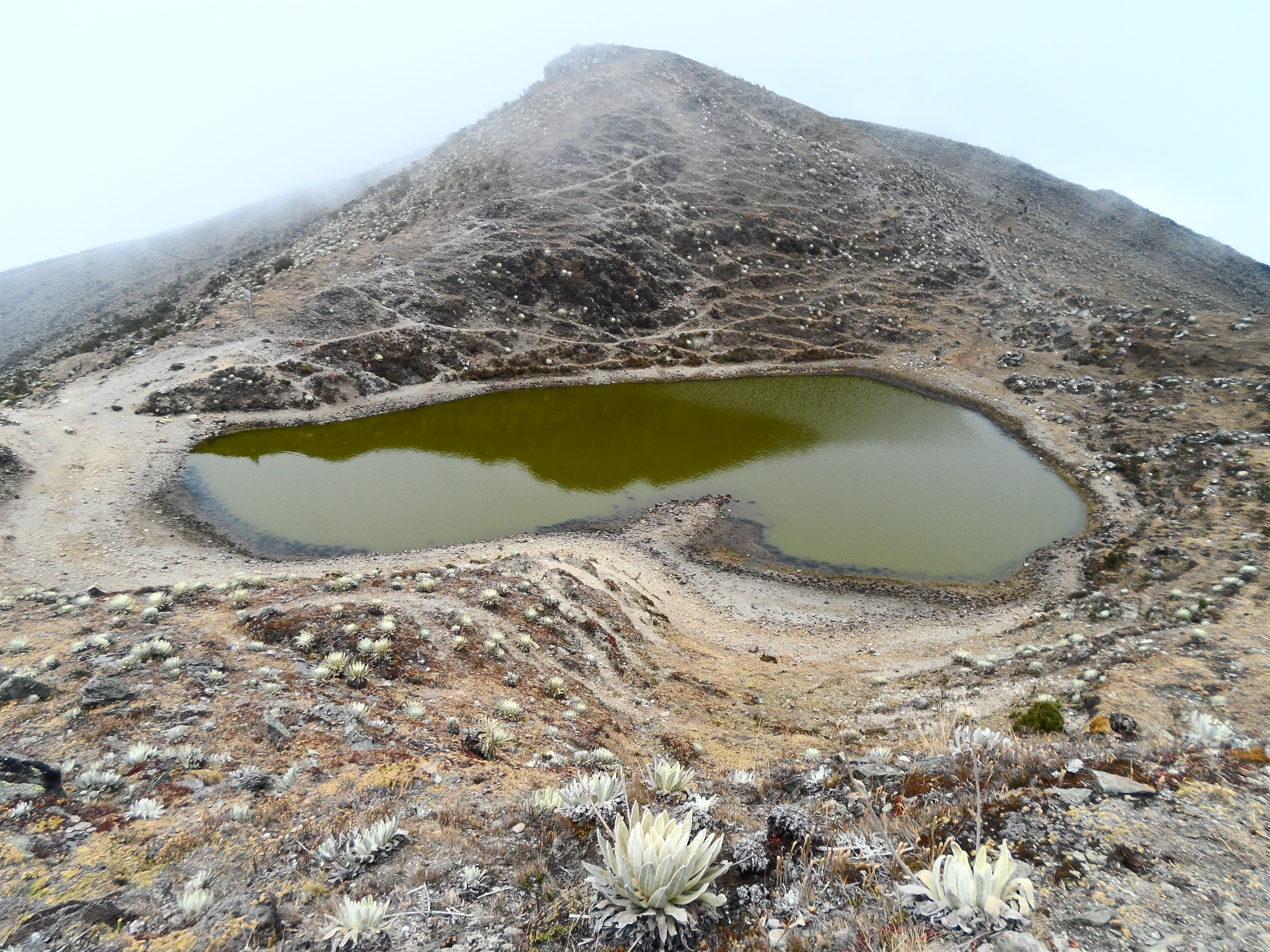
La Calzona Lagoon

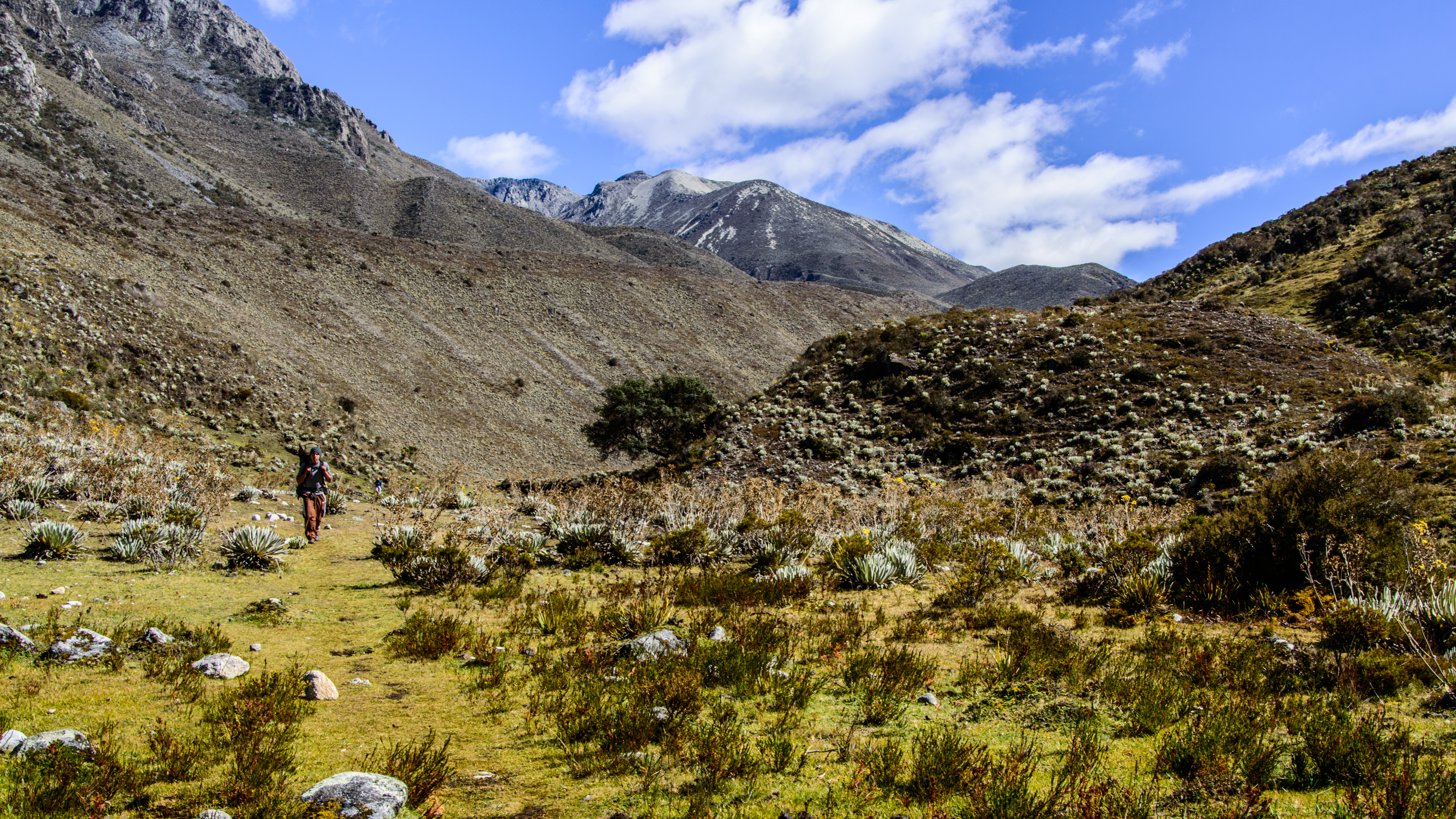
El Muerto Valley

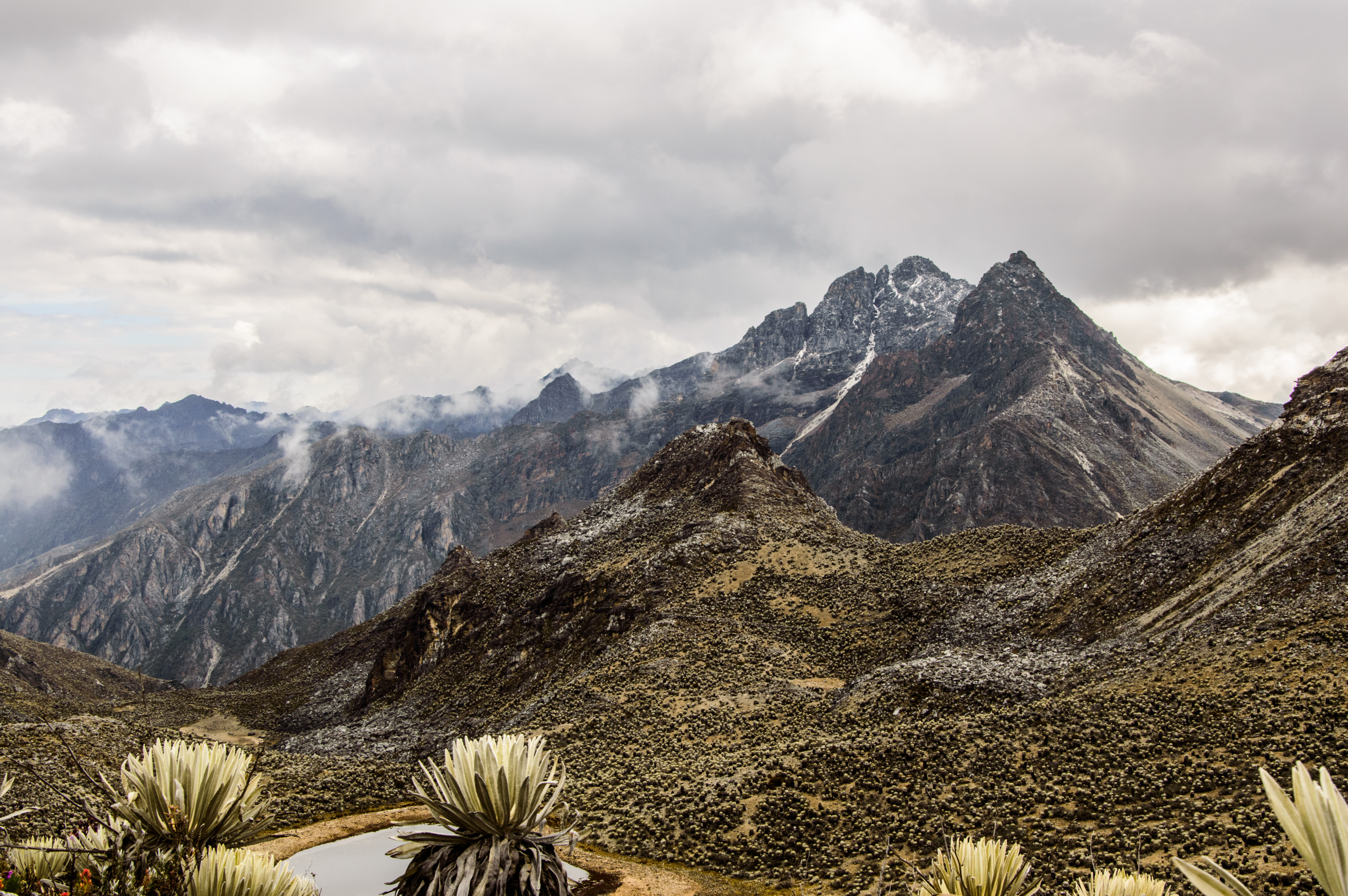
Mifafí Valley

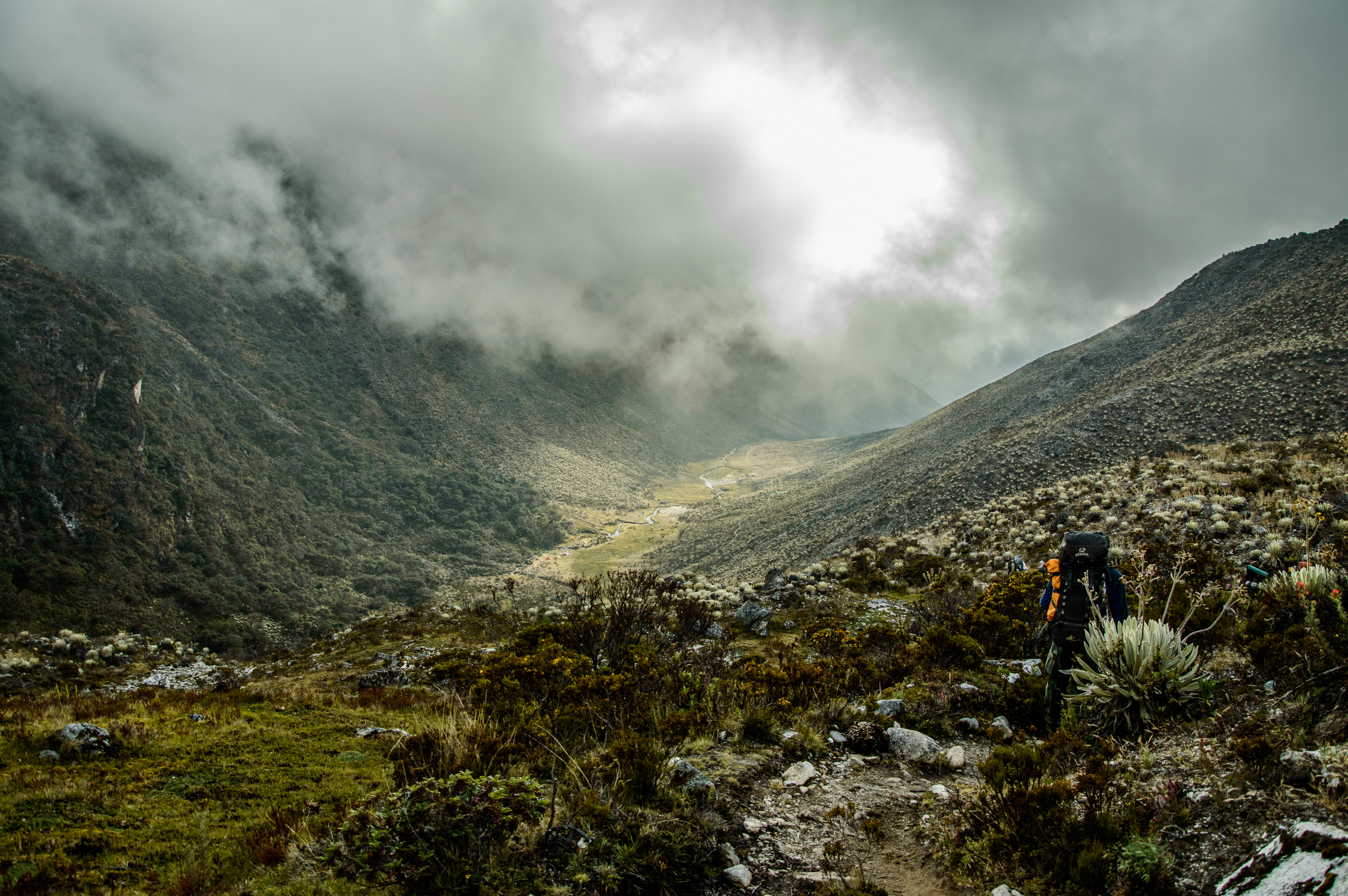
Las Cascadas Valley

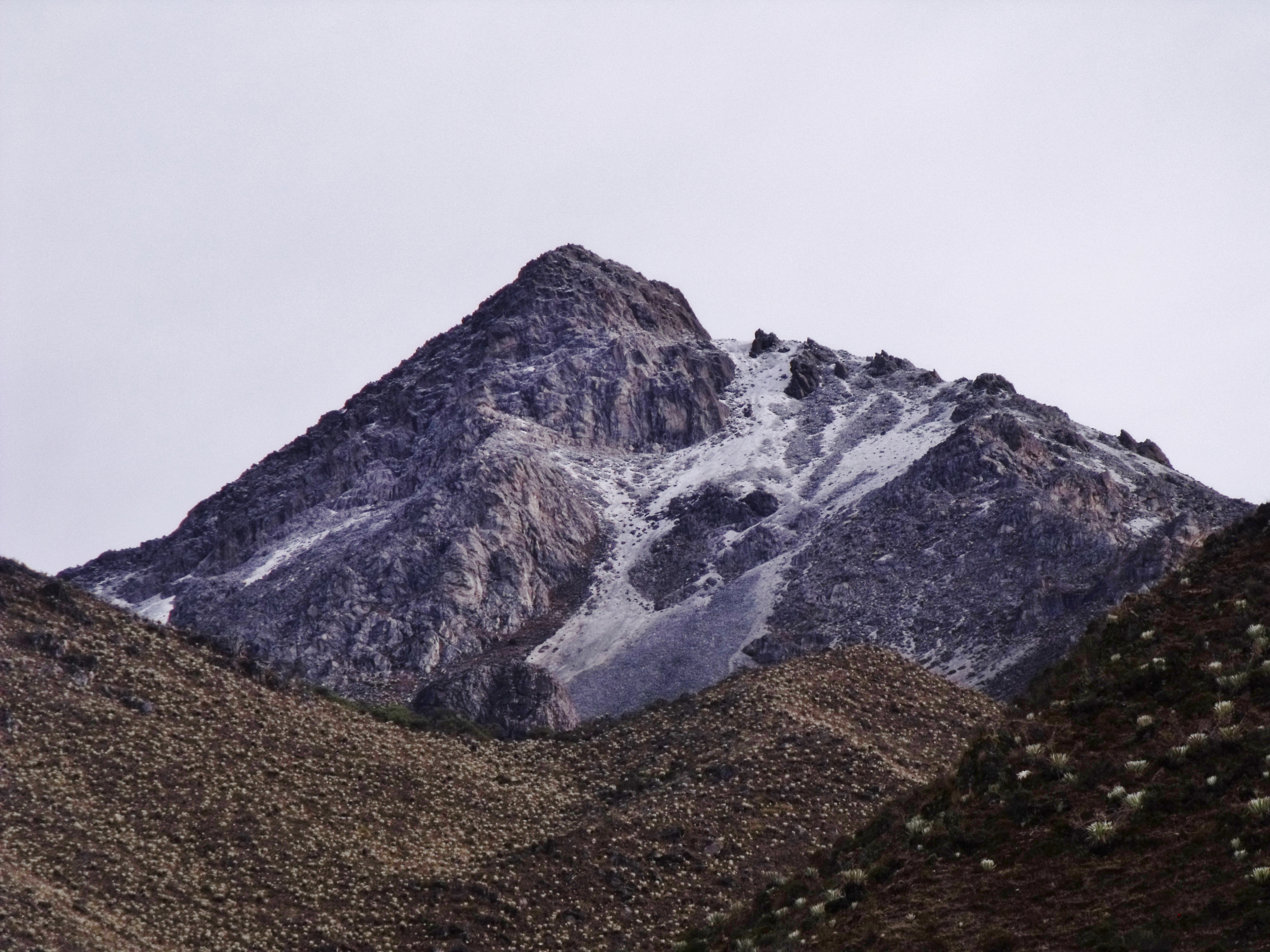
Mountains in the Park

== See also ==
- List of national parks of Venezuela
- Morrocoy National Park
