= Cordillera de la Costa montane forests =

Ecoregion in Venezuela

Cordillera de la Costa montane forests (NT0117)
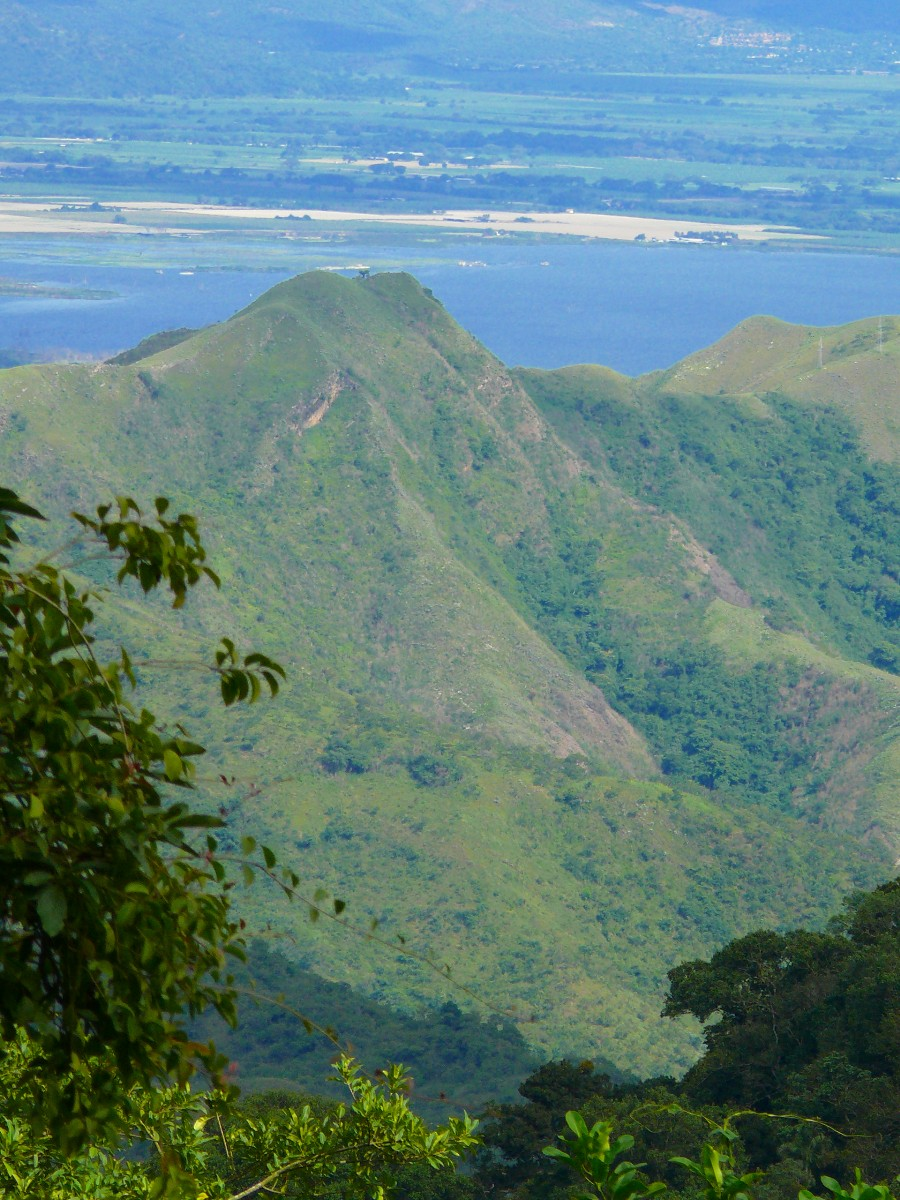
- View from Henri Pittier National Park

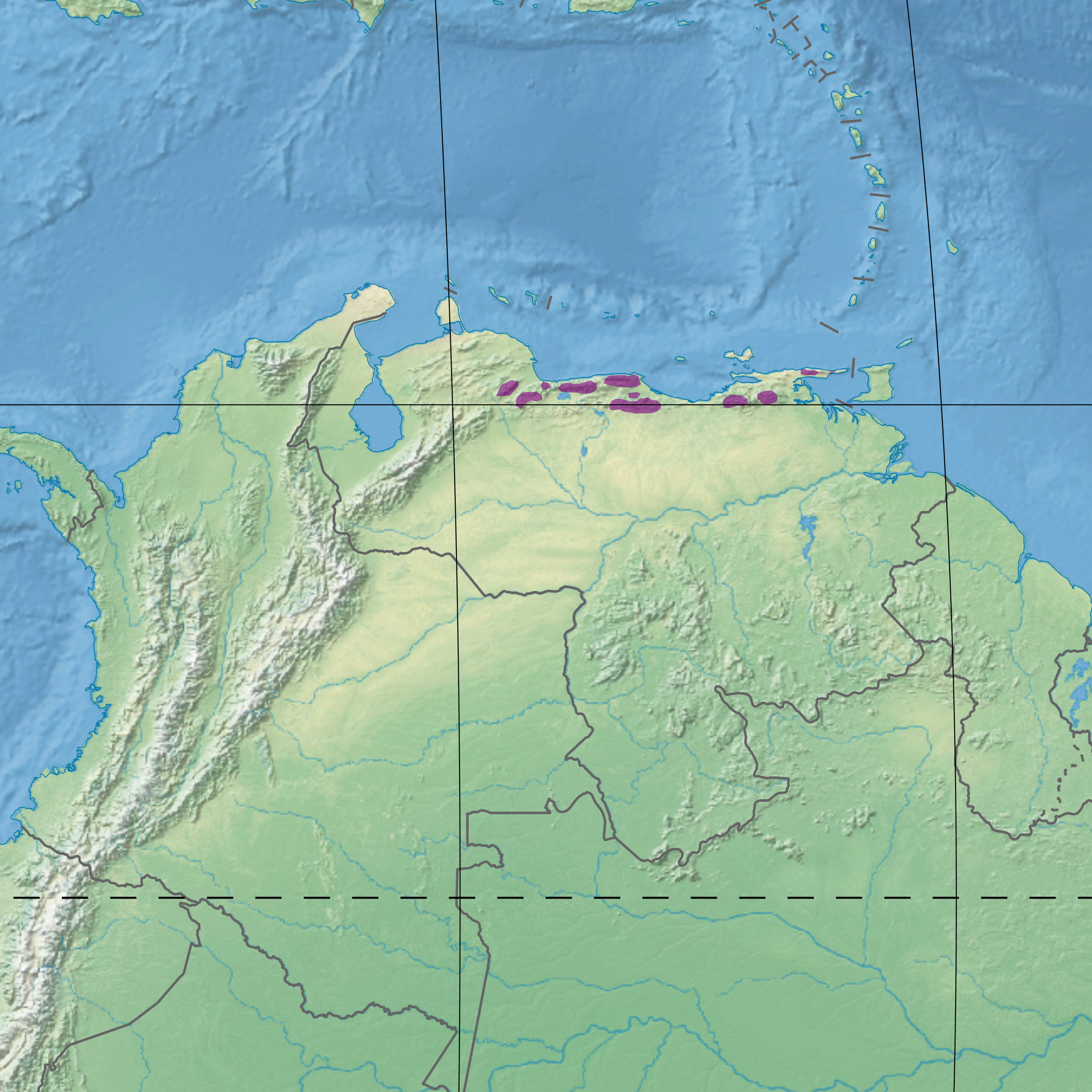
- Ecoregion territory (in purple)

Ecology
- Realm: Neotropical
- Biome: tropical and subtropical moist broadleaf forests
- Borders: Araya and Paria xeric scrub; La Costa xeric shrublands; Lara–Falcón dry forests

Geography
- Area: 14,245 km^{2} (5,500 sq mi)
- Country: Venezuela
- Coordinates: 10.571°N 66.638°W
- Climate type: Aw equatorial, winter dry

The Cordillera de la Costa montane forests is a montane ecoregion of the tropical and subtropical moist broadleaf forests biome, in the Venezuelan Coastal Range (Cordillera de la Costa) on the Caribbean Sea in northern Venezuela.

== Location ==
The Cordillera de la Costa montane forests extend across a series of isolated coastal mountains with an area of 1,424,493 hectares (3,520,000 acres). Most parts of the ecoregion are surrounded by La Costa xeric shrublands. To the west, the ecoregion adjoins the Lara–Falcón dry forests. The two most eastern segments are surrounded by Araya and Paria xeric scrub.

== Physical ==
The Cordillera de la Costa montane forests ecoregion consists of eleven enclaves between 600–2,675 metres (1,969–8,776 ft) in elevation. The Venezuelan Coastal Range, which is actually two parallel ranges, runs east and west across northern Venezuela, separating the Orinoco River basin to the south from the Caribbean Sea to the north. The range consists of western and eastern sections. The Coastal Range is a northeastern extension of the Andes Mountains, separated from the Cordillera de Mérida to the southwest by the Yaracuy Depression. These forest enclaves are surrounded at lower elevations by the dry La Costa xeric shrublands, and are separated from both the moist forests of the Andes and of Amazonia by dry shrublands and the vast Llanos grasslands of the Orinoco basin.

== Climate ==
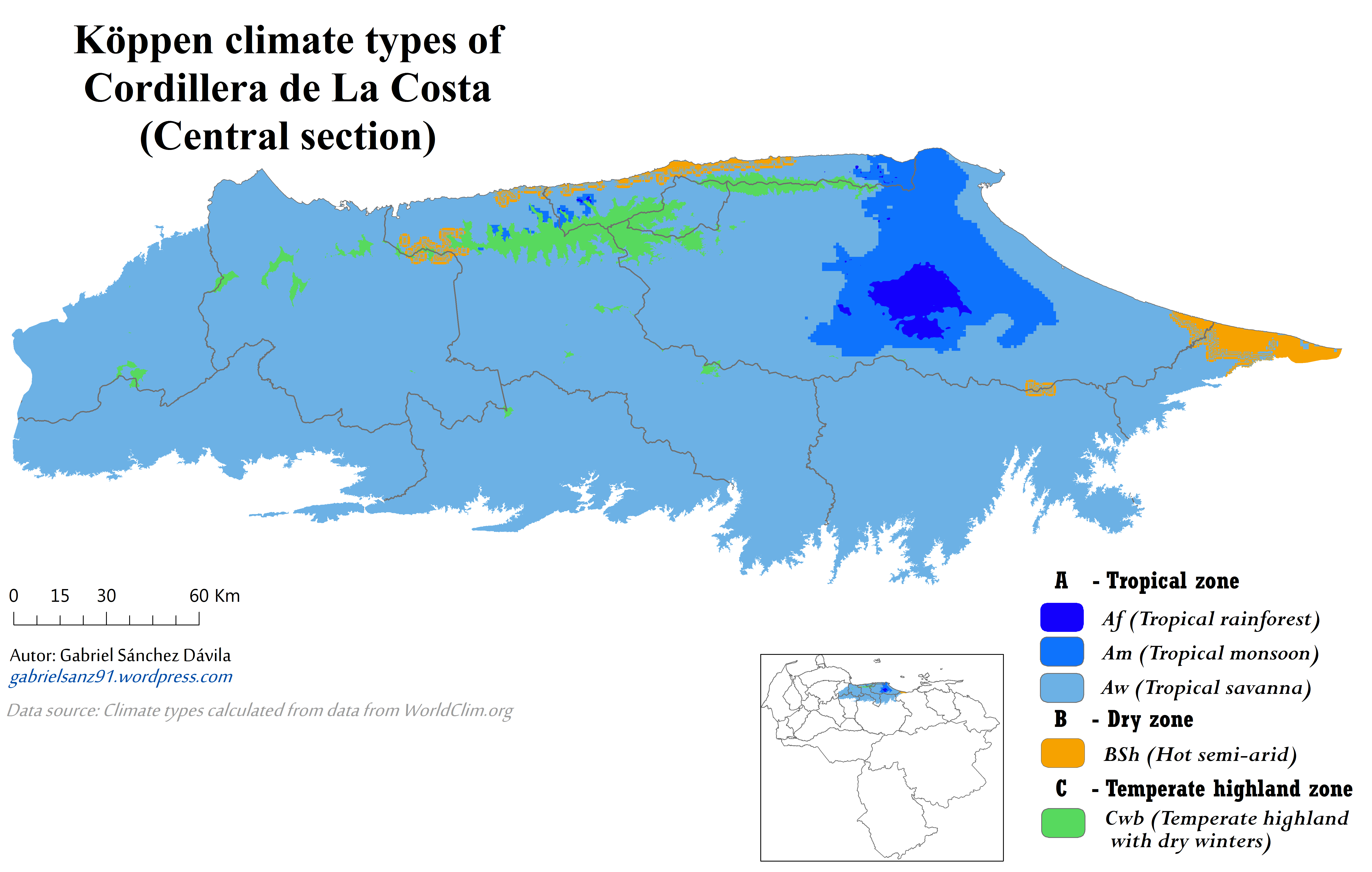
Koppen climate type in the area

The Köppen climate classification is "Aw": equatorial, winter dry in most of the region. While at higher elevation of mountain range, the Köppen climate classification is "Cwb": warm temperate, winter dry.

== Flora ==
The ecoregion is home to three main plant communities, evergreen transition forests, evergreen montane cloud forests, and upper montane elfin forest, which are determined by elevation and exposure.

=== Evergreen transition forests ===
The Evergreen transition forests extend from 600 to 900 metres to 1000 metres elevation. They lie above the drier lower montane semi-deciduous forests of the La Costa xeric shrublands. The transition forests have a closed canopy made up of Trophis racemosa, Ficus macbridei, Tetragastris caracasana, Zanthoxylum ocumarense, Banara nitida, etc. The giant endemic tree Gyranthera caribensis, which can grow up to 60 m in height, forms small emergent stands that rise above the forest canopy. The understory is composed of woody shrubs, ferns, and large herbs like Heliconia bihai, Heliconia revoluta, and Dieffenbachia maculata.

=== Evergreen montane cloud forests ===
The Evergreen montane cloud forests range from 1000 to 2000–2400 m elevation, and the most species-rich plant community in the ecoregion. The forests have a closed canopy of 15–20 m elevation. Palms are common in both the canopy and the understory, growing as solitary trees or in large clumps, depending on the species. The forests support a dense understory of shrubs, herbs, and ferns, and the trees are festooned with abundant epiphytes (ferns, orchids, bromeliads, ericads and gesneriads).

=== Upper montane elfin forest and scrub ===
The Upper montane elfin forest and scrub is found above 2000–2400 m. It consists of low mossy forests of dwarfed trees, including Clusia multiflora, Weinmannia spp., and Prumnopitys harmsiana, as well as open scrublands dominated by Libanothamnus neriifolius.

== Fauna ==
Endangered amphibians include Allobates mandelorum, Atelopus cruciger, Flectonotus fitzgeraldi, Gastrotheca ovifera, Hyalinobatrachium pallidum, Mannophryne neblina, Mannophryne riveroi and Pristimantis turumiquirensis. Endangered birds include Venezuelan flowerpiercer (Diglossa venezuelensis), scissor-tailed hummingbird (Hylonympha macrocerca), Paria whitestart (Myioborus pariae), grey-headed warbler (Basileuterus griseiceps), helmeted curassow (Pauxi pauxi), Urich's tyrannulet (Phyllomyias urichi), red siskin (Spinus cucullatus) and black-and-chestnut eagle (Spizaetus isidori).

== Conservation and threats ==
The World Wildlife Fund gives the ecoregion the status of "Vulnerable". Protected areas include the Macarao National Park and the Henri Pittier National Park.

== Sources ==
- Bonaccorso, Elisa A., Northern South America: Northern Venezuela (NT0117), WWF: World Wildlife Fund
- "Cordillera La Costa montane forests", Global Species, Myers Enterprises II
- WildFinder, WWF: World Wildlife Fund
