= Mannophryne venezuelensis =

Conservation status
- Near Threatened (IUCN 3.1)

Scientific classification
- Kingdom: Animalia
- Phylum: Chordata
- Class: Amphibia
- Order: Anura
- Family: Aromobatidae
- Genus: Mannophryne
- Species: M. venezuelensis

Binomial name
- Mannophryne venezuelensis Manzanilla, Jowers, La Marca, and García-París, 2007

Species of frog

Mannophryne venezuelensis, the Paria collared frog, is a frog in the family Aromobatidae. It is endemic to the Serranía de Ziruma in Falcón and Zulia in Venezuela.

== Description ==
The adult male frog measures 19.4 mm long in snout-vent length and the adult female frog 21.5 mm. It has a diffuse pattern on its dorsum, light brown color on the bottoms of all four feet, and diffuse stripes in the inguinal area.

== Habitat ==
This frog is awake during the day, though scholars differ on whether it is riparian or terrestrial. It usually lives near streams on mountains in cloud forests and other types of forest, but during the rainy season when the humidity is high, it can travel far from bodies of water, sometimes moving from one to another. Scientists observed the frog between 0 and 1000 meters above sea level.

The frog's known range has some overlap with Península de Paria National Park.

== Reproduction ==
The male frogs perch on rocks next to streams and call to the female frogs during the day. Scientists believe the frog reproduces in the same manner as its congeners: The female frog lays eggs on land, and, after the eggs hatch, the male frogs carry the tadpoles to water. Scientists saw male frogs carrying 7–10 tadpoles on their backs.

== Threats ==
Both the IUCN and the Venezuelan Fauna Red List classify this species as near threatened. The main threats are habitat loss from intentional fires and small-scale agriculture, both cocoa and subsistence, and logging. Scientists believe that the fungal disease chytridiomycosis could also pose some threat, but they have surveyed the area for the causative pathogen.
