= Mannophryne larandina =

Conservation status
- Data Deficient (IUCN 3.1)

Scientific classification
- Kingdom: Animalia
- Phylum: Chordata
- Class: Amphibia
- Order: Anura
- Family: Aromobatidae
- Genus: Mannophryne
- Species: M. larandina

Binomial name
- Mannophryne larandina (Rivero, 1984)

Synonyms
- Colostethus larandinus Yústiz, 1991; Mannophryne larandina Mijares-Urrutia and Arends-R., 1999

Species of frog

Mannophryne larandina, or the Lara Andean collared frog, is a species of frog in the family Aromobatidae. It is endemic to the Venezuelan Andes and has been found in Lara.

== Taxonomy ==
Scientists suspect this frog may be synonymous with Mannophryne yustizi, but no reports confirming this have yet been published.

== Habitat ==
This frog lives in forests on mountains. Scientists observed it 1800 meters above sea level.

While there are no reports of this animal in any protected park, it was found near Parque Nacional Dinira.

== Reproduction ==
Scientists infer that this has similar reproductive patterns to other frogs in Mannophryne: The female frog lays eggs on land. The male frog guards the eggs. After the eggs hatch, the male frogs carry the tadpoles to water.

== Threats ==
The IUCN classifies this frog as data deficient. Its probably threats include habitat loss in favor of agriculture.
