= Mannophryne herminae =

Conservation status
- Near Threatened (IUCN 3.1)

Scientific classification
- Kingdom: Animalia
- Phylum: Chordata
- Class: Amphibia
- Order: Anura
- Family: Aromobatidae
- Genus: Mannophryne
- Species: M. herminae

Binomial name
- Mannophryne herminae (Boettger, 1893)

Synonyms
- Prostherapis herminae Boettger, 1893; Colostethus herminae Edwards, 1971; Colostethus trinitatus herminae Rivero, 1984; Mannophryne herminae La Marca, 1994

Species of frog

Mannophryne herminae is a species of frog in the family Aromobatidae. It is endemic to Venezuela.

== Habitat ==
This diurnal frog lives near narrow streams that run through in forests on mountains and in lowlands. It can survive in primary forest, secondary forest, and on coffee and cocoa plantations that have sufficient shade. Scientists have seen the frog between 0 and 1200 meters above sea level.

There are two national parks in the frog's range: San Esteban National Park and Henri Pittier National Park.

== Reproduction ==
The male frogs perch on rocks near streams and call to the female frogs. The female frogs exhibit some territorial behavior. The female frogs lay eggs in the leaf litter near streams. After the eggs hatch, the male frogs carry the tadpoles to ponds in the streams.

== Threats ==
Mannophryne herminae is classified as Near Threatened (NT) on both the IUCN Red List and Venezuelan Fauna Red List. It is threatened by habitat loss associated with human-set fires, unrestricted tourism, and forest conversion to agriculture and urban areas. Venezuela does not always enforce the laws that it has in place to protect these forests.

Scientists have reported the fungus Batrachochytrium dendrobatidis in the area but surveys did produce any infected Mannophyrne herminae. Scientists believe the frog might have some resistance to the fungal disease chytridiomycosis.
