= La Costa xeric shrublands =

Ecoregion in Venezuela

La Costa xeric shrublands (NT1309)
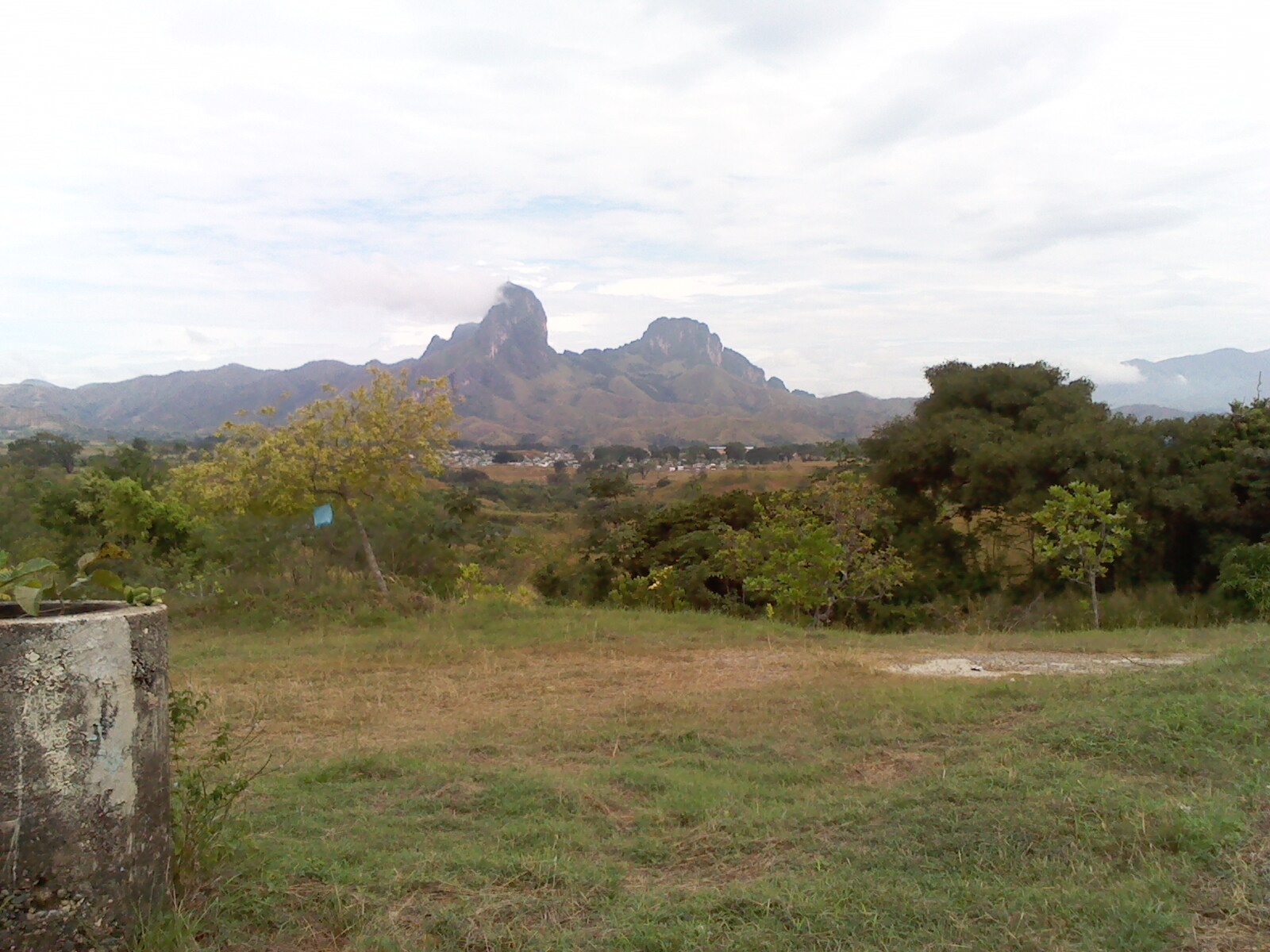
- Morros of San Juan de los Morros

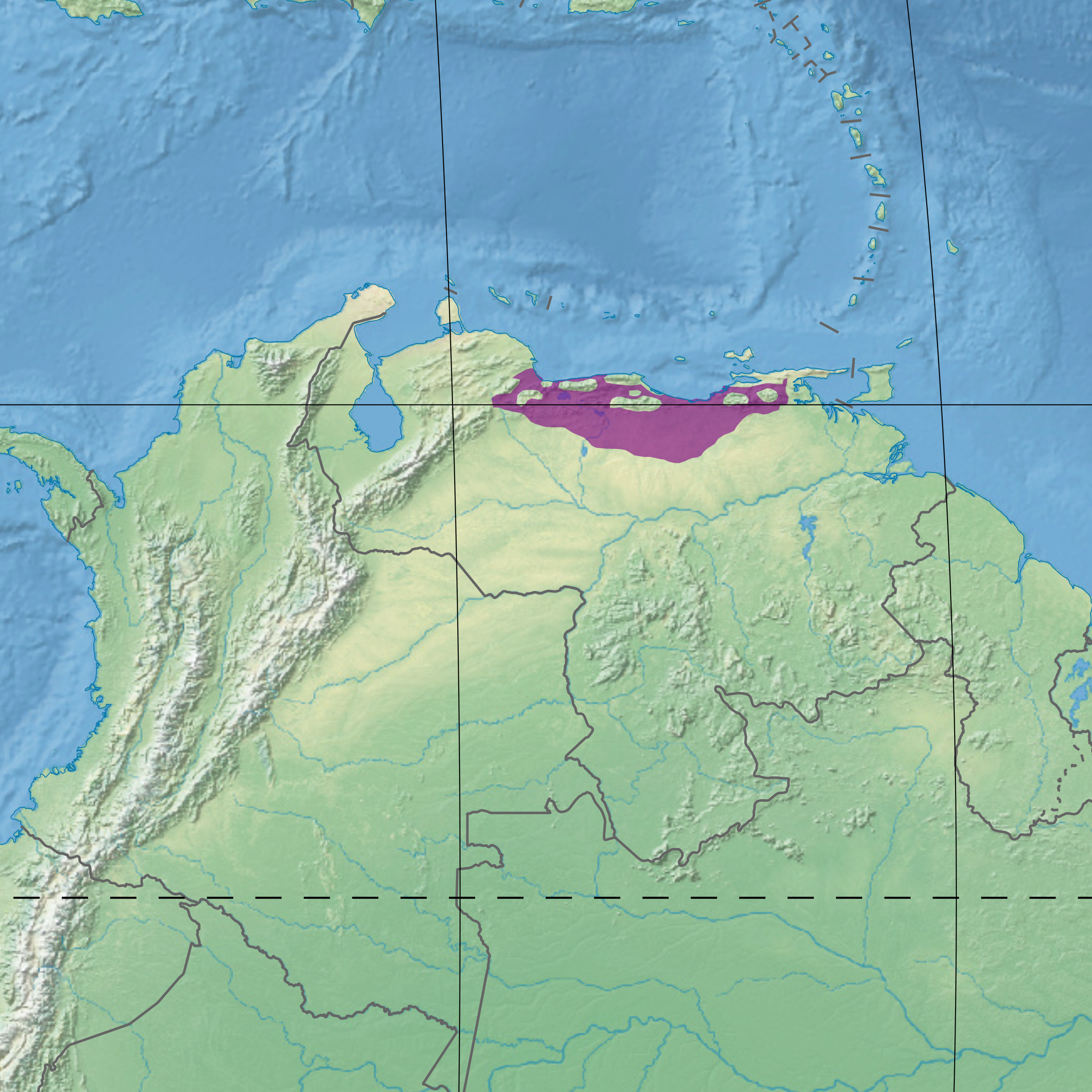
- Ecoregion territory (in purple)

Ecology
- Realm: Neotropical
- Biome: Deserts and xeric shrublands

Geography
- Area: 68,375 km^{2} (26,400 sq mi)
- Country: Venezuela
- Coordinates: 9.386°N 65.944°W
- Climate type: Aw: equatorial, winter dry

The La Costa xeric shrublands (NT1309) is an ecoregion in Venezuela that stretches along the Caribbean coast. The dry scrub and savanna has been subject to modification since the 16th century by European colonists who replaced it by a patchwork of farm fields and pasturage. Little of the original habitat remains.

== Geography ==
=== Location ===
The La Costa xeric shrublands ecoregion extends along Venezuela's Caribbean coast, covering plains, hills and isolated mountains. Caracas, the capital of Venezuela, lies partly in this ecoregion. It reaches from Sucre state in the east to Yaracuy state in the west. The ecoregion includes areas of savanna, dry forest, moist forest, swamp and scrub. It has an area of 6,837,568 hectares (16,896,000 acres).

In the west the shrubland transitions into the Lara-Falcón dry forests ecoregion. The extreme west of the La Costa xeric shrublands merges into the Paraguana xeric scrub just east of Barquisimeto. To the south the La Costa xeric shrublands transitions into the Llanos. There are regions of Cordillera de la Costa montane forests along the Caribbean coastline. The coastal area in the east of the region is covered by Araya and Paria xeric scrub. In the extreme east the ecoregion transitions into Orinoco Delta swamp forests.

=== Terrain ===
The xeric shrublands are in the Coastal Cordillera geographical region. The shrublands, which blend into the Llanos grasslands to the south, surround the mountains of the Venezuelan Coastal Range. Elevations rise from sea level to 1,000 metres (3,300 ft) in the upper foothills of the mountains. Along the coast there are sandy beaches, mangroves, lagoons and hilly patches of moist forest.

=== Climate ===
Average annual temperature is around 20 °C (68 °F). Annual rainfall is 300–1,000 millimetres (12–39 in). At a sample location at coordinates 9.75°N 66.25°W the Köppen climate classification is "Aw": equatorial, winter dry. At this location the mean temperature varies from 24.5 °C (76.1 °F) in July to 26.5 °C (79.7 °F) in April. Total yearly rainfall is about 1,400 millimetres (55 in). Monthly rainfall varies from 12.5 millimetres (0.49 in) in March to 233.1 millimetres (9.18 in) in July.

== Ecology ==
The ecoregion is in the neotropical realm, in the deserts and xeric shrublands biome.

=== Flora ===
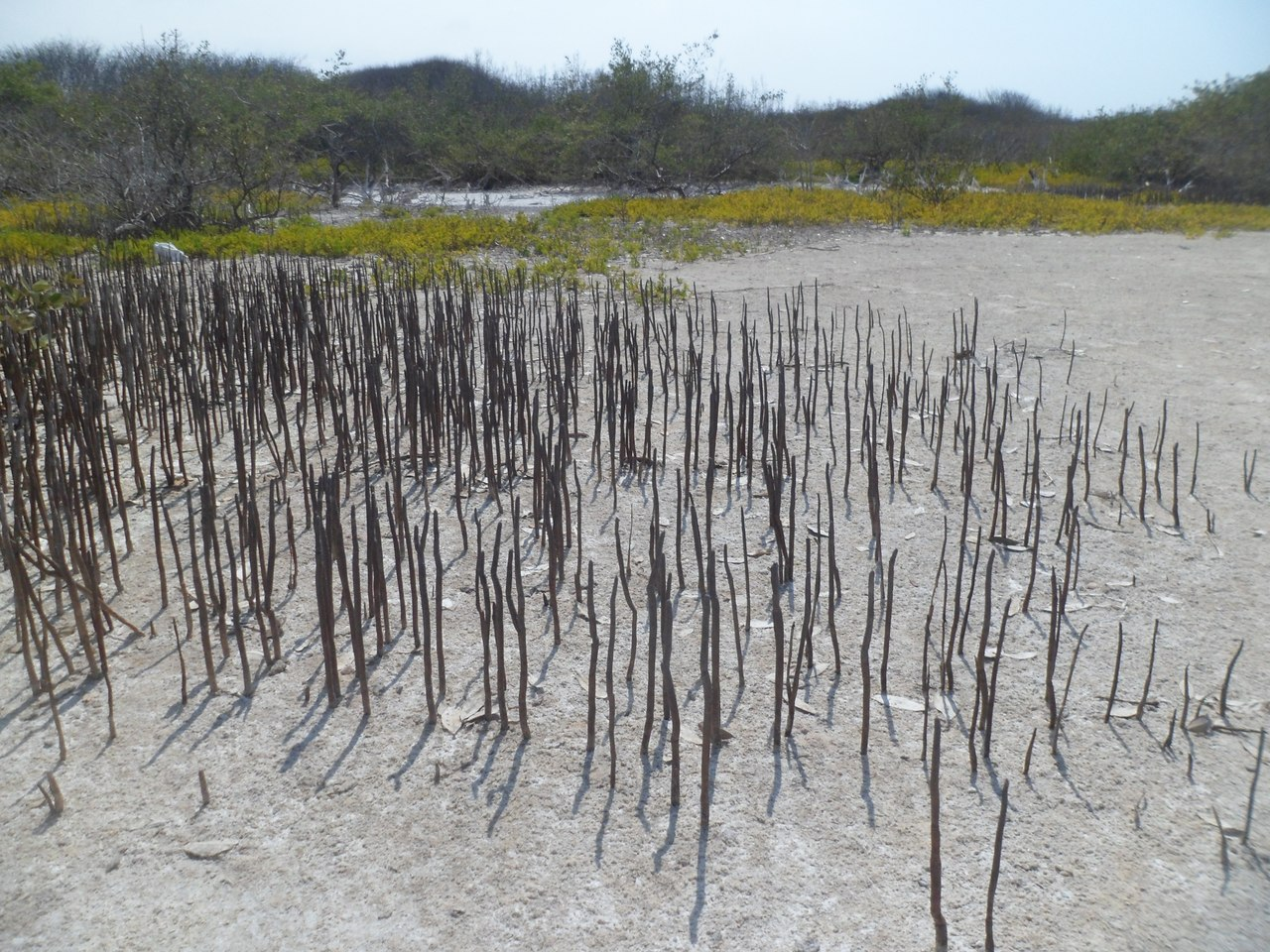
Isla Larga off the coast of the San Esteban National Park

The lowest regions from 2–200 metres (6 ft 7 in – 656 ft 2 in) above sea level are semi-arid and hold dense xerophytic scrub vegetation include thorny plants 3–8 metres (9.8–26.2 ft) high, mostly from the cactus, Fabaceae and Capparaceae families. Species in the dense thorn forest include Bourreria cumanensis, Caesalpinia coriaria, Caesalpinia vesicaria, Cereus hexagonus, Chloroleucon mangense, Coccoloba ramosissima, Cynophalla hastata, Parkinsonia praecox, Pereskia guamacho, Piptadenia flava, Prosopis juliflora, Vachellia macracantha, Vachellia tortuosa, Xylosoma benthamii and species from the Erythroxylum, Jacquinia and Mimosa genera.

There are savannas with tall grasses, shrubs and palms throughout the region, with plants such as Axonopus aureus, Borreria aristeguietana, Bowdichia virgilioides, Byrsonima crassifolia, Casearia sylvestris, Cochlospermum vitifolium, Copaifera officinalis, Curatella americana, Godmania aesculifolia, Leptocoryphium lanatum, Polycarpaea corymbosa, Stilpnopappus pittieri, Trachypogon plumosus, Vochysia venezolana and species of the Andropogon, Bulbostylis, Panicum and Rhynchospora genera. The west of the region has herbaceous savannas that include Axonopus canescens, Bowdichia virgilioides, Curatella americana, Leptocoryphium lanatum, Trachypogon plumus and Paspalum species. Borreria aristeguietana and Stilpnopappus pittieri are endemic to the ecoregion.

=== Fauna ===
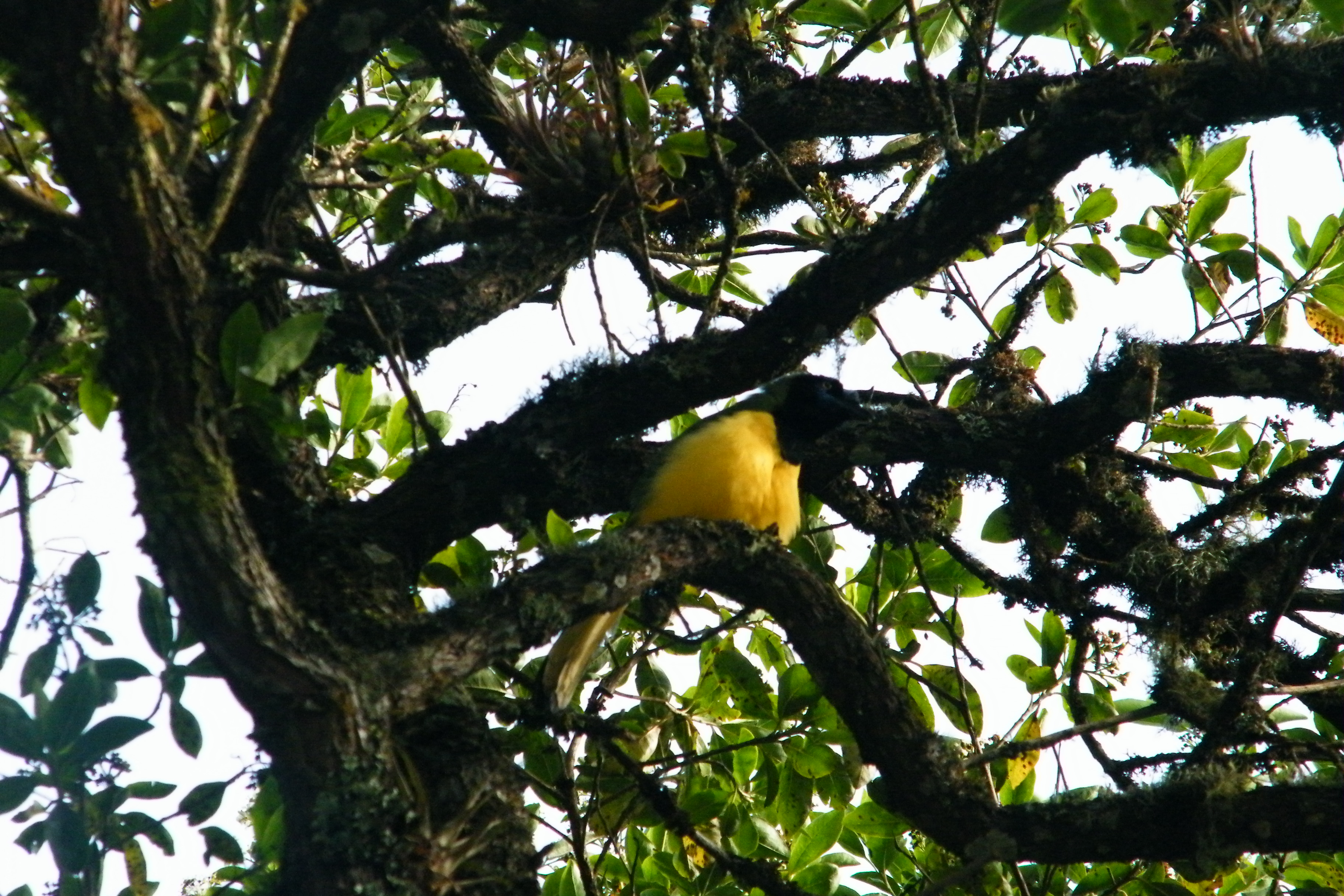
Bird in the El Ávila National Park

Endemic mammals found in this and other dry forest ecoregions in Colombia and Venezuela include the Guajira mouse opossum (Marmosa xerophila) and Hummelinck's vesper mouse (Calomys hummelincki). Endemic birds include the yellow-shouldered amazon (Amazona barbadensis), Maracaibo tody-flycatcher (Todirostrum viridanum), pygmy palm swift (Tachornis furcata), buffy hummingbird (Leucippus fallax), chestnut piculet (Picumnus cinnamomeus), white-whiskered spinetail (Synallaxis candei), black-backed antshrike (Thamnophilus melanonotus), slender-billed inezia (Inezia tenuirostris), Tocuyo sparrow (Arremonops tocuyensis) and vermilion cardinal (Cardinalis phoeniceus). Endangered birds include the rusty-flanked crake (Laterallus levraudi), plain-flanked rail (Rallus wetmorei) and red siskin (Spinus cucullatus).

== Status ==
The World Wildlife Fund gives the ecoregion the status of "Critical/Endangered". There is a large human population that dates back to 16th century colonists from Europe. Most of the natural habitat has been destroyed, particularly in the lower areas, replaced by a patchwork of towns, farm fields and pastures. A few areas of natural savanna and thorn forest remain. The El Ávila National Park and San Esteban National Park hold small areas of xeric shrubland. Other protected areas include the Mochima National Park and the Henri Pittier National Park.

== Sources ==
- "La Costa xeric shrublands", Global Species, Myers Enterprises II
- Locklin, Claudia, Northern South America: North-central and coastal Venezuela (NT1309), WWF: World Wildlife Fund
- WildFinder, WWF: World Wildlife Fund
