= Mannophryne caquetio =

Churuguara rocket frog

Conservation status
- Endangered (IUCN 3.1)

Scientific classification
- Kingdom: Animalia
- Phylum: Chordata
- Class: Amphibia
- Order: Anura
- Family: Aromobatidae
- Genus: Mannophryne
- Species: M. caquetio

Binomial name
- Mannophryne caquetio Mijares-Urrutia & Arends, 1999

Species of frog

The Churuguara rocket frog (Mannophryne caquetio) also or known Churuguara poison-arrow frog and Churuguara collared frog is a species of frog in the family Aromobatidae.It lives in the Cordillera de la Costa mountains Falcón in northern Venezuela.

== Habitat ==
This diurnal frog lives in riparian habitats near narrow creeks on mountains. It has been observed near roads, so scientists think it can tolerate some habitat disturbance. Scientists observed the frog between 750 and 900 meters above sea level.

Scientists have reported the frog in one protected park: Cueva de la Quebrada El Toro National Park.

== Reproduction ==
The male frogs perch near rocks and call to the female frogs. Scientists infer that this species reproduces in the same manner as its congeners: The female frog lays eggs on land. After the eggs hatch, the male frogs carry the tadpoles to water.

== Threats ==
The IUCN classifies this frog as endangered and the Venezuelan Fauna Red List classifies it as critically endangered. It is subject to habitat loss in favor of small-scale agriculture, urbanization, and other purposes. The diversion of water from streams and the use of agrochemicals also poses some threat.
