= Lara–Falcón dry forests =

Ecoregion in Venezuela

Lara-Falcón dry forests (NT0219)
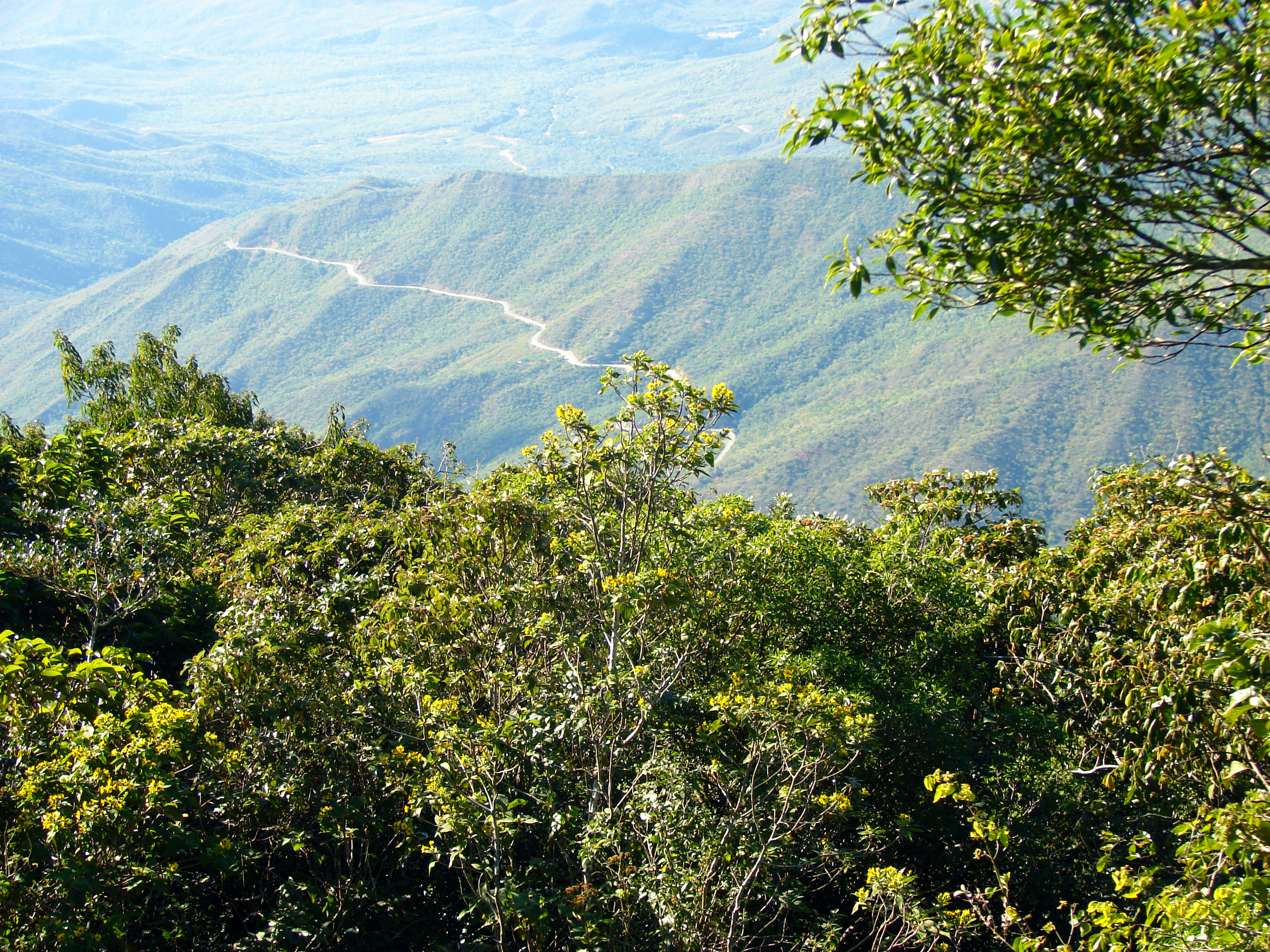
- Peak of Cerro Galicia, Curimagua, Sierra de San Luis

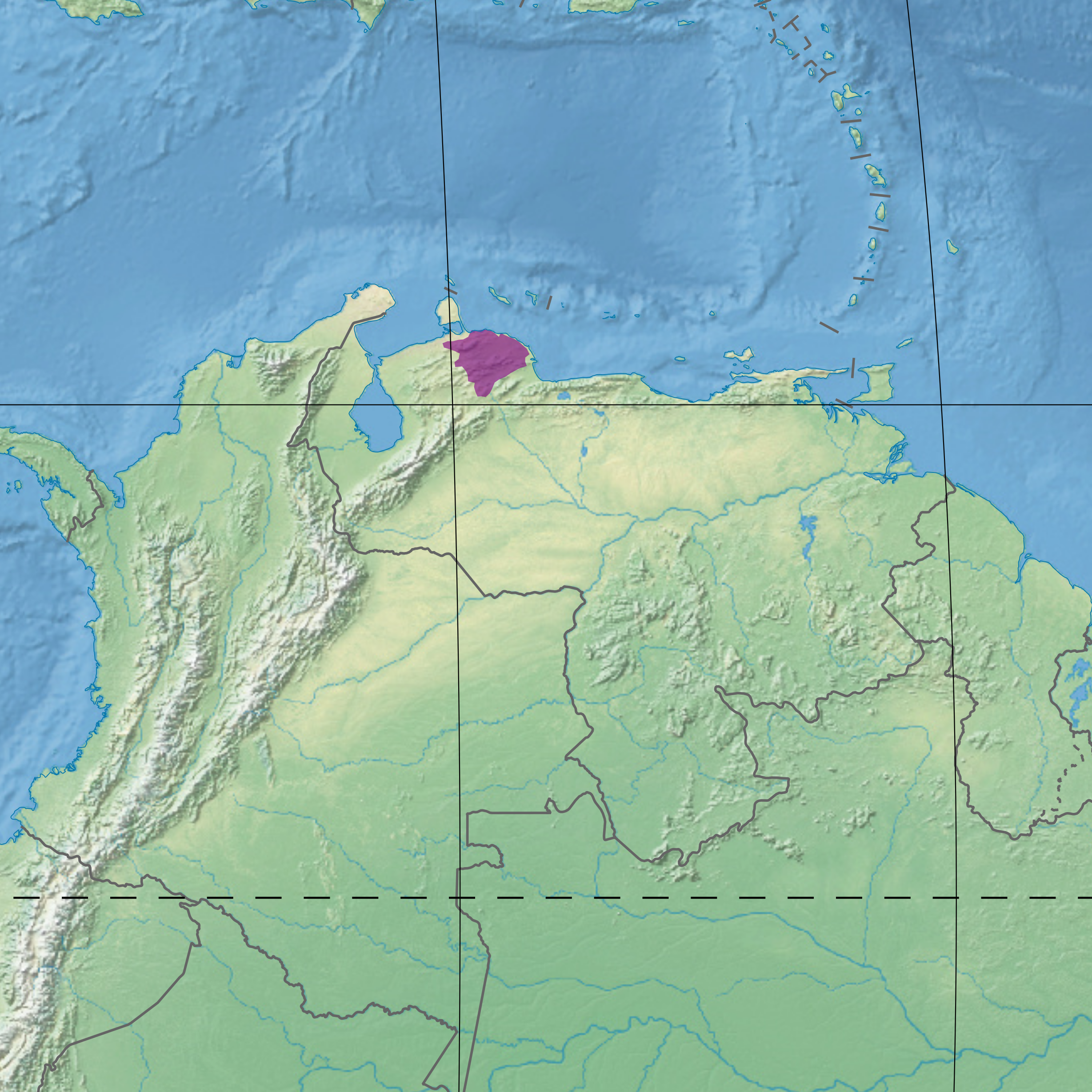
- Ecoregion territory (in purple)

Ecology
- Realm: Neotropical
- Biome: Tropical and subtropical dry broadleaf forests

Geography
- Area: 16,835 km^{2} (6,500 sq mi)
- Countries: Venezuela
- Coordinates: 10.879°N 69.152°W
- Climate type: Aw: equatorial, winter dry

The Lara–Falcón dry forests (NT0219) is an ecoregion that extends inland from the Caribbean coast of northwestern Venezuela. To the east and west the dry forests of the hilly region transition into xeric shrublands. There are several endemic bird species including the vulnerable yellow-shouldered amazon, in demand as a pet. There are few protected areas. Despite the relatively infertile soils, a large part of the ecoregion has been converted to farmland or pasturage.

== Geography ==
=== Location ===
The Lara–Falcón dry forests ecoregion is in parts of the states of Lara and Falcón. It has an area of 1,683,492 hectares (4,160,000 acres). It is south of the Paraguaná Peninsula and north of the Venezuelan Andes to the east of Lake Maracaibo. It extends from just south of Coro, Falcón state, to just north of Barquisimeto, Lara state. The ecoregion extends to the Caribbean sea in the northeast, with patches of Amazon-Orinoco-Southern Caribbean mangroves along some sections of the shore. To the southeast it transitions into the La Costa xeric shrublands and a section of the Cordillera de la Costa montane forests. To the south, west and northwest it gives way to Paraguana xeric scrub.

=== Terrain ===
The Lara–Falcón dry forests ecoregion contains the Sierra de San Luis, the most eastern part of the Sierra de Falcón. In the south it reaches the Sierra de Aroa. The mountains, valleys and plains have elevations of 100–1,300 metres (330–4,270 ft) above sea level. There are varied microclimates at different elevations. Soils are relatively infertile ultisols and oxisols. Major rivers include the Hueque, Tocuyo and Aroa.

=== Climate ===
Mean temperatures is 27–28 °C (81–82 °F). Annual rainfall is 300–1,000 millimetres (12–39 in). At a sample location at coordinates 10.75°N 69.25°W the Köppen climate classification is "Aw": equatorial, winter dry. Mean temperatures at this location range from 24.5 °C (76.1 °F) in January to 26.8 °C (80.2 °F) in September. Total annual rainfall varies considerably from one year to another, but averages about 850 millimetres (33 in). Monthly rainfall varies from 8.9 millimetres (0.35 in) in February to 129.3 millimetres (5.09 in) in July.

== Ecology ==
The Lara–Falcón dry forests ecoregion is in the neotropical realm, in the tropical and subtropical dry broadleaf forests biome. At a global level, tropical dry forests are the third most critically endangered biome. 48.5% of the biome has been cleared and only 7.6% is protected.

=== Flora ===
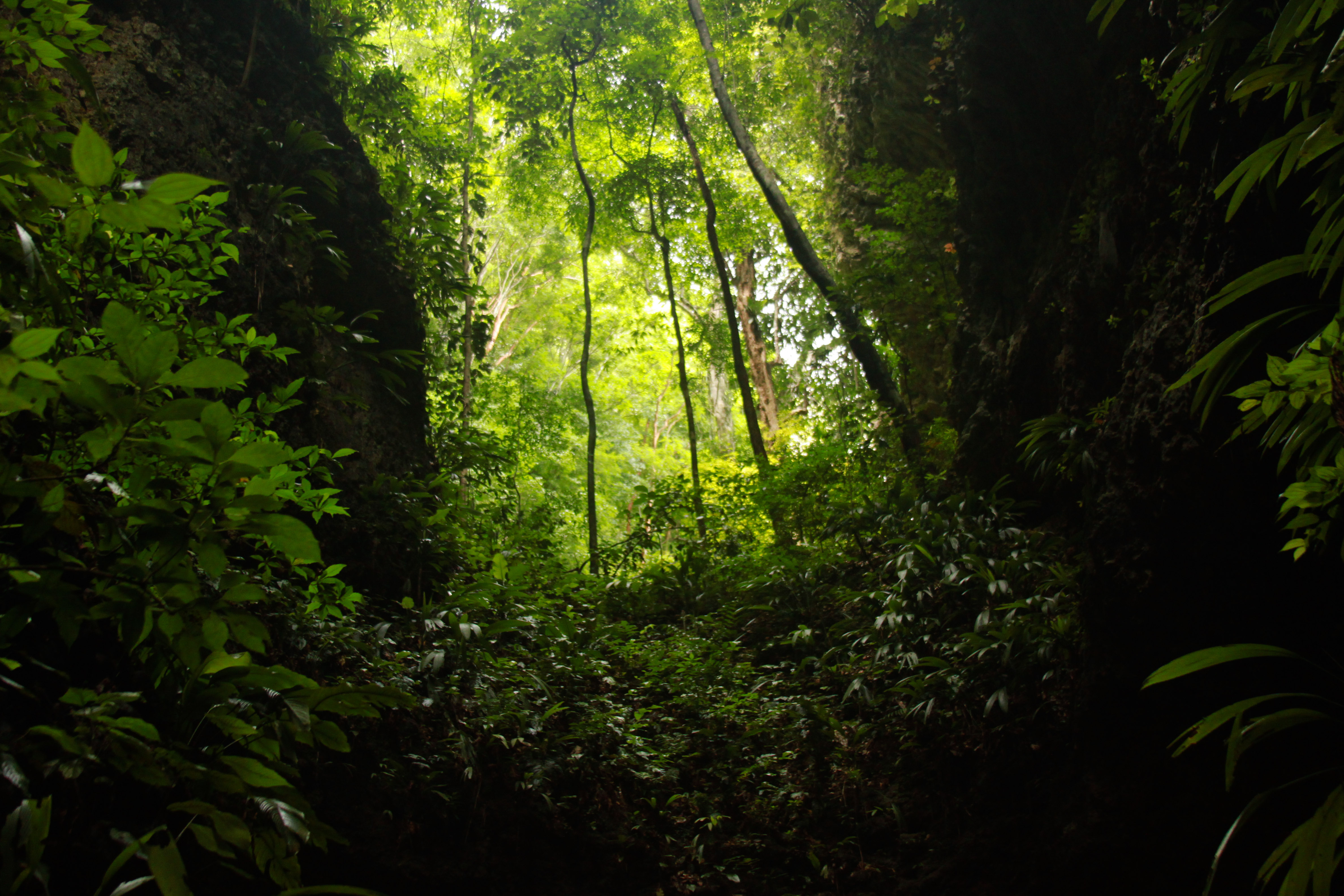
Cueva de la Quebrada del Toro National Park

The vegetation is adapted to the dry climate and includes dense deciduous dry forest and thorn forest with cacti, mesquite trees and spiny shrubs. Small patches of seasonal evergreen woodland are found along rivers and on hilltops. The varied microclimates support a variety of types of vegetation including seasonal evergreen lowland forest in the southeast, similar to that found in the Cordillera de la Costa montane forests, dry deciduous lowland forest and submontane forest. The upper slopes and summits of the Sierra San Luis contain dense, medium height cloud forests, with two strata of trees and a dense understory. The dry deciduous forests of the Lara–Falcon hills are fairly open, 8–15 metres (26–49 ft) high, and have dense undergrowth. The main flora are Handroanthus billbergii, Roseodendron chryseum (araguán), Bulnesia arborea (Maracaibo lignum vitae), Bourreria cumanensis, Caesalpinia coriaria (divi-divi), Pereskia guamacho (leafy cactus) and Prosopis juliflora (mesquite).

The only endemic plant is Apoplanesia cryptantha (family Fabaceae), found in the eastern deciduous forests. Other plant species in the deciduous forests include Acanthocereus colombianus (cactus), Capparis linearis, Capparis odoratissima, Capparis tenuisiliqua, Castela erecta, Cercidium praecox, Croton rhamnifolius, Cynophalla hastata, Cynophalla flexuosa, Ipomoea carnea (pink morning glory), Jatropha gossypiifolia (bellyache bush), Libidibia coriaria, Machaerium robiniaefolium, Morisonia americana, Pachira quinata, Pereskia colombiana, Piptadenia flava, Pithecellobium dulce, Pithecellobium unguis-cati, Poponax tortuosa, Randia armata, Stenocereus griseus (dagger cactus), Talisia olivaeformis, Vachellia farnesiana (sweet acacia) and species of the genera Cassia, Eugenia, Guapira, Hyptis, Lonchocarpus, Opuntia, Platymiscium and Zanthoxylum.

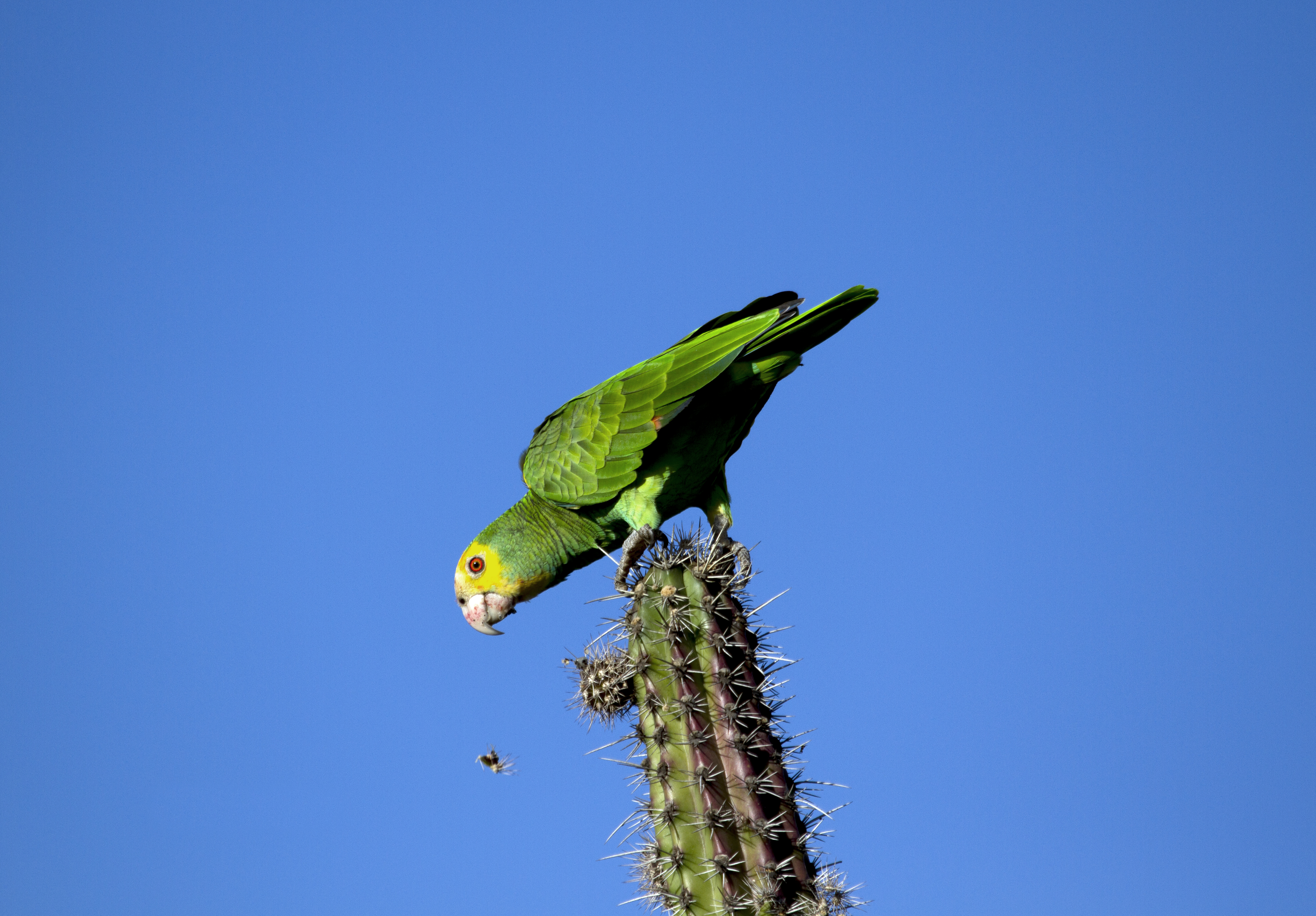
The yellow-shouldered amazon (Amazona barbadensis) is threatened by illegal capture for sale as a pet.

=== Fauna ===
The only endemic mammal is the Guajira mouse opossum (Marmosa xerophila), found in this and other dry forest ecoregions in the north of Venezuela and Colombia. It is mostly found in the deciduous forest. There are many endemic birds in the arid lowland area including the yellow-shouldered amazon (Amazona barbadensis), Maracaibo tody-flycatcher (Todirostrum viridanum), pygmy palm swift (Tachornis furcata), buffy hummingbird (Leucippus fallax), chestnut piculet (Picumnus cinnamomeus), white-whiskered spinetail (Synallaxis candei), black-backed antshrike (Thamnophilus melanonotus), slender-billed inezia (Inezia tenuirostris), Tocuyo sparrow (Arremonops tocuyensis) and vermilion cardinal (Cardinalis phoeniceus). Endangered birds include the plain-flanked rail (Rallus wetmorei) and the red siskin (Spinus cucullatus).

== Status ==
The World Wildlife Fund gives the ecoregion the status of "Critical/Endangered". The habitat has badly damaged by farming and grazing, particularly the north and center of the region. The vulnerable yellow-shouldered amazon is illegally collected for sale as a pet. As of 2002 of the 17,447.4 square kilometres (6,736.5 sq mi) in the ecoregion, 6,074.1 square kilometres (2,345.2 sq mi) or 34.8% had natural cover or extractive land use, while the remainder had been converted to agricultural land, including pasturage. A 2006 book stated that of the 17,563.25 square kilometres (6,781.21 sq mi) of the ecoregion, 64.6% of the habitat had been transformed by human activity. Only 8.1% or 1,427.3 square kilometres (551.1 sq mi) was protected. The 8,500 hectares (21,000 acres) Cueva de la Quebrada del Toro National Park protects the portion of the ecoregion in the Sierra de Falcón, including a dramatic cave. The Juan Crisóstomo Falcón National Park also protects part of the region.

== Sources ==
- De Ferranti, David M. (1 January 2005), Beyond the City: The Rural Contribution to Development, World Bank Publications, ISBN 978-0-8213-6097-2
- Kunkel, Peter; Linden, Charles Vander; Beudels, Roseline C.; Elst, Marie-des-Neiges van der; Lafontaine, René-Marie; Iremonger, Susan; Beudels, Marie-Odile; Laurent, Yves; Kerwyn, Chris; Moss, Dorian; Craig, Wendi; Devillers, Anne (May 1996), Biotopes / Ecosystems Nomenclature Habitats of South America (PDF), Institut Royal des Sciences Naturelles / Institute of Terrestrial Ecology
- "Lara-Falcón dry forests", Global Species, Myers Enterprises II
- Locklin, Claudia, Northern South America: Northern Venezuela (NT0219), WWF: World Wildlife Fund
- Oatham, Michael P.; Boodram, Natalie (2006), "Gap analysis of neotropical dry forests in protected areas using geographical information systems and global datasets" (PDF), Tropical Ecology, 47 (2), International Society for Tropical Ecology, ISSN 0564-3295, archived from the original on September 3, 2016
- WildFinder, WWF: World Wildlife Fund
- Zimmerer, Karl S. (15 September 2006), Globalization and New Geographies of Conservation, University of Chicago Press, ISBN 978-0-226-98344-8
