= Mannophryne urticans =

Conservation status
- Near Threatened (IUCN 3.1)

Scientific classification
- Kingdom: Animalia
- Phylum: Chordata
- Class: Amphibia
- Order: Anura
- Family: Aromobatidae
- Genus: Mannophryne
- Species: M. urticans

Binomial name
- Mannophryne urticans Barrio-Amorós, Santos, and Molina, 2010

Species of frog

Mannophryne urticans, the urticant collared frog, is a species of frog in the family Aromobatidae. It has been observed in the Cordillera de Mérida in Mérida, Venezuela.

== Habitat ==
This diurnal frog lives in riparian habitats. It has also been observed in streams in secondary forests, coffee farms, cocoa farms, and culverts near roads. Scientists observed the frog between 285 and 1168 meters above sea level.

Scientists have not seen this frog in any protected parks, but there is a probable range overlap with Sierra de la Culata National Park.

== Reproduction ==
The male frogs call to the female frogs. Scientists infer that this frog has young the same way other frogs in Mannophryne do: The female frogs lay eggs on land. After the eggs hatch, the male frogs carry the tadpoles to water.

== Threats ==
The IUCN and Venezuelan Fauna Red List both classify this species as near threatened. Its principal threats are habitat loss in favor of livestock and agriculture, water pollution, fires, and diversion of water. Scientists consider emerging diseases a possible threat.

== Original description ==
- Barrio-Amoros CL; Santos JC; Molina CR (2010). "An addition to the diversity of dendrobatid frogs in Venezuela: description of three new collared frogs (Anura: Dendrobatidae: Mannophryne)". Phyllomedusa. 9: 3–35.
