= Mannophryne oblitterata =

Conservation status
- Near Threatened (IUCN 3.1)

Scientific classification
- Kingdom: Animalia
- Phylum: Chordata
- Class: Amphibia
- Order: Anura
- Family: Aromobatidae
- Genus: Mannophryne
- Species: M. oblitterata

Binomial name
- Mannophryne oblitterata (Rivero, 1984)

Synonyms
- Colostethus guatopoensis Dixon & Rivero-Blanco, 1985

Species of frog

Mannophryne oblitterata is a species of frog in the family Aromobatidae. It is endemic to Venezuela.

== Habitat ==
This diurnal, riparian frog lives near streams on mountains and in low places. It has also been found in metal water culverts, so scientists believe it may tolerate some habitat disturbance. Scientists saw the frog between 131 and 734 meters above sea level.

The frog's known range overlaps with one protected park: Guatopo National Park.

== Reproduction ==
The male frogs hide under rocks and call to the female frogs. Scientists infer that the female frog lays eggs on the leaf litter near streams. After the eggs hatch, the male frogs carry the tadpoles to water.

== Threats ==
This frog is classified as near threatened by the IUCN and as data deficient by the Venezuelan Fauna Red List. Its principal threats are habitat loss, including habitat loss in favor of agriculture. Scientists have not yet reported the fungus Batrachochytrium dendrobatidis on this species, so they do not know how much of a threat the fungal disease chytridiomycosis may pose.
