= Mannophryne orellana =

Conservation status
- Endangered (IUCN 3.1)

Scientific classification
- Kingdom: Animalia
- Phylum: Chordata
- Class: Amphibia
- Order: Anura
- Family: Aromobatidae
- Genus: Mannophryne
- Species: M. orellana

Binomial name
- Mannophryne orellana Barrio-Amorós, Santos, and Molina, 2010

Species of frog

Mannophryne orellana, or Orellana's collared frog, is a frog in the family Aromobatidae. It has been found in the Cordillera de Mérida and Cordillera Oriental de Colombia in Venezuela. Scientists believe it may also live in nearby Colombia.

== Habitat ==
This diurnal, riparian frog lives near streams in forests on mountains. It has been found near streams in secondary forests and some culverts next to roads. Scientists found the frog between 482 and 1192 meters above sea level.

Scientists saw the frog in one protected park: El Tamá National Park. The frog lives near Tapo-Caparo National Park.

== Reproduction ==
The male frogs call to the female frogs. Scientists think this frog has young the same manner as its congeners: The female frogs lay eggs on land. After the eggs hatch, the male frogs carry the tadpoles to water.

== Threats ==
The IUCN Red List classifies this frog as endangered and the Venezuelan Fauna Red List classifies it as near threatened. Although part of this population lives in a protected park, the enforcement of those laws is limited. The frog is subject to habitat loss associated with agriculture and livestock cultivation. People also divert water from streams for irrigation. Agrochemicals, waste, and sewage can also harm the frog.

== Original description ==
- Barrio-Amoros CL; Santos JC; Molina CR (2010). "An addition to the diversity of dendrobatid frogs in Venezuela: description of three new collared frogs (Anura: Dendrobatidae: Mannophryne)". Phyllomedusa. 9: 3–35.
