= Mannophryne lamarcai =

Conservation status
- Endangered (IUCN 3.1)

Scientific classification
- Kingdom: Animalia
- Phylum: Chordata
- Class: Amphibia
- Order: Anura
- Family: Aromobatidae
- Genus: Mannophryne
- Species: M. lamarcai

Binomial name
- Mannophryne lamarcai Mijares-Urrutia, 1999

Species of frog

Mannophryne lamarcai is a species of frog in the family Aromobatidae. It is endemic to Venezuela and inhabits a narrow altitudinal band in the Ziruma mountains between the states of Zulia, Falcón and Lara.

== Habitat ==
This diurnal, riparian frog lives near permanent and temporary streams on mountains. It has also been observed in a few grassy areas and near secondary forest, so scientists infer it has some tolerance to habitat disturbance. Scientists saw the frog between 600 and 1460 meters above sea level.

The frog's range overlaps many protected areas: Cuenca Alta de los Ríos Matícora y Cocuiza, Cuenca Alta y Media del Río Machango, Piedemonte Andino-Serranía de Misoa-Trujillo, Burro Negro Dams Protective Zone, Burro Negro National Hydraulic Reserve, and Maticora y Cocuiza Forest Area Under Protection.

== Reproduction ==
The male frogs perch on rocks and call to the female frogs. Scientists infer that this frog reproduces in the same manner as its congeners: The female frog lays eggs on land. After the eggs hatch, the male frogs carry the tadpoles to water.

== Threats ==
The IUCN lists this frog as endangered and the Venezuelan Fauna Red List lists it as critically endangered. The principal threats are habitat loss associated with agriculture and other uses, water pollution, and climate change.
