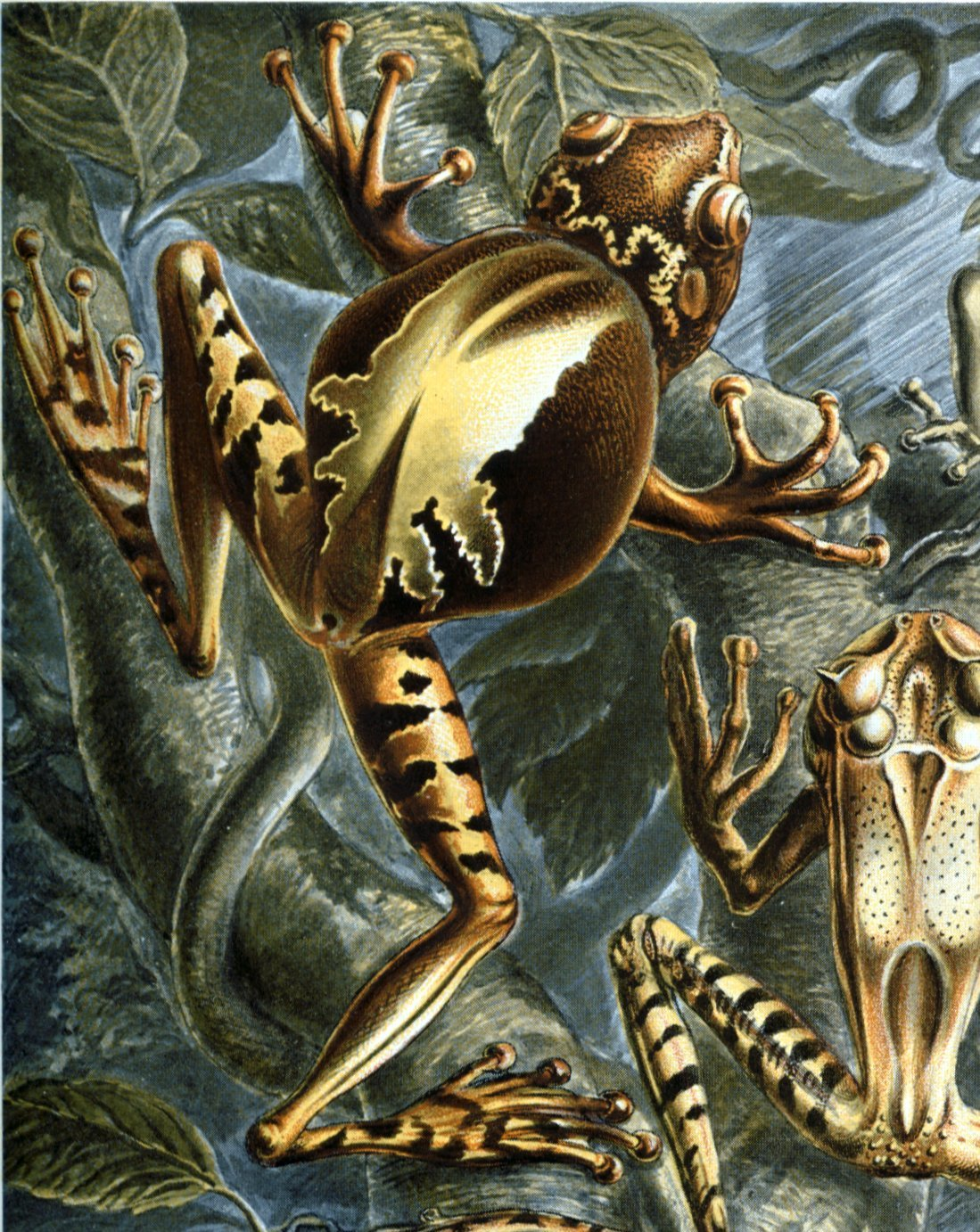
- Gastrotheca ovifera in Ernst Haeckel's Kunstformen der Natur

Conservation status
- Vulnerable (IUCN 3.1)

Scientific classification
- Kingdom: Animalia
- Phylum: Chordata
- Class: Amphibia
- Order: Anura
- Family: Hemiphractidae
- Genus: Gastrotheca
- Species: G. ovifera

Binomial name
- Gastrotheca ovifera (Lichtenstein and Weinland, 1854)

Synonyms
- Notodelphys ovifera Lichtenstein and Weinland, 1854; Notodelphis dorsigera Schlegel, 1858; Hyla vogli Müller, 1938

= Gastrotheca ovifera =

Species of frog

Gastrotheca ovifera (vernacular names: pouched frog and giant marsupial frog; Spanish: rana marsupial comun or rana marsupial) is a species of frog in the family Hemiphractidae. It is endemic to northern Venezuela and is known from the Venezuelan Coastal Range, including Sierra de Aroa.

Gastrotheca ovifera occurs in cloud forests at elevations of 800–1,800 m (2,600–5,900 ft) above sea level. It is associated with bromeliads where it hides, especially during dry periods. The eggs are carried on the female's back and have direct development (i.e., there is no free-living larval stage).

== Range ==
Scientists have reported the frog in protected places: El Ávila National Park, San Esteban National Park, Yurubí National Park, and Henri Pittier National Park.

== Threats ==
The IUCN classifies this species as vulnerable to extinction. It can be locally abundant, but it has declined in many places where it used to be common. It is threatened by habitat loss caused by agriculture, logging, and infrastructure development. However, it has also declined in protected areas such as the Henri Pittier National Park, for reasons that are unclear.
