= Mannophryne leonardoi =

Conservation status
- Near Threatened (IUCN 3.1)

Scientific classification
- Kingdom: Animalia
- Phylum: Chordata
- Class: Amphibia
- Order: Anura
- Family: Aromobatidae
- Genus: Mannophryne
- Species: M. leonardoi

Binomial name
- Mannophryne leonardoi Manzanilla, La Marca, Jowers, Sánchez, and García-París, 2007

Species of frog

The Turimiquire collared frog (Mannophryne leonardoi) is a frog in the family Aromobatidae. It has been found in the Macizo del Turimiquire in northeastern Venezuela.

== Description ==
The adult female frog measures 22.0–24.2 mm in snout-vent length and the adult male frog 19.5–20.7 mm. The male frog has yellow pigmentation on its chest and neck and the adult female frog has gray pigmentation.

== Habitat ==
This diurnal frog usually lives in riparian habitats on mountains. During the rainy season, it ventures further into the forest. At these times, the frogs can travel from one body of water to another. Scientists saw the frog between 156 and 1650 meters above sea level.

The frog's known range includes two protected parks: Mochima National Park and Cueva del Guácharo National Park. Much of the rest its range is in the Macizo de Turmiquire Protective Zone of Rivers, but this is not as strictly protected as the national parks.

== Reproduction ==
The male frogs perch on rocks next to streams and call to the female frogs during the day. Scientists infer the frog has young the same way as its congeners: The female frog lays eggs near streams, and, after the eggs hatch, the male frogs carry the tadpoles to water.

== Threats ==
The IUCN classifies this frog as near threatened. Its principal threats are habitat loss associated with small-scale farming, animal husbandry, diversion of surface water, pollution from agrochemicals, and hydroelectric dams.
