= Mannophryne speeri =

Conservation status
- Critically Endangered (IUCN 3.1)

Scientific classification
- Kingdom: Animalia
- Phylum: Chordata
- Class: Amphibia
- Order: Anura
- Family: Aromobatidae
- Genus: Mannophryne
- Species: M. speeri

Binomial name
- Mannophryne speeri La Marca, 2009

Species of frog

Mannophryne speeri, or Speer's collared frog, is a frog in the family Aromobatidae. It has been found in the Sierra de Portuguesa in Lara, Venezuela.

== Description ==
The adult male frog measures about 19.5 mm long in snout-vent length and the adult female frog is 23.5 mm long. The frog has a wide collar. There is a stripe that starts at the eye.

== Habitat ==
This frog lives in forests with high humidity. Scientists observed it in a tributary of the Morador River between 800 and 1700 meters above sea level.

Scientists have not observed the frog in any protected places, but there are two nearby: Parque Nacional Dinira and Parque Nacional El Guache.

== Reproduction ==
Scientists infer that the frog has young the same way as other frogs in Mannophryne: The female frog lays eggs near streams, and, after the eggs hatch, the adult frogs carry the tadpoles to water.

== Threats ==
The IUCN classifies this frog as critically endangered. Its principal threat is habitat loss in favor of agriculture, especially coffee.
