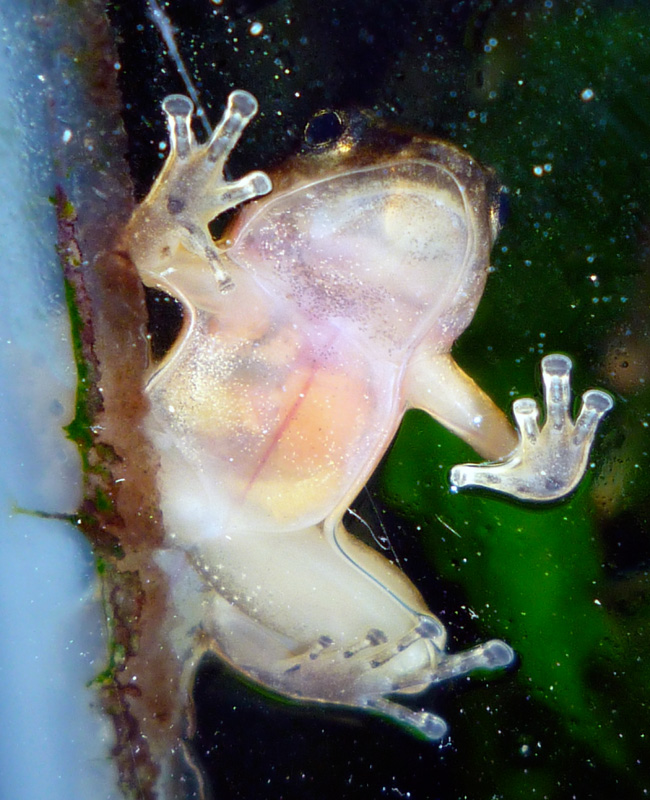
- Mannophryne trinitatis

Scientific classification
- Kingdom: Animalia
- Phylum: Chordata
- Class: Amphibia
- Order: Anura
- Family: Aromobatidae
- Subfamily: Aromobatinae
- Genus: Mannophryne; La Marca, 1992

Type species
- Colostethus yustizi La Marca, 1989

Diversity
- See text

= Mannophryne =

Genus of amphibians

Mannophryne is a genus of frogs native to Venezuela and Trinidad and Tobago. They are sometimes known as the fingered poison frogs. This genus was created in 1992 and corresponds to the former Colostethus trinitatis species group. All species have a dark throat collar.

== Species ==
Mannophryne contains 20 species, many of which used to be classified in the genus Colostethus:

- Mannophryne caquetio Mijares-Urrutia and Arends-R., 1999
- Mannophryne collaris (Boulenger, 1912)
- Mannophryne cordilleriana La Marca, 1995
- Mannophryne herminae (Boettger, 1893)
- Mannophryne lamarcai Mijares-Urrutia and Arends-R., 1999
- Mannophryne larandina (Yústiz, 1991)
- Mannophryne leonardoi Manzanilla et al., 2007
- Mannophryne molinai Rojas-Runjaic, Matta-Pereira, and La Marca, 2018
- Mannophryne neblina (Test, 1956)
- Mannophryne oblitterata (Rivero, 1984)
- Mannophryne olmonae (Hardy, 1983)
- Mannophryne orellana Barrio-Amorós, Santos, and Molina, 2010
- Mannophryne riveroi (Donoso-Barros, 1965)
- Mannophryne speeri La Marca, 2009
- Mannophryne trinitatis (Garman, 1888)
- Mannophryne trujillensis Vargas Galarce & La Marca, 2007
- Mannophryne urticans Barrio-Amorós, Santos, and Molina, 2010
- Mannophryne venezuelensis Manzanilla et al., 2007
- Mannophryne vulcano Barrio-Amorós, Santos, and Molina, 2010
- Mannophryne yustizi (La Marca, 1989)
