= Mannophryne riveroi =

Conservation status
- Endangered (IUCN 3.1)

Scientific classification
- Kingdom: Animalia
- Phylum: Chordata
- Class: Amphibia
- Order: Anura
- Family: Aromobatidae
- Genus: Mannophryne
- Species: M. riveroi

Binomial name
- Mannophryne riveroi (Donoso-Barros, 1965)

Synonyms
- Prestherapis riveroi Donoso-Barros, 1965; Prostherapis riveroi Donoso-Barros, 1965; Colostethus riveroi Edwards, 1971; Mannophryne riveroi La Marca, 1992

Species of frog

Mannophryne riveroi is a species of frog in the family Aromobatidae. It is endemic to Venezuela, where it has been found in the Cerro Azul on the Península de Paria in Sucre.

== Home ==
This diurnal, riparian frog lives in streams that flow through cloud forests in montane and submontane areas. Scientists have observed the frog between 400 and 1000 meters above sea level.

While scientists have not reported the frog inside any protected areas, there is one protected park that overlaps with the frog's range, Península de Paria National Park.

== Reproduction ==
The male perches sits on rocks and calls to the female frogs. Scientists have not observed this species' reproductive biology but they infer that it is similar to that of other frogs in this family, The male frogs carry the tadpoles to water after the eggs hatch.

== Threats ==
The IUCN classifies this frog as endangered. Its principal threat is habitat loss associated with logging and small-scale agriculture. Scientists consider the fungal disease chytridiomycosis a possible threat, but they have yet to detect the causitive fungus Batrachochytrium dendrobatidis in the area.
