= Mannophryne collaris =

Conservation status
- Endangered (IUCN 3.1)

Scientific classification
- Kingdom: Animalia
- Phylum: Chordata
- Class: Amphibia
- Order: Anura
- Family: Aromobatidae
- Genus: Mannophryne
- Species: M. collaris

Binomial name
- Mannophryne collaris (Boulenger, 1912)

Species of frog

Mannophryne collaris (common names: collared poison frog and Mérida's collared frog) is a species of frog in the family Aromobatidae. It is endemic to Venezuela where it is found in the Andes in the state of Mérida.

== Habitat ==
This diurnal, terrestrial frog lives in riparian habitats in semi-deciduous montane forests. Scientists have seen the frog from 224–1,783 m (735–5,850 ft) asl.

== Reproduction ==
The female frog lays her eggs on the leaf litter. The male frog guards the eggs. After the eggs hatch, the male frog carries the tadpoles to water.

== Threats ==
The IUCN classifies this frog as endangered. Its principal threats are habitat loss and habitat fragmentation due to the establishment of residential and commercial areas. The climate has also changed. It about 1 °C hotter than it had been, and there is less rain. Scientists confirmed the presence of Batrachochytrium dendrobatidis on some specimens, but they do not know if the disease chytridiomycosis has killed many of them or not.

== Relationship to humans ==
In 2014, a captive breeding program was established at Chorros de Milla Zoo in the city of Mérida. Some frogs are maintained ex situ, but 110 others have been released back into the wild.
