= Mannophryne molinai =

Conservation status
- Endangered (IUCN 3.1)

Scientific classification
- Kingdom: Animalia
- Phylum: Chordata
- Class: Amphibia
- Order: Anura
- Family: Aromobatidae
- Genus: Mannophryne
- Species: M. molinai

Binomial name
- Mannophryne molinai Rojas-Runjaic, Matta-Pereira, and La Marca, 2018

Species of frog

Mannophryne molinai, the Sierra de Aroa collared frog, is a species of frog in the family Aromobatidae. It lives in the Cordillera de la Costa in Yaracuy, Venezuela and possibly adjacent Colombia.

== Habitat ==
The type locality for this species is La Rondona on the southeast slope of the Sierra de Aroa, which is in the Cordillera de la Costa. This diurnal, riparian frog has been observed in streams in forests on mountains between 143 and 1217 meters above sea level.

Scientists observed the frog in one protected park, Reserva Ecológica Guáquira. The frog's known range also overlaps with Yurubí National Park.

== Reproduction ==
The male frogs call to the female frogs. The female frogs lay eggs on the leaf litter. After the eggs hatch, the male frogs carry the tadpoles to water.

== Threats ==
The IUCN classifies this frog as endangered. Its principal threat is habitat loss in favor of agriculture. Fires and the diversion of surface water for irrigation and household use also pose some threat.

== Original description ==
- Rojas-Runjaic FJM; Matta-Pereira ME; La Marca E (2018). "Unveiling species diversity in collared frogs through morphological and bioacoustic evidence: a new Mannophryne (Amphibia, Aromobatidae) from Sierra de Aroa, northwestern Venezuela, and an amended definition and call description of M. herminae (Boettger, 1893)". Zootaxa (Abstract). 4461 (4): 451–476. doi:10.11646/zootaxa.4461.4.1. PMID 30314062.
