= Mannophryne trujillensis =

Conservation status
- Endangered (IUCN 3.1)

Scientific classification
- Kingdom: Animalia
- Phylum: Chordata
- Class: Amphibia
- Order: Anura
- Family: Aromobatidae
- Genus: Mannophryne
- Species: M. trujillensis

Binomial name
- Mannophryne trujillensis Vargas Galarce & La Marca, 2007

Species of amphibian

Mannophryne trujillensis is an endangered amphibian in the family Aromobatidae. It is native to Cordillera de Mérida, Venezuela.

== Description ==
It differs from other similar species because it features a combination of morphological features.

== Habitat ==
This diurnal, riparian frog is lives near streams on mountains surrounded by lowlands. It can live in streams in secondary forests and other somewhat disturbed areas, such as under roads. Scientists observed the frog between 700 and 1800 meters above sea level.

The frog's known range is near two moderately protected areas: the Santo Domingo-Motatán and Río Castán river protection areas.

== Reproduction ==
The male frogs perch on rocks next to streams and call to the female frogs during the day. Scientists infer that this frog has young the same way as other frogs in Mannophryne: The female frog lays eggs on land, and, after the eggs hatch, the male frogs carry the tadpoles to water.

== Threats ==
The IUCN classifies this frog as endangered. Its principal confirmed threats are habitat loss and pollution. Human beings convert forests to farmland, specifically small-scale cocoa and subsistence agriculture, and areas for raising livestock. Humans also divert water from streams and pollute the area with agrochemicals, waste, and sewage. Scientists believe the fungal disease chytridiomycosis could also kill the frogs.

== Original description ==
- Vargas Galarce, J.Y.; La Marca, E. (2007). "A new species of collared from (Amphibia: Anura: Aromobatidae: Mannophryne) from the Andes of Trujillo state, Venezuela". Herpetotropicos. 3: 51–57.
