= Mannophryne vulcano =

Conservation status
- Near Threatened (IUCN 3.1)

Scientific classification
- Kingdom: Animalia
- Phylum: Chordata
- Class: Amphibia
- Order: Anura
- Family: Aromobatidae
- Genus: Mannophryne
- Species: M. vulcano

Binomial name
- Mannophryne vulcano Barrio-Amorós, Santos, and Molina, 2010

Species of frog

Mannophryne vulcano, the Caracas collared frog, is a frog in the family Aromobatidae. It has been observed in the Sierra de Portuguesa in Lara, Venezuela.

== Habitat ==
This diurnal frog lives in riparian habitats.

Scientists have not observed this in any protected places, but its known range overlaps with Waraira Repano National Park.

== Reproduction ==
The male frogs call to the female frogs openly and from hiding places. The female frogs lay eggs on wet leaves or in moist soil, 12–16 eggs per clutch. The male frogs guard the eggs. After the eggs hatch, the male frogs carry the tadpoles to water.

== Threats ==
The IUCN classifies this frog as near threatened. Water pollution, fires, unregulated tourism, farms, and urbanization can kill frogs or cause habitat loss.

Scientists have found the fungus Batrachochytrium dendrobatidis on this frog, but the species appears to have some resistance to chytridiomycosis.

== Original description ==
- Barrio-Amoros CL; Santos JC; Molina CR (2010). "An addition to the diversity of dendrobatid frogs in Venezuela: description of three new collared frogs (Anura: Dendrobatidae: Mannophryne)". Phyllomedusa. 9: 3–35.
