= Mannophryne neblina =

Rancho Grande rocket frog

Conservation status
- Critically Endangered (IUCN 3.1)

Scientific classification
- Kingdom: Animalia
- Phylum: Chordata
- Class: Amphibia
- Order: Anura
- Family: Aromobatidae
- Genus: Mannophryne
- Species: M. neblina

Binomial name
- Mannophryne neblina (Test, 1956)

Species of frog

The Rancho Grande rocket frog (Mannophryne neblina) also or known Rancho Grande poison-arrow frog and Aragua collared frog is a species of frog in the family Aromobatidae. It is endemic to Venezuela.

== Habitat ==
Scientists have seen the frogs in the type locality, Portachuelo Pass, Rancho Grande, in Aragua, from which it has since disappeared. There are also some reports of this frog in Macizo de Nirgua in Yaracuy.

This diurnal, terrestrial lives in riparian habitats in primary and secondary cloud forests on hills and mountains. Scientists observed the frog between 900 and 1100 meters above sea level.

The type locality is within Henri Pittier National Park.

== Reproduction ==
Scientists have not confirmed all of the frog's reproductive biology but they infer that the female frog lays eggs on the leaf litter. In 1956, Test reported seeing male frogs carrying tadpoles to water.

== Threats ==
Both the IUCN Red List and Venezuelan Fauna Red List classify this species as critically endangered. In the lowlands surrounding the Henri Pittier National Park, it is subject to habitat loss in favor of small-scale cocoa, coffee, and subsistence agriculture. Fires and unregulated tourism also cause problems. Scientists consider chytridiomycosis a possible threat and possible cause of its disappearance from the type locality. The causitive fungus, Batrachochytrium dendrobatidis has been detected on frogs of this species.
