= Mannophryne cordilleriana =

Conservation status
- Vulnerable (IUCN 3.1)

Scientific classification
- Kingdom: Animalia
- Phylum: Chordata
- Class: Amphibia
- Order: Anura
- Family: Aromobatidae
- Genus: Mannophryne
- Species: M. cordilleriana

Binomial name
- Mannophryne cordilleriana La Marca, 1994

Species of frog

Mannophryne cordilleriana is a species of frog in the family Aromobatidae. It is endemic to Venezuela, where it has been found near the Santo Domingo and Calderas Rivers.

== Habitat ==
This frog lives in riparian habitats in montane and submontane forests. Scientists observed the frog between 1300 and 1950 meters above sea level.

Scientists found the frog in one protected area, the Protective Zone of the Santo Domingo River. The frog's range also overlaps Sierra Nevada National Park.

== Reproduction ==
The female frogs lay eggs on land. The male frogs guard the eggs. After the eggs hatch, the male frogs carry the tadpoles in pools near streams.

== Threats ==
The IUCN classifies this frog as vulnerable. The principal threats to frogs in Mannophryne are habitat loss related to agriculture and other purposes, diversion of streams for irrigation, and pollution, such as waste from the Trans-Andean Highway. Scientists have detected the fungus Batrachochytrium dendrobatidis on this species but they have not fully assessed the threat posed by the fungal disease chytridiomycosis.
