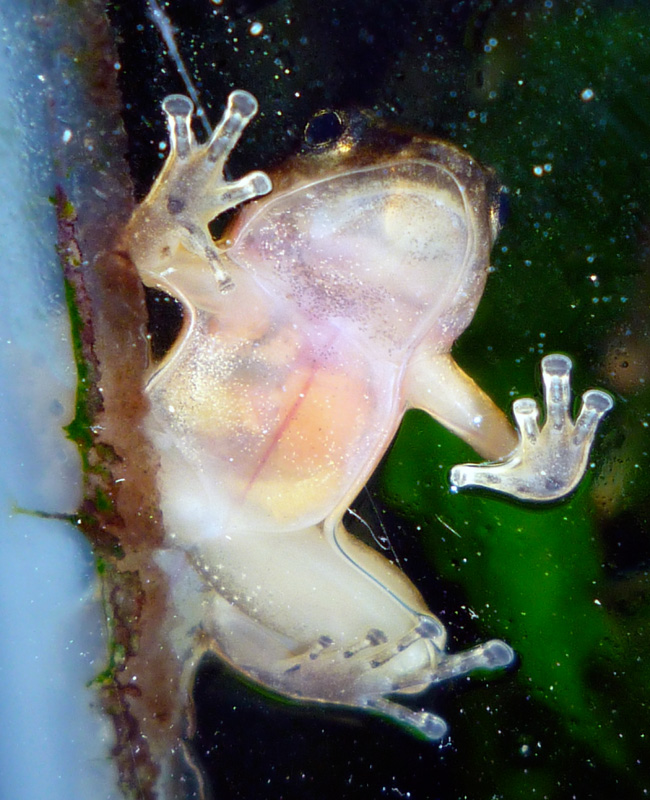

Conservation status
- Least Concern (IUCN 3.1)

Scientific classification
- Kingdom: Animalia
- Phylum: Chordata
- Class: Amphibia
- Order: Anura
- Family: Aromobatidae
- Genus: Mannophryne
- Species: M. trinitatis

Binomial name
- Mannophryne trinitatis (Garman, 1888)

Synonyms
- Phyllobates trinitatis Garman, 1888 "1887"; Colostethus trinitatus (Garman, 1888)

= Mannophryne trinitatis =

Species of amphibian

The yellow-throated frog, Trinidadian stream frog, or Trinidad poison frog (Mannophryne trinitatis) is a diurnal species of frog in the family Aromobatidae that is endemic to the island of Trinidad in the Republic of Trinidad and Tobago. Trinidad poison frogs can be found in rocky streams in moist montane forests. The species has cryptic coloration and is sexually dimorphic. Mannophryne venezuelensis from the Paria Peninsula in Venezuela were also formerly included in this species. Currently this species is listed as of "Least Concern" on IUCN, but there is a general lack of understanding of its distribution. The frog experiences habitat loss. Both sexes are territorial and provide parental care together.

== Description ==
Adult Trinidad poison frogs are a relatively small and diurnal species. Their dorsal surface is brown and dark and their flanks are mottled. The Trinidad poison frog is sexually dimorphic. Adult males have grey throats and average 25 mm in snout-vent length. Females have bright yellow throats and average 28 mm. Adult males can also change their skin color from pale brown to jet black when they engage in mate-calling to attract females. Tadpoles, in contrast, start around 14 mm to 16 mm in length and later grow to around 37 mm after metamorphosing.

The Trinidad poison frog has a well-defined and solid pigmented collar and a solid brown dorsum. It has well defined pale dorsolateral stripes and dark pigmentation around the external margin of its soles and palms. It also has a well-defined pale inguinal stripe, bandlike concentrations of melanophores along the anterior arms, and dark pigmentation on the metatarsal and subarticular tubercles of its toes.

== Habitat and distribution ==
The Trinidad poison frog is only found in the Paria Peninsula of Northern Venezuela and the Northern and Central Ranges of Trinidad, West Indies. The frog can live anywhere ranging from sea level to extremely high elevations and prefers to reside around rocky streams in valleys, mountain slopes, or undisturbed moist montane forests. The streams are typically narrow and shallow with slow, clear running waters and contain deeper pools where frogs can deposit and develop their tadpoles. Frogs will sometimes transport their tadpoles from these streams to live in other pools such as phytotelmata if a large number of predators exist nearby.

== Conservation ==
The Trinidad poison frog is currently listed on the IUCN Red List as "least concern", and is not present on the CITES Endangered Species List. However, a significant number of frogs have suffered regional habitat loss and degradation through pollution, deforestation, and shifting cultivation. Additionally, populations of the frog may be disappearing before they can be recorded due to a lack of population genetics analyses. One study from Venezuela, proposed direct conservation measures include forest preservation and strict regulations on agrochemical products used on coffee and cocoa plantations near streams.

== Home range and territoriality ==
Trinidad poison frogs engage in two types of territorial defense. The first involves nonreproductive regions where frogs will defend resource access to food, water, and shelter. The second involves large reproductive regions where frogs will defend against conspecific calling rivals during the breeding season. Adult females engage in territorial defense more often than males.

Adult female Trinidad poison frogs display territorial defense against other frogs through aggressive behaviors such as visual threat displays, wrestling, and chasing. During threat displays, females will reveal their bright yellow throats against intruders.

Adult males, in contrast, defend their territories against both predators and other male intruders by producing advertisement calls at their calling sites. Such defense is intended to deter competitors and attract females as potential mates.

== Diet ==
Adult Trinidad poison frogs often feed on arthropods and small insects such as Drosophila (D. hydei and D. melanogaster) and Callosobruchus chinensis. In contrast, tadpoles are usually herbivorous and feed on algae and leaf litter. Frogs and tadpoles also consume bat guano and invertebrate infauna as food.

== Reproduction and mating ==
Reproductive characteristics such as intraovarian clutch size and tadpole size for Trinidad poison frogs differ according to the frog's biogeography. In Trinidad, clutch size ranged from 6 in to 13 in from the Northern Range and 12 in to 26 in from the Tamana cave of the Central Range hills.

Adult males court females from a distance by producing advertisement calls. Additionally, they engage in throat display and toe tip jumping. As they vocalize, their skin color changes from pale brown to jet black. When a nearby female receives a male's call signal or notices its skin coloration, the female will leave its territory and approach the calling male to engage in amplexus. The pair then moves to oviposition sites such as rock crevices or wet leaves near streams.

== Parental care ==
Adult female Trinidad poison frogs lay their eggs near streams following increased humidity from rainfall.

Adult males then guard and tend to the eggs until they hatch after about 21 days. When predation risk is high, males will transport their tadpoles on their backs for long distances between 3 and 4 days and selectively deposit them into predator free pools. Such tadpole transportation does not incur significant costs on adult males in terms of reduced feeding. Males are unable to breed with females while transporting tadpoles.

== Enemies ==
The Trinidad poison frog and its tadpoles are commonly preyed on by a killifish species (Anablepsoides hartii) and shrimp of the genus Macrobrachium. The frog species also suffers from various intestinal parasites, or helminths, such as cestodes, nematodes, and acanthocephalans.
