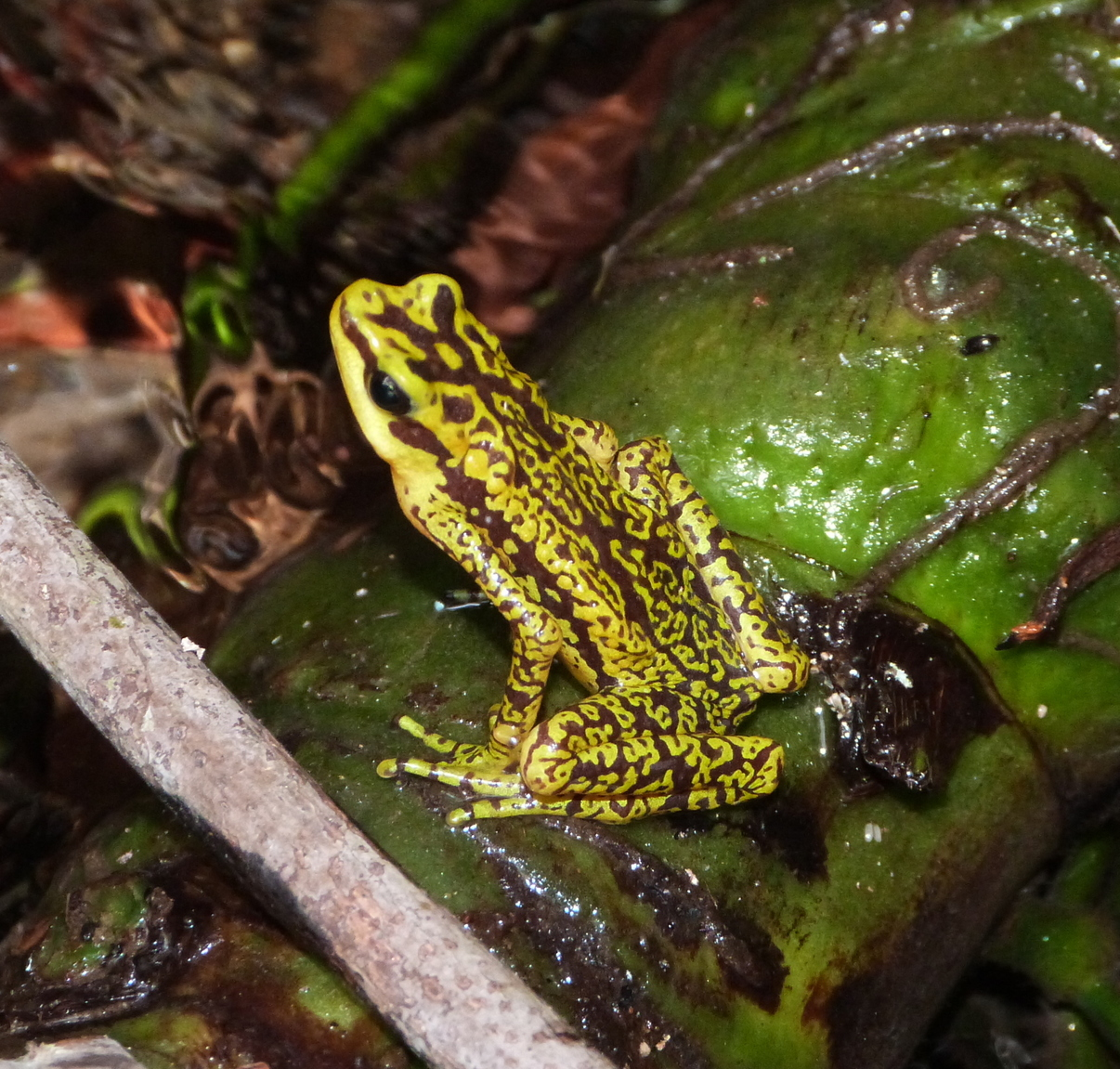

Conservation status
- Critically Endangered (IUCN 3.1)

Scientific classification
- Kingdom: Animalia
- Phylum: Chordata
- Class: Amphibia
- Order: Anura
- Family: Bufonidae
- Genus: Atelopus
- Species: A. cruciger

Binomial name
- Atelopus cruciger (Lichtenstein and Martens, 1856)

Synonyms
- Phrynidium crucigerum Lichtenstein and Martens, 1856

= Atelopus cruciger =

Species of amphibian

Atelopus cruciger, also known as the Veragua stubfoot toad or Rancho Grande harlequin frog, is a species of toad in the family Bufonidae. It is endemic to Venezuela and is mainly found in the central Venezuelan Coastal Range. Despite considerable effort, no specimens of Atelopus cruciger could be found for seventeen years after 1986. The species was believed extinct until, in 2003, researchers found a small population at the Cordillera de La Costa. A few other locations were later discovered. Atelopus cruciger is mainly threatened by chytridiomycosis. It is locally called sapito rayado.

== Description ==
Adult males measure 28–35 mm (1.1–1.4 in) and adult females 40–50 mm (1.6–2.0 in) in snout–vent length. The body is slender. The snout is pointed in dorsal view. No tympanum is visible, but the supratympanic crest is well developed. There are small rounded warts present on the dorsolateral surfaces, most prominently around the arm insertions and as a dorsolateral row. The fingers have basal webbing while the toes are slightly more webbed. The hind limbs are relatively long. Preserved specimens have greenish tan color that is lighter on the ventral side. The dorsal surfaces have dense brown vermiculation as well as a X-pattern behind the head.

== Diet ==
The main sources of food for these frogs are ants and other small insects.

== Habitat and conservation ==
Atelopus cruciger was historically abundant and widely spread in the Venezuelan Coastal Range at elevations up to 2,400 m (7,900 ft) above sea level, although most records were from gallery, cloud, and semi-deciduous forests at 500–2,000 m (1,600–6,600 ft) above sea level. Atelopus cruciger usually occurs near streams and rivulets. These frogs are diurnal and often found on stones, but can also climb to vegetation up to 1.5 meters above the ground. Breeding takes place along swift-flowing streams.

However, the species has undergone a dramatic decline, and only few populations are known to persist. These are all at low altitudes (220–500 m (720–1,640 ft)) on the northern slope of the Henri Pittier National Park. The main reason for the decline is believed to be chytridiomycosis. Many of the historic collections came from protected areas. Air pollution (acid rain) could also be a contributing factor, given the proximity to the industries in the Valencia-Maracay area.

== In culture ==
- The frog appears on the reverse side of the Venezuelan Bs.S 5 banknote.
