= Hueque River =

- Mouth location in Venezuela

Location
- Country: Venezuela

Physical characteristics
- Mouth
  - location: Caribbean Sea
  - coordinates: 11°26′15″N 68°58′04″W

Hueque River is a river of northern Venezuela. It flows into the Caribbean Sea.

The river drains part of the Lara-Falcón dry forests ecoregion.

== See also ==
- List of rivers of Venezuela
