= Mannophryne yustizi =

Conservation status
- Endangered (IUCN 3.1)

Scientific classification
- Kingdom: Animalia
- Phylum: Chordata
- Class: Amphibia
- Order: Anura
- Family: Aromobatidae
- Genus: Mannophryne
- Species: M. yustizi

Binomial name
- Mannophryne yustizi (La Marca, 1989)

Species of frog

Mannophryne yustizi is a species of frog in the family Aromobatidae. It is endemic to Venezuela.

== Habitat ==
This frog lives near streams in cloud forests and other forest types on mountains. Scientists observed the frog between 1200 and 1800 meters above sea level.

Scientists found the frog two protected parks, Yacambú National Park and Terepaima National Park, though it has also been seen elsewhere.

== Reproduction ==
The female frogs lay eggs on land. After the eggs hatch, the male frogs carry the tadpoles to water.

== Threats ==
The IUCN classifies this species as endangered. In parts of its range, it is subject to habitat loss in favor of livestock cultivation and coffee plantations. Agrochemicals can also affect this frog.
