= Península de Paria National Park =

National park in Venezuela

Península de Paria National Park Parque Nacional Península de Paria
- IUCN category II (national park)
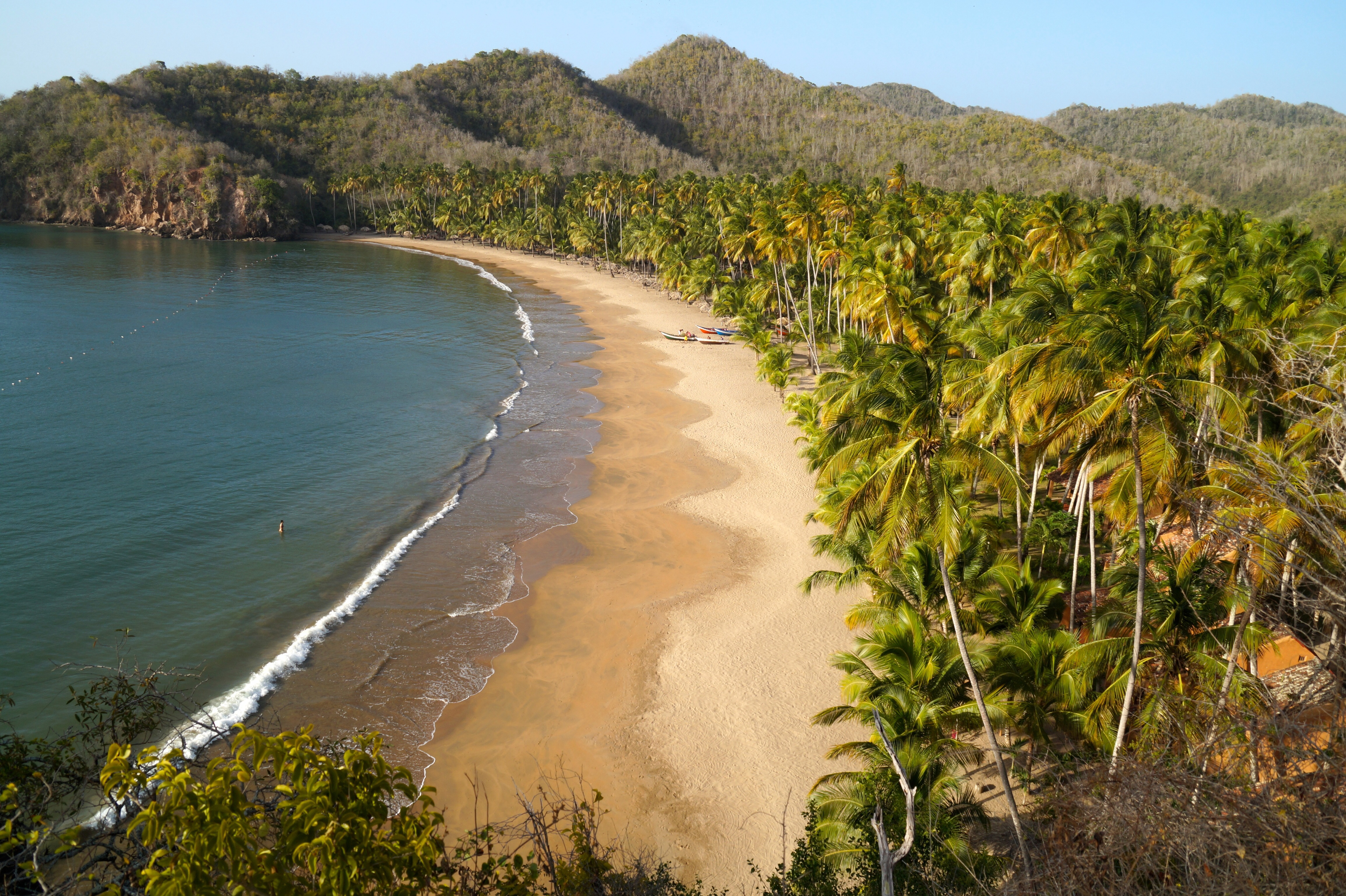

- Location within Venezuela
- Location: Venezuela
- Coordinates: 10°42′N 62°30′W
- Area: 375 km^{2} (145 sq mi)
- Established: December 12, 1978

The Península de Paria National Park (Spanish: Parque nacional Península de Paria), or Peninsula of Paria National Park, is a national park on Paria Peninsula in Venezuela.

== Geography ==
The park is located between the Gulf of Paria and the Caribbean Sea in eastern Sucre state, within the districts of Arismendi, Mariño, and Valdez. It was declared as such by December 12, 1978, published in Official Gazette No. 2417 of March 7, 1979. The park was established to protect the unique peninsula section of the Venezuelan Coastal Range, whose flora and fauna are characteristic of the Venezuelan Guiana.

The main rivers with headwaters in the range within the park are the Macuro, Yacua, Río Oscuro, Río Grande, El Mapire, and Ceiba. All flow into the Gulf of Paria south of the park and peninsula.

== Recreation ==
Península de Paria National Park is open to hiking and outdoor recreation, and includes both coastal and mountainous landscapes in which the highest areas of the peninsula are registered: Cerro El Patao (1070 masl) and Cerro Humo (1371 masl).

== Gallery ==
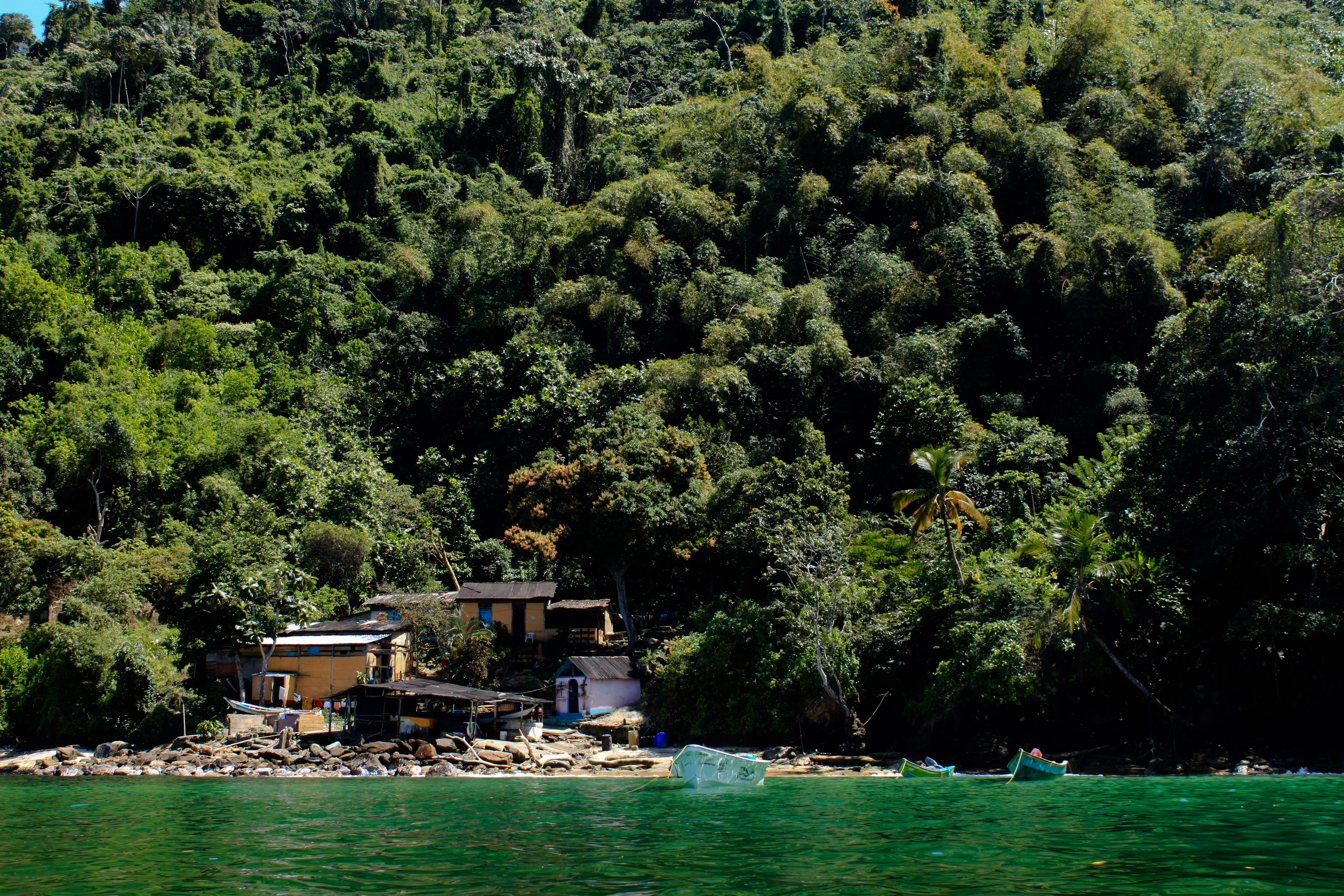

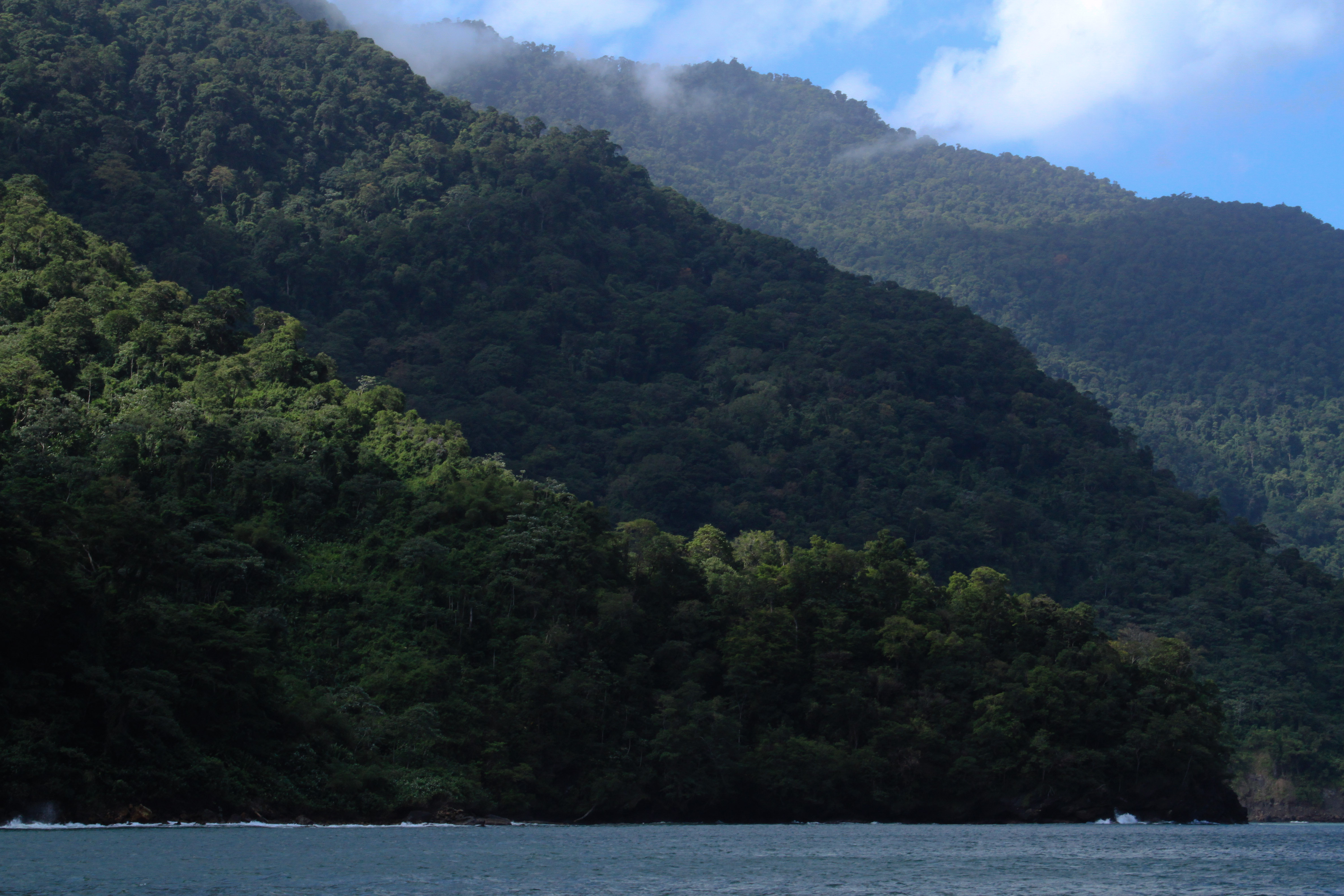

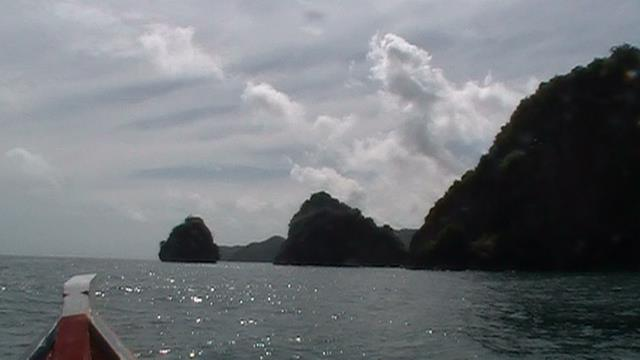

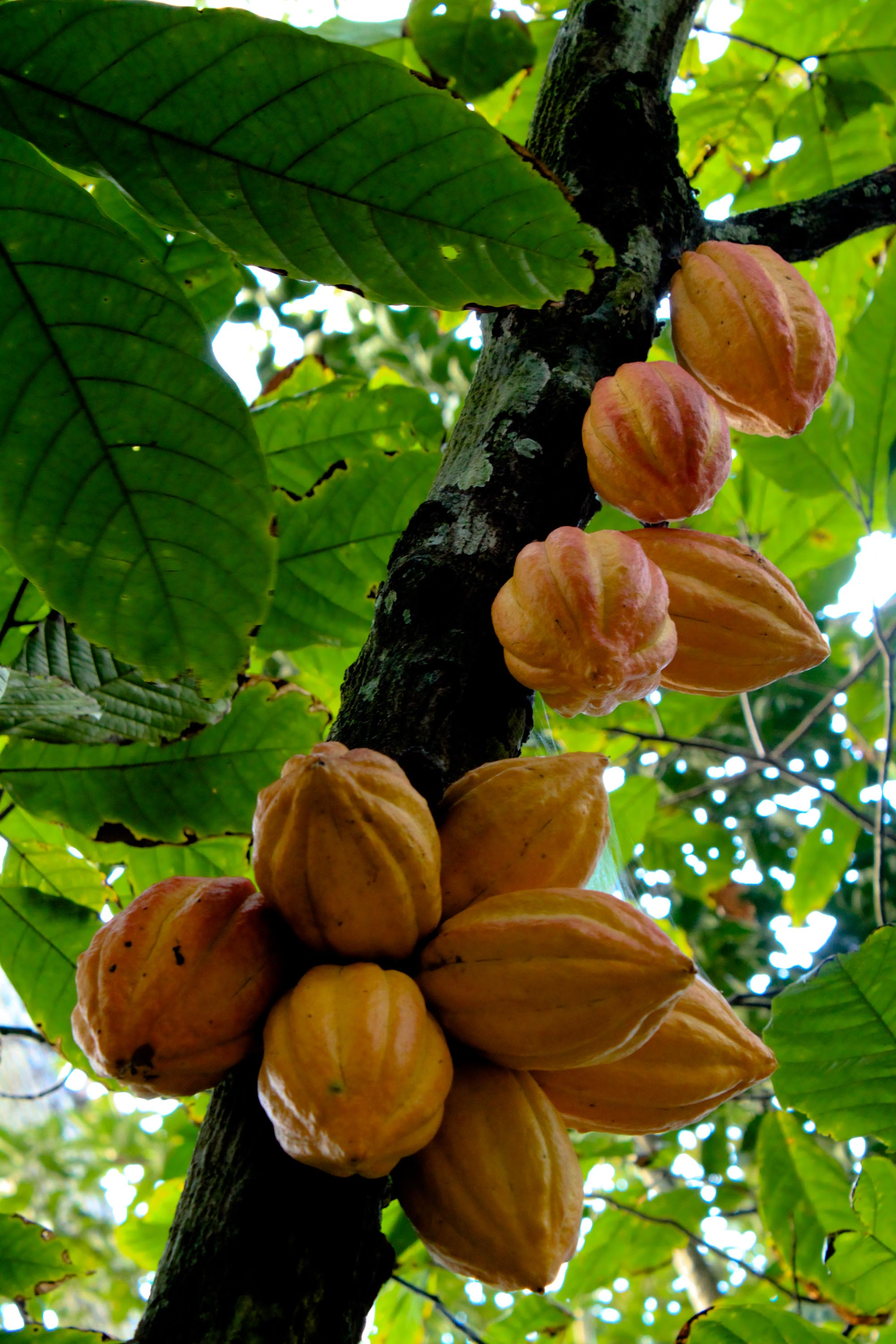

== See also ==
- Gulf of Paria topics
- List of national parks of Venezuela
- Canaima National Park
