= Pristimantis turumiquirensis =

Conservation status
- Critically Endangered (IUCN 3.1)

Scientific classification
- Kingdom: Animalia
- Phylum: Chordata
- Class: Amphibia
- Order: Anura
- Clade: Brachycephaloidea
- Family: Craugastoridae
- Genus: Pristimantis
- Species: P. turumiquirensis

Binomial name
- Pristimantis turumiquirensis (Rivero, 1961)

Synonyms
- Eleutherodactylus turumiquirensis Rivero, 1961

Species of frog

Pristimantis turumiquirensis is a species of frog in the family Strabomantidae. It is endemic to Venezuela. Its natural habitats are tropical moist montane forests and caves. It is threatened by habitat loss.
