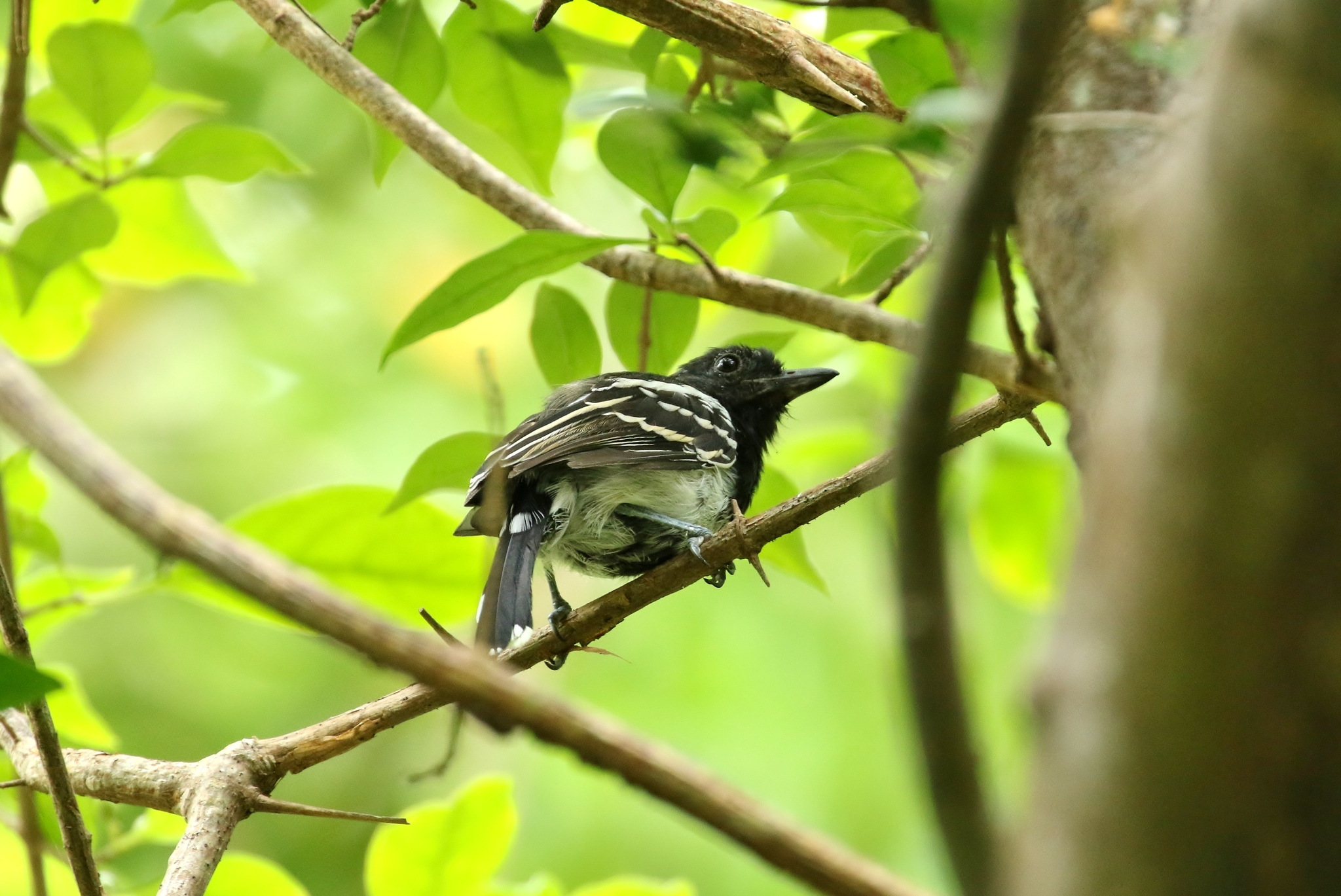
- A black-backed antshrike in Colombia on 13 January 2019

Conservation status
- Least Concern (IUCN 3.1)

Scientific classification
- Kingdom: Animalia
- Phylum: Chordata
- Class: Aves
- Order: Passeriformes
- Family: Thamnophilidae
- Genus: Thamnophilus
- Species: T. melanonotus

Binomial name
- Thamnophilus melanonotus Sclater, PL, 1855

Synonyms
- Sakesphorus melanonotus

= Black-backed antshrike =

Species of bird

The black-backed antshrike (Thamnophilus melanonotus) is a species of bird in subfamily Thamnophilinae of family Thamnophilidae, the "typical antbirds". It is found in Colombia and Venezuela.

== Taxonomy and systematics ==
The black-backed antshrike was described by the English zoologist Philip Sclater in 1855 and given the binomial name Thamnophilus melanonotus. It was subsequently placed in the genus Sakesphorus. A molecular phylogenetic study published in 2007 found that Sakesphorus was polyphyletic and that three species including the black-backed antshrike were embedded within a clade containing members of Thamnophilus. The black-backed antshrike was therefore moved back to its original genus.

The black-backed antshrike is monotypic.

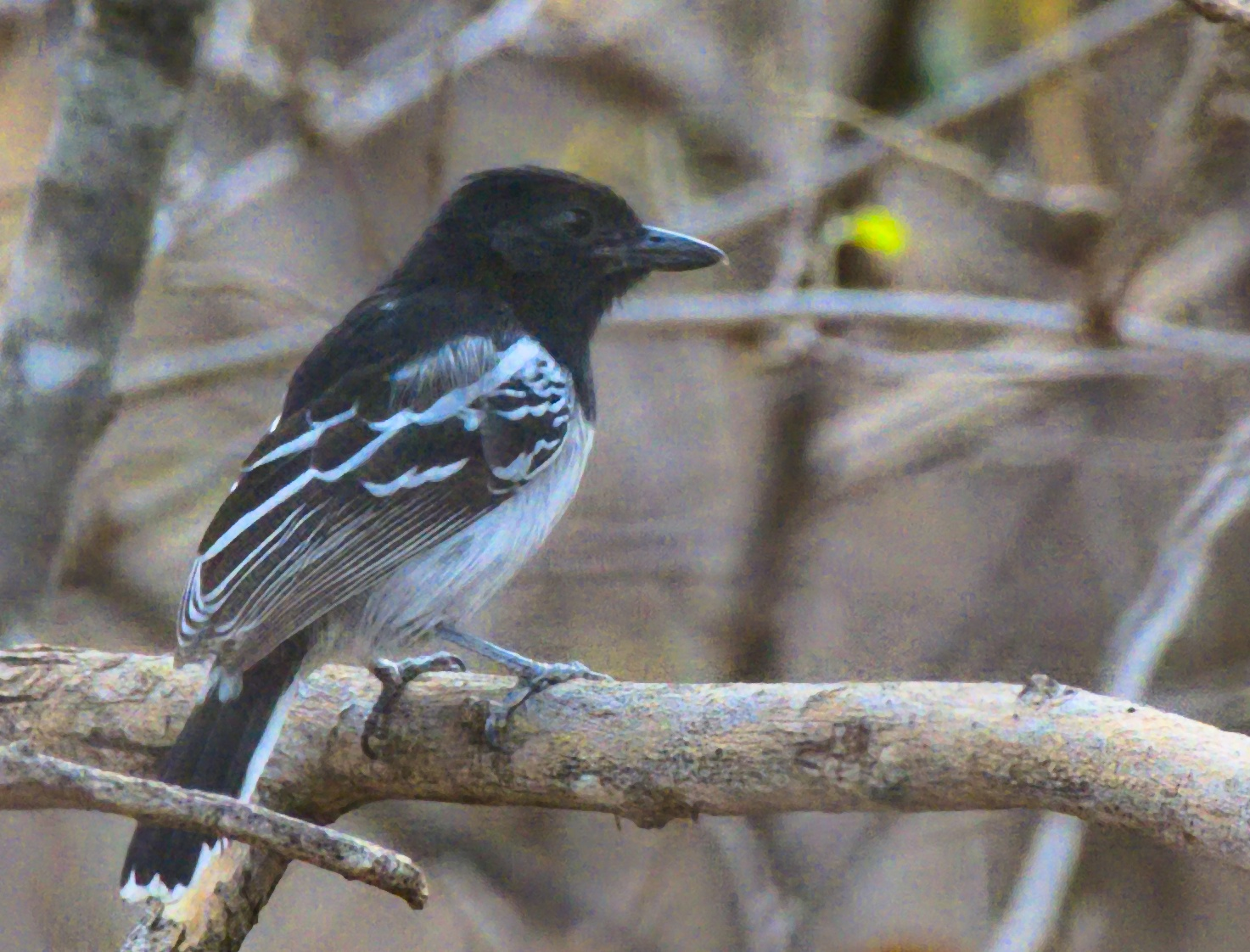
Black-backed antshrike

== Description ==
The black-backed antshrike is 15 to 16 cm (5.9 to 6.3 in) long. Members of genus Thamnophilus are largish members of the antbird family; all have stout bills with a hook like those of true shrikes. Adult males have a black to blackish brown head and back with white edges on the scapulars and a hidden white patch between them. Their lower back and rump are light gray. Their wings are black with wide white tips on the coverts and white edges on the flight feathers. Their tail is black with white tips on the feathers and white edges on the outermost pair. Their throat and breast are black and their flanks, belly, and crissum are white. Adult females have a dark brown crown with cinnamon edges to the feathers. Their face is buff. Their upperparts are brown with dark centers to the feathers. Their wings and wing coverts are brownish black with pale buff edges and tips. Their tail is rufous-brown with whitish tips and edges to the feathers. Their underparts are buff that is somewhat whiter on the belly. Subadult males resemble adult females with some black feathers beginning to show.

== Distribution and habitat ==
The black-backed antshrike has a disjunct distribution. It is found on the Caribbean slope from northern Colombia as far south as northern Bolívar Department and east into northwestern Venezuela as far as Miranda state. A second population is found in the Zulia River valley in Colombia's Norte de Santander Department and the adjacent Cordillera de Mérida in western Venezuela. The species inhabits the understorey to mid-storey of dry deciduous forest, where it favors areas with dense vine thickets. In elevation it ranges from sea level to 1,000 m (3,300 ft) in Colombia and to 1,300 m (4,300 ft) in Venezuela, though in the latter country it is mostly found below 500 m (1,600 ft).

== Behavior ==
=== Movement ===
The black-backed antshrike is thought to be a year-round resident throughout its range.

=== Feeding ===
The black-backed antshrike's diet is primarily insects and probably also includes other small arthropods. It forages rather lethargically, mostly singly or in pairs and seldom as part of a mixed-species feeding flock. It forages mostly on and near the ground up to about 6 m (20 ft) above it, and especially in vine tangles. It feeds by gleaning, with short upward jumps, and by pouncing to the ground. It occasionally follows army ant swarms.

=== Breeding ===
The black-backed antshrike breeds between March and July in northern Colombia; its season in Venezuela is not known. Its one known nest was an open cup suspended in a branch fork; it contained two eggs. The incubation period, time to fledging, and details of parental care are not known.

=== Vocalization ===
The black-backed antshrike apparently has two songs, "a single soft cuua [and] a short, nasal roll, qurrrrrr". Its other vocalizations include "a short nasal caaa-aa, a nasal grunting, rolled gur'r'a, and soft nasal ca-hunk?".

== Status ==
The IUCN has assessed the black-backed antshrike as being of Least Concern. It has a large range; its population size is not known and is believed to be decreasing. No immediate threats have been identified. It is considered uncommon in Colombia and uncommon and local in Venezuela. It occurs in one protected area in Venezuela. "Conversion of much of the dry and semi-deciduous forest of the region to agriculture (particularly pasture for goats) is a potential threat that needs to be monitored."
