= Venezuelan Coastal Range =

Mountain range in Venezuela

Venezuelan Coastal Range Caribbean Mountain System Maritime Andes
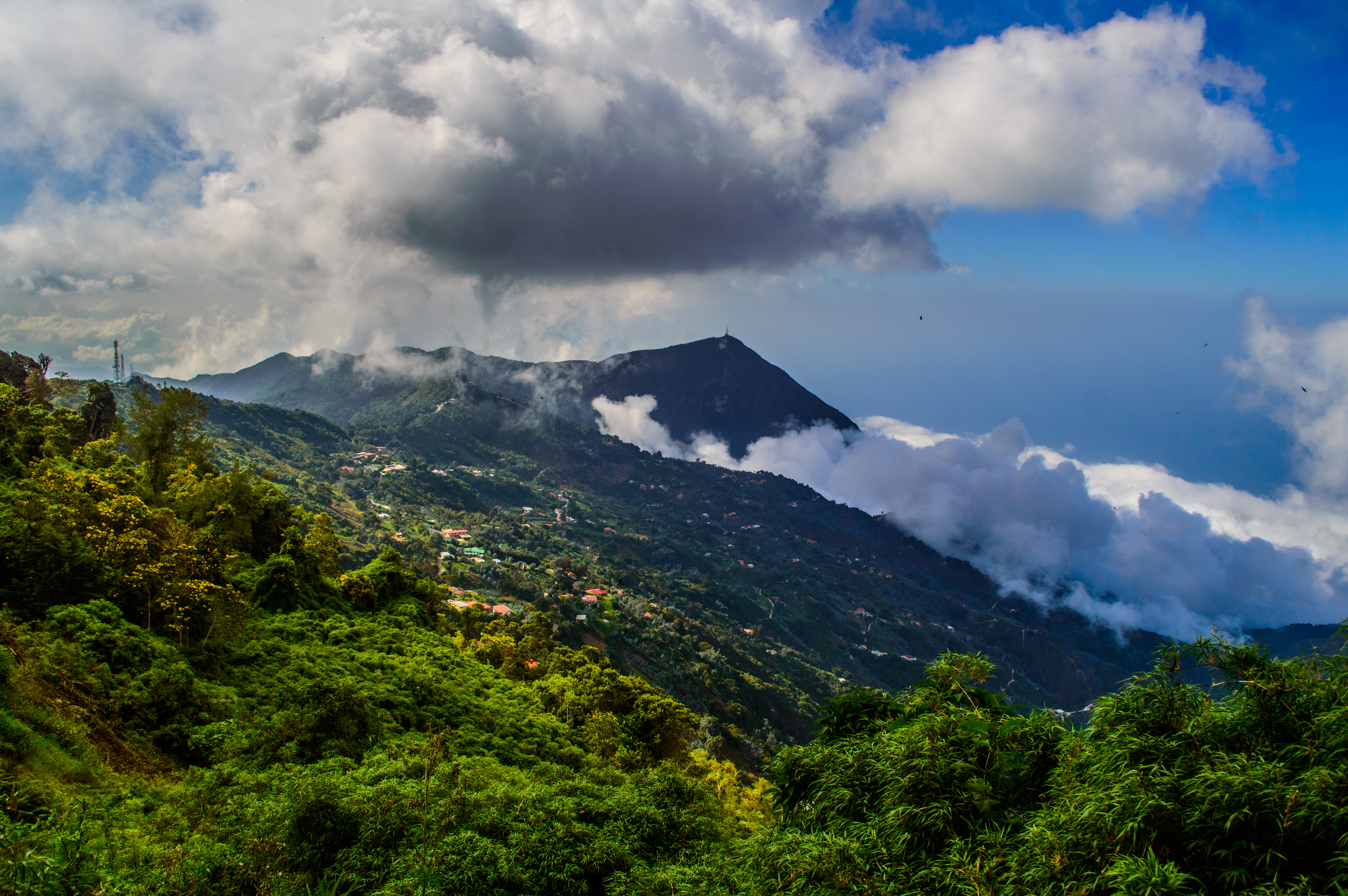
- A view of Venezuelan Coastal Range from Galipán

Highest point
- Peak: Pico Naiguatá
- Elevation: 2,765 m (9,072 ft)
- Coordinates: 10°32′36″N 66°46′57″W

Geography
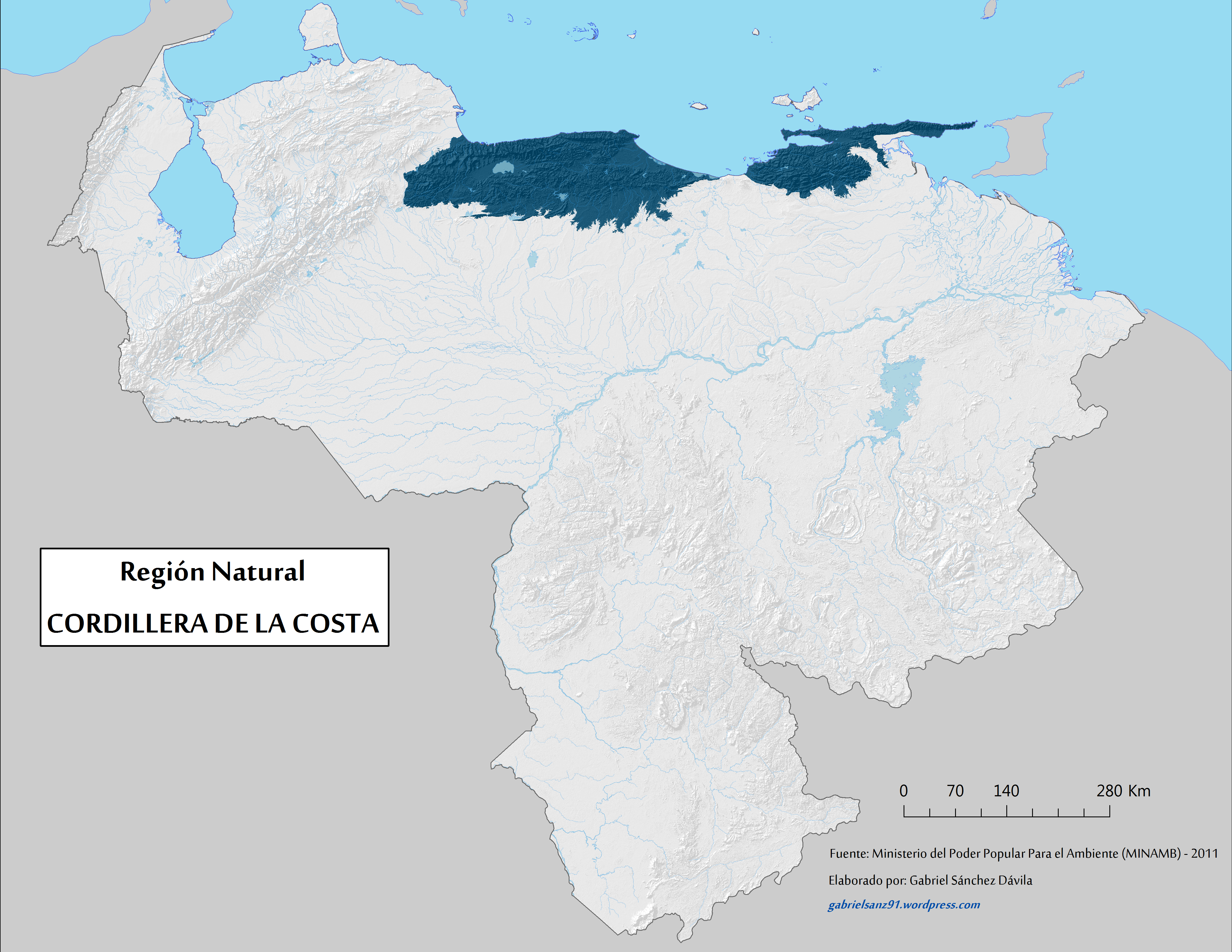
- Geographic map of the Venezuelan Coastal Range natural region.
- Location: Central North Venezuela

The Venezuelan Coastal Range (Spanish: Cordillera de la Costa or Serranía de la Costa), also known as Venezuelan Caribbean Mountain System (Spanish: Sistema Montañoso Caribe), is a mountain range system and one of the eight natural regions of Venezuela, that runs along the central and eastern portions of Venezuela's northern coast. The range is a northeastern extension of the Andes, and is also known as the Maritime Andes. It covers around 48,866 km^{2}, being the 4th largest natural region in Venezuela.

== Geography ==
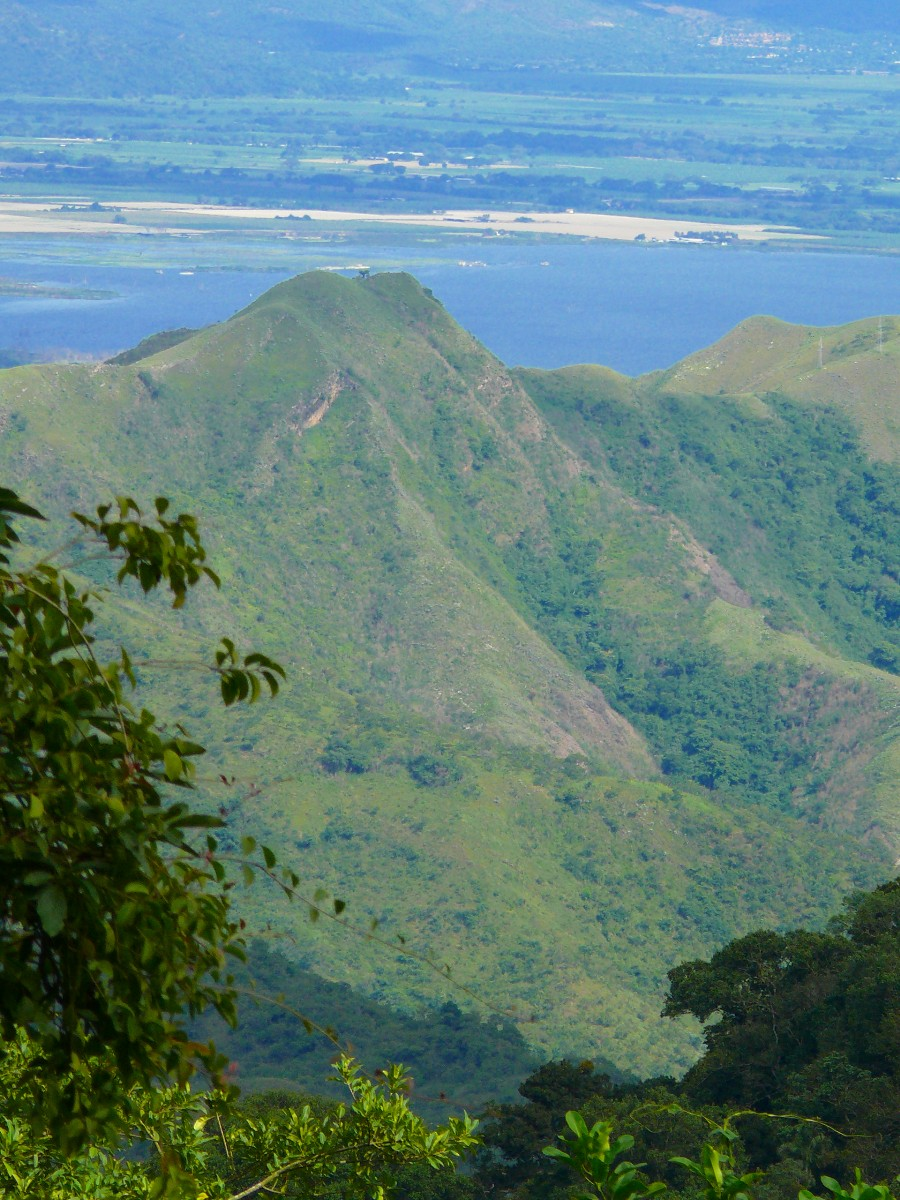
Coastal Range of Venezuelan Andes from biological station Rancho Grande

The Coastal Range consists of two parallel ranges, which run east and west along the coast of the Caribbean Sea. The Cojedes River separates the western end of the Coastal Range from the Cordillera de Mérida to the southeast. The range is divided into eastern and western sections by the wide bay between Cape Codera and Cumaná.

=== Serranía del Litoral—Serranía del Interior ===
In the western section of the range, the parallel ranges are known as the Serranía del Litoral, which runs along the Caribbean coast, and the Serranía del Interior to the south. The valley between these two ranges, which includes Lake Valencia, the valleys of metropolitan Caracas, and the Tuy River at its eastern end, is the most densely populated region of Venezuela.

The Capital District lies in a valley between two branches of the Serranía del Litoral: with Cerro El Ávila (peak) and El Ávila National Park in the Cordillera de la Costa Central to the north, and smaller hills to the south.

Both the Littoral and Interior ranges reappear between Cumaná and the Gulf of Paria to form the eastern section of the Venezuelan Coastal Range. The Littoral range forms the Araya Peninsula to the west and the Paria Peninsula to the east, and extends across the straits known as the Dragon's Mouths to form the Northern Range of the island of Trinidad.

== Ecoregions ==
The lower elevations of the mountains are mostly covered by the La Costa xeric shrublands ecoregion of the deserts and xeric shrublands biome. The Araya and Paria xeric scrub occupies the arid zones of the Araya and Paria peninsulas, except the montane areas of the Paria Peninsula, which are included in the La Costa xeric shrublands ecoregion. The Araya and Paria xeric scrub also includes Isla Margarita and extends south onto the mainland to Cumaná.

At elevations from 600–2,675 metres (1,969–8,776 ft) lie the humid evergreen Cordillera de la Costa montane forests ecoregion of the montane tropical and subtropical moist broadleaf forests biome, which form eleven discontinuous enclaves across the high summits of the eastern and western portions of the range.
