= Venezuelan Fauna Red List =

Venezuelan scientific organization

The Red List of Venezuelan Fauna
- Region served: Venezuela
- Official language: Spanish

The Red List of Venezuelan Fauna, Venezuelan Fauna Red List, or Listo Rojo de la Fauna Venezolana is a scientific organization that studies animal populations within Venezuela and determines their level of risk of extinction. The List permits citizen scientists to contribute information.

== Origins ==
The Red List of Venezuelan Fauna began as the Red Book of Venezuelan Fauna, which was first release din 1995 and re-released in 1999 and 2003. At first, the organization attempted to distribute information by providing universities with books, but it later made the switch to electronic means.

The Red List first allowed non-professionals to join its website in 2013. At that time, 81 scientists, 11 photographers, and 20 artists had already reviewed more than 4000 species.

== Updates ==
Unlike other conservation lists, which are updated every few years, contributors can post new information to the Venezuelan Fauna Red List at any time. The List has three main editors who oversee the entire program and eighteen other editors who specialize in smaller groups of fauna and monitor new contributions within their areas of expertise.
