= Allobates pittieri =

Conservation status
- Least Concern (IUCN 3.1)

Scientific classification
- Kingdom: Animalia
- Phylum: Chordata
- Class: Amphibia
- Order: Anura
- Family: Aromobatidae
- Genus: Allobates
- Species: A. pittieri

Binomial name
- Allobates pittieri (La Marca, Manzanilla, and Mijares-Urrutia, 2004)

Synonyms
- Colestethus pittieri La Marca, Manzanilla, and Mijares-Urrutia, 2004

Species of frog

Allobates pittieri is a species of frog in the family Aromobatidae. It is endemic to northern Venezuela where it is known from the Venezuelan Coastal Range and northeastern part of the Cordillera de Mérida. Its type locality is in the Henri Pittier National Park.

== Habitat ==
This terrestrial, diurnal frog is found on the forest floor. It is usually found near permanent or intermittent streams but can venture far from them. The frogs' principal diet includes ants. Scientists have observed the frog between 115 and 1700 meters above sea level.

The frog's known range includes at least six protected parks: Juan Crisóstomo Falcón National Park, Morrocoy National Park, San Esteban National Park, Henri Pittier National Park, Yacambú National Park, and Guáquira Ecological Reserve. Scientists think it could live in Terepaima National Park, Tirgua National Park and Yasuni National Park too.

== Reproduction ==
After the eggs hatch, the adult male frog carries the tadpoles to water.

== Threats ==
The IUCN classifies this frog as least concern of extinction, though it does face some threats in parts of its range, principally habitat loss in favor of agriculture and tourism but also fires and pollution.

Scientists consider the fungal disease chytridiomycosis a possible threat. Some specimens have tested positive for the causitive pathogen, Batrachochytrium dendrobatidis.

== Original description ==
- La Marca, E.; Manzanilla, J.; Mijares-Urrutia, A. (2004). "Revision taxonomica del Colostethus del norte de Venezuela confundido durante largo tiempo con C. brunneus". Herpetotropicos: 40–50.
