= Allobates algorei =

Conservation status
- Near Threatened (IUCN 3.1)

Scientific classification
- Kingdom: Animalia
- Phylum: Chordata
- Class: Amphibia
- Order: Anura
- Family: Aromobatidae
- Genus: Allobates
- Species: A. algorei

Binomial name
- Allobates algorei Barrio-Amorós and Santos, 2009

Species of frog

Allobates algorei, the spotted nurse frog, is a species of frog in the family Aromobatidae. It is endemic to Venezuela and Colombia.

== Habitat ==
This diurnal, terrestrial frog lives in riparian primary forest habitats. It has shown some tolerance to habitat disturbance. Scientists have observed the frog between 400 and 1185 meters above sea level.

The frog's range includes some protected parks in, for example Páramos de Batallón y La Negra National Park, Chorro El Índio National Park, and El Tamá National Park in Venezuela and Tamá National Natural Park in Colombia. However, an 150-hour survey of Tamá National Natural Park did not result in any reports of A. algorei frogs there.

== Reproduction ==
Male frogs hide in the dead leaves on the ground, under rocks, or in dense vegetation and call to the female frogs. Scientists infer that the female frog lays eggs on land and that, after the eggs hatch, the male frog carries the tadpoles to water, as in other species in this genus.

== Threats ==
Venezuela's Fauna Red List classifies this frog as least concern of extinction and the IUCN Red List classifies this frog as near threatened. Its principal threat is habitat loss in favor of small-scale agriculture. The frog faces pollution from agrochemicals and loss of stream habitat from irrigation. Scientists also detected the fungus Batrachochytrium dendrobatidis on some of specimens, but they did not see any signs of the fatal disease chytridiomycosis.

== Original publication ==
- Barrio-Amoros CL; Santos JC (2009). "Description of a new Allobates (Anura, Dendrobatidae) from the eastern Andean piedmont, Venezuela". Phyllomedusa. 8: 89–104.
