= El Guache National Park =

National park in Venezuela

El Guache National Park Parque nacional El Guache
- IUCN category II (national park)
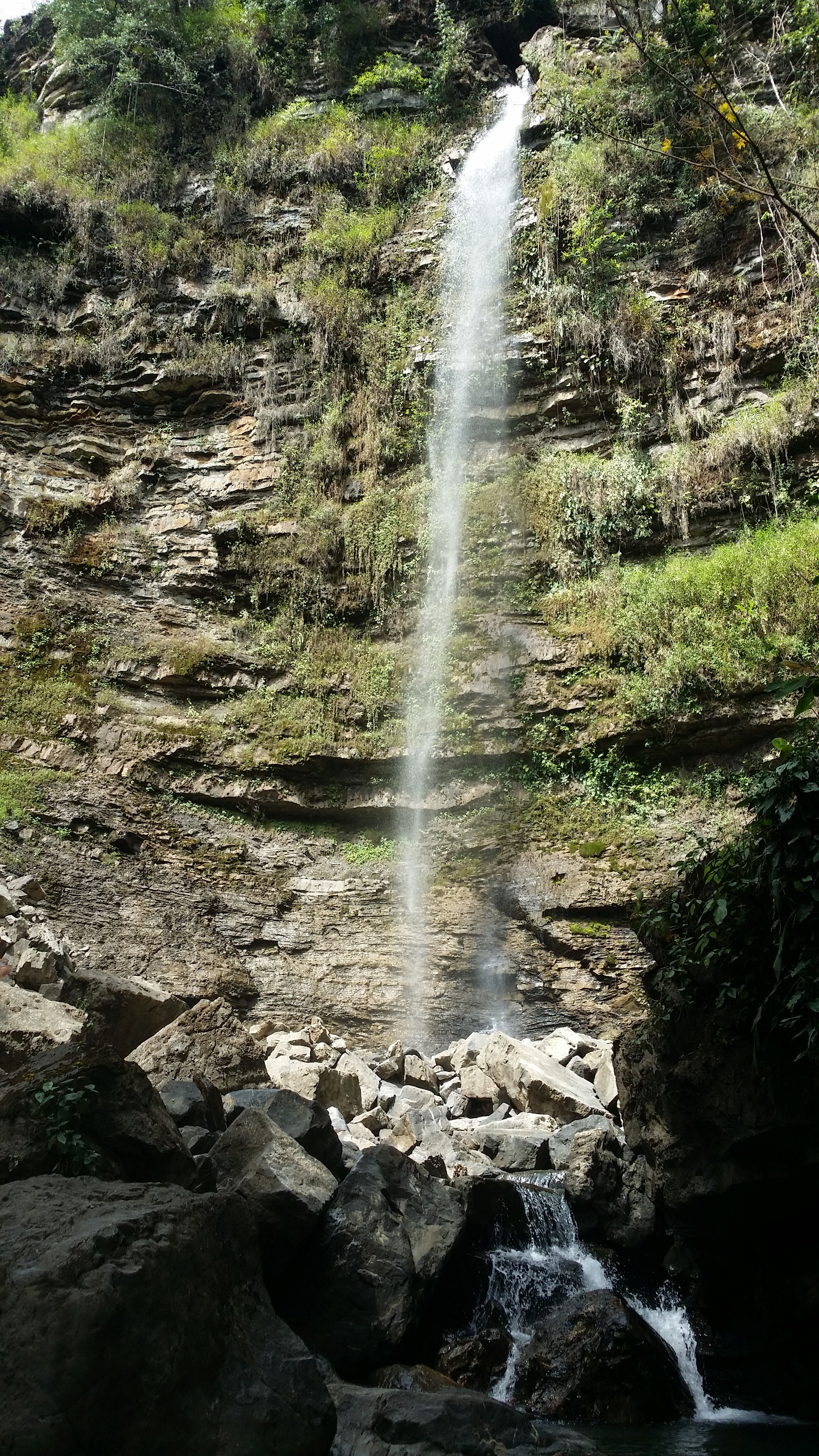

- Location within Venezuela
- Location: Venezuela
- Coordinates: 9°34′N 69°33′W
- Area: 122 km^{2} (47 sq mi)
- Established: June 5, 1992

The El Guache National Park (Spanish: Parque nacional El Guache) Is a protected area with the status of national park in Venezuela, located at the beginning of the Andes mountain range, comprising mountainous parts of the Lara and Portuguesa states, and the birth of the Guache, Ospino, Toco, Morador and Are rivers. 2 In its adjacencies is the mighty waterfall San Miguel. It has an area of 12,200 ha traditionally measured and 15,960 Ha. Its temperature is between 19 °C. and 26 °C. Precipitation varies between 1800 and 2000 mm annually.

It was decreed National Park on June 5, 1992, in order to protect the high basins of the Guache, Ospino, Bocoy, Toco and Are rivers.

== See also ==
- List of national parks of Venezuela
- Los Roques National Park
