= Macarao National Park =

Protected area of Venezuela

Macarao National Park Parque Nacional Macarao
- IUCN category II (national park)
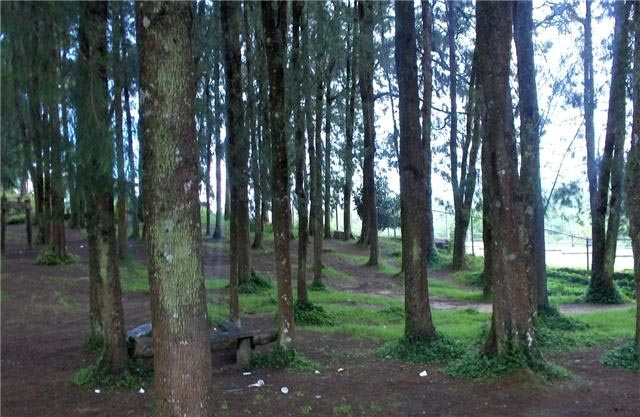

- Location within Venezuela
- Location: Venezuela
- Coordinates: 10°25′N 67°01′W
- Area: 150 km^{2} (58 sq mi)
- Established: December 5, 1973

The Macarao National Park (Spanish: Parque nacional Macarao) Is a protected area with the status of a national park located in the Macarao, San Pedro and Jarillo rivers, in the north of the South American country of Venezuela. Its extension of 15,000 hectares covers part of the Capital District and Miranda State. The area was declared National Park in 1973.

It constitutes a zone of protection of hydrographic resources that contributes to satisfy the drinking water needs of the city of Caracas.

It is characterized by a mountainous relief that forms part of the Cordillera de la Costa, the highest point of which is the Alto de Ño León. It has facilities to facilitate sports, scientific and educational excursions.

== Gallery ==
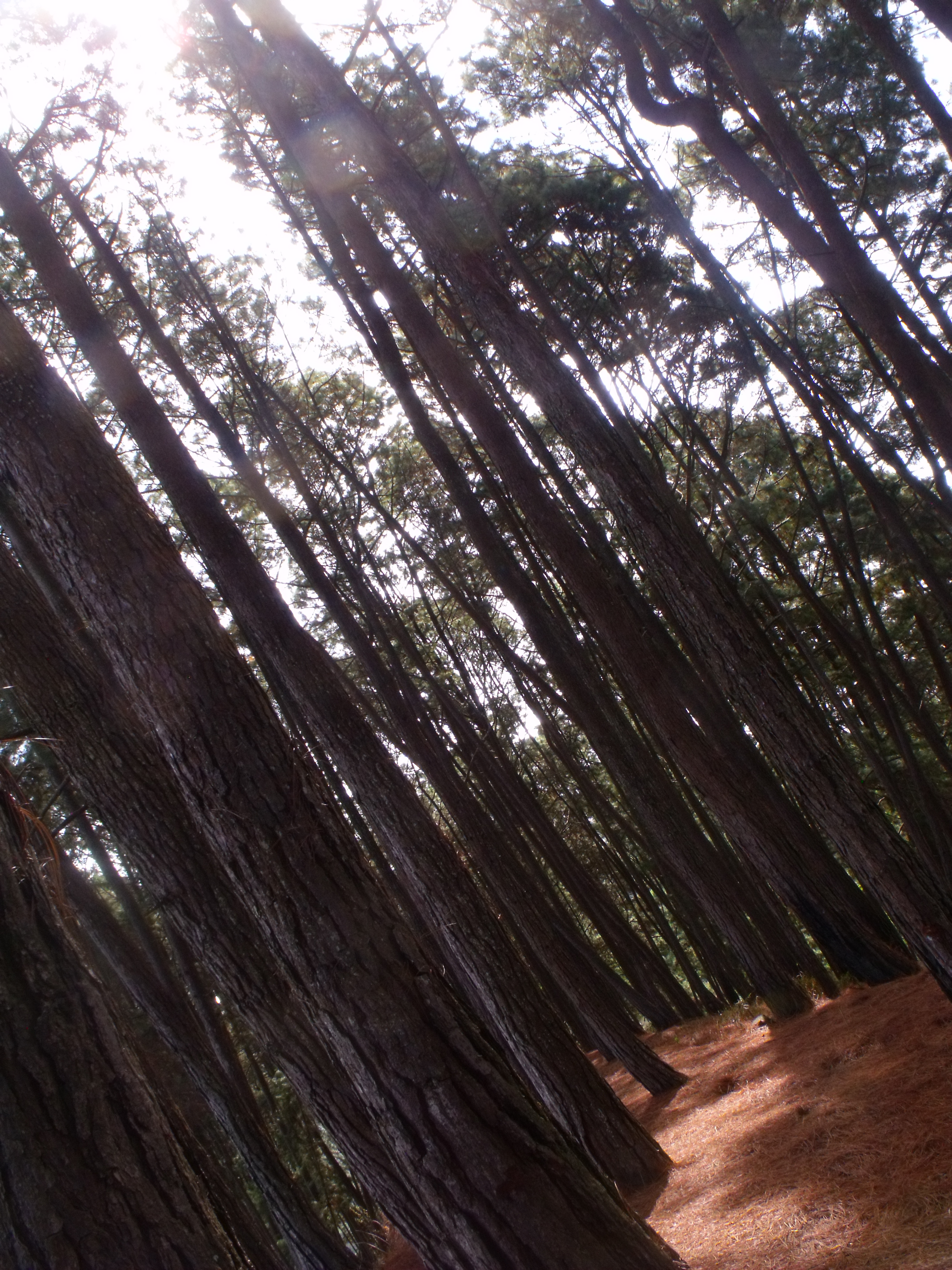

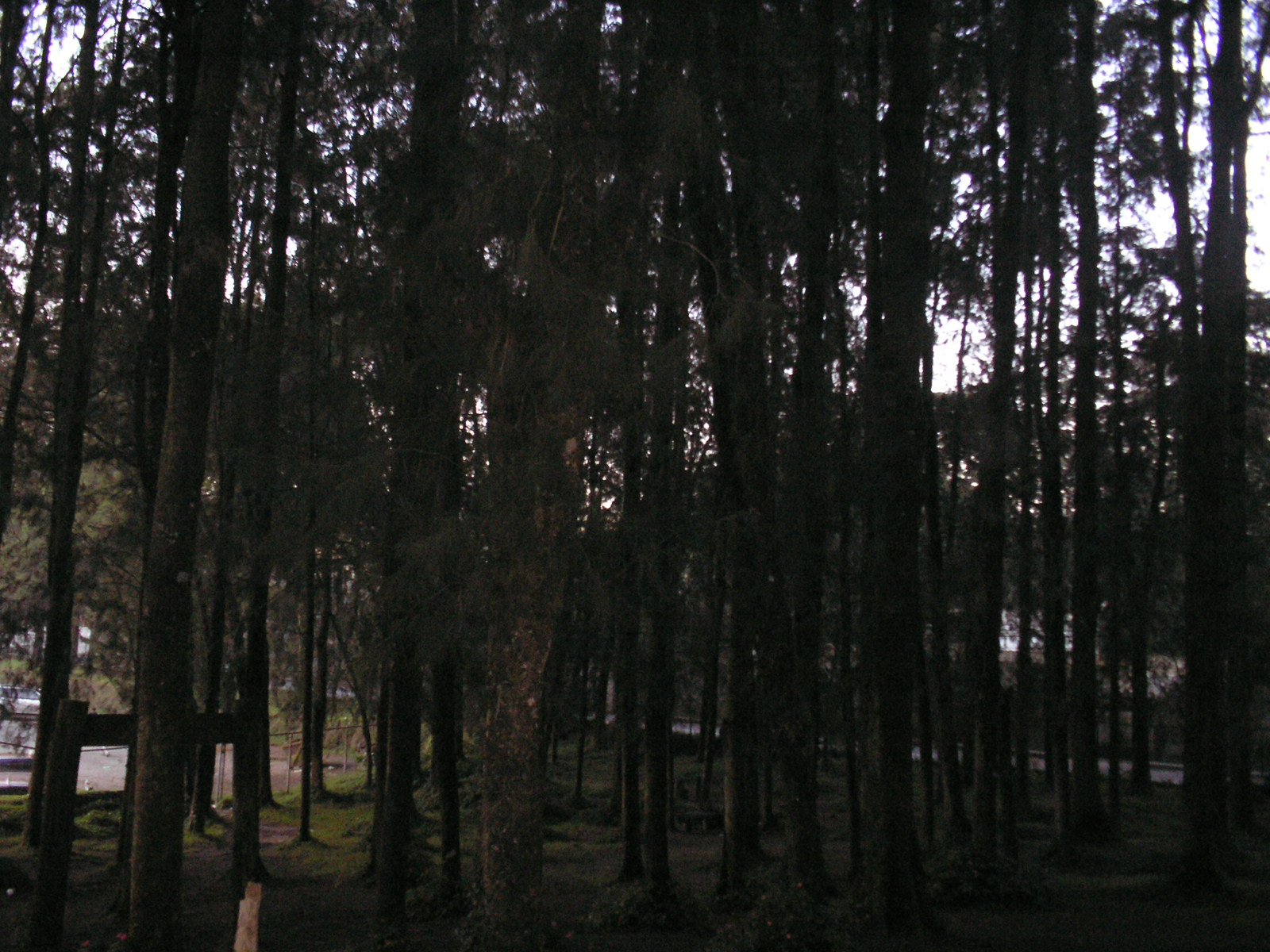

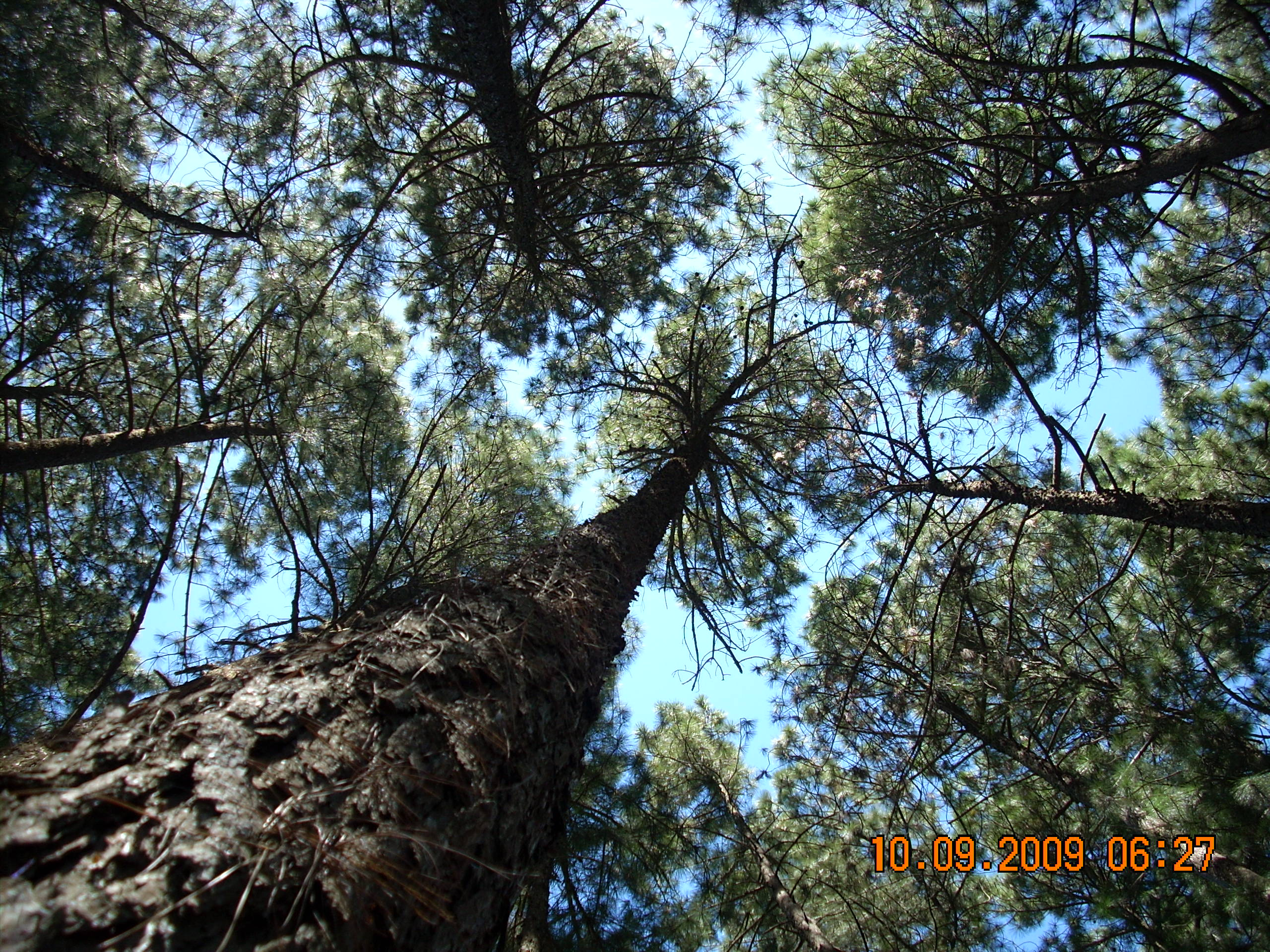

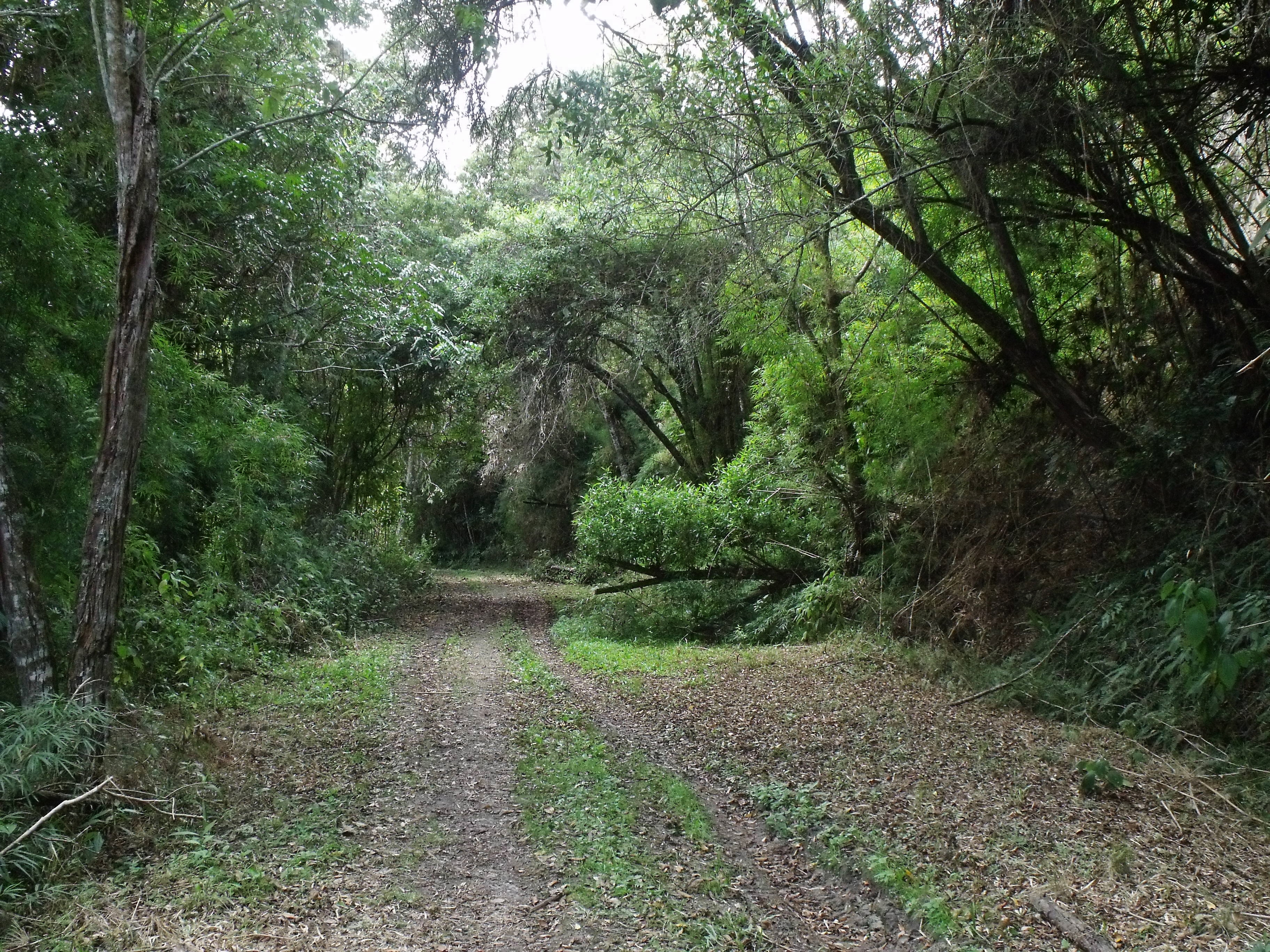

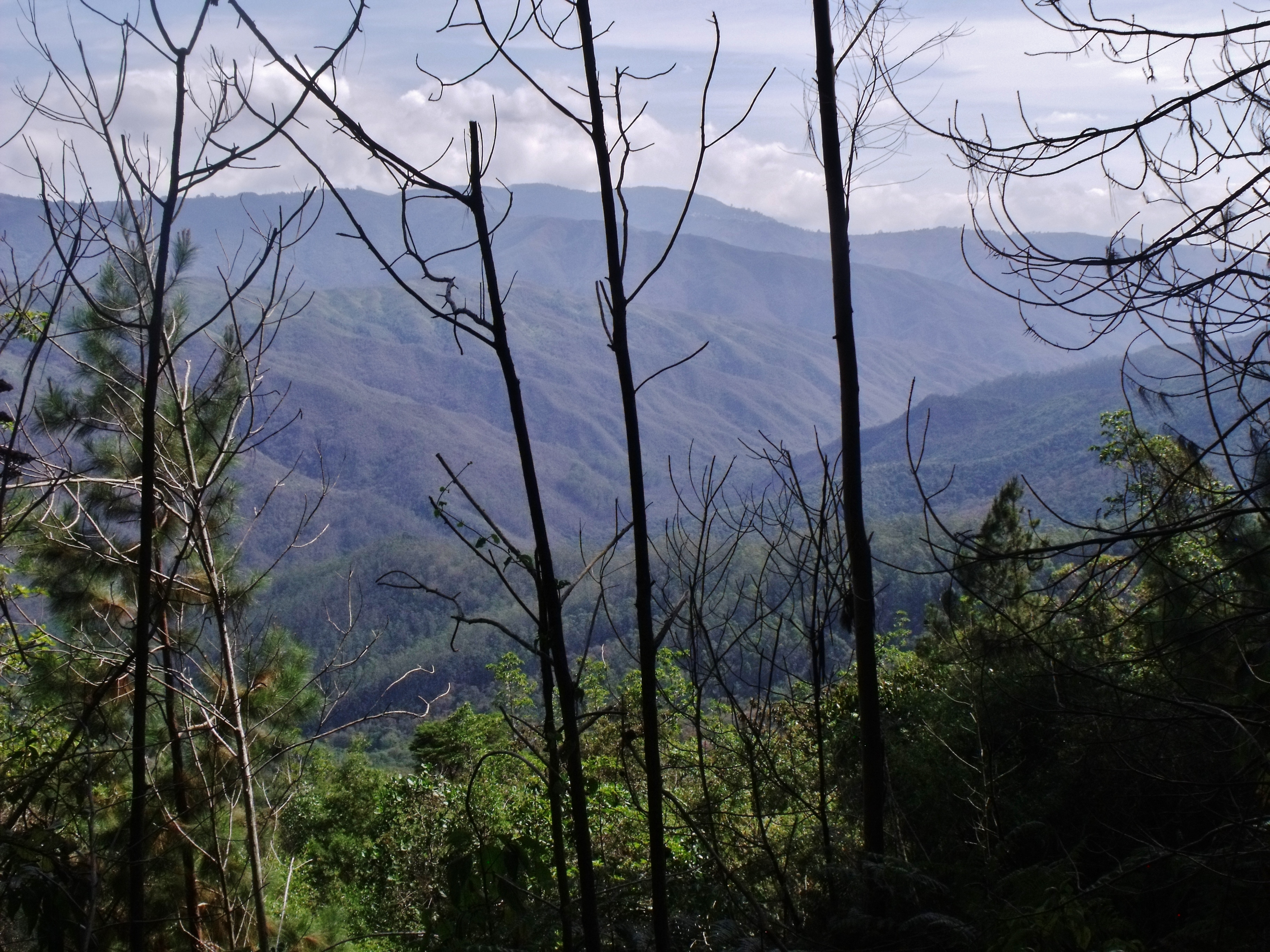

== See also ==
- List of national parks of Venezuela
- Mochima National Park
