= List of national parks of Venezuela =

List in the Wikimedia project

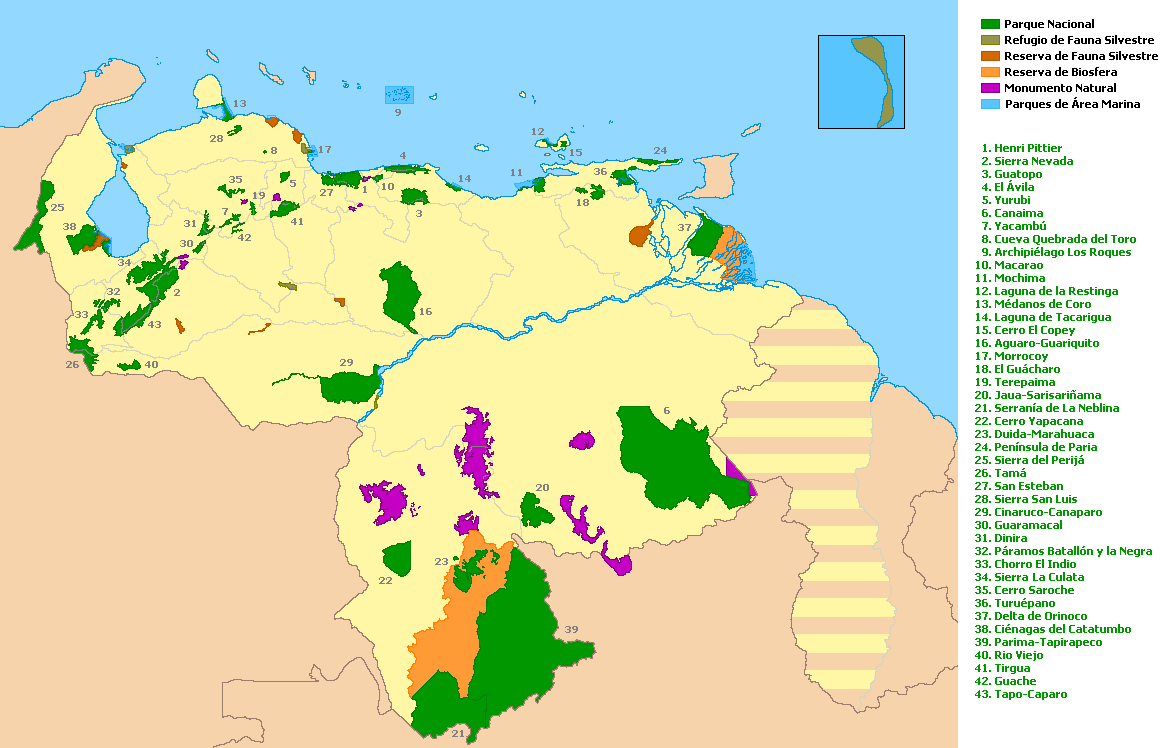
Distribution of Venezuela's national parks

The national parks of Venezuela are protected areas in Venezuela covering a wide range of habitats. In 2007 there were 43 national parks, covering 21.76% of Venezuela's territory.

== Statistics ==
Every Venezuela state has one or more national parks.

- 5 national parks – Lara, Amazonas
- 4 national parks – Falcón, Mérida, Miranda, Portuguesa, and Táchira.
- 3 national parks – Apure, Sucre, and Trujillo.
- 2 national parks – Barinas, Bolívar, Carabobo, Distrito Capital, Guárico, Nueva Esparta, Yaracuy, and Zulia.
- 1 national park – Anzoátegui, Aragua, Cojedes, Delta Amacuro, Federal Dependencies, Monagas, and Vargas.

18 national parks are over 1000 km^{2}; 15 over 2000 km^{2}; 5 over 5000 km^{2} and 3 over 10,000 km^{2}. The largest parks, in the Guayana Region, are Parima Tapirapecó National Park (39,000 km^{2}) and Canaima National Park (30,000 km^{2}).

== List of national parks ==
- ‡ World Heritage Site

National parks of Venezuela
Number	Image	Date established	Name	Region	State	Type	Area (km^{2})
1		2 February 1937	Henri Pittier	Central Region	Aragua; Carabobo	Mountainous	1,078.00
2		2 May 1952	Sierra Nevada	Andean Region	Mérida; Barinas	Mountainous	2,764.46
3		31 March 1958	Guatopo	Central Region	Miranda; Guárico	Mountainous	1,224.64
4		12 December 1958	El Ávila	Capital Region	Federal District; Miranda; Vargas	Mountainous	851.92
5		18 March 1960	Yurubí	Central-Western Region	Yaracuy	Mountainous	236.70
6		12 June 1962	Canaima	Guayana Region	Bolívar	Guayana Shield	30,000.00
7		12 June 1962	Yacambú	Central-Western Region	Lara	Mountainous	269.16
8		21 May 1969	Cueva de la Quebrada del Toro	Central-Western Region	Falcón	Mountainous	48.85
9		8 August 1972	Los Roques	Insular Region	Federal Dependencies	Insular	2,211.20
10		5 December 1973	Macarao	Capital Region	Federal District; Miranda	Mountainous	150
11		19 December 1973	Mochima	North-Eastern Region	Sucre; Anzoátegui	Coastal	949.35
12		6 February 1974	Laguna de La Restinga	Insular Region	Nueva Esparta	Insular	188.62
13		6 February 1974	Médanos de Coro	Central-Western Region	Falcón	Coastal	912.80
14		13 February 1974	Laguna de Tacarigua	Capital Region	Miranda	Coastal	391
15		27 February 1974	Cerro El Copey	Insular Region	Nueva Esparta	Insular	71.30
16		7 March 1974	Aguaro-Guariquito	Llanos Region	Guárico	Llanos	5,690
17		26 May 1974	Morrocoy	Central-Western Region	Falcón	Coastal	320.90
18		27 May 1975	Cueva del Guácharo	North-Eastern Region	Monagas	Mountainous	627
19		14 April 1976	Terepaima	Central-Western Region	Lara; Portuguesa	Mountainous	186.5
20		12 December 1978	Serranía de la Neblina	Guayana Region	Amazonas	Guayana Shield	13,600
21		12 December 1978	Yapacana	Guayana Region	Amazonas	Guayana Shield	3,200
22		12 December 1978	Duida-Marahuaca	Guayana Region	Amazonas	Guayana Shield	3,737.4
23		12 December 1978	Península de Paria	North-Eastern Region	Sucre	Mountainous	375
24		12 December 1978	Sierra de Perijá	Zulian Region	Zulia	Mountainous	2,952.88
25		12 December 1978	El Tamá	Andean Region	Táchira; Apure	Mountainous	1,390
26		14 January 1987	San Esteban	Central Region	Carabobo	Mountainous	445
27		6 May 1987	Sierra de San Luis (J. Crisóstomo Falcón)	Central-Western Region	Falcón	Mountainous	200
28		24 February 1988	Santos Luzardo	Llanos Region	Apure	Mountainous	5,843.68
29		25 May 1988	Guaramacal (G. Cruz Carrillo)	Andean Region	Trujillo; Portuguesa	Mountainous	214.66
30		30 November 1988	Dinira	Central-Western Region	Lara; Portuguesa; Trujillo	Mountainous	453.28
31		18 January 1989	Páramos Batallón y La Negra	Andean Region	Mérida; Táchira	Mountainous	952
32		7 December 1989	Chorro El Indio	Andean Region	Táchira	Mountainous	170
33		7 December 1989	Sierra La Culata	Andean Region	Mérida; Trujillo	Mountainous	2,004
34		7 December 1989	Cerro Saroche	Central-Western Region	Lara	Mountainous	322.94
35		6 June 1991	Turuépano	North-Eastern Region	Sucre	Marshy	726
36		5 June 1991	Delta del Orinoco (Mariusa)	Guayana Region	Delta Amacuro	Deltaic	3,310
37		5 June 1991	Ciénagas de Juan Manuel	Zulian Region	Zulia	Marshy	2,261.3
38		1 August 1991	Parima Tapirapecó	Guayana Region	Amazonas	Guayana Shield	39,000
39		5 June 1992	Río Viejo San Camilo	Llanos Region	Apure	Llanos	800
40		5 June 1992	Tirgua (Gen. Manuel Manrique)	Central-Western Region	Yaracuy; Cojedes	Mountainous	910
41		26 March 1993	El Guache	Central-Western Region	Lara; Portuguesa	Mountainous	125
42		26 March 1993	Tapo-Caparo	Andean Region	Barinas; Mérida; Táchira	Mountainous	2,050
43		21 March 2017	Caura	Guayana Region	Bolívar; Amazonas	Mountainous	75,340

== See also ==
- List of national parks
- Venezuelan bolívar banknotes
