= Laguna de Tacarigua =

- Coordinates: 10.250°N 65.833°W

Laguna de Tacarigua is a town in the state of Miranda, adjacent to the Laguna de Tacarigua National Park in Venezuela.

According to the 2011 census, it has a population of 3,158.
