= Yapacana National Park =

National park in Venezuela

Yapacana National Park Parque Nacional Yapacana
- IUCN category II (national park)
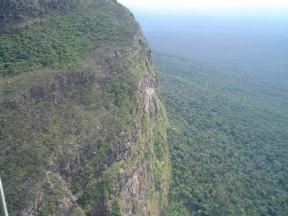

- Location within Venezuela
- Location: Venezuela
- Coordinates: 4°00′N 66°35′W
- Area: 3,200 km^{2} (1,200 sq mi)
- Established: December 12, 1978

The Yapacana National Park (Spanish: Parque nacional Yapacana or Cerro Yapacana National Park) is a protected area with the status of national park in the South American country of Venezuela. It was formed on December 12, 1978 by executive decree of President Carlos Andres Perez. It is located southwest of the confluence of the Ventuari River on the Orinoco River, in the jurisdiction of the Atabapo municipality of Amazonas state.

Among the ecological and protection objectives of the Yapacana National Park is preserving and conserving areas that represent a valuable scenic and scientific resource, with a pioneering vegetation, a testimony to the evolution of the vegetation with Paleotropic and Neotropic floristic connections.

The Yapacana National Park is located in the southwestern sector of the Guayanese shield in the central western region of the Amazon state between the Orinoco rivers in the south and the Ventuari river in the north and the Yagua river in the west. The park includes the Yapacana hill, typical Pantepuy plateau of the Roraima formation.

== See also ==
- List of national parks of Venezuela
- Morrocoy National Park
