= Guaramacal National Park =

Protected area in Venezuela

Guaramacal National Park Parque Nacional Guaramacal
- IUCN category II (national park)
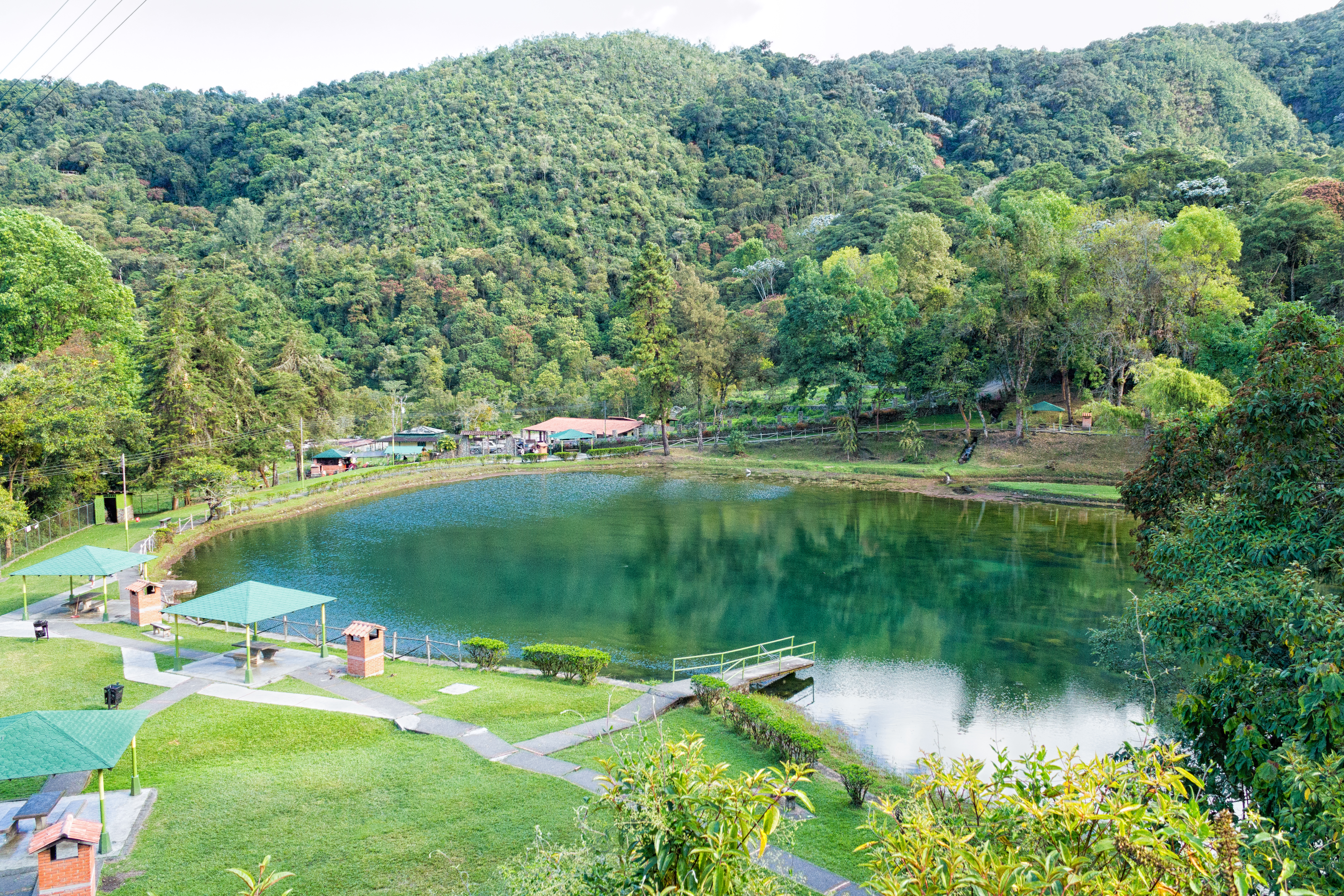

- Location within Venezuela
- Location: Venezuela
- Coordinates: 9°12′N 70°11′W
- Area: 215 km^{2} (83 sq mi)
- Established: May 25, 1988

The Guaramacal National Park (Spanish: Parque nacional Guaramacal) Also General Cruz Carrillo National Park Is a protected area with the status of a national park located between the states of Portuguesa and Trujillo in the South American country of Venezuela. It has an area of about 214.66 km^{2} (82.88 sq mi) and includes the Guaramacal Branch, the most northerly spur of the Cordillera de Mérida. The limits of the park are 1,600–1,800 m (5,200–5,900 ft) in height, and the maximum elevation, in the moor of Guaramacal, is to 3,100 m (10,200 ft).

The Guaramacal can be distinguished by a great endemism, highlighted by the presence of species such as the palmera frailejón Ruilopezia paltoniode.

Its flora is still under study and the provisional inventory has about 1,227 species, highlighting an important richness of orchids and ferns, as well as various endemic species of frailejones.

The first floristic studies within the park date from 1987, and mentioned a total of 482 species of plants. A more thorough and systematic study in 2000 yielded a total of 147 families, 517 genera and at least 1227 species, providing descriptions for 33 new taxa for science.

== Gallery ==
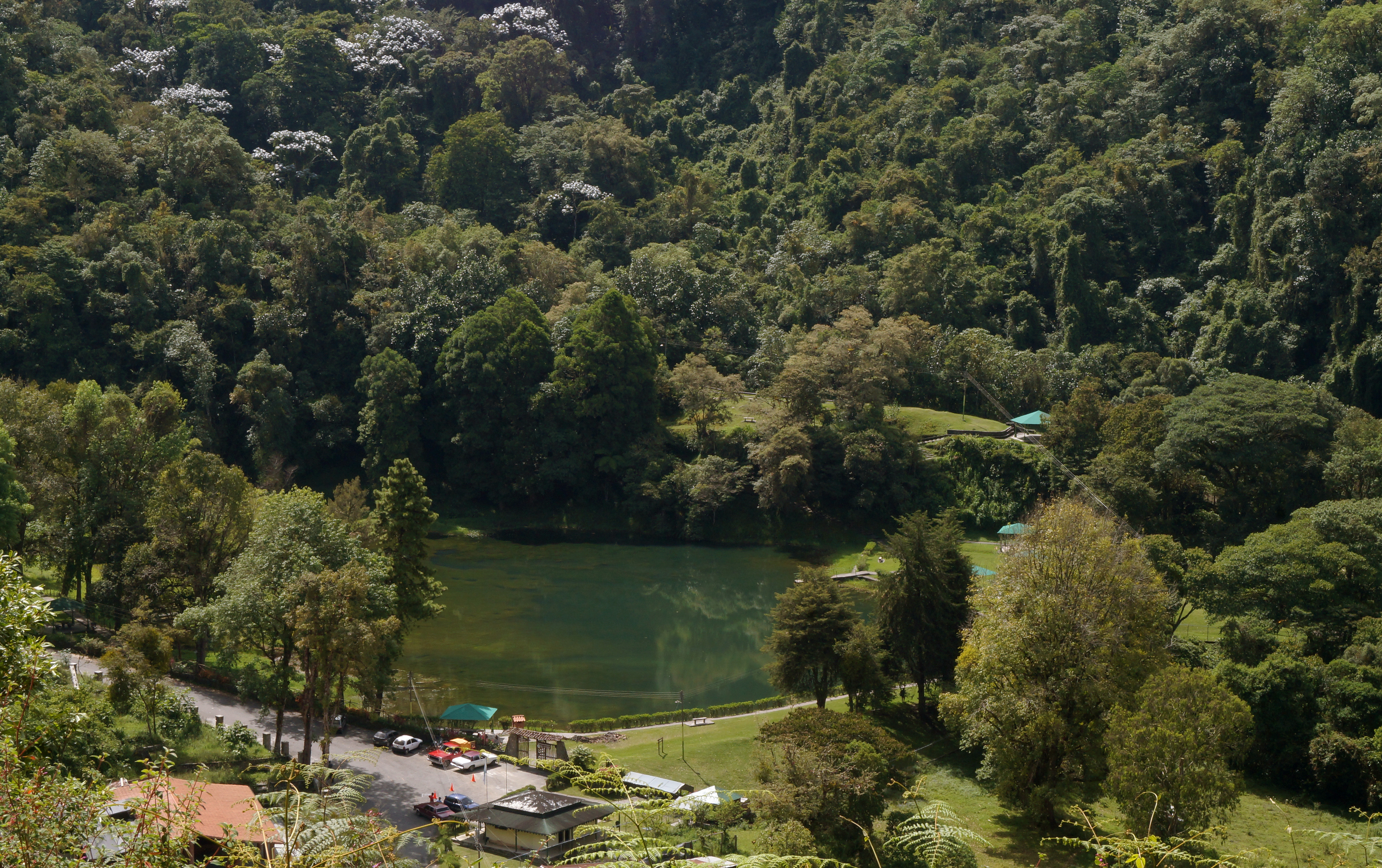

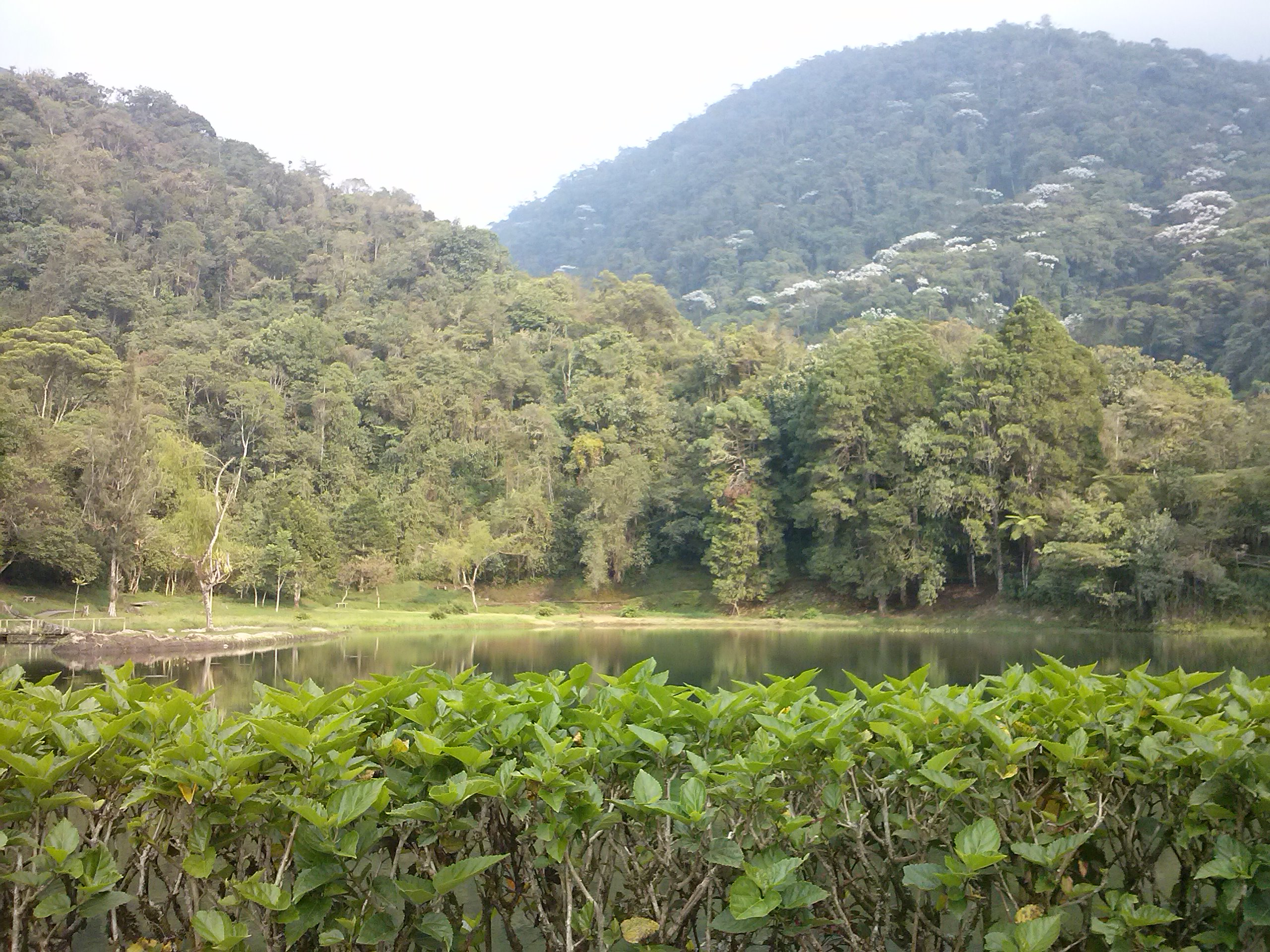

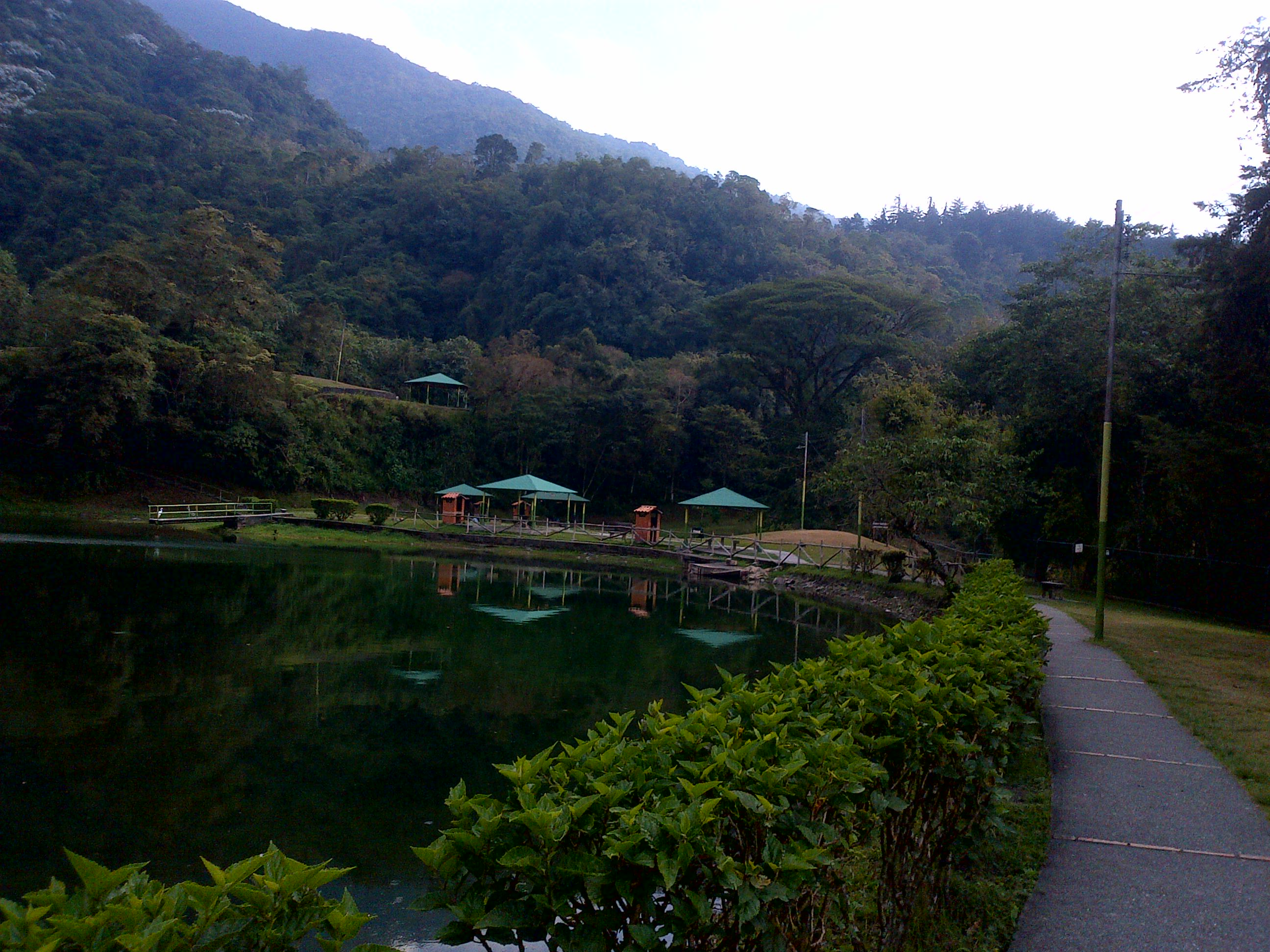

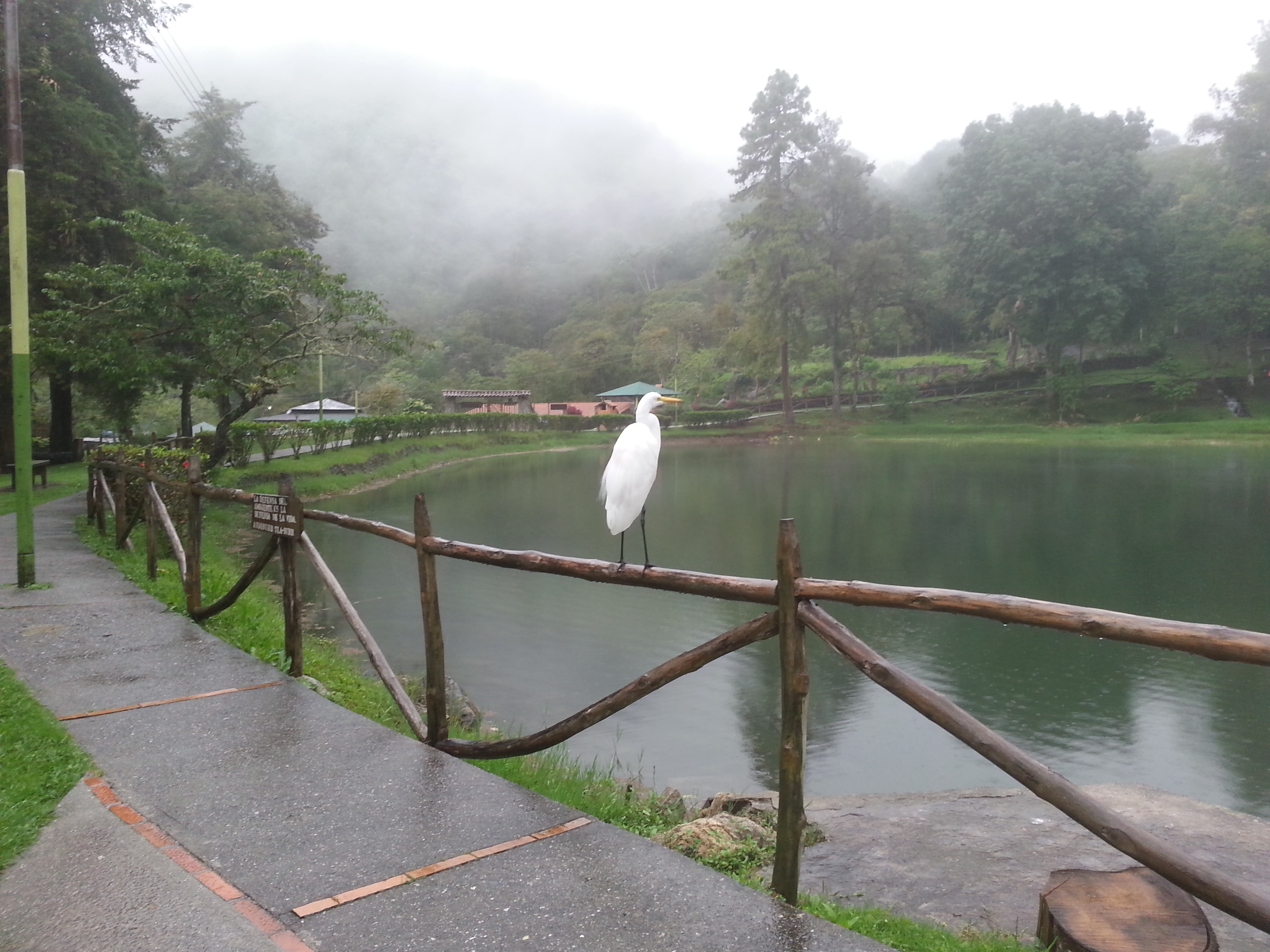

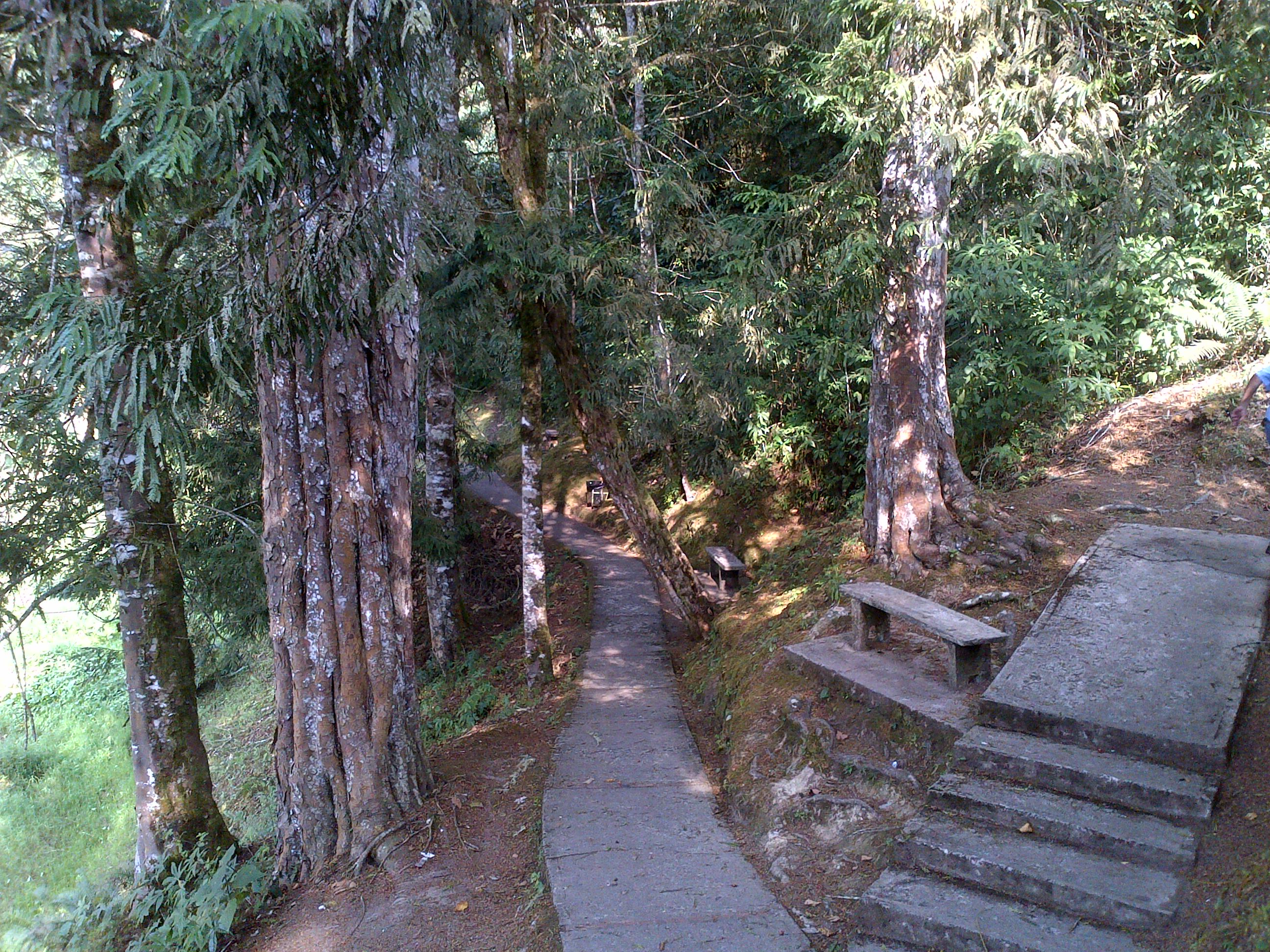

== See also ==
- List of national parks of Venezuela
- Mochima National Park
