= Tapo-Caparo National Park =

Protected area in Venezuela

Tapo-Caparo National Park Parque nacional Tapo-Caparo
- IUCN category II (national park)
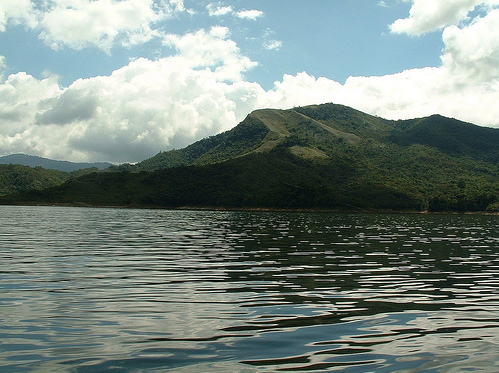

- Location within Venezuela
- Location: Venezuela
- Coordinates: 8°08′N 71°08′W
- Area: 2,050 km^{2} (790 sq mi)
- Established: 1992

The Tapo-Caparo National Park (Spanish: Parque nacional Tapo-Caparo), or National Park Tapo Caparo, is a protected area with national park status in Venezuela. The park covers 2,050 square kilometres (790 sq mi) in the western states of Barinas, Mérida, and Táchira.

The national park was decreed on 14 January 1992 by the government of Carlos Andrés Pérez, with the purpose of protecting the natural environment around the Uribante-Caparo hydroelectric project.

It has a diversity of forests, ferns and mosses, lichens, and fungi. Fauna includes jaguars, toucans, and boas. The park contains numerous gorges and rivers.

== See also ==
- List of national parks of Venezuela
- Canaima National Park
