= Río Viejo San Camilo National Park =

Protected area in Venezuela

Río Viejo San Camilo National Park Parque nacional Río Viejo-San Camilo
- IUCN category II (national park)
- Location within Venezuela
- Location: Venezuela
- Coordinates: 7°30′N 72°04′W
- Area: 800 km^{2} (310 sq mi)
- Established: 1993

The Río Viejo San Camilo National Park (Spanish: Parque nacional Río Viejo-San Camilo), or Rio Viejo-San Camilo National Park, Is a protected area with the status of national park in the South American country of Venezuela. Specifically its territory is part of the state of Apure near the border with Colombia. It has an estimated area of 80,000 hectares, which constitute national park since 1 July 1993.

Its vegetation is constituted basically by savannahs that include trees like the samán, the ceiba, the apamate and the palm macanilla. Its height varies in a range that goes from the 34 and 225 meters on the level of the sea. Due to the existence of numerous rivers there is a varied fauna that includes from turtles, to herons and parrots.

== See also ==
- List of national parks of Venezuela
- Mochima National Park
