= Laguna de Tacarigua National Park =

National park in Venezuela

Laguna de Tacarigua National Park Parque nacional Laguna de Tacarigua
- IUCN category II (national park)
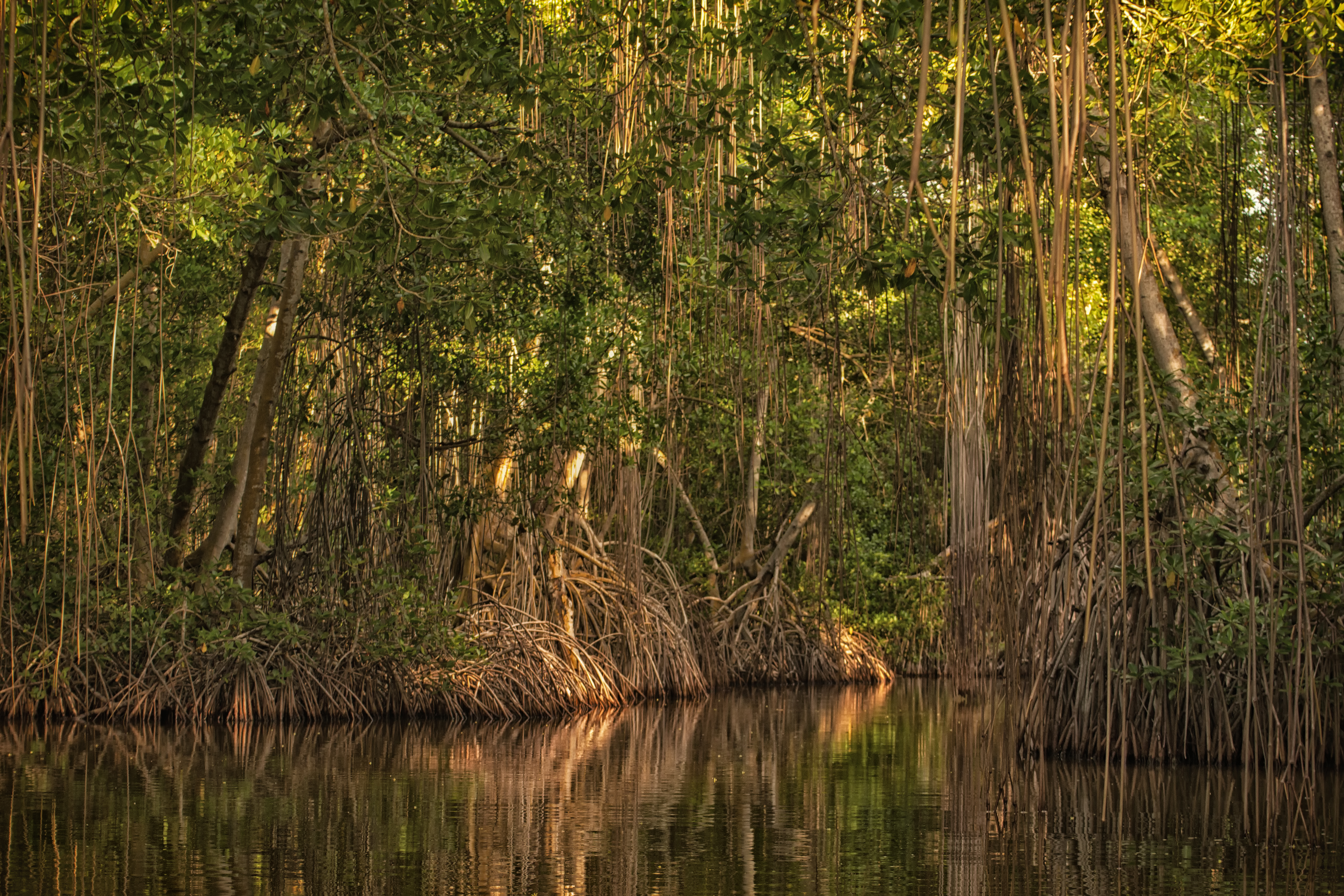

- Location within Venezuela
- Location: Venezuela
- Coordinates: 10°16′N 65°51′W
- Area: 391 km^{2} (151 sq mi)
- Established: 1974

The Laguna de Tacarigua National Park (Spanish: Parque nacional Laguna de Tacarigua), also known as Tacarigua Lagoon National Park, is a protected area with the status of a national park located east of Miranda State, close to the town of Laguna de Tacarigua in the South American country of Venezuela. It comprises a permanent coastal lagoon of 7800 ha and 1.2 m of average depth, separated from the sea by a restinga or coastal barrier of 28.8 km long and 300–1000 m wide that was formed by the action of the sea current which runs along the coast in an East-West direction.

To the south of the lagoon extends an area dominated by dry forests and to the north, a marine area of 20,700 ha. In total the park covers 39,100 ha. Approximately 4,000 ha of the park are covered by mangrove forests that grow on the banks of the lagoon and even form dense islands towards the center. The lagoon is fed by fresh water mainly from the Guapo River but also from other tributaries such as the Pirital, San Nicolás, San Ignacio and Chaguaramal streams. In its northwestern sector the lagoon communicates with the sea through a mouth. In times of severe drought in the Guapo River basin, the decrease in freshwater intake and the accumulation of sediments cause mouth filling, and consequently an increase in the salinity of the lagoon waters.

The park comprises three main ecosystems: a shallow brackish lagoon, a dry forest area and a sandy beach barrier or reef.

== Gallery ==
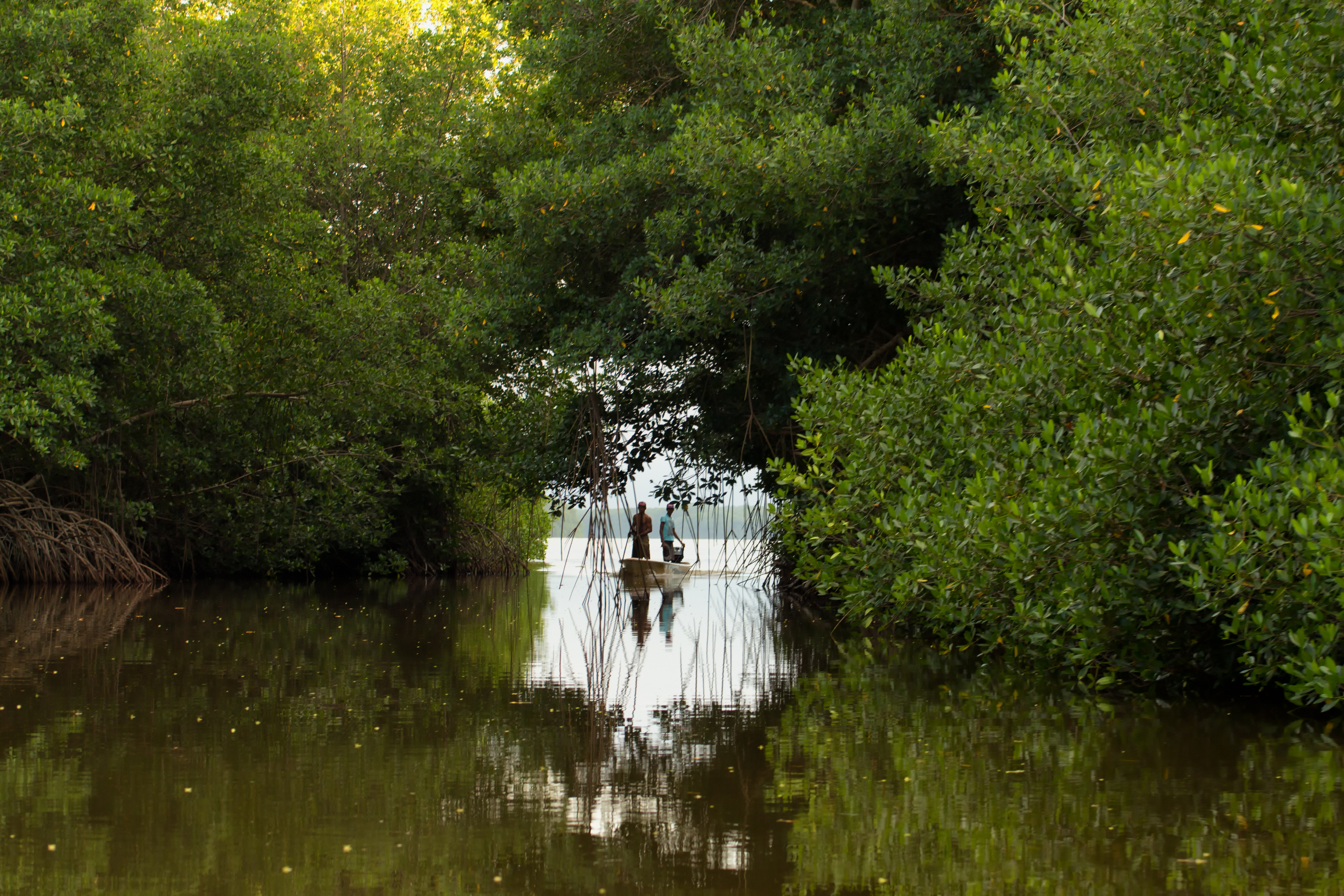

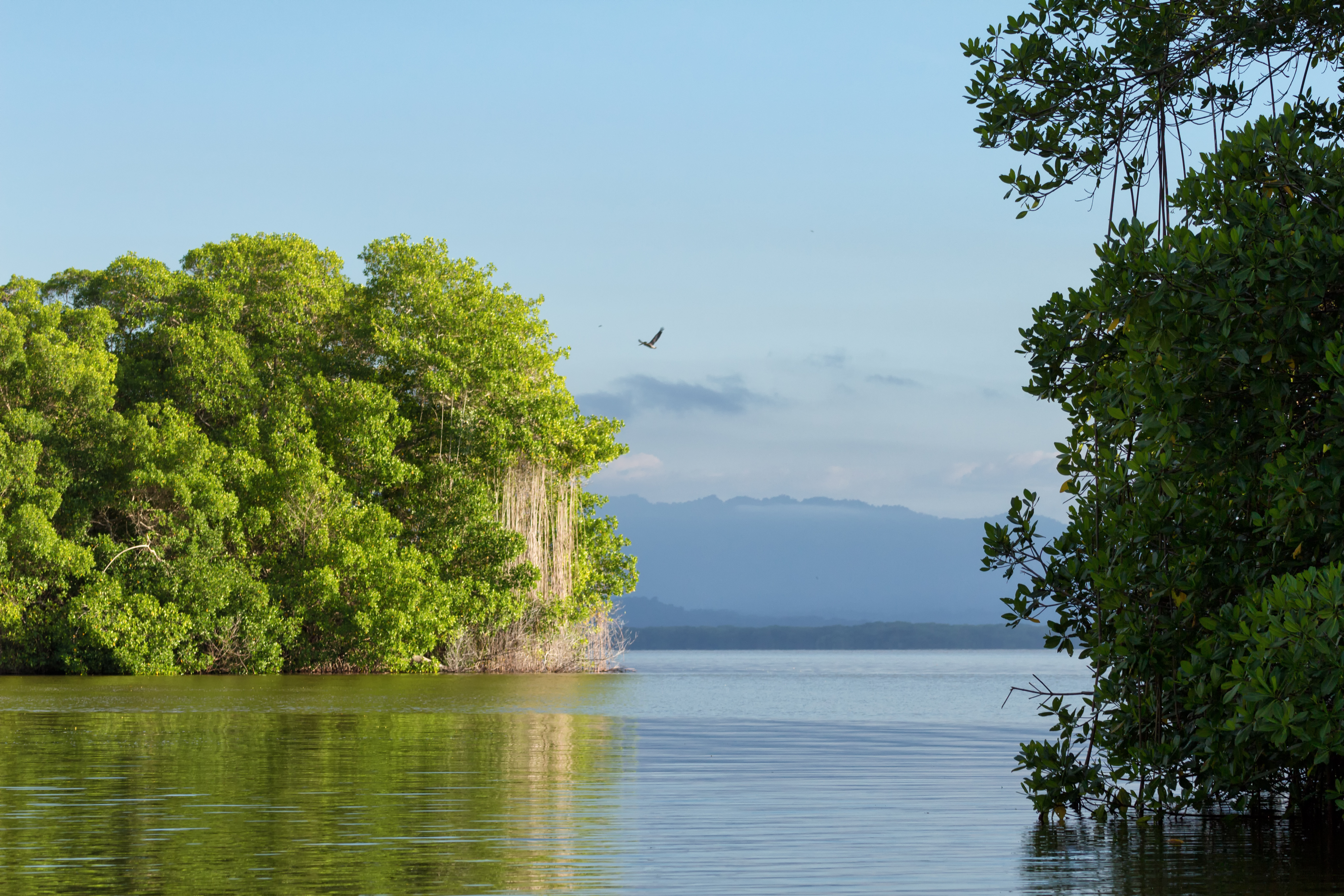

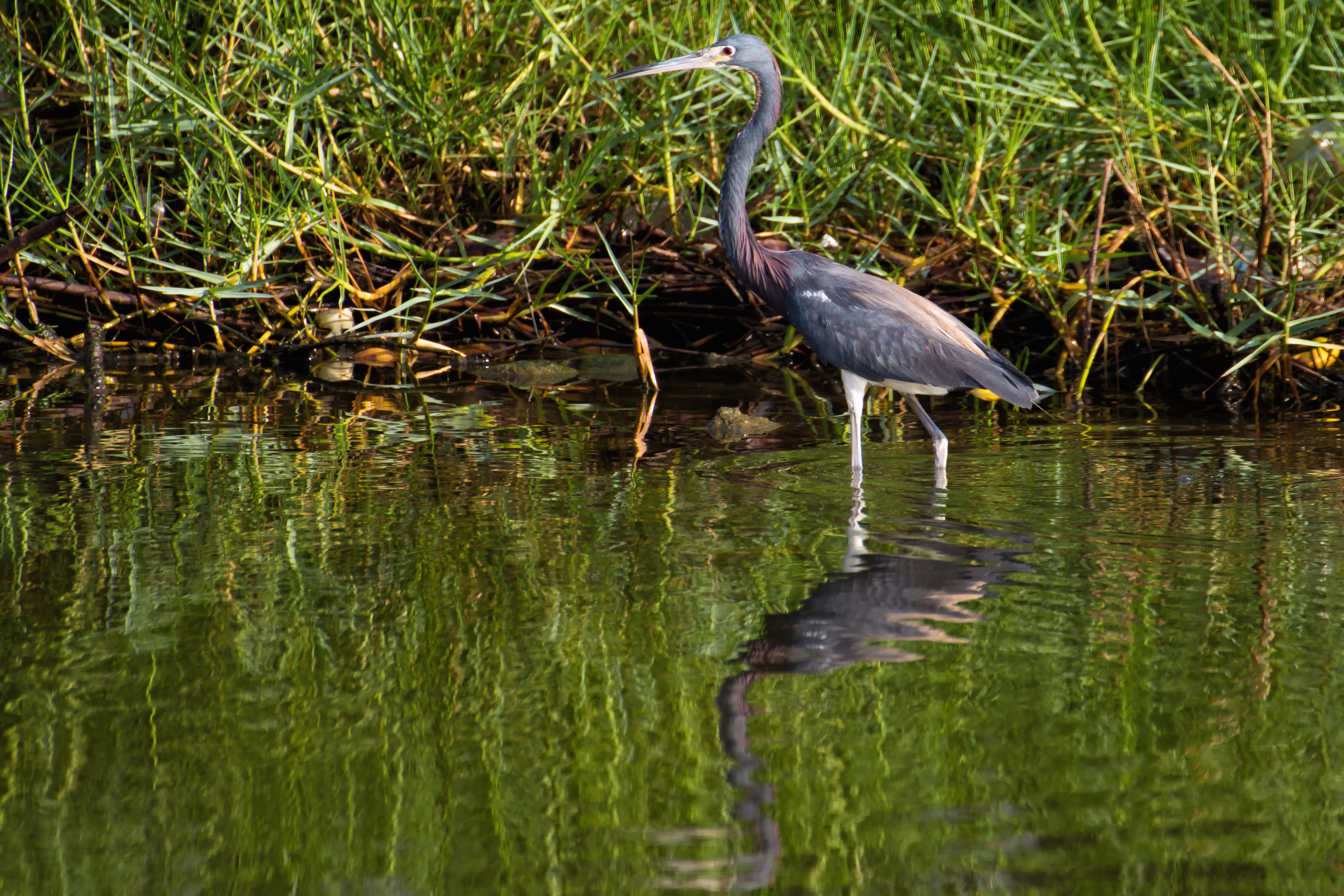

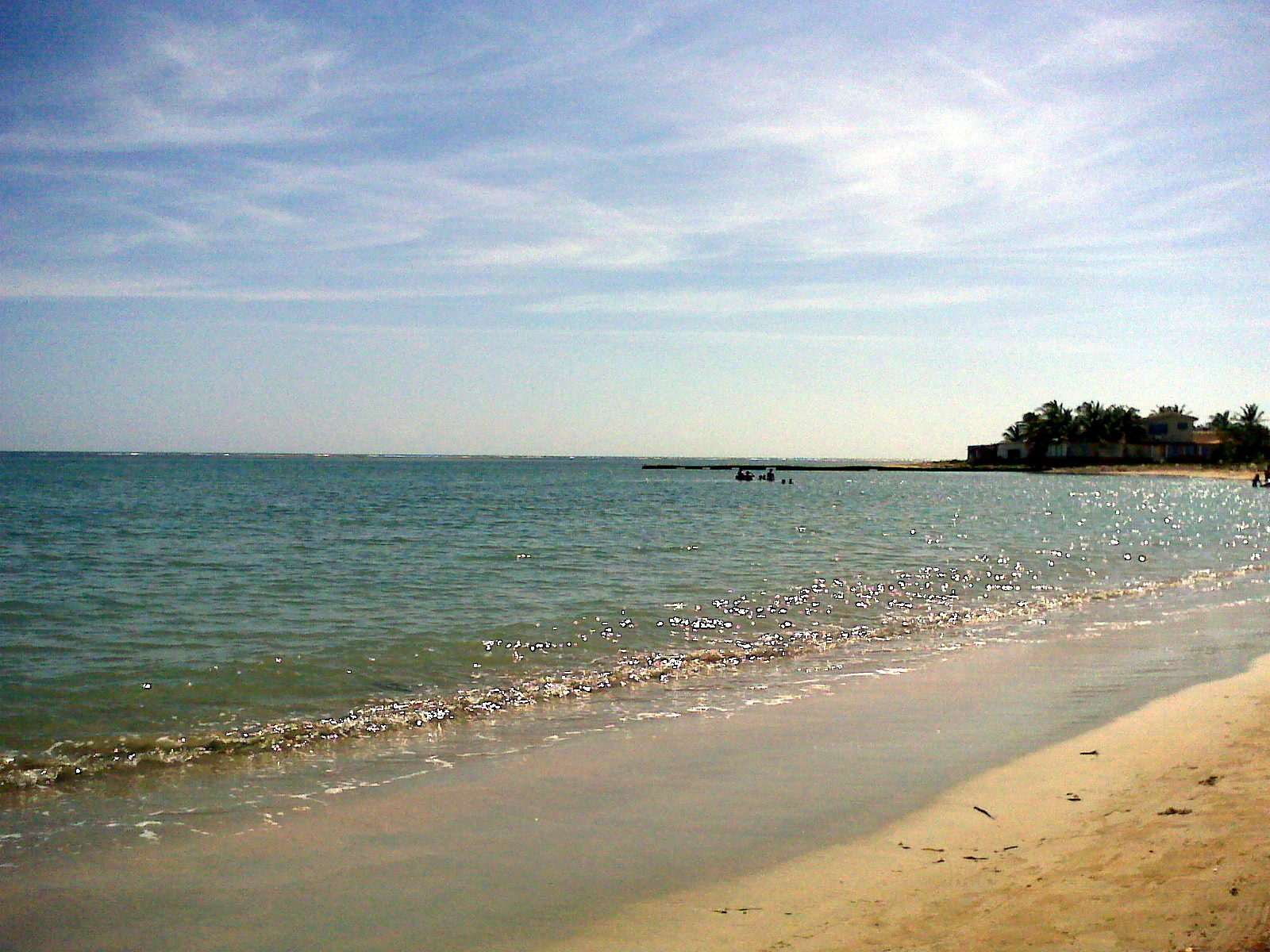

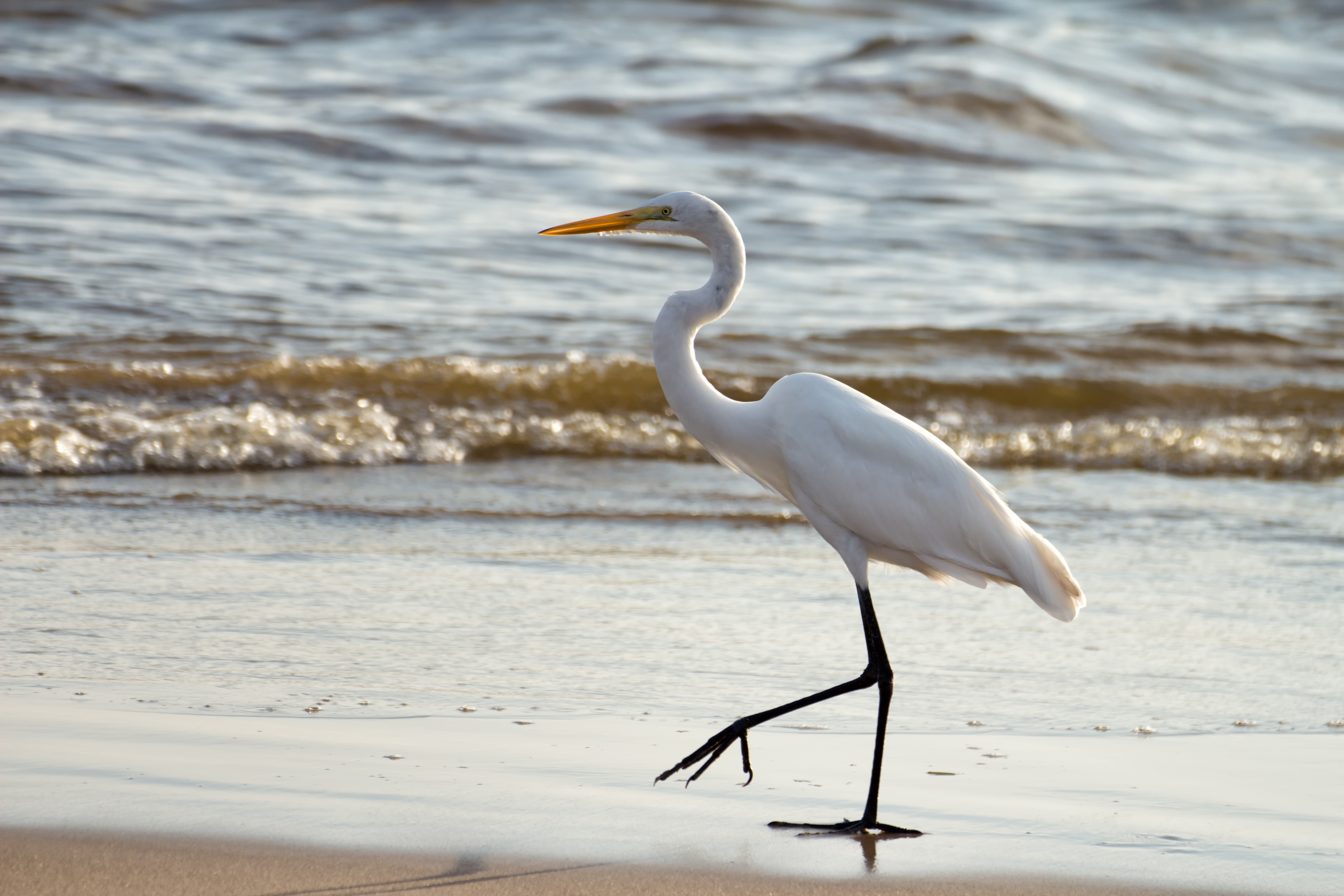

== See also ==
- List of national parks of Venezuela
- Canaima National Park
