= Cerro Saroche National Park =

National park in Venezuela

- IUCN category II (national park)
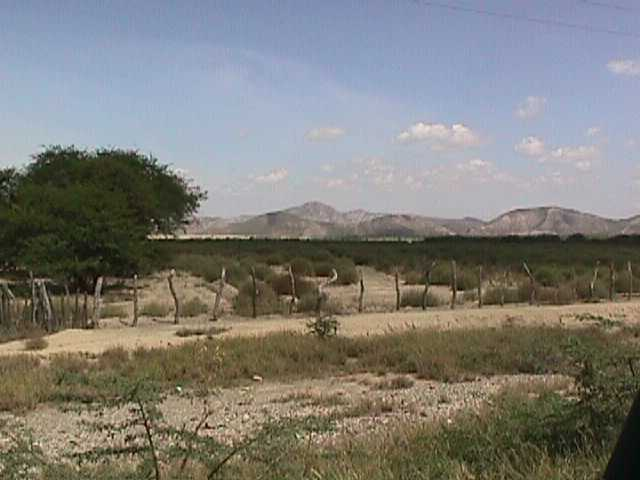
- Cerro Saroche N.P.

- Location within Venezuela
- Location: Venezuela
- Nearest city: Carora
- Coordinates: 10.2°N 69.5°W
- Area: 91 km^{2} (35 sq mi)
- Established: 7 December 1989
- Governing body: Instituto Nacional de Parques (INPARQUES)

Cerro Saroche National Park (Spanish: Parque Nacional Cerro Saroche) is a Venezuelan national park located in the state of Lara, between Barquisimeto and Carora. The National Park was created in 1989.

The park is located within a large semi-arid region in the Carora Depression in northwest Venezuela, with a terrain characterized by rolling hills, plains and mountains that range in altitude between 300 and 1300 m. The park covers an area of 32,294 ha. Mean annual temperature is 27 °C and mean annual precipitation varies between 300 and 600 mm, distributed in two rainy seasons, the first between May and June, and the second and usually more intense, between October and December.

== Fauna and flora ==
The orchid Schoromburquia humboldtiana is a characteristic plant of the higher, humid regions of the park.

== Threats ==
The exotic plants Kalanchoe daigremontana and Stapelia gigantea invade parts of the park and can influence the recruitment of native plants.

== See also ==
- List of national parks of Venezuela
