= Terepaima National Park =

National park in Venezuela

Terepaima National Park Parque Nacional Terepaima
- IUCN category II (national park)
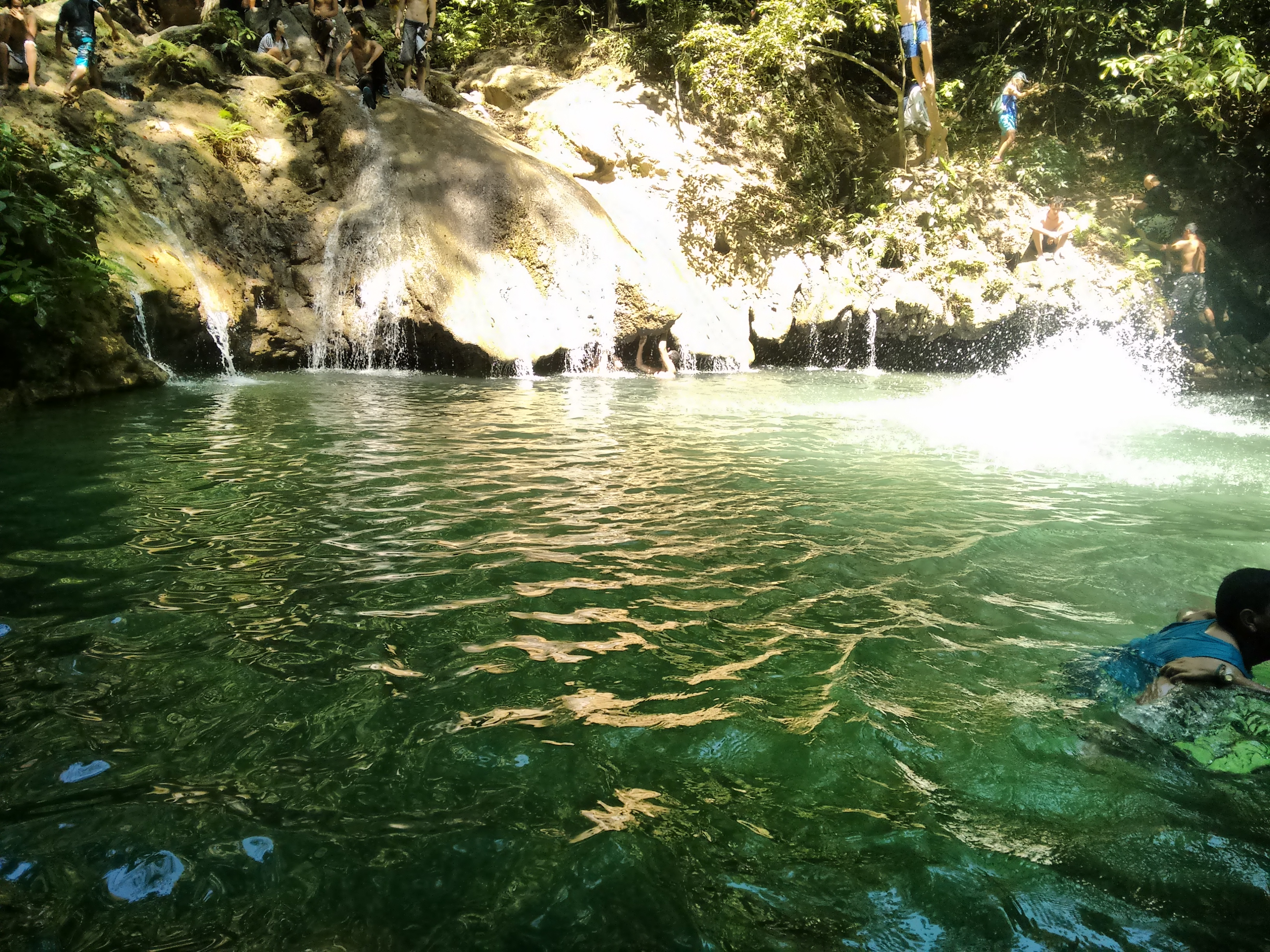

- Location within Venezuela
- Location: Venezuela
- Coordinates: 9°52′N 69°16′W
- Area: 186.5 km^{2} (72.0 sq mi)
- Established: April 14, 1976

The Terepaima National Park (Spanish: Parque nacional Terepaima) Is a protected area with the status of national park in the South American country of Venezuela located in the mountainous region of the Lara and Portuguesa States. Specifically southeast of the city of Barquisimeto, capital of the Lara State, it covers areas belonging to the municipalities Iribarren, Palavecino and Simón Planas.

It was decreed National Park on April 14, 1976, with the purpose of protecting the flora and fauna of the region. It has an area of 18,971 hectares.

Its temperature varies between 19 and 26 degrees Celsius. Its vegetation in the highest parts is of cloud forest with the presence of trees such as mountaineers, salvio and mountain manzanita, as well as several species of ferns.

In the park there are several endangered species such as the front and jaguar bear, other mammals such as cachicamos, lapas, rabipelados, monkeys araguatos, capuchin monkeys, mapurites, cunaguaros, deer, dantas, bears meleros, pumas and báquiros.

== See also ==
- List of national parks of Venezuela
- Mochima National Park

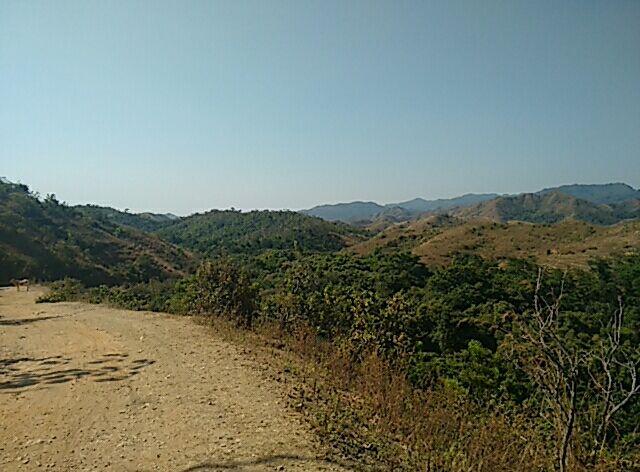
Another view
