= Chorro El Indio National Park =

National park in Venezuela

Chorro El Indio National Park Parque nacional Chorro El Indio
- IUCN category II (national park)
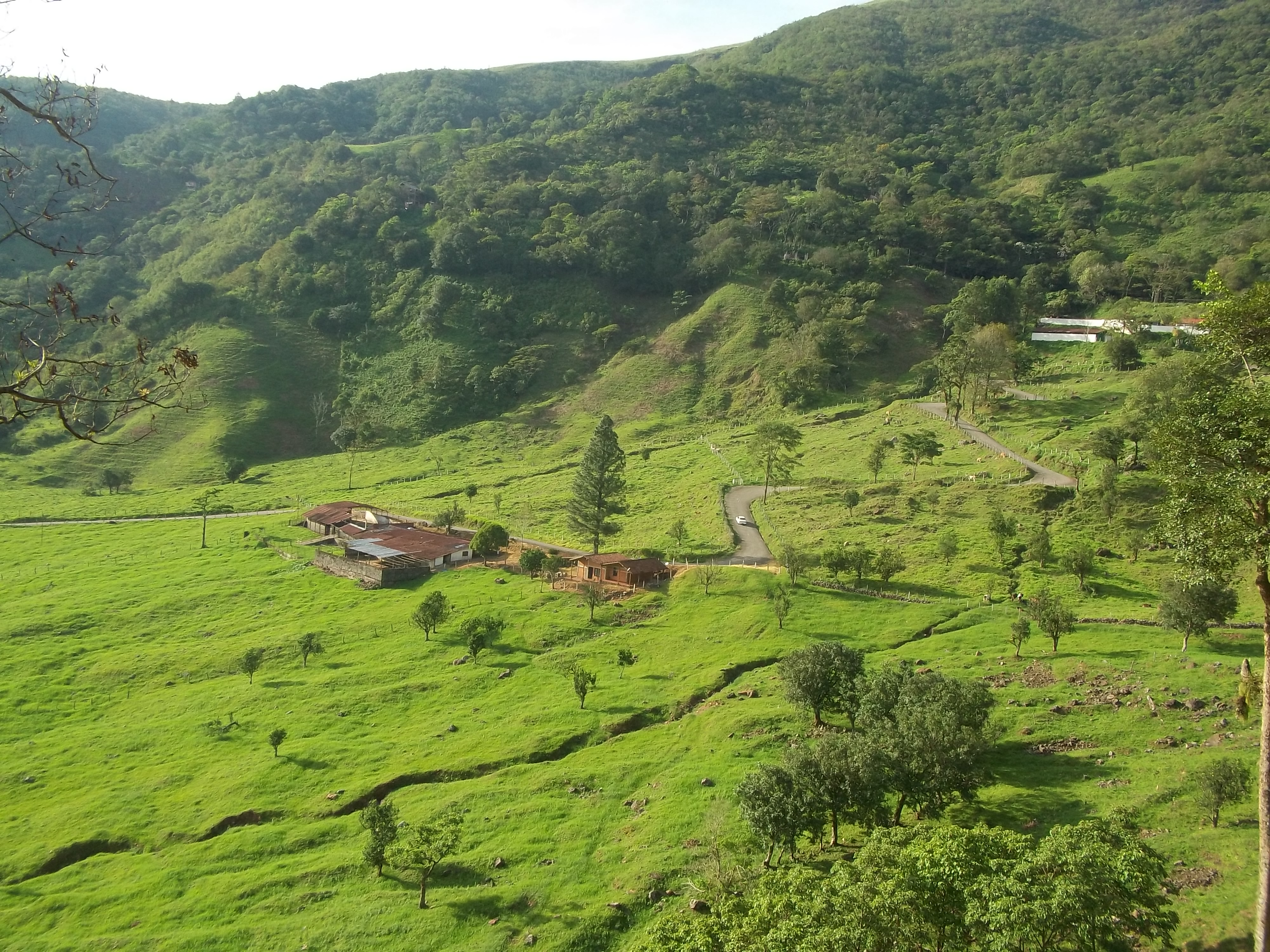

- Location within Venezuela
- Location: Venezuela
- Coordinates: 7°45′N 72°10′W
- Area: 170 km^{2} (66 sq mi)
- Established: 1989

The Chorro El Indio National Park (Spanish: Parque nacional Chorro El Indio) is a national park of Venezuela located to the east of San Cristóbal, Táchira State, in the mountain range the Maravillaz. It has access by the highway San Cristóbal - Macanillo - Potosí.

The area includes the paramos of Guarín, El Pino, El Moradeño, El Moraleño, El Oso, Cerro La Maravilla and Cerro El Chimborazo, within which are the waterfalls Chorro El Indio and Chorro El Franklin, at the headwaters of the river Zúñiga. It reached the rank of National Park by decree dated December 7, 1989 by the then president of the republic Carlos Andrés Pérez.

It has an approximate area of 17,000 hectares, with a range between 1100 m and 2600 m, a temperature varying between 12 °C and 23 °C, with a warm mountain rainy climate, the average annual rainfall is 2000 mm.

== See also ==
- List of national parks of Venezuela
- Mochima National Park

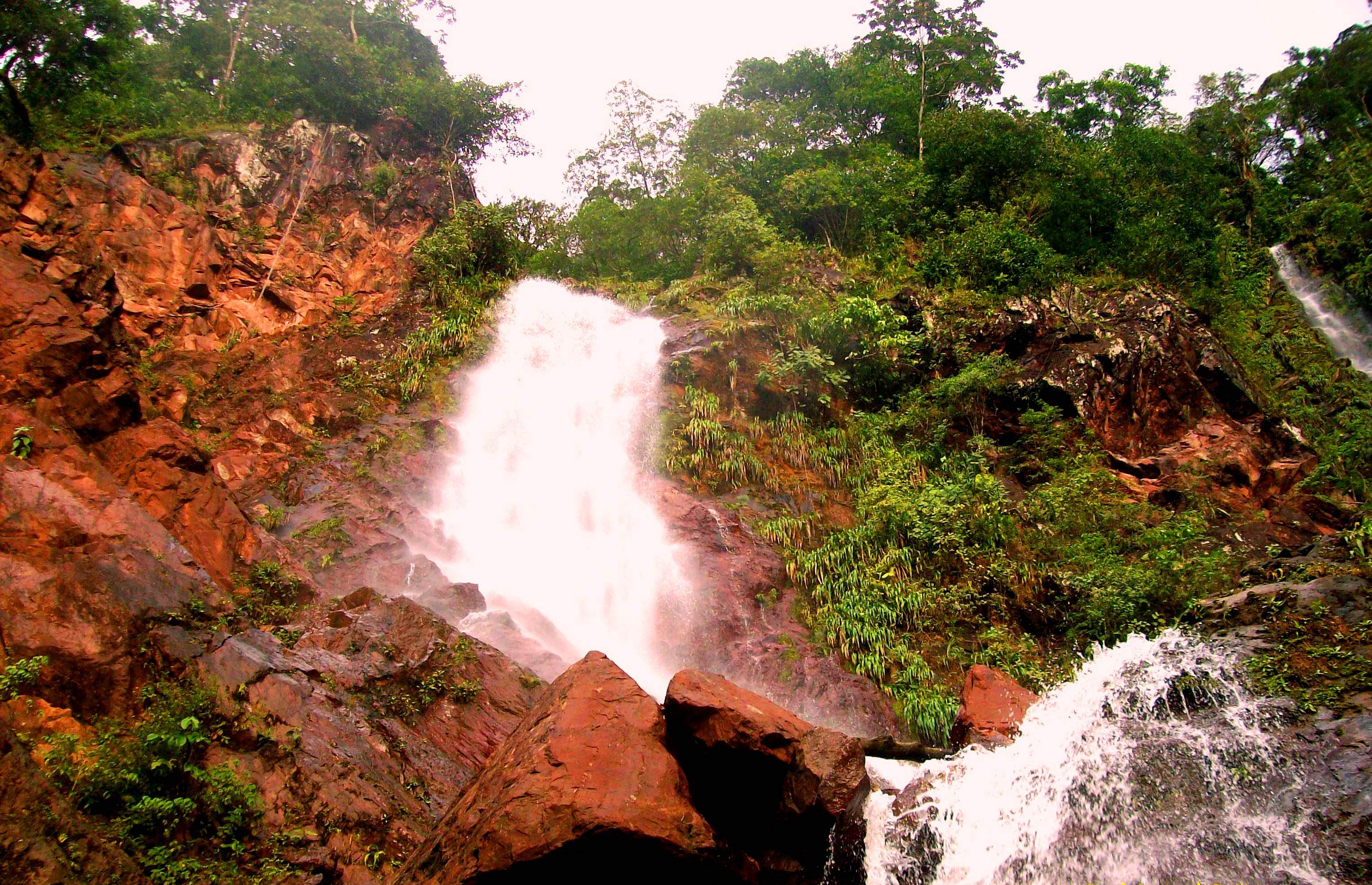
Chorro El Indio Waterfall
