= Tirgua National Park =

National park in Venezuela

Tirgua National Park Parque nacional Tirgua
- IUCN category II (national park)
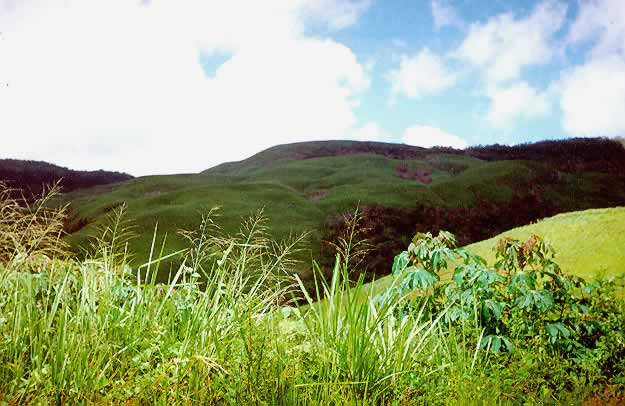

- Location within Venezuela
- Location: Venezuela
- Coordinates: 9°51′N 68°40′W
- Area: 910 km^{2} (350 sq mi)
- Established: June 5, 1992

Tirgua National Park (Spanish: Parque nacional Tirgua), also known as General Manuel Manrique National Park, is a national park in Venezuela. It protects the headwaters of several waterways, especially the river Tirgua, which gives its name to the park.

It is located between the municipalities San Carlos and Anzoátegui of the state Cojedes and the municipality Nirgua of the state Yaracuy, occupying an approximate area of 910 km^{2}.

It consists of deciduous and semi-deciduous forests, with many palm trees in the understory.

Mammals include araguato capuchin monkeys, cunaguaros, lapas, and tapirs.

== See also ==
- List of national parks of Venezuela
- Morrocoy National Park
