= General Juan Pablo Peñaloza National Park =

National park in Venezuela

General Juan Pablo Peñaloza National Park Parque Nacional General Juan Pablo Peñaloza
- IUCN category II (national park)
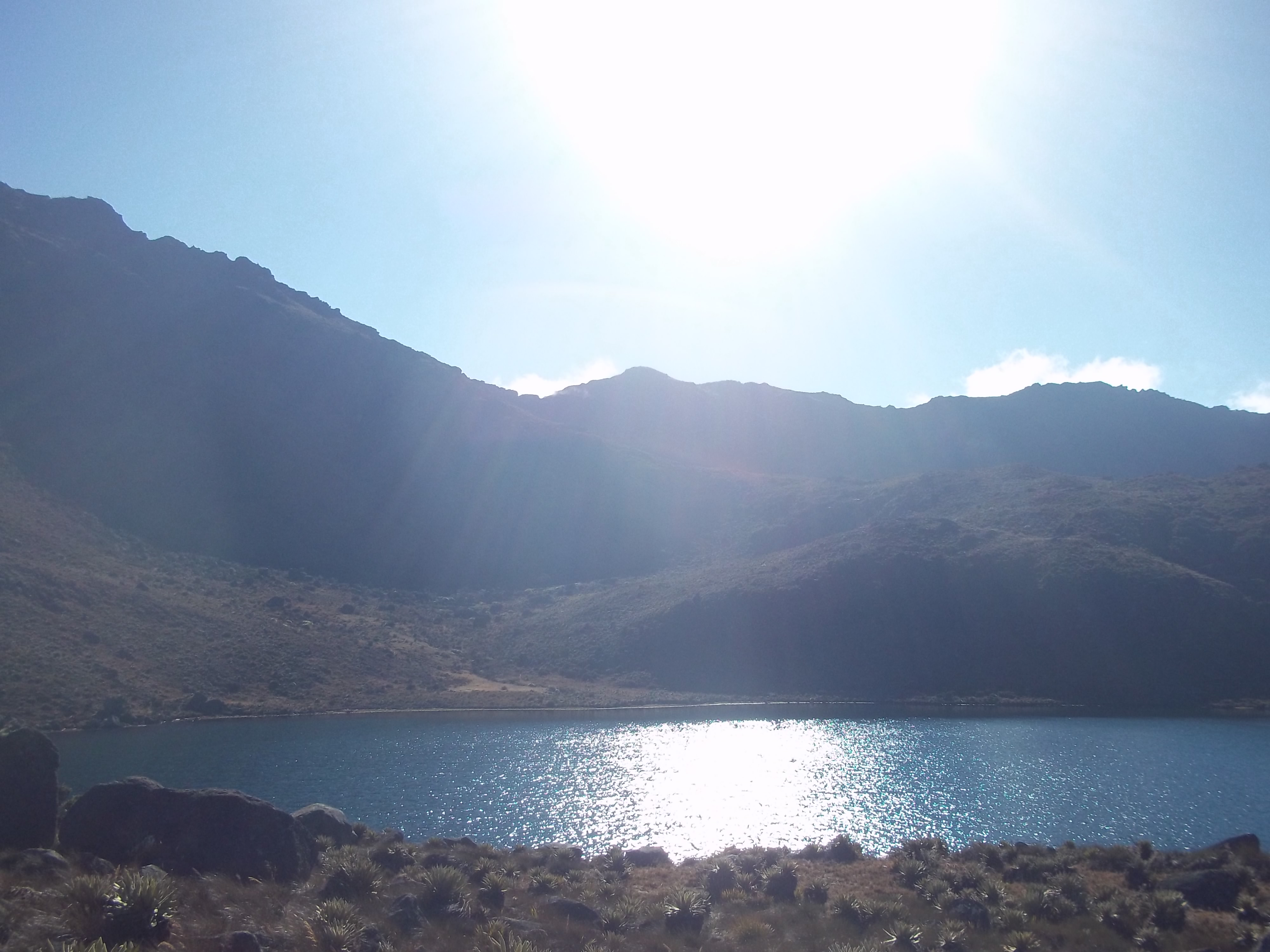
- Grande Lagoon, General Juan Pablo Peñaloza National Park

- Location within Venezuela
- Location: Venezuela
- Coordinates: 7°59′N 71°57′W
- Area: 752 km^{2} (290 sq mi)
- Established: January 18, 1989; 37 years ago

The General Juan Pablo Peñaloza National Park (Spanish: Parque nacional General Juan Pablo Peñaloza), also Páramos Batallón y La Negra National Park, is a national park of Venezuela that is formed by several páramos. Among them Batallón and La Negra, which are an important source of water supply. It is located between the states Mérida and Táchira, northwest of the Táchira Depression in the Páramos de El Batallón and La Negra in Venezuela.

The rivers Uribante, Escalante, La Grita, Mocotíes, El Molino, Torbes, Orope, Umuquena, Bobo, Pereña and Quebrada Grande and the waters that feed the Uribante-Caparo hydroelectric complex are born here.

It is a set of mountain ranges with elevations ranging from 1,800 to 3,942 m (5,906 to 12,933 ft) AMSL at the summit of its peak El Pulpito, the highest in the Táchira state, in addition to more than 130 periglacial lagoons of various sizes. The park has a very rugged relief, with steep slopes where in some sectors the glaciers are observed. Among its largest lagoons are the lagoon of Bobo river or Babu, the Grande, Verde, Negra, large hole, Piedra, etc. among many others without officially cataloging.

== Gallery ==
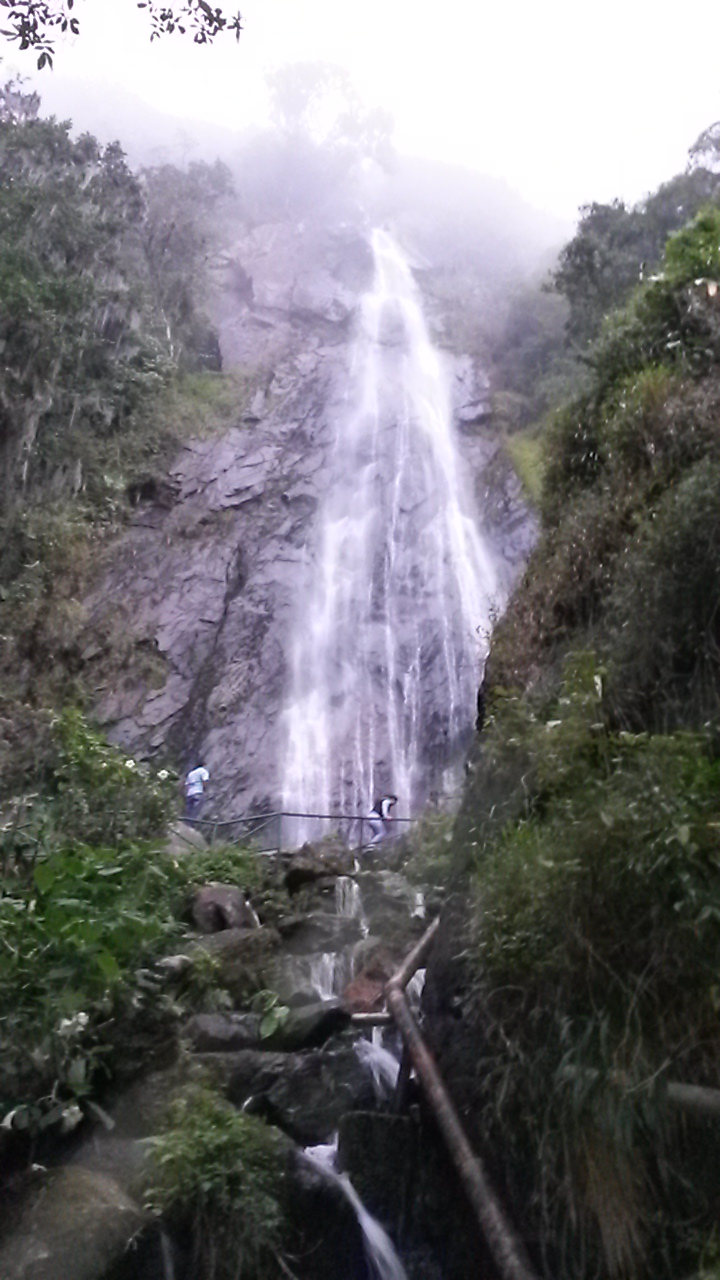
India Caru Waterfall

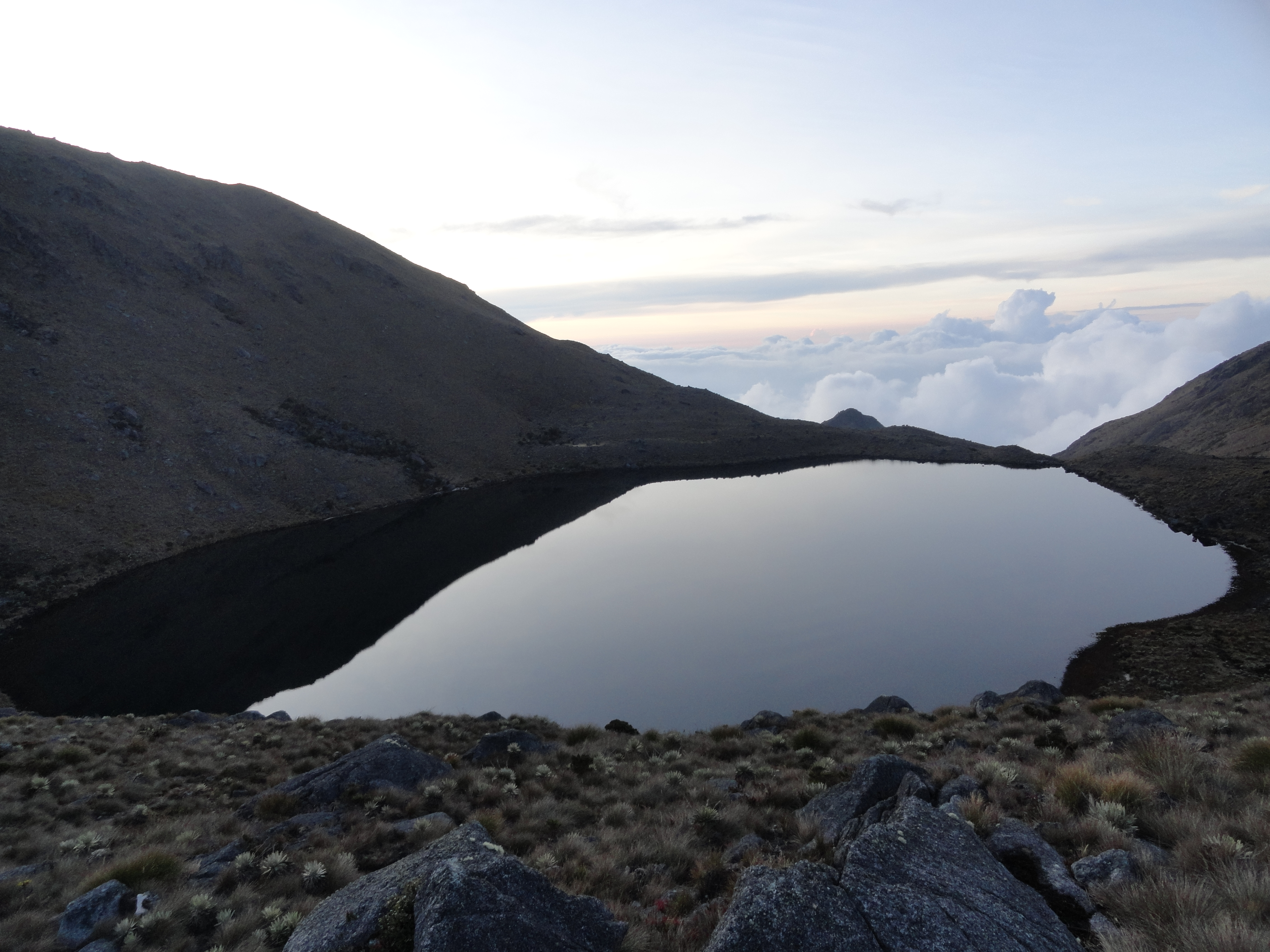
Laguna Grande

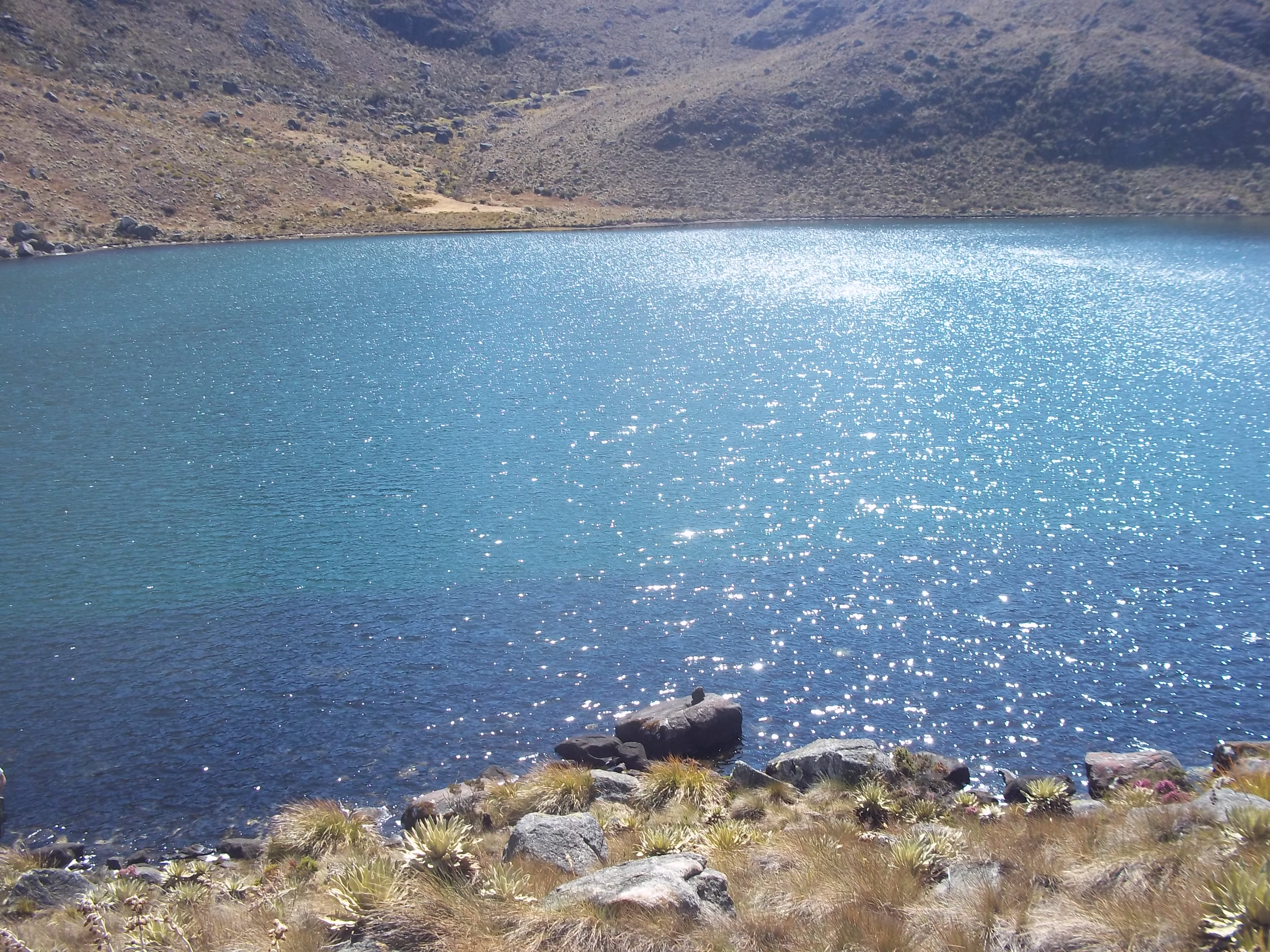

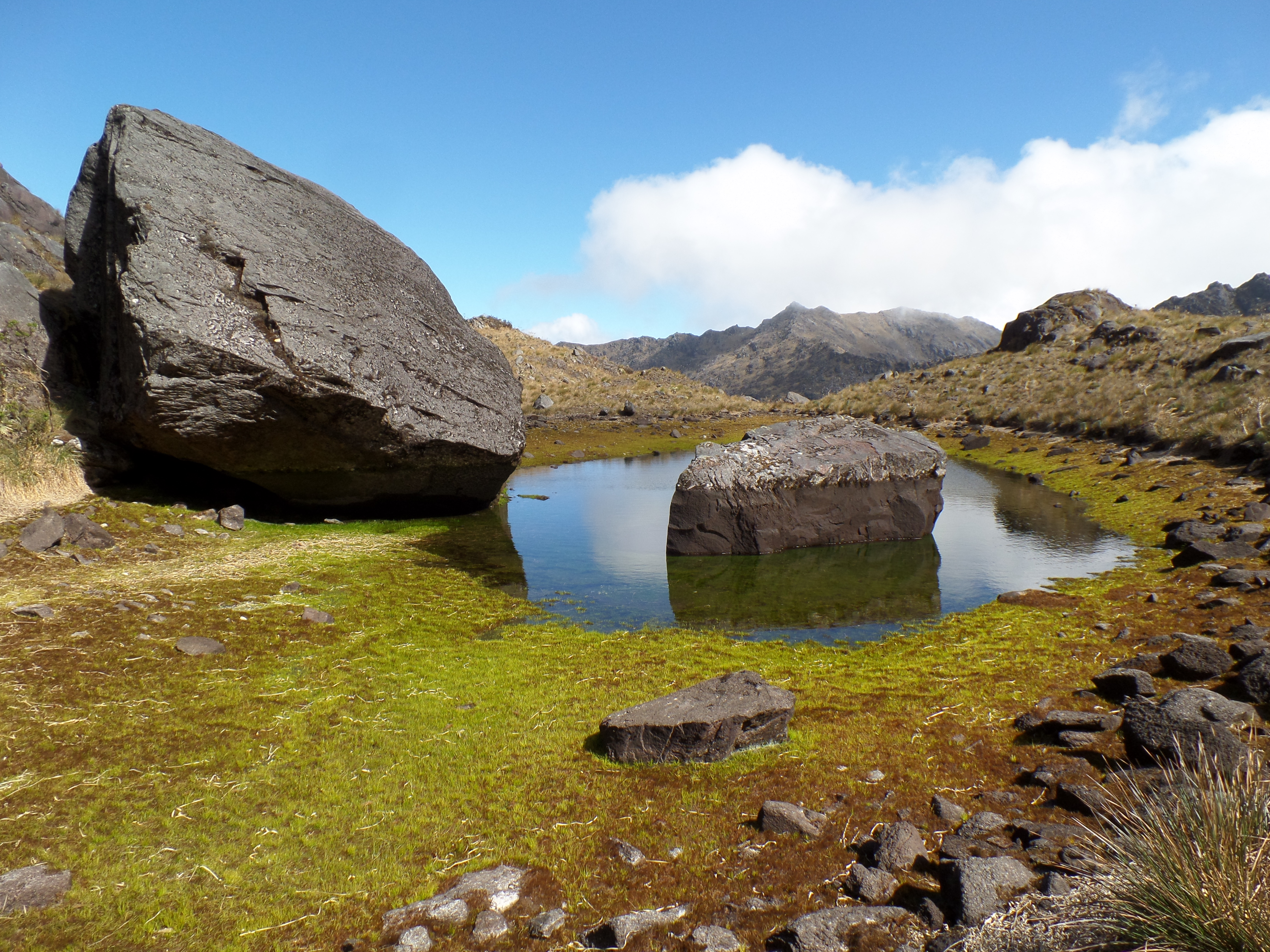

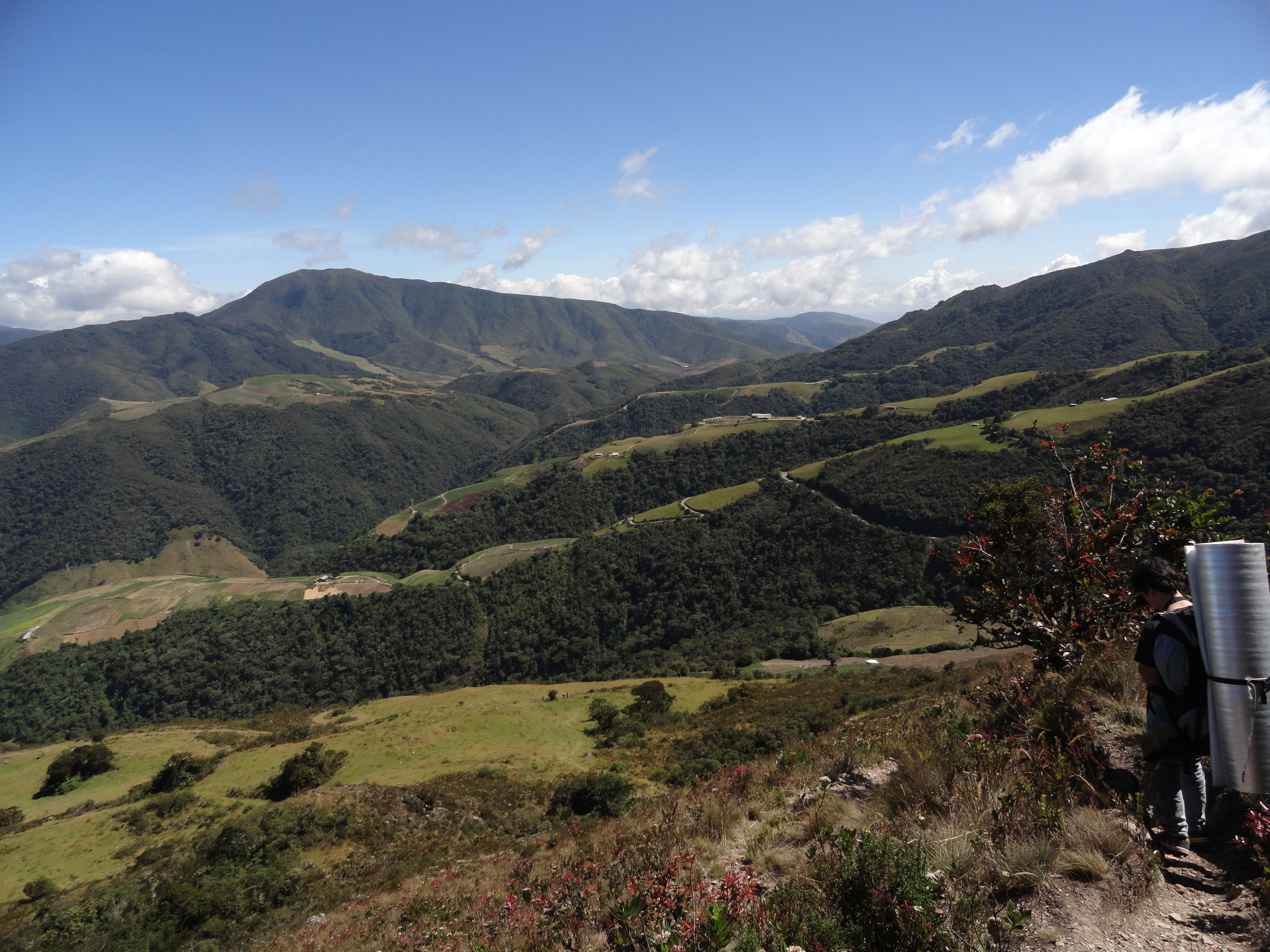
Mountains

== See also ==
- List of national parks of Venezuela
- Canaima National Park
