= Yacambú National Park =

National park in Venezuela

Yacambú National Park Parque Nacional Yacambú
- IUCN category II (national park)
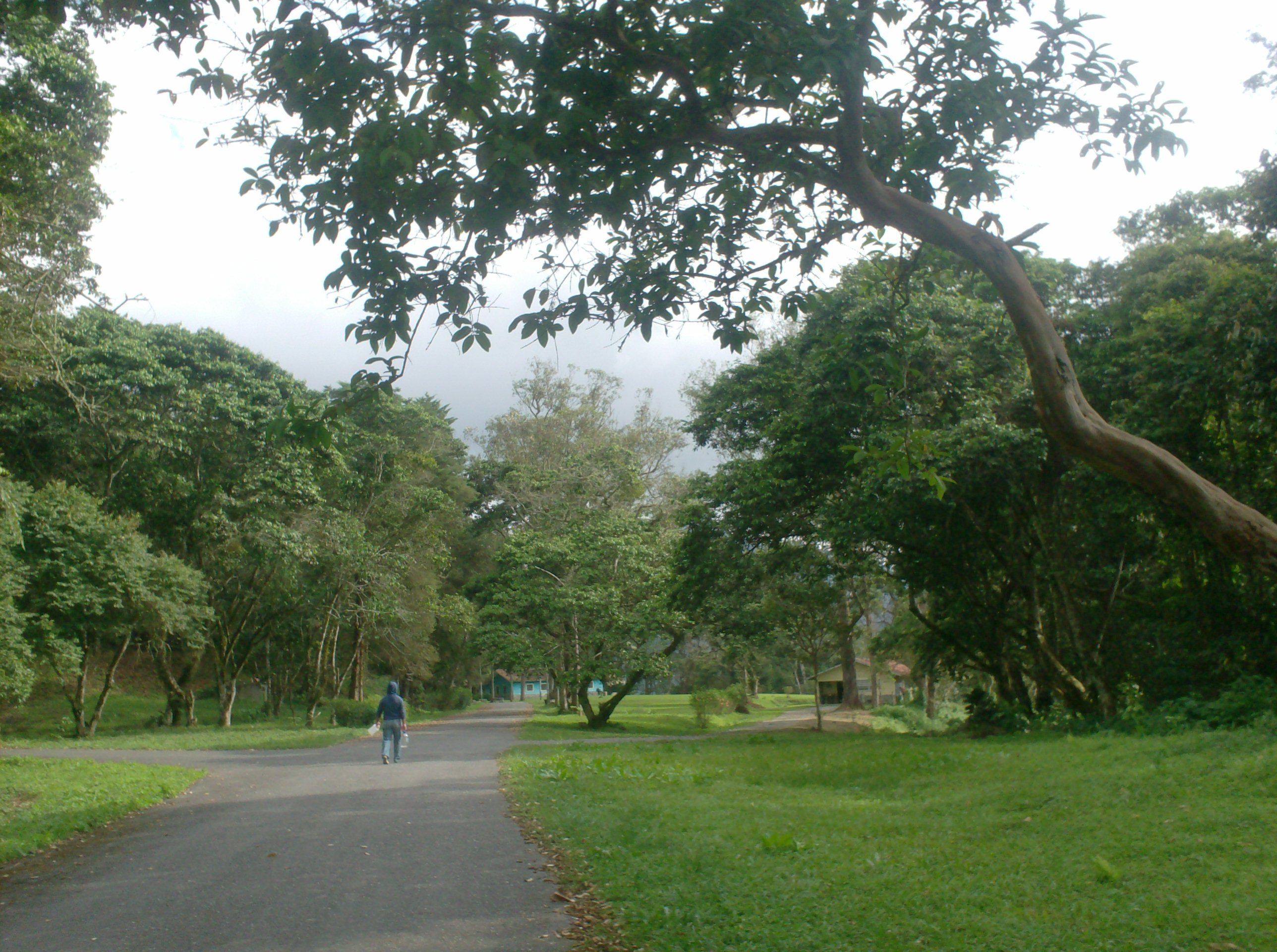

- Location within Venezuela
- Location: Venezuela
- Coordinates: 9°38′N 69°40′W
- Area: 146 km^{2} (56 sq mi)
- Established: June 12, 1962

The Yacambú National Park (Spanish: Parque nacional Yacambú) is a protected area with national park status in the South American country of Venezuela. It is located in the south of the Lara State, on the southern slope of the Portuguesa Mountain Range, which forms part of the mountain foothills of the Andes Mountains. It was created in 1962 with the purpose of protecting part of the Yacambú river basin, whose waters will feed the reservoir José María Ochoa Pilé, an ambitious project still under construction. The reservoir is of vital importance for water supply in the city of Barquisimeto and for economic development in the dry valleys of Quibor, where there is a protected area of sustainable use for agricultural purposes.

It has a humid cloud forest vegetation in its highest parts, where trees such as bucare, araguaney and oak predominate. There are also 14% of the orchids known in the country, that is, about 60 species.

Presence of mammals such as the araguato monkey, the deer matacan and caramerudo, cachicamo, the honey bear, among the birds stands the guacharaca, and snakes like the Viperinae.

== Gallery ==
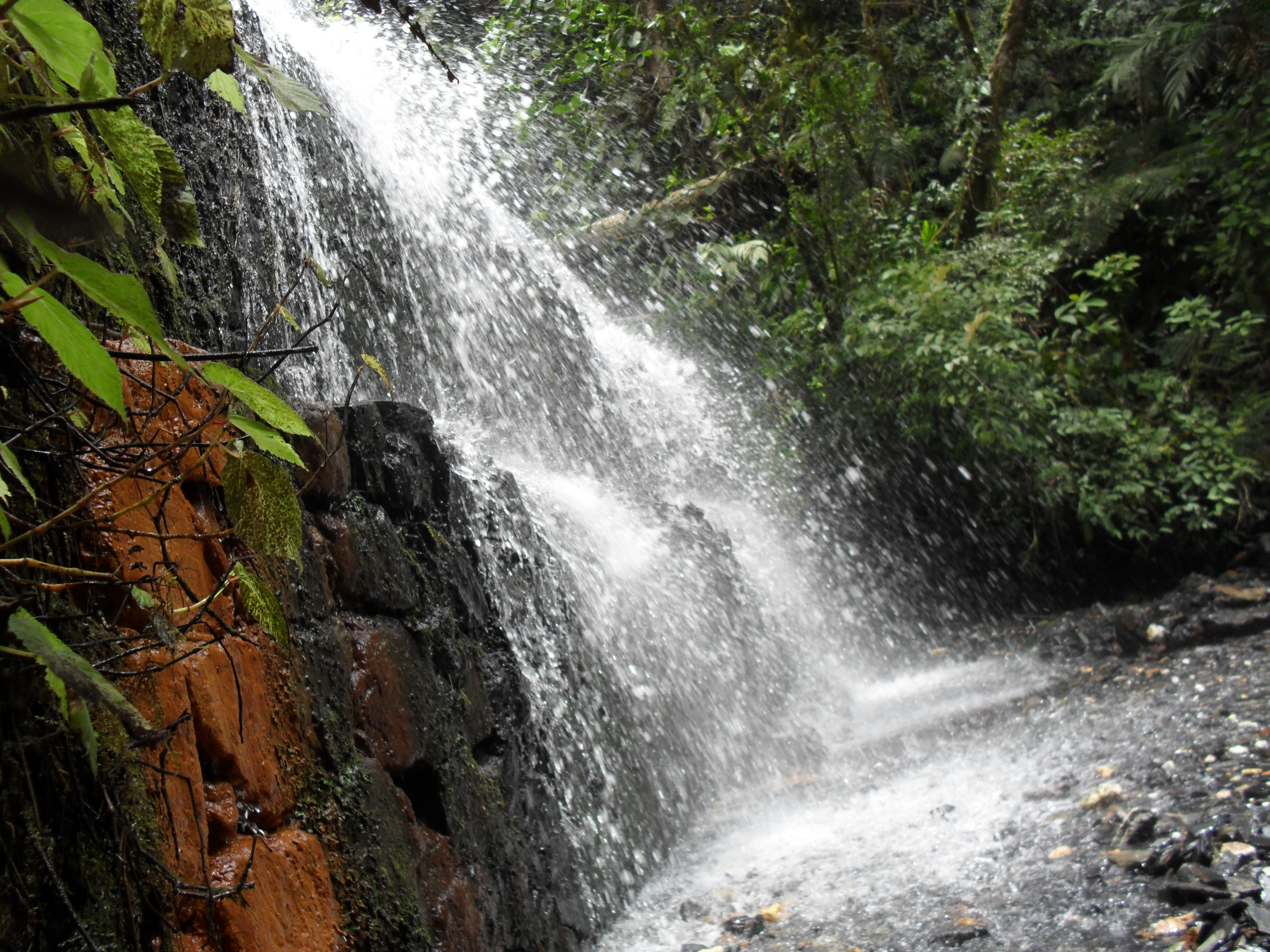

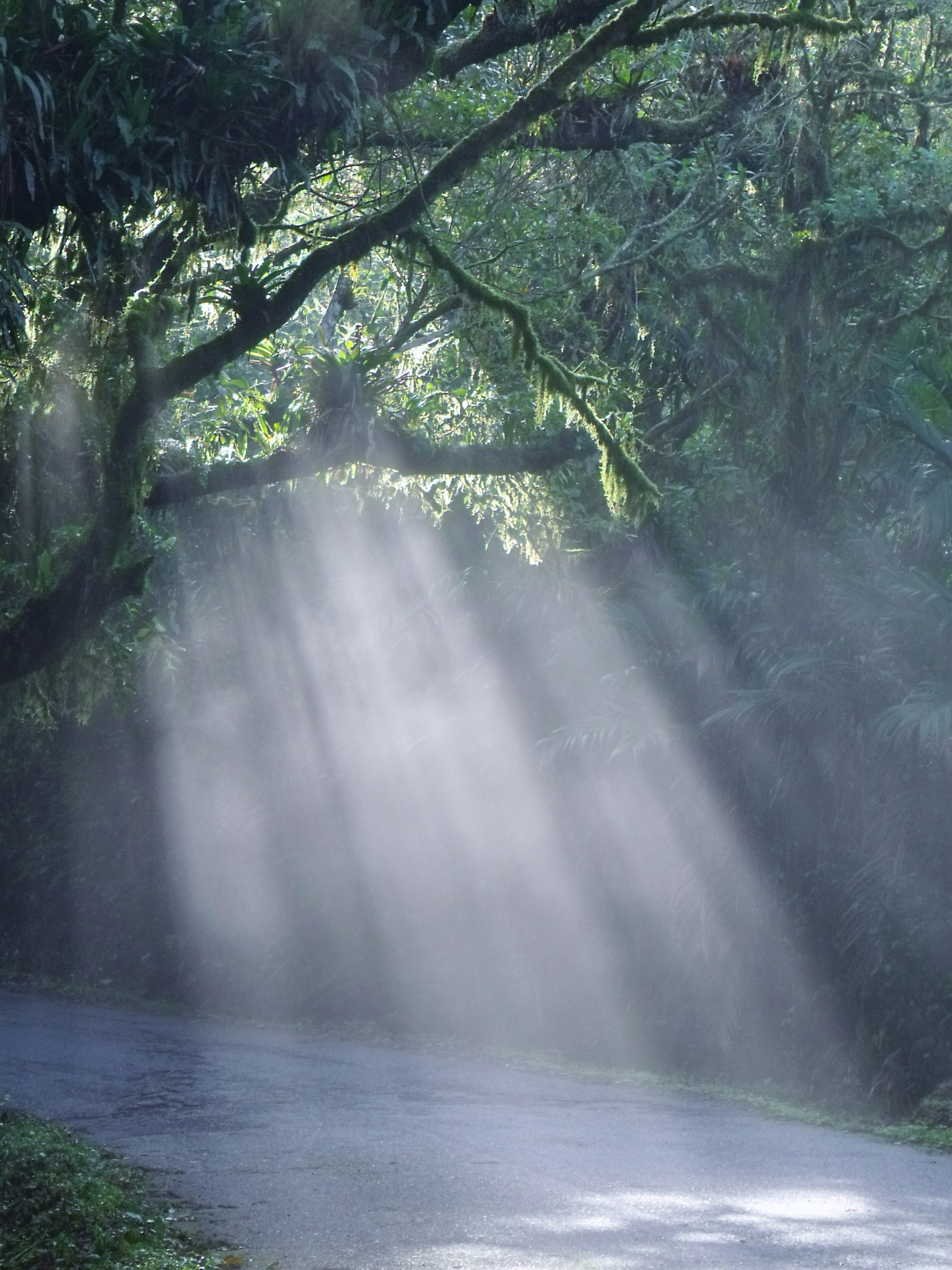

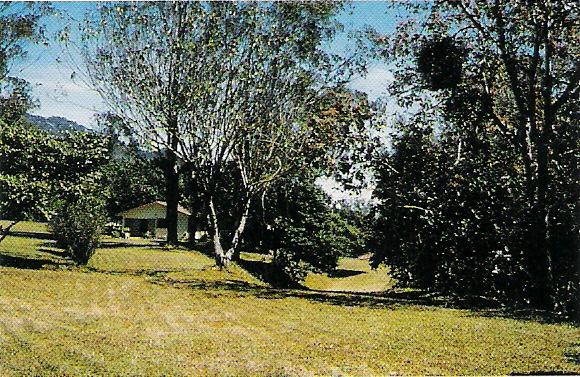

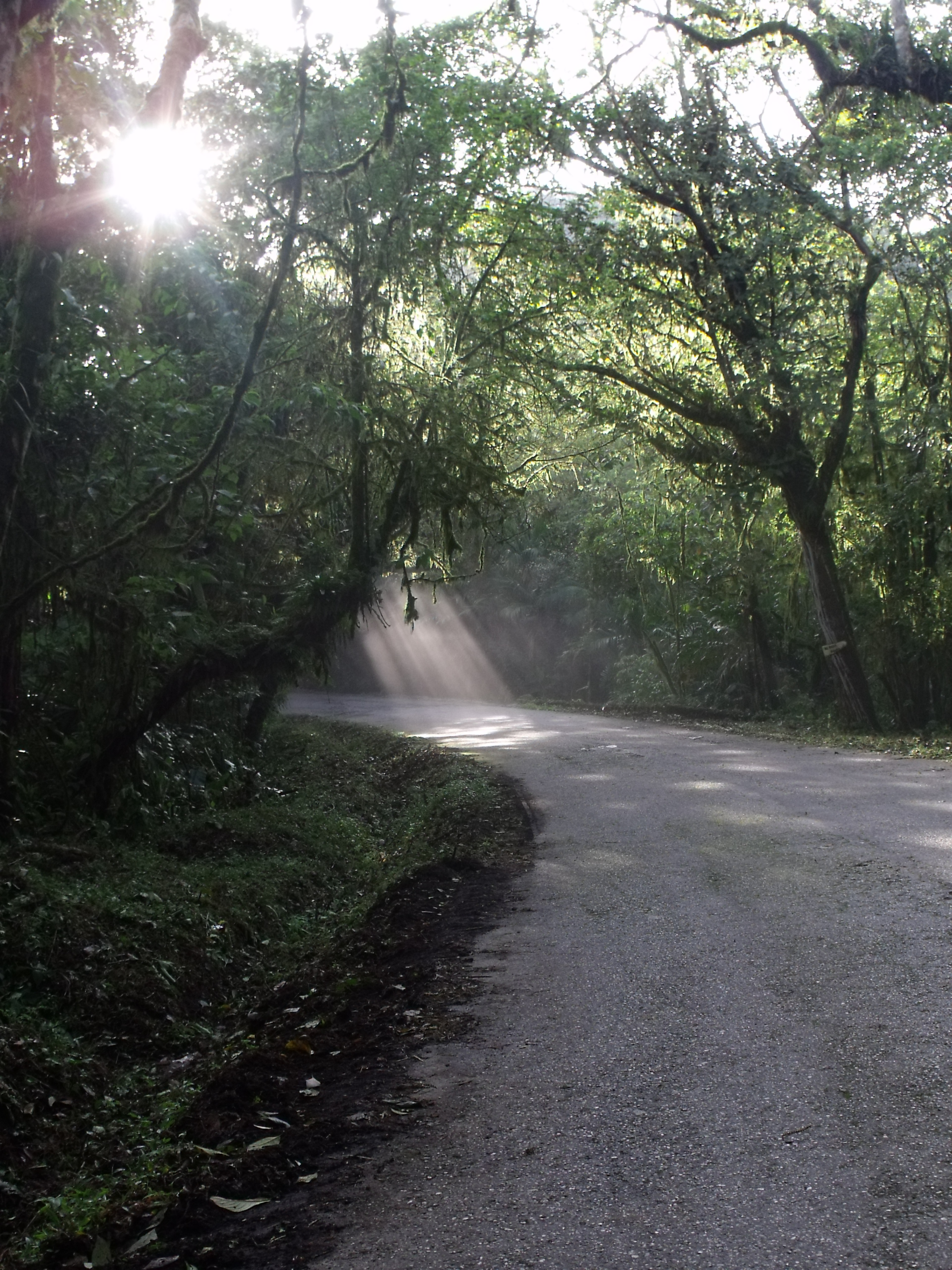

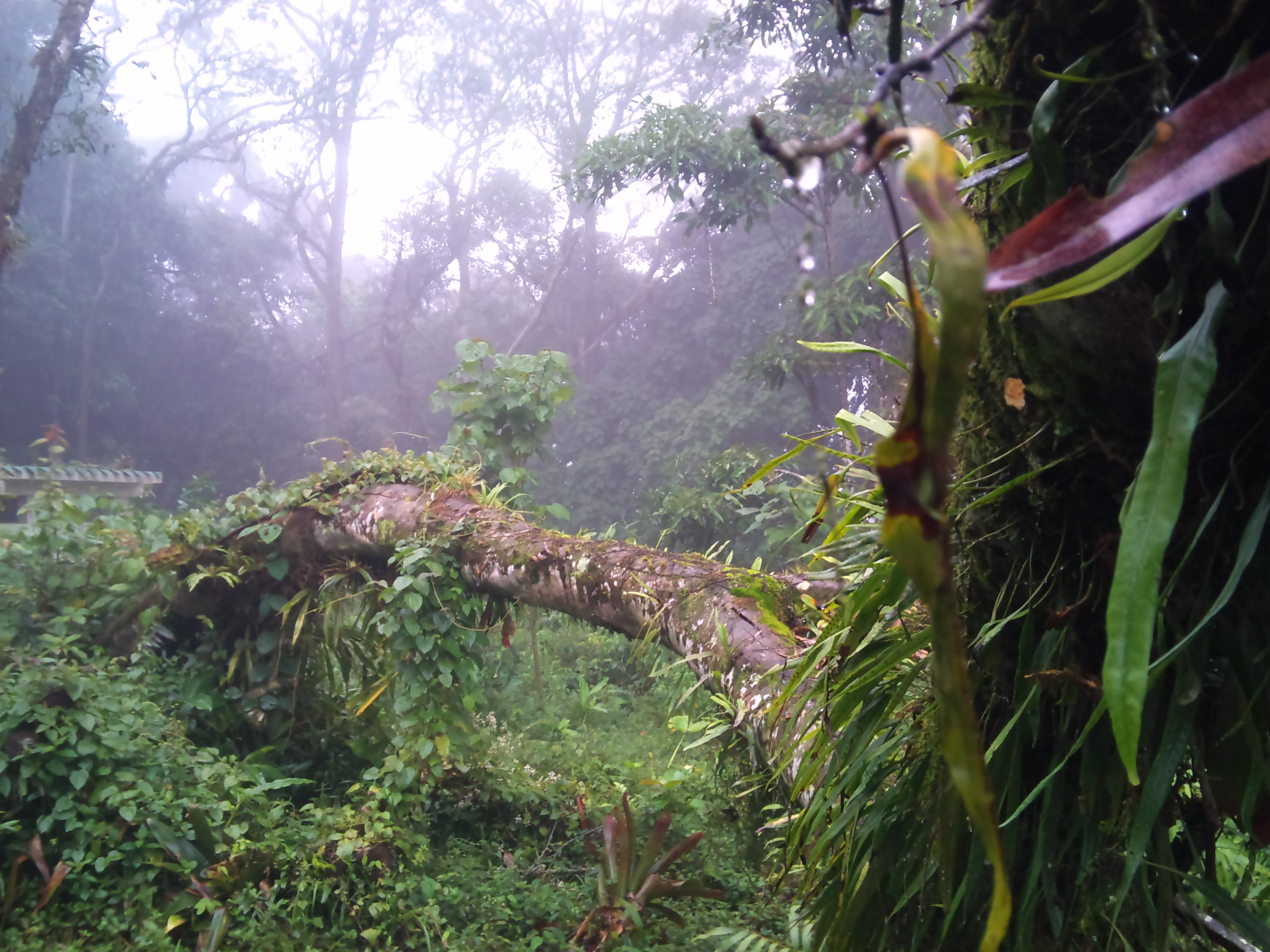

== See also ==
- List of national parks of Venezuela
- Morrocoy National Park
