= Tamá Massif =

Group of mountains in South America

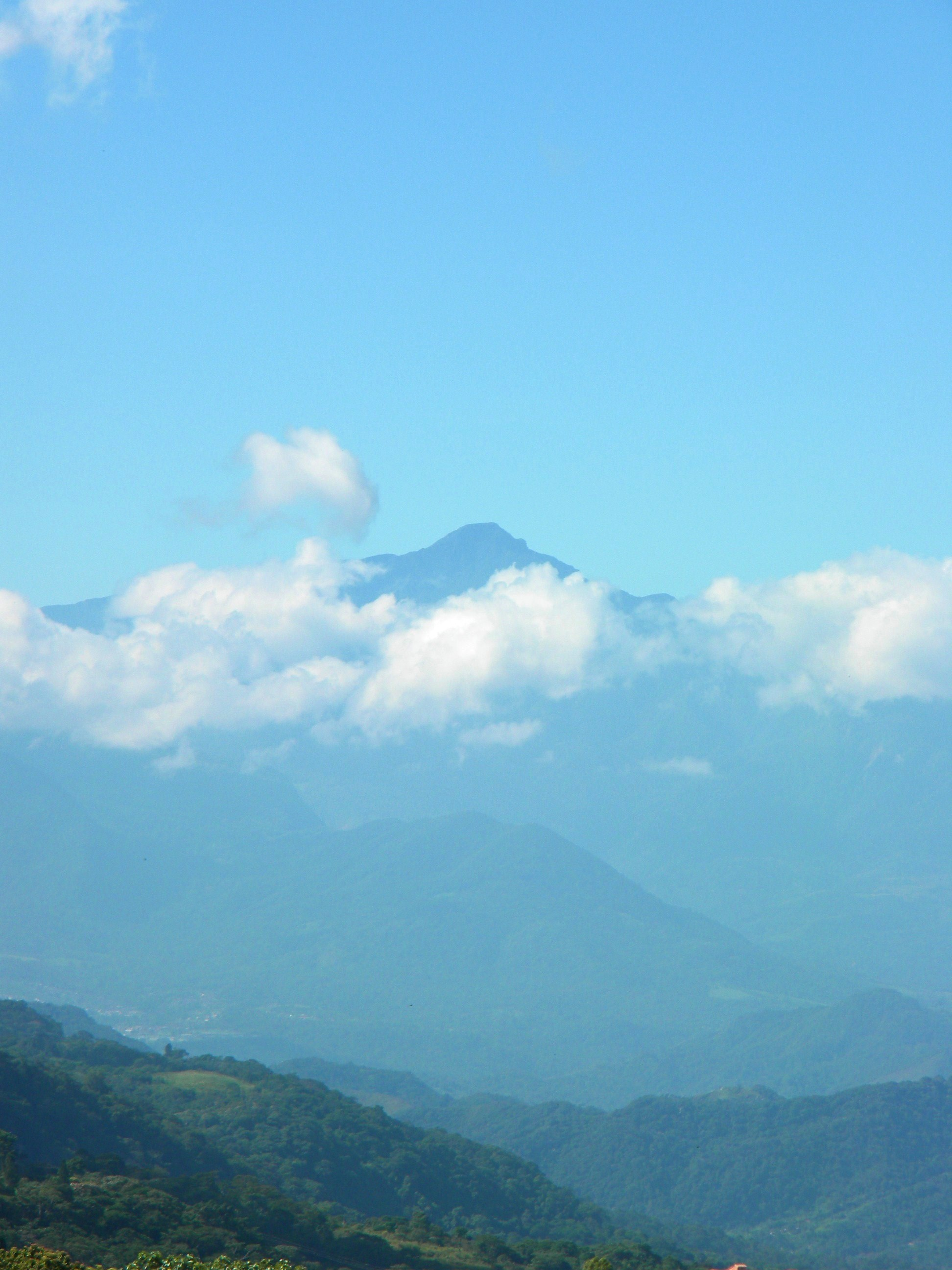
- El Tamá viewed from San Cristóbal, Táchira

Highest point
- Elevation: 3,613 m (11,854 ft)
- Coordinates: 7.427°N 72.293°W

Naming
- Native name: Macizo del Tamá (Spanish)

Geography
- Location within Venezuela
- Parent range: Cordillera Oriental (Colombia)

The Tamá Massif (Spanish: Macizo del Tamá) is a group of mountains on the border between Colombia and Venezuela to the south of Lake Maracaibo. It contains evergreen rainforest and cloud forest at the lower levels, and páramos (high moors) at the highest levels.

== Location ==
The Tamá is a prolongation of the Cordillera Oriental of the Colombian Andes. It is separated from the Cordillera de Mérida in the Venezuelan Andes by the Táchira depression, which more than 50 million years ago was a strait that connected Lake Maracaibo with the Orinoco basin. Elevations range from 320 to 3,329 metres (1,050 to 10,922 ft). Average annual temperature is 25 °C (77 °F). Average annual rainfall is 2,300 millimetres (91 in). The Tamá National Natural Park in Colombia and the El Tamá National Park in Venezuela protect parts of the Tamá Massif. The two parks together form a protected area of 1,390 km^{2} (540 sq mi).

== Geography ==
The Tamá massif is a set of folded mountain ranges with extremely steep topography. It contains the El Tamá páramos (high moors) at an elevation of 3,320 metres (10,890 ft), Cerro El Cobre at 3,613 metres (11,854 ft) and Cerro Judío at 3,372 metres (11,063 ft). The mountains are mainly of limestone or sandstone rock, typical of the Guiana Shield. The Tamá National Natural Park contains an 820-metre-high (2,690 ft) waterfall one of the world's highest. The páramos give rise to rivers such as the Carapo, Chiquito, Quinimarí, Quite, Burguita, Burga, Nula, Nulital, Sarare, Cutufí, Oirá, Frío and Negro, which drain into the Orinoco basin or into Lake Maracaibo. The Táchira River, which drains into Lake Maracaibo, forms part of the border between Colombia and Venezuela.

== Environment ==
Tamá has four types of natural environments: tropical rainforest, sub-Andean forest, Andean forest and páramo. The forests are included in the Venezuelan Andes montane forests ecoregion, which also covers the Venezuelan Andean cordillera. The vegetation between 800 and 1,800 metres (2,600 and 5,900 ft) is dense evergreen rainforest of medium height with two or three arboreal strata. There is a well-developed understory and many epiphytes. Forest species include the colorful Lagenanthus princeps. In the páramos the plant species are of the genera Jamesonia, Oreobulus, Castilleja, Gentiana, Halenia, Pinguicula, Utricularia, Castratella and Vaccinium.

Mammals include the spectacled bear (Tremarctos ornatus), tapir, lowland paca (Cuniculus paca), anteater and ocelot (Leopardus pardalis). The endemic wood sprite gracile opossum (Gracilinanus dryas) and Luis Manuel's tailless bat (Anoura luismanueli) are found in both the Andean Cordillera and the Tamá Massif. Restricted range bird species in the Tamá massif include Táchira antpitta (Grallaria chthonia), hooded antpitta (Grallaricula cucullata) and Venezuelan wood quail (Odontophorus columbianus). Tamá harlequin frog and Helena's marsupial frog are endemic to the Páramo de Tamá.

== Sources ==
- Bonaccorso, Elise, Northern South America: Northwestern Venezuela into Colombia, WWF: World Wildlife Fund
- El Tamá, Ministry of People's Power for Ecosocialism and Water, archived from the original on 2016-08-11
- "El Tamá", Parques y Monumentos Nacionales de Venezuela, Parques Nacionales de Venezuela
- La Marca, E.; Ardila-Robayo, M.C.; Rueda, J.V. (2004), "Gastrotheca helenae", IUCN Red List of Threatened Species, 2004, IUCN: e.T54558A11167366, doi:10.2305/IUCN.UK.2004.RLTS.T54558A11167366.en
- La Marca, E.; García-Pérez, J.E. (2004), "Atelopus tamaense", IUCN Red List of Threatened Species, 2004, IUCN: e.T54558A11167366, doi:10.2305/IUCN.UK.2004.RLTS.T54558A11167366.en
- Naturaleza y Ciencia del Parque Nacional Natural Tamá (in Spanish), Parques Nacionales Naturales de Colombia, archived from the original on 22 July 2011
- Parque Nacional Natural Tamá (in Spanish), Parques Nacionales Naturales de Colombia, archived from the original on 22 July 2011
- Turismo: Parque Nacional Natural Tamá (in Spanish), El municipio de Herrán
