= Quinimarí River =

River in northwestern Venezuela

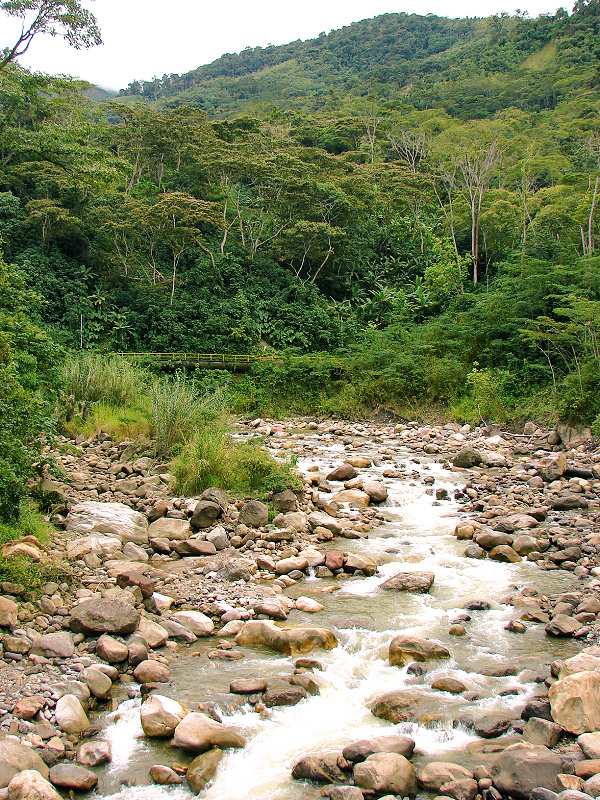
- The river at Río Chiquito

- Mouth location in Venezuela
- Native name: Rio Quinimarí (Portuguese)

Location
- Country: Venezuela

Physical characteristics
- Mouth
  - coordinates: 7°40′16″N 72°14′56″W

Basin features
- River system: Uribante River

The Quinimarí River (Spanish: Rio Quinimarí) is a river in northwestern Venezueala.

The Quinimarí River rises in the Tamá Massif. It drains the southern slope off the Táchira depression. It is located in the municipality of Córdoba in the state of Táchira, Venezuela. It joins the Torbes River and then flows into the Uribante River, a tributary of the Apure River, in the Orinoco basin. The Quinimarí basin holds extensive areas producing coffee and sugar cane, which are favored by the humid mountain climate of the area. The river is named after the "Quenemaríes" indigenous people that inhabited this part of the Venezuelan Andes.

Settlements on the river's banks include villages such as San Vicente de La Revancha, Río Chiquito, La Petrolea, Estación Santa Ana and Santa Ana del Táchira, capital of the municipality. La Petrolea on the left bank is where oil exploration began in Venezuela in 1878 after a strong earthquake devastated the area and released the so-called "black gold" in the Quebrada La Alquitrana, a tributary just 30 metres (98 ft) from the Quinimarí River. Oil still flows from the subsoil in small quantities, a factor that limits the use of the river as a tourist attraction.

== See also ==
- List of rivers of Venezuela

== Sources ==
- "El Tamá", Parques y Monumentos Nacionales de Venezuela, Parques Nacionales de Venezuela, archived from the original on 2017-05-08
- Hernandez, Armando; Campero, Alfredo; Moreno, Fidel (1983), Region Natural 7A: Depresion del Tachira (PDF) (in Spanish), Caracas: Sistemas Ambientales Venezolanos, archived from the original (PDF) on 2017-04-23
