= La Grita (river) =

River

Coordinates: 8°22′11″N 72°24′23″W

La Grita is a river that partly runs along the Colombian-Venezuelan border. A 1919 source noted that there was a very promising copper mine on the river, at Seporuco, but that it was at such high altitude that it could not be developed. It was navigable from the port of Guamas by boats and canoes.

The towns of La Grita and La Fria are on the river. The towns of Boca de Grita, Venezuela, and Puerto Santander, Colombia, are at the mouth of La Grita River, where it flows into the Zulia River.

In 1888 a railroad line was built between La Fria and El Brazo, and an international bridge was built in 1926. In 1926 plans to extend the Tachira Railway from Oropé Station to the river were noted.

Parque El Pinar overlooks the river.

== See also ==
- Táchira River
- Táchira Depression
- General Juan Pablo Peñaloza National Park
