= Cordylancistrus torbesensis =

Conservation status
- Endangered (IUCN 3.1)

Scientific classification
- Kingdom: Animalia
- Phylum: Chordata
- Class: Actinopterygii
- Order: Siluriformes
- Family: Loricariidae
- Genus: Cordylancistrus
- Species: C. torbesensis

Binomial name
- Cordylancistrus torbesensis (Schultz, 1944)

Synonyms
- Pseudancistrus torbesensis Schultz, 1944

Species of catfish

Cordylancistrus torbesensis is a species of freshwater ray-finned fish belonging to the family Loricariidae, the suckermouth armoured catfishes, and the subfamily Hypostominae, the suckermouth catfishes. This catfish is endemic to Venezuela where it occurs in the headwaters of the Torbes River in the states of Táchira and Mérida. It is known to occur in just three streams. It can be found in streams with transparent water, moderate to strong flow, and a substrate of stone, gravel, or sand. This species reaches a standard length of 6.5 cm (2.6 in). The International Union for Conservation of Nature has assessed C. torbesensis as Endangered due to its restricted distribution and the threats to its habitat from agriculture and urbanisation.
