= Pregonero =

Town in Táchira State, Venezuela

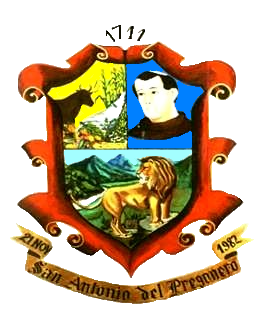
- Coat of arms

- Location within Venezuela
- Coordinates: 08°01′22″N 71°45′53″W
- Time zone: UTC−4 (VET)

Pregonero is a town in Táchira State, Venezuela. It is the administrative centre for Uribante Municipality. Pregonero is located high in the Andes Mountains at an elevation of 1,327 m. on the banks of the Uribante River.

Traditionally, Pregonero was founded by Francisco de Borja y Mora in 1727 with settlers from La Grita, although there was already an indigenous village there.

== Geography ==
The town is located above the Uribante River on a river terrace which was formed in Pleistocene times. The climate is classified as tropical savanna with wet summers and dry winters. Annual rainfall is around 1,400 mm. Located nearby is the Uribante Caparo dam.

There are two large plazas, Bolivar Plaza located in front of the church of San Antonio de Padua and the Plaza Miranda in front of the church of Nuestra Señora del Carmen.

== Notable people ==
- Bartus Bartolomes
