= Santa Ana del Táchira =

San Ana del Táchira
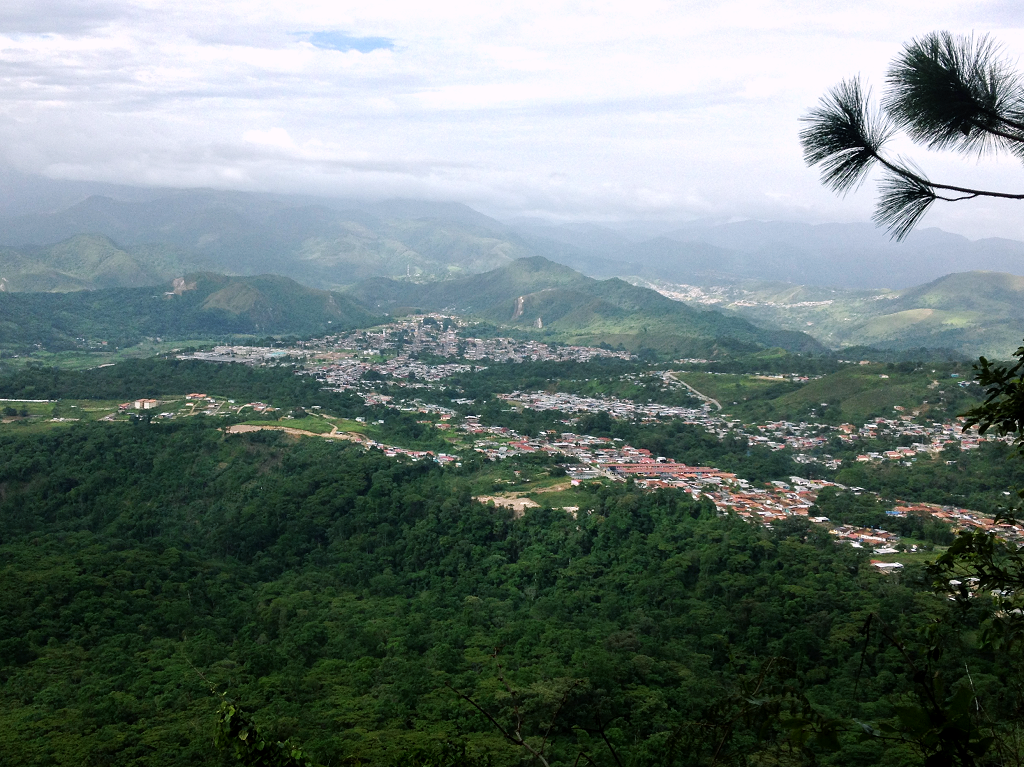

- Flag Coat of arms

- Location within Venezuela
- Coordinates: 7°38′43″N 72°16′33″W
- Country: Venezuela
- State: Táchira
- Municipality: Córdoba Municipality

Area
  - Total: 619 km^{2} (239 sq mi)
- Elevation: 807 m (2,648 ft)

Population (2013)
  - Total: 36,925
  - Density: 59.7/km^{2} (154/sq mi)
- Time zone: UTC−4 (VET)
- Postal code: 5051
- Area code: 0276
- Climate: Aw
- Website: cordoba-tachira.gob.ve

Santa Ana del Tachira is a town in Táchira, Venezuela, capital of Córdoba Municipality. It is located 810 meters above sea level on the banks of the Quinimarí River in the Andes. Founded in 1860 by Timoteo Chacon it is located south of San Cristóbal between the mountains and valleys of the foothills of the Tamá Massif. The town's past is preserved in some of its long streets, old houses, and colorful roofs with terracotta tiles.

== Geography ==
Cordoba municipality within Táchira.

It is located in the southwest of the state of Táchira, at the geographical coordinates 07º 38′ 43″ north latitude and 72° 16′ 33″ west longitude.

The city is linked with the rest of the country by road links to the cities of Barinas and San Cristóbal. It is an agricultural center dedicated mainly to coffee and vegetables, as well as commercial horticulture upstairs, in the lower areas grow crops corn and sugar. There are small industries engaged in the process of cleaning, drying, storage and marketing of coffee. It serves as administrative and support services to the surrounding agricultural communities. It is anticipated that in the future it will be functionally integrated in the conurbation San Cristobal, Táriba and Palmira.

In the area is located the Western Penitentiary.

== History ==
Timoteo Chacón founded the town of Santa Ana in honor of his eldest daughter ANA. Recorded in 1869 is a sale to Timoteo Chacón of the land in the future form of the Municipality Córdoba known today. This sale was granted by General Leopoldo Eugenio Machado (National Delegate of the Government, foreman of General Antonio Guzmán Blanco in 1869), the document does not mention the limits. This detail brought disastrous historical events since the boundaries were later altered and the consequences of fraud led to the murder of José Gregorio Villafane Q. to 1889.

According to information provided by Don Martín León in the year 1955, the sale of the land was for 1,750 pesos and legal limits were as follows:

"from the mouth of the creek Wren in the river Quinimarí, upstream of the creek until an equidistance line could be traced to the sources of the creek Uzateca, Uzateca downstream to its mouth in the river Quinimarí. Quinimarí downstream to find the mouth of the creek La Ratona, starting point ". This information is captured in a Proof of 1878 on the Principal Register of San Cristóbal, sales and exchanges, under number 136.

The official historian of Santa Ana is José Joaquín Villamizar Molina (born 1930). His works include Santa Ana del Táchira and Santa Ana Ciudad de mis Amores.

== Amenities ==
Santa Ana currently has two branches of Banco Bicentenario. It has a single high school. Bernabe Vivas with a student population of more than 2000 students. At night there is CCB high school Santa Ana with a population of 147 students. Its Director is the Lic. Ramon Roa E. In sports there is a football field with artificial turf. Biking is the second most popular sport. Therein lies the Club Lottery Tachira. And several Mountain Biking clubs, Maundy Thursday headed to San Vicente of Revenge. At a distance of approximately 40 km and 25 strong ascent from 800 m to 2900 m. Its main product is coffee. The distance to San Cristóbal is approximately 20 km on a good road.
