= Bartus Bartolomes =

Venezuelan artist

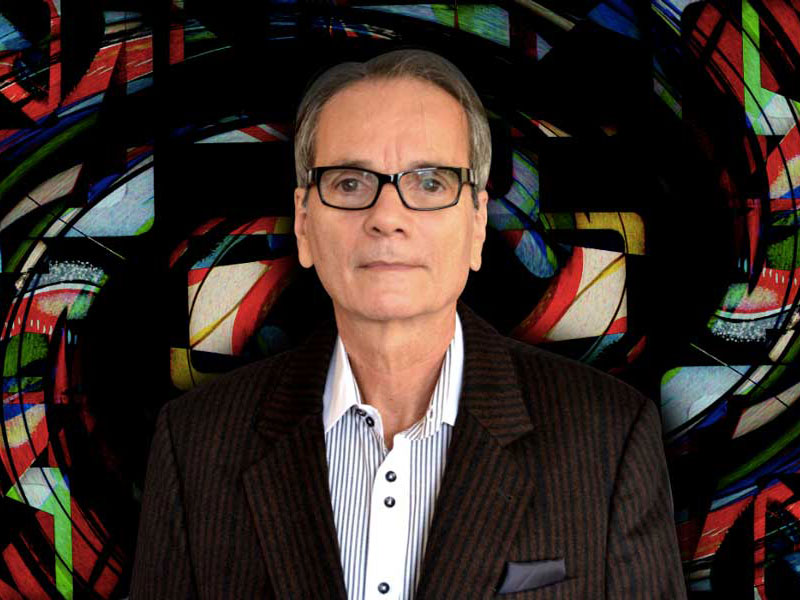
- Photo portrait of Bartus Bartolomes
- Born: Bartolomé Sanchez; 1950 (age 75–76); Pregonero, Táchira
- Education: University of Vincennes, Paris VIII, L'École Normale Superieur, Central University of Venezuela.

Bartolomé Sanchez, better known as Bartus Bartolomes, is an artist born in 1950 in the town of Pregonero, in the state of Táchira, Venezuela. He is currently based in Italy and France. Bartus creates using a wide range of mediums, including painting, drawing, caricature, photography, design, and even poetry. In 1969, he wrote "Kitsch Art", a manifesto promoting street artistic experimentalism.

== Life and education ==
Upon completing his secondary education at Colegio de la Salle in the city of San Cristóbal in Venezuela, where he held his first exhibition of paintings when he was 17 years old, Bartus traveled to Europe and lived in Paris from 1968 until 1974, participating in the student movement that generated the Mai 68, and attended the École Normale Supérieure, the École des Beaux Arts and the University of Vincennes, Paris VIII.

His family owned the Sanchez Pernia Estate, one of the largest coffee plantations in the country covering more than 90,000 hectares from 1898 up to the 1960s. However, the newly emerging governments from the 1960s began to expropriate the land.

In the expropriated lands, the government promoted and built the Uribante Caparo Hydroelectric Dam, a project that became detrimental to the eco-systems of three Venezuelan states: Táchira, Mérida and Barinas, decreasing the productivity of the traditionally cultivated areas, affecting the rivers, local plants and bird migrations because this area was a pathway or transit corridor used by migrating birds.

These expropriations and the negative effect they had on the environment he grew up in affected Bartus. He devoted his creativity to establishing links between art and water, and he promoted cultural events that highlight the consequences of human intervention on the environment such as environmental pollution and global warming.

In the early 1970s he published a new manifesto in San Francisco proclaiming Transpositionism: a search on new proposals as symbolic calligraphy, haiku and visual art from which he proposed the new denomination Graphi-kú, a combination between Haiku and Graphic.

In the mid-1970s, he obtained a degree in International Studies (Diplomacy) from the Central University in Caracas.

In the late 1970s and early 1980s, he was involved with the group Zeta International promoters of the New Visuality or Poesia Visiva with Carlo Marcello Conti, Lamberto Pignotti, Adriano Spatola, Gerard Jaschke, Eugenio Miccini, Luciana Arbizzani, T. Blittersdorf, Graziella Borghesi, and Erio Sughi among many others.

In the mid-1980s, linked to a diplomatic post, he lived in India and China. He exhibited work in New Delhi. Later he studied calligraphy in Beijing, China, and Bantu art in Libreville, Gabon.

Bartus returned to Europe in the mid-1990s and began his project on Global Rights of drinkable water, looking to motivate the international community in the creation of large water caves to fill in periods of drought at 65 countries experiencing shortages of fresh water seasonally and with more intensity in recent years.

== Work ==
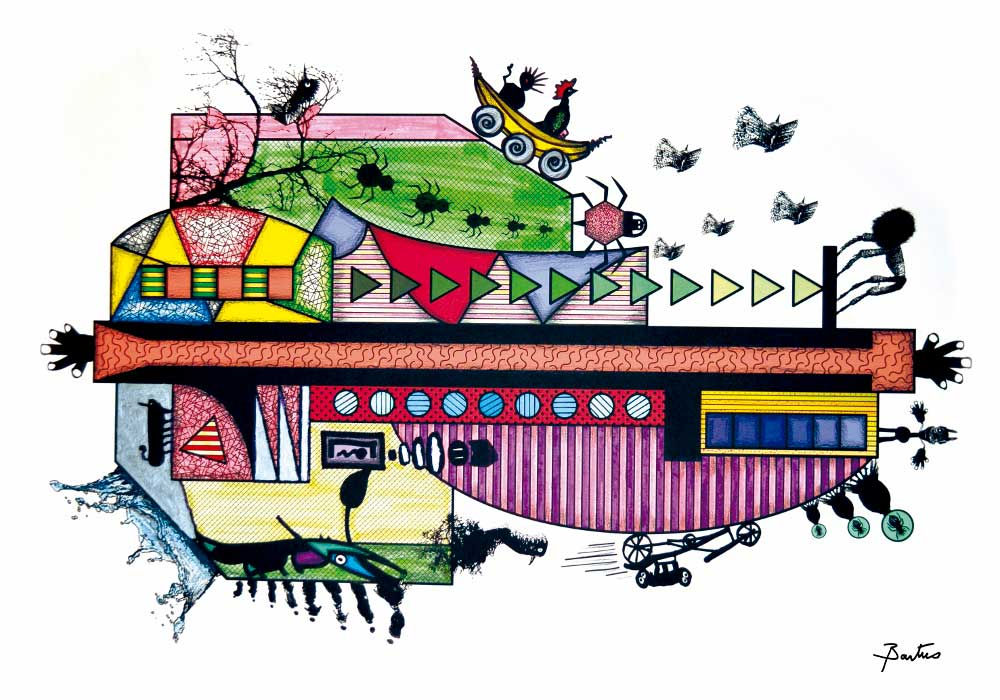
Mix Media, Ink & Acrylic. Dimension: 1 m x 1.40 m.

As told by French writer Gérard-Georges Lemaire:

The artwork of Bartus Bartolomes transpires in an association of heart and mind that fuels his passion for art in all of its expressions. His creative endeavors are not static as though they might appear, rather they suggest a movement suspended between reality and representation of our contemporary society as it relates to social and geographical diversities, ethnical conflicts, political and cultural ambiguities, that includes a metaphysical research of humane solutions which dislocate or denounce the aesthetical camouflage of contemporary art.

The originality of his approach resides in the interior logics, which animate Bartus the artist. These interior reflections of the artist generate a dynamic that leads him to expand his energetic connections with a geographical territory combining the joyful freedom of his feelings with the ample variety of intellectual motivations that when joined in his process, never jeopardize the wholeness of his approach."

One of the main motivational targets implicit in his graphic creations has been to show, project, or portray his own reflections of what it means to survive as an artist who creates and produces in a cultural environment where civilization, the destruction of natural resources and contamination go hand in hand on a day by day basis, unstoppable, everyday.

— Gérard-George Lemaire, "Les masques et la plume de Bartus Bartolomes", visuelimage.com (12/07/2012)

Carlo Marcello Conti, art critic, writes:

The artist juxtaposes exotic influences from as far as Africa, Asia, Europe, South and North America to articulate his discovery of asymmetrically iconography art contrasts between East and West, expanding metaphoric visions, transcending barriers of time in the plastics imagery and converging into a new archaeology of meta-signs and poetry.

— Carlo Marcello Conti, "Bartus Bartolomes", https://www.miaminewmediafestival.com/bartus-bartolomes-2017/ (2017)

== Exhibitions ==
Bartus Bartolomes has participated in numerous exhibitions:

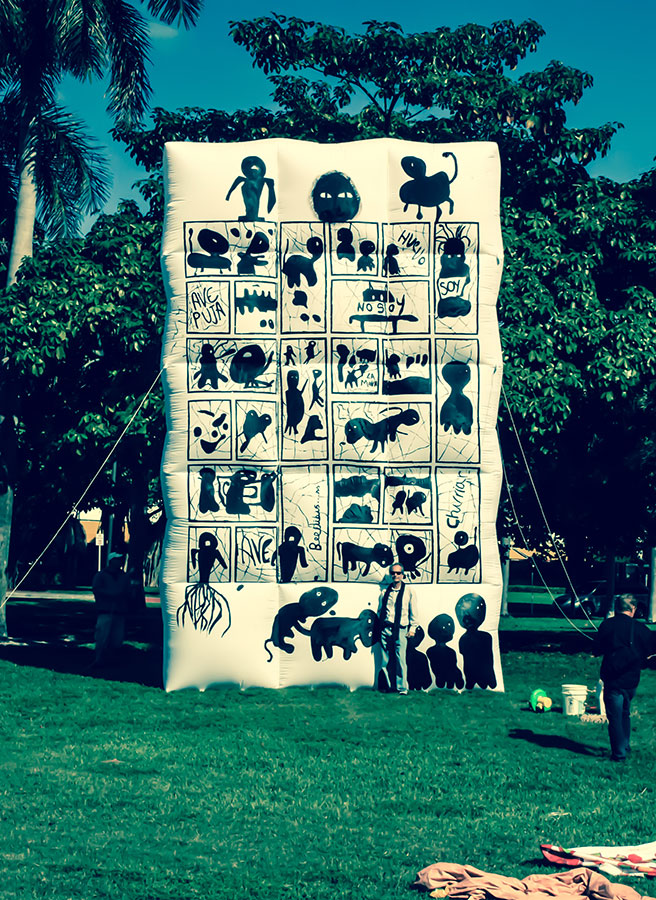
Air Sculpture. Dimension 8 m x 4 m. Installation. Bay Front Park, Miami, Florida. USA.

=== 2011 ===
- Giants in the City, Monumental Sculpture Project, Bayfront Park, Miami, United States.
- Arte Padova 22ª Edizione. Padua, Italy.
- World Monuments Fund Gallery, New York City, United States.
- Latinamente Primo Piano LivinGallery. Lecce, Italy.
- Art Verona Art Fair. Verona, Italy.
- Art Platform Art Fair. Los Angeles, United States.

=== 2012 ===
- The Office Contemporary Art Gallery, Rome, Italy.
- 13th Annual day of the Dead Exhibition at SomArts Cultural Center. San Francisco, United States
- Graffito International Art Exhibition. Miami, United States
- One Hundred Twenty Eight Gallery. Lower East Village, New York City, United States
- YAA Museum Broward County Library. Miami, United States
- Kavachnina Contemporary Art Gallery, Wynwood, Florida, United States
- Area 24 Art Gallery. Naples, Italy
- BluorG Gallery, Bari, Italy
- Anonymous Gallery/Casa de Empeño Gallery. Mexico City, Mexico
- The Art Link Gallery, Wynwood, Miami, United States.
- Zona Maco. Mexico Arte Contemporaneo. Anonymous Gallery. Mexico
- Arte America. Irreversible Art Projects. Miami Beach Convention Center. Miami, United States
- Museo di Matino. Magliano, Italy
- Burning Man Passport Proposal with Domingo de Lucia. Black Rock City & Desert. Nevada, United States

=== 2013 ===
- Art Monaco. Monteolivetto Gallery. Nice, France
- Snug Harbor Art Lab. Staten Island, New York, United States
- 41st Salon Antibes. & Modern Art Fair. April 20 – May 6. Port Vauban, Antibes, France
- Smart Aix-en-Provence Art Fair. May 2 – May 6. Monteolivetto Gallery. France
- Art of the Prom. June 7–9. Promenade des Anglais, Nice, France
- Ateneo del Táchira. San Cristóbal, Táchira, Venezuela
- Biblioteca Civica di Feltre, Belluno, Italy
- Global Art Gallery. Noicàttaro, Italy
- Miami International Art Fair. Miami, United States
- MIA Encore Aboard Sea Fair. April 4 – April 7. Miami, United States

=== 2014 ===
- Nest Gen Eco Art Project. Florida International University & Frost Museum Gardens. Miami, United States.
- Art Basel Week, Miami, United States
- PARImageS, Galerie Etienne des Causans & Monteolivetto Gallery. Photography, December. Paris, France
- ART3F MULHOUSE, November 28 – November 30. France
- Premio Napoli per L’Arte Contemporaneo.
- Base Navale Molosiglio. Naples, Italy. & Galleria Monteolivetto;
- Florida International University. Honors College, Hall. Miami, United States
- Galleria Car

=== 2015 ===
- Kontempo Art. January. Coral Gables, Miami, United States.
- Fiera di Bologna. Campanotto Art Books. January 28 – February 1. Bologna, Italy
- The Arquitecture of Love Brooklyn Bridge Light Art Project
- Gender Equality Proposal. New Delhi, India
- Art for Water. Itinerary Public Project
- Biennial of Exile and Refugees Art
- DWN TWN Art Days. 4th Annual Celebration. September 11 – September 13. Bayfront Park, Miami, United States.
- Bergamo Arte. November. Bergamo. Italy
- Miami Book Fair. Plunging Ourselves. Indiana, United States
- ICL Studio. December 4 – December 7. Art Week Basel. Wynwood, Miami, United States

== Publications ==
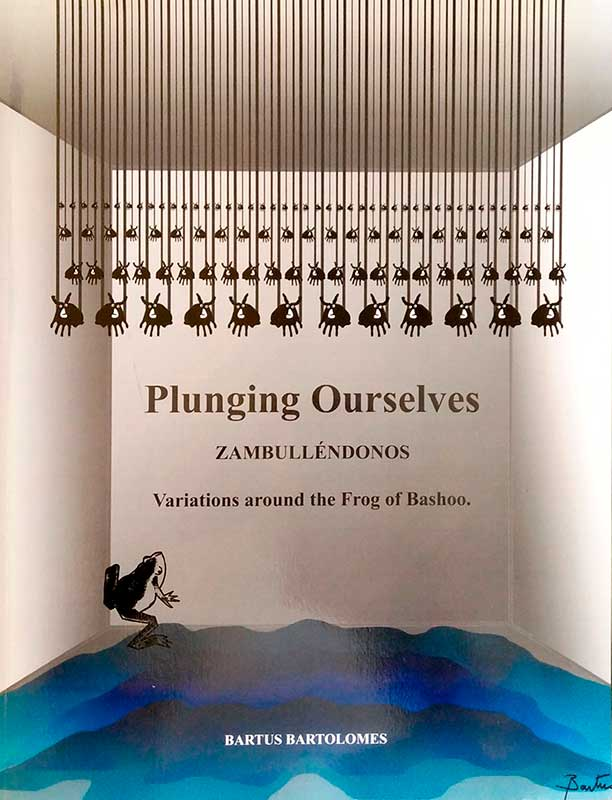

- Sushi Poems, 2008.
- La Saliva del Gorilla, 2010.
- The horns of the rhinoceros, 2011.
- Birds Birdy Birding, 2012.
- Il diluvio è una cicala con le labbra azzurre, 2012.
- Nightmare in New York, 2014.
- Plunging Ourselves, 2015.
