= Tamá National Natural Park =

National park in Colombia

Parque Nacional Natural Tamá
- Tamá National Natural Park
- IUCN category II (national park)
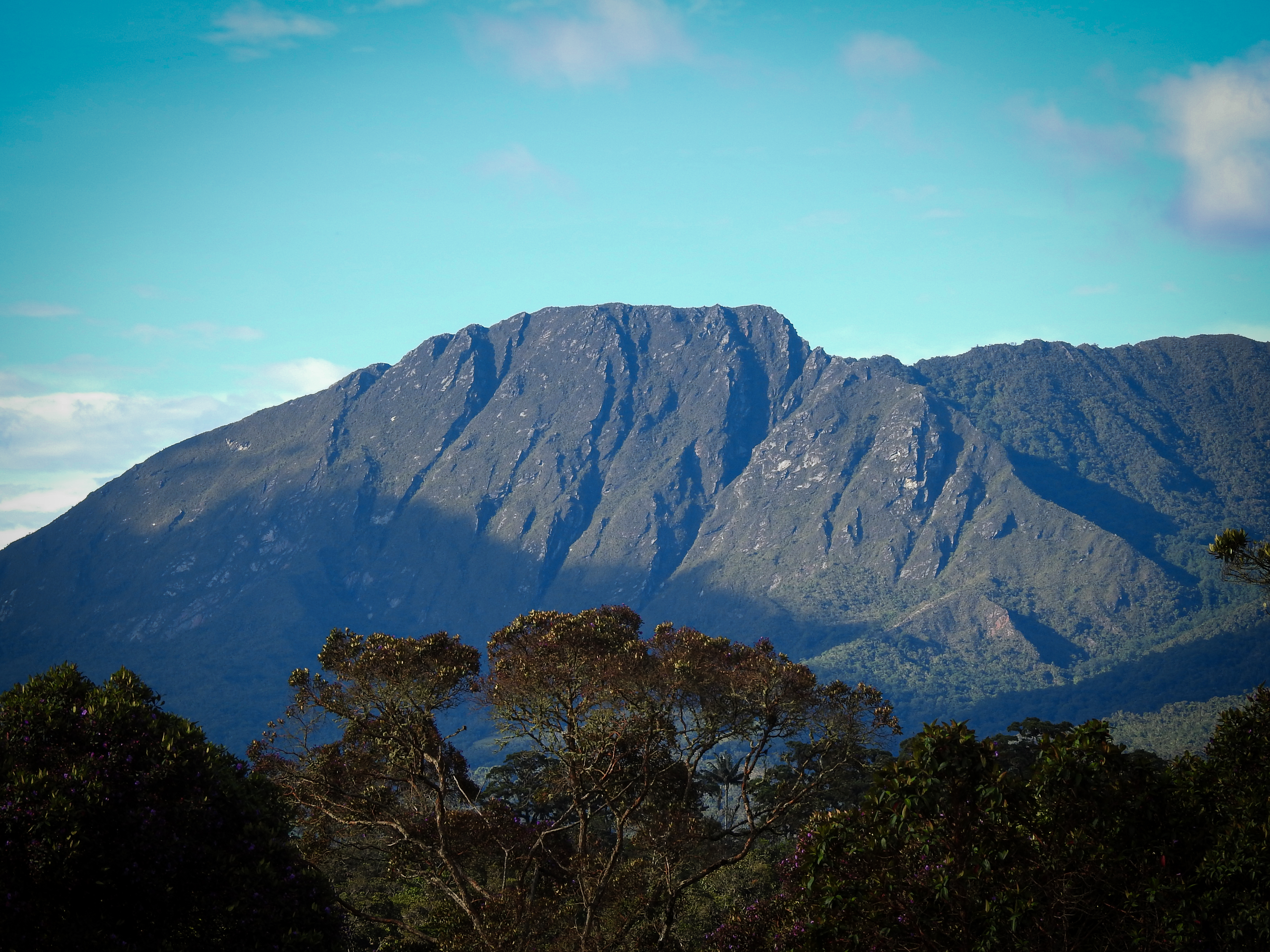

- Location within Colombia
- Location: Eastern Ranges, Andes
- Nearest city: Pamplona, Colombia
- Coordinates: 7°18′N 72°18′W
- Area: 480 km^{2} (190 sq mi)
- Established: 6 June 1977
- Governing body: SINAP

The Tamá National Natural Park (Spanish: Parque Nacional Natural (PNN) Tamá) is a national park located in the Tamá Massif of the Andean Region of Colombia, between the municipalities Toledo and Herrán, in the department of Norte de Santander, in the northeastern part of the Eastern Ranges of the Colombian Andes. One of the main attractions of the park is a 820-metre-high (2,690 ft) waterfall, one of the world's highest.

== General ==
The park is connected to El Tamá National Park in Venezuela via the borders to the Venezuelan states Táchira and Apure, together they form a larger protected area with an additional 1,390 km^{2} (540 sq mi). On the Colombian side, 47,550 hectares (117,500 acres) (99%) of the park is located in Toledo and 450 hectares (1,100 acres) in Herrán. It was established on 6 June 1977 for conservational, scientific and recreational reasons.

The altitude varies between 800 and 3,800 metres (2,600 and 12,500 ft) above mean sea level, with the majority of the park located higher than 2,500 metres (8,200 ft). The average temperature is between 6 and 25 °C (43 and 77 °F).

== Flora and fauna ==
The forests are included in the Venezuelan Andes montane forests ecoregion, which also covers the Venezuelan Andean cordillera. Tamá has four types of natural environments: tropical rainforest, sub-Andean forest, Andean forest and páramo. Notable flora include: Weinmannia pubescens, Wettinia microcarpa, Befaria glauca, Mexican alder and endemic Espeletia uribei which grows higher than metres. Palms prosper in the lower-altitudes, and moss of the genus Sphagnum grows in the swamps.

The fauna is varied, notable mammals found in the area include: spectacled bear, opossum, deer, mountain lion and anteater. Notable birds include: oilbird, endangered northern helmeted curassow and flame-winged parakeet, a species endemic to the region. Tamá harlequin frog and Helena's marsupial frog are endemic to the Páramo de Tamá.

== Hydrography ==
The water resources generated in the Tamá National Park are of interest for the economic and social development of the departments of Norte de Santander and Arauca in Colombia and the states of Táchira and Apure in Venezuela.

The hydrographic network of the Tamá National Natural Park, which drains towards the watershed of the Maracaibo basin (Táchira river that collects water from the Orocué Creek, La Pedrera, La Colorada and Agua Blanca) and the watershed of the Orinoco basin (the river Oirá, which serves as the boundary between the two countries from close to its source up to the milestone of the Garganta, receives affluents such as the Quebrada la Conquista, Río Oeste, Río Verde, Río San José, Quebrada la Garganta). In the western sector of the Park, important rivers and streams are born, such as the Jordan River, Talco River, and San Lorenzo River, which flow into the Margua River and finally into the Orinoco Basin.

The Tamá National Park water complex benefits the communities in agricultural activities and in the supply of water for the communal and municipal aqueducts, and supplies the demand of more than 2,000,000 inhabitants located in territories of the states of Apure and Táchira in Venezuela and of the departments of Norte de Santander, Boyacá and Arauca in Colombia.
