= Cordylancistrus daguae =

Conservation status
- Least Concern (IUCN 3.1)

Scientific classification
- Kingdom: Animalia
- Phylum: Chordata
- Class: Actinopterygii
- Order: Siluriformes
- Family: Loricariidae
- Genus: Cordylancistrus
- Species: C. daguae

Binomial name
- Cordylancistrus daguae (C. H. Eigenmann, 1912)

Synonyms
- Hemiancistrus daguae C. H. Eigenmann, 1912; Pseudoancistrus daguae (C. H. Eigenmann 1912); Lasiancistrus daguae (C. H. Eigenmann, 1912)

Species of catfish

Cordylancistrus daguae is a species of freshwater ray-finned fish belonging to the family Loricariidae, the suckermouth armoured catfishes, and the subfamily Hypostominae, the suckermouth catfishes. This catfish is endemic to Colombia where it is found in the basins of the Dagua River and the upper Cauca. This species reaches a total length of 9.5 cm (3.7 in).
