= Helena's marsupial frog =

Conservation status
- Endangered (IUCN 3.1)

Scientific classification
- Kingdom: Animalia
- Phylum: Chordata
- Class: Amphibia
- Order: Anura
- Family: Hemiphractidae
- Genus: Gastrotheca
- Species: G. helenae

Binomial name
- Gastrotheca helenae Dunn, 1944

Species of amphibian

Helena's marsupial frog (Gastrotheca helenae) is a species of frog in the family Hemiphractidae. It is endemic to the Páramo de Tamá on the Venezuelan-Colombian border and occurs in Apure and Táchira states of Venezuela and Norte de Santander Department on the Cordillera Oriental of Colombia. It is named after Helen Gaige, an American herpetologist.

== Description ==
Gastrotheca helenae is a large marsupial frog. The holotype, an adult female, measured 62 mm (2.4 in) in snout–vent length. The dorsum is smooth and bright green in color; the sides and belly are reddish brown with white markings. The belly and throat are quite rugose. The toes are about half-webbed whereas the fingers have only traces of webbing.

== Habitat and conservation ==
Its natural habitats are cloud forests and páramo at elevations of 2,300–3,600 m (7,500–11,800 ft) above sea level. It is much more easily heard than seen.

The species occurs in the Tamá National Natural Park in Colombia and El Tamá National Park in Venezuela. Within the park, it is considered safe. Outside the park, threats include fires, logging, livestock cultivation, and feral horses. The frog appears to be sensitive to even small changes in microclimate. It was abundant in the mid-1980s when last surveyed. Scientists have not detected the fungus Batrachochytrium dendrobatidis on this species as yet.
