= Cordylancistrus =

Scientific classification
- Kingdom: Animalia
- Phylum: Chordata
- Class: Actinopterygii
- Order: Siluriformes
- Family: Loricariidae
- Subfamily: Hypostominae
- Genus: Cordylancistrus; Isbrücker, 1980

Type species
- Pseudancistrus torbesensis Schultz, 1944

Genus of fishes

Cordylancistrus is a genus of freshwater ray-finned fishes belonging to the family Loricariidae, the suckermouth armoured catfishes, and the subfamily Hypostominae, the suckermouth catfishes. This genus is found in South America. It is much the same as Chaetostoma. The few differences are a wider head, longer cheek odontodes, and plates on the snout. Cordylancistrus can be found in rivers and streams high in the Andes, from Venezuela to Colombia.

== Species ==
There are currently 7 recognized species in this genus:

- Cordylancistrus daguae (C. H. Eigenmann, 1912)
- Cordylancistrus nephelion Provenzano & Milani, 2006
- Cordylancistrus perijae Pérez & Provenzano, 1996
- Cordylancistrus pijao Provenzano & Villa-Navarro, 2017
- Cordylancistrus setosus (Boulenger, 1887)
- Cordylancistrus tayrona Provenzano, Milani & Ardila Rodríguez, 2017
- Cordylancistrus torbesensis (Schultz, 1944)
