= Córdoba Municipality, Táchira =

Municipality in Táchira, Venezuela

Córdoba Municipality Municipio Córdoba
- Municipality
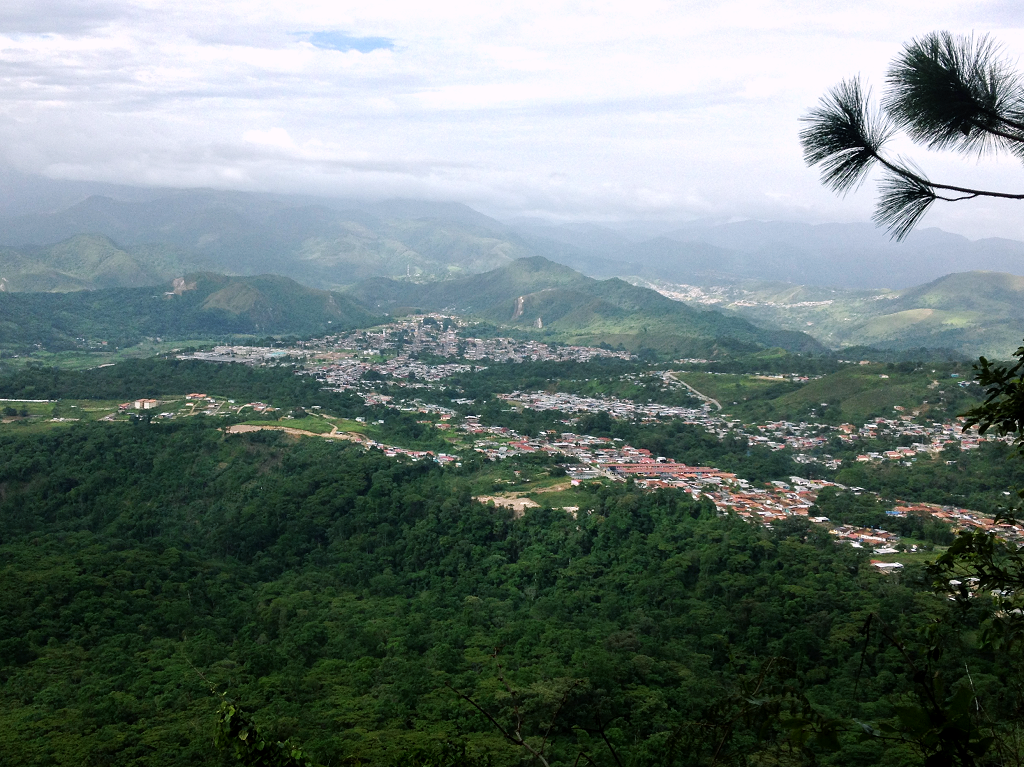

- Flag Seal

- Location in Táchira

- Location in Venezuela
- Country: Venezuela
- State: Táchira
- Founded: 2014
- Municipal seat: Santa Ana del Táchira

Government
  - Mayor: Flor Mártinez (PSUV)

Area
  - Total: 600.2 km^{2} (231.7 sq mi)

Population (2018)
  - Total: 39,438
  - Density: 65.71/km^{2} (170.2/sq mi)
- Time zone: UTC−4 (VET)

Córdoba Municipality is one of the 29 municipalities in Táchira state, Venezuela. The municipality has a total surface of 619 km^{2} and it has some 39,438 inhabitants (2018 census). Its capital is Santa Ana del Táchira.
