= Cordylancistrus nephelion =

Scientific classification
- Kingdom: Animalia
- Phylum: Chordata
- Class: Actinopterygii
- Order: Siluriformes
- Family: Loricariidae
- Genus: Cordylancistrus
- Species: C. nephelion

Binomial name
- Cordylancistrus nephelion Provenzano & Milani, 2006

Species of catfish

Cordylancistrus nephelion is a species of freshwater ray-finned fish belonging to the family Loricariidae, the suckermouth armoured catfishes, and the subfamily Hypostominae, the suckermouth catfishes. This catfish is endemic to Venezuela where it occurs in the drainage system of the Tuy River. It is known to inhabit streams with transparent water, moderate to strong flow, and a substrate of stone, gravel, or sand. The species reaches a standard length of 12.9 cm (5.1 in). Although this species has not been assessed by the International Union for Conservation of Nature, the describing authors have stated that the extreme anthropogenic alteration of the Tuy River basin implies that this species, alongside many others in the basin, is endangered.
