= Cordylancistrus setosus =

Scientific classification
- Kingdom: Animalia
- Phylum: Chordata
- Class: Actinopterygii
- Order: Siluriformes
- Family: Loricariidae
- Genus: Cordylancistrus
- Species: C. setosus

Binomial name
- Cordylancistrus setosus (Boulenger, 1887)

Synonyms
- Chaetostomus setosus Boulenger, 1887; Dolichancistrus setosus (Boulenger, 1887); Lasiancistrus setosus (Boulenger, 1887)

Species of catfish

Cordylancistrus setosus is a species of freshwater ray-finned fish belonging to the family Loricariidae, the suckermouth armoured catfishes, and the subfamily Hypostominae, the suckermouth catfishes. This catfish is endemic to Colombia, where it was rediscovered and redescribed in 2018 from the upper Fundación River, on the southwestern slope of the Sierra Nevada de Santa Marta in Cesar. This species reaches a standard length of 12.0 cm (4.7 in).
