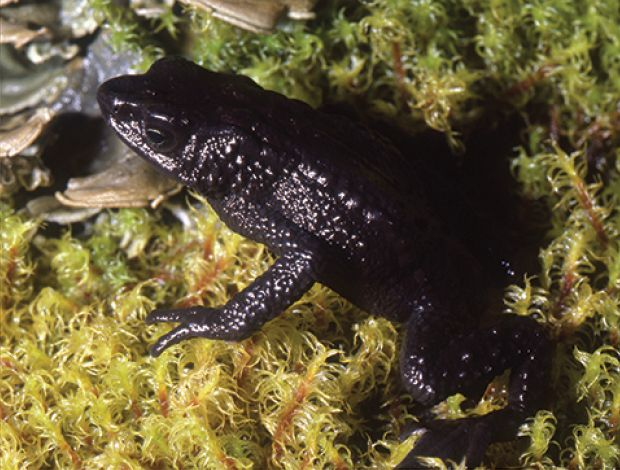

Conservation status
- Critically Endangered (IUCN 3.1)

Scientific classification
- Kingdom: Animalia
- Phylum: Chordata
- Class: Amphibia
- Order: Anura
- Family: Bufonidae
- Genus: Atelopus
- Species: A. tamaense

Binomial name
- Atelopus tamaense La Marca, García-Pérez, and Renjifo, 1990

Synonyms
- Atelopus tamaensis La Marca, García-Pérez, and Renjifo, 1990

= Atelopus tamaense =

Species of amphibian

Atelopus tamaense, the Tamá harlequin frog or Venezuela stubfoot toad, is a toadspecies in the family Bufonidae. It is endemic to the Páramo de Tamá on the Venezuelan-Colombian border and is found in Apure and (likely) Táchira states of Venezuela, and Norte de Santander Department on the Cordillera Oriental of Colombia.

Its natural habitats are sphagnum bogs within the páramo ecosystems and upper montane forests at elevations of 2,950–3,200 m (9,680–10,500 ft) above sea level.

The species is present in the Tamá National Natural Park in Colombia and El Tamá National Park in Venezuela. Habitat degradation due to fire is a major threat, however, the primary threat to this specie is chytridiomycosis, which has negatively impacted many other montane Atelopus species.
