= Táchira Depression =

Táchira depression
- Depresión de Táchira
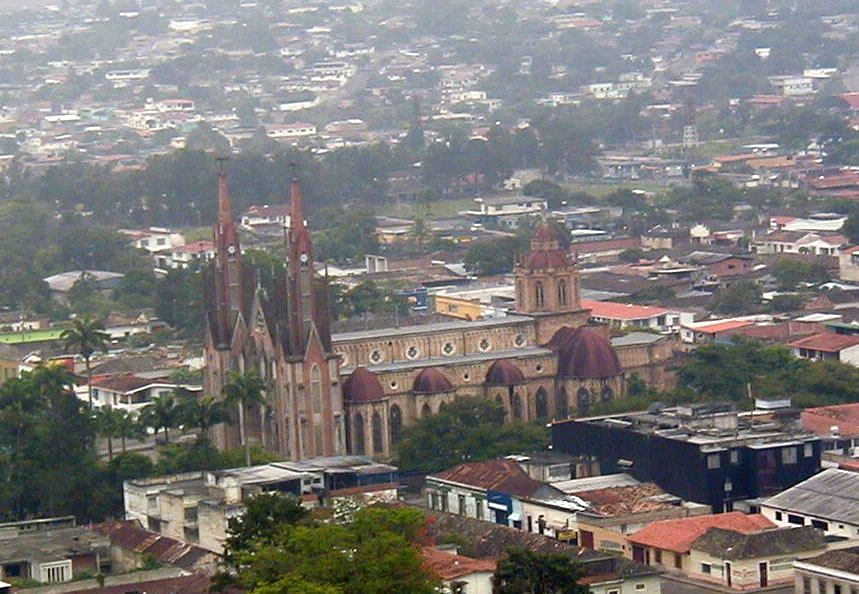
- City of Rubio, Táchira

- Location within Venezuela
- Elevation: 1,020 metres (3,350 ft)

Third Approach
- Location: Táchira, Venezuela
- Range: Cordillera Oriental – Cordillera de Mérida
- Coordinates: 7.6938°N 72.4099°W

The Táchira Depression (Spanish: Depresión de Táchira) is a saddle of land connecting the Lake Maracaibo basin to the Orinoco basin in the state of Táchira, Venezuela. It forms a break in the eastern Andes, separating the Tamá Massif to the west from the Cordillera de Mérida to the east. The depression has been thought to present a barrier to the movement of species between the Colombian and Venezuelan Andes, but this effect may have been relatively low during the recent ice ages. The mountains of the region have potential for coffee farming and hydroelectric power generation, while the lower levels are suitable for farming.

== Location ==
The Eastern Cordillera of the Colombian Andes forks from the Pamplona Node into two long branches. The Cordillera de Periiá extends northward and the Tamá Massif and Cordillera de Mérida extends in a northeast direction. The second branch is divided by the Táchira depression, an area of low lands between the valleys of the Táchira River to the west, the Lobaterita and Torbes rivers to the east and the Quinimarí to the south.

The Táchira depression covers an area of about 9,317 square kilometres (3,597 sq mi). The depression has a northern slope in the basin of Lake Maracaibo, drained by the Táchira, Lobatera, La Grita, Orope and Escalante rivers, and a southern slope in the Orinoco basin drained by the Uribante, Torbes, Quinimarí, Doradas, Sarare, Piscuri and Narvay rivers.

== Formation ==
More than 50 million years ago the Táchira depression was a strait that connected Lake Maracaibo with the Orinoco basin. Today it separates the Tamá Massif, a prolongation of the Cordillera Oriental of the Colombian Andes, from the Cordillera de Mérida in the Venezuelan Andes. This gap between the Colombian and Venezuelan Andes is a product of orogenic movements in the Paleogene period that created major faults, raised blocks and formed rifts including the Táchira Depression. There are four faults with northwest-southeast trends aligned in echelon across the Tachira depression between Córdoba in Colombia to the west and Torondoy in Venezuela to the east. This pattern indicates that the region to the south of the depression must have moved westward relative to the region to the north.

== Structure ==
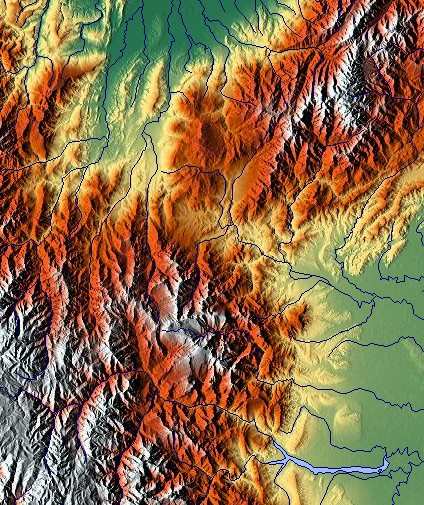
Relief map. The depression separates the Tamá Massif (lower left) from the Cordillera de Mérida (upper right).

The region may be divided into three main physiographic units: mountains, valleys and piedmont lake and plain. The mountains cover 71% of the total area, characterized by very irregular relief with slopes of more than 35%, with high and low mountains between the Batallón the Negra páramos (high moors). Soils are generally shallow and have low natural fertility. The valleys that run between the mountains cover 7% of the area, including the valleys of the Torbes, Grita, Quinimarí, Uribante, Venegará and Táchira rivers. The piedmont region that extends to the north and the piedmont in the Llanos (grassland plain) to the southeast covers the remaining 22%.

== Climate ==
The climate varies considerably depending on the relief of each area, which affects the prevailing winds and precipitation. The climate is tropical in the premontane piedmont and the low mountains, and in some valleys, semi-arid in regions like Lobatera, San Antonio del Táchira and Ureña, and humid in the upper and middle basins of the Uribante, Dorados and Camburito rivers. On the southeastern slope the influence of air masses from the llanos causes a single rainy season, usually from April to November. On the northwestern slope the influence of Lake Maracaibo causes rainy seasons from April to June and from September to November, and dry seasons from December to March and from July to August. In some areas the lack of water means that agriculture depends on irrigation, while in others the excess rain causes erosion and flooding.

== Ecology ==
The depression is divided between the Cordillera Oriental montane forests ecoregion to the southwest and the Venezuelan Andes montane forests ecoregion to the northeast. It merges into the Catatumbo moist forests ecoregion to the northwest and the Apure–Villavicencio dry forests ecoregion to the southeast.

It has been assumed that the Táchira Depression is a barrier to movement of species between the Venezuelan Cordillera de Mérida and the Colombian Cordillera Oriental, since flora and fauna adapted to the cool, moist mountain climate would find the warm, dry conditions in the depression unsuitable. However, during the Last Glacial Maximum from around 26,500 to 20,000 years before the present the cooler climate led to upper vegetation belts moving down to lower regions. The cool mesic habitats of the Cordillera Oriental and Cordillera de Mérida may have extended across the Táchira depression during this period.

A 2015 study that compared the vulnerable Merida brocket (Mazama bricenii) of the Venezuelan cordillera to its relative the little red brocket (Mazama rufina) of the Colombian cordillera found that Mazama bricenii should not be considered a separate species. The two populations would have exchanged genes until the start of the present Holocene interglacial period, and may still be doing so. This may apply to other mammal species thought to be endemic to the Venezuelan cordillera. The only Venezuelan endemic species that clearly met the conditions of being restricted to cloud forest and/or páramo, and of being distinctive from relatives in the Colombian cordillera, were Reig's montane mouse (Aepeomys reigi), Merida small-eared shrew (Cryptotis meridensis) and eastern mountain coati (Nasuella meridensis).

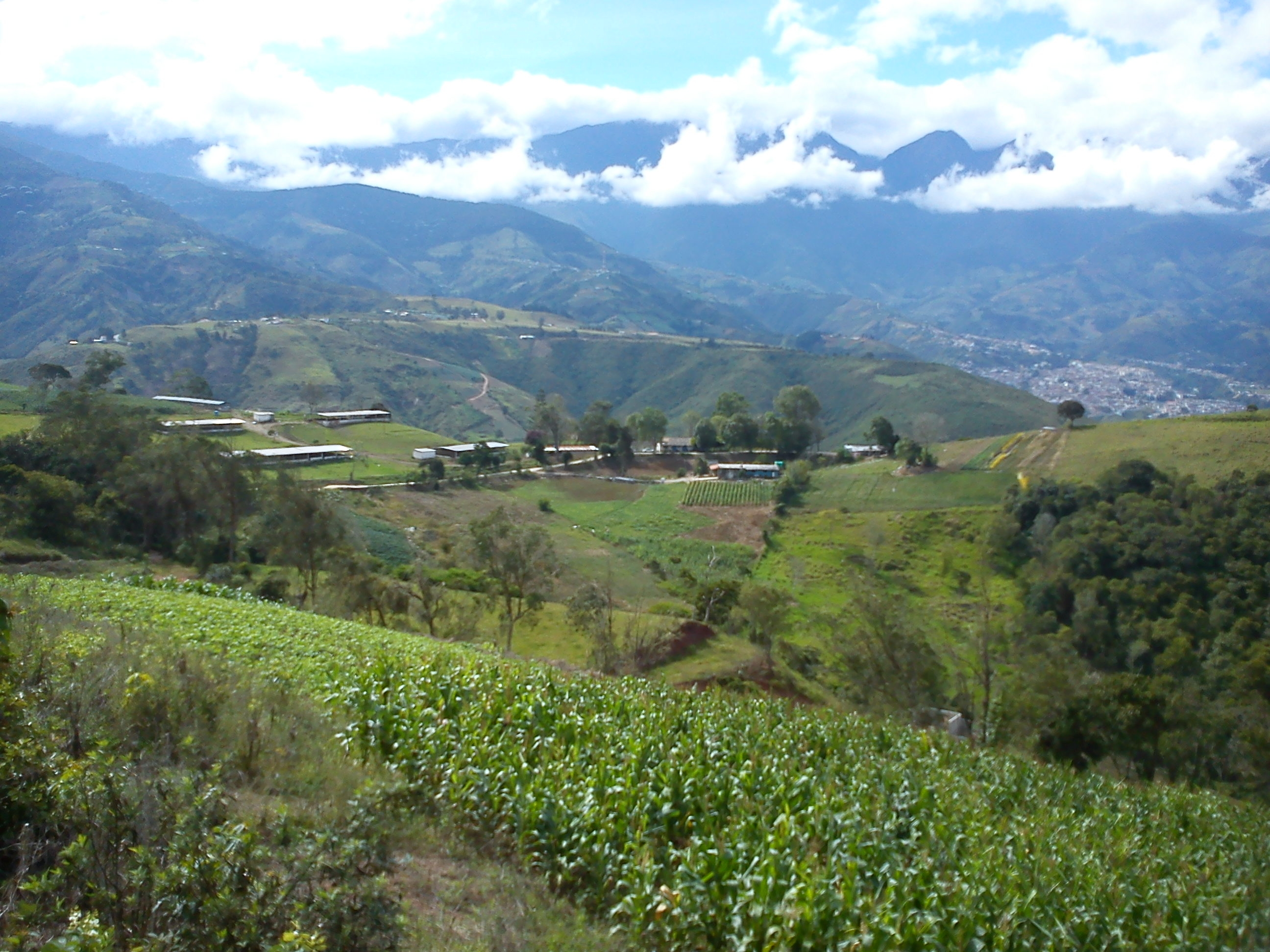
Landscape above the city of La Grita

== Economy ==
The depression is important in giving access from Lake Maracaibo to the southern llanos and to Colombia. The mountains from 800 to 1,800 metres (2,600 to 5,900 ft) have good potential for coffee cultivation. There are coffee plantations and fruit trees in some very localized areas of the mountains, and there are areas with agroforestry potential. Typically the soil in the short and narrow valleys is alluvial, caused by flooding, and valuable for farming. The piedmont region also has high agricultural potential. The valleys and piedmont areas are suitable for cultivation of flowers, fruit and livestock for milk. As of 1983 the Uribante-Caparo hydroelectric complex was being built. with several dams on the Uribante, Doradas, Camburito and Capero rivers, designed to produce 1,350 Mw of power. Micro-generating plants were planned on watercourses where dams are not practical. The region, with its dramatic landscape, diverse climate and traditional cultures has considerable tourism potential. Coal mining in the Táchira depression may threaten the Venezuelan Andes montane forests ecoregion in the adjacent Tamá Masif.

== Sources ==
- Bonaccorso, Elise, Northern South America: Northwestern Venezuela into Colombia, WWF: World Wildlife Fund
- Bucher, Walter Herman (1952), Geologic Structure and Orogenic History of Venezuela, Geological Society of America, ISBN 978-0-8137-1049-5
- El Tamá, Ministry of People's Power for Ecosocialism and Water
- Gutiérrez, EE; Maldonado, JE; Radosavljevic, A; Molinari, J; Patterson, BD; Martínez-C, JM; Amy R. Rutter; Melissa T. R. Hawkins; Franger J. Garcia; Kristofer M. Helgen (2015), "The Taxonomic Status of Mazama bricenii and the Significance of the Táchira Depression for Mammalian Endemism in the Cordillera de Mérida, Venezuela", PLOS ONE, 10 (6) e0129113, Bibcode:2015PLoSO..1029113G, doi:10.1371/journal.pone.0129113, PMC 4488270, PMID 26121688
- Hernandez, Armando; Campero, Alfredo; Moreno, Fidel (1983), Region Natural 7A: Depresion del Tachira (PDF) (in Spanish), Caracas: Sistemas Ambientales Venezolanos
- WildFinder, WWF: World Wildlife Fund
