= Táchira Railway =

Defunct Venezuelan railroad

Táchira Railway, the Gran Ferrocarril del Táchira, was a railway in Venezuela. It served a coffee growing region. It connected Encontrados to La Uraca. The line was to be retired in 1955 but continued for some time after that due to the area's lack of roads and dependency on it for connectivity. Other lines were nationalized.

== History ==
On March 31, 1884, the national government contracted with Manuel Tejera for a line from La Fria to El Brazo. Construction did not commence and on December 31, 1892 the government contracted with Juan and Benito Roncajolo. The government was to receive 5 percent of the line's profits. After 1913 the levy was dropped and land grants provided for expansion. The line was extended to Uraca, Meseta de Cara de Perro, and ultimately to Tachira Station. The company leased its land grants to farmers and ranchers.

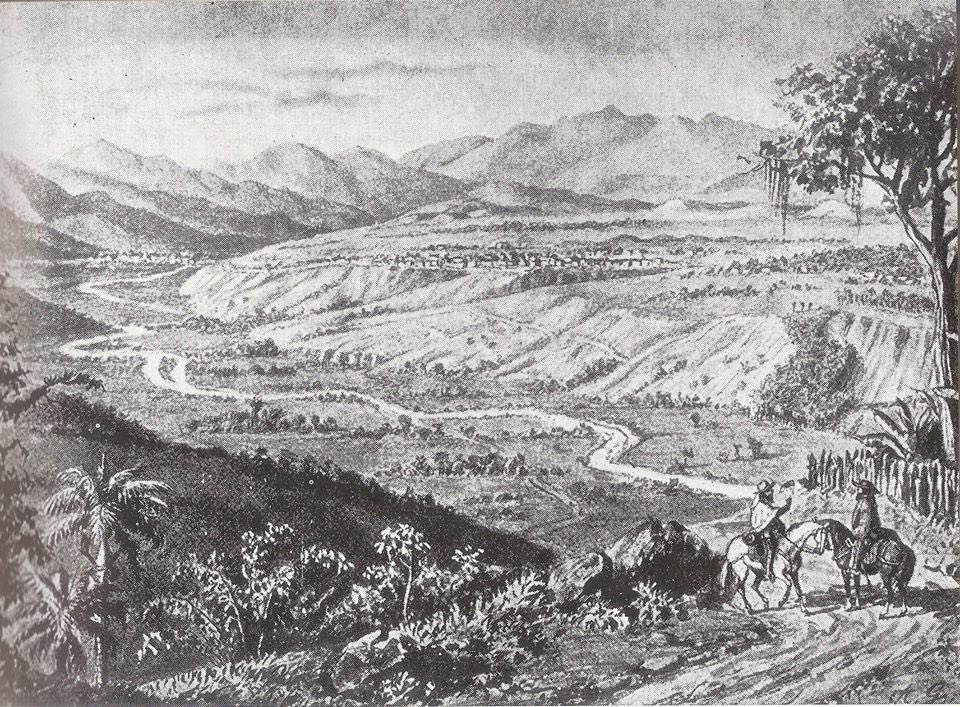
Print from a drawing by German naturalist Anton Goering of the a landscape in the Táchira region

In 1924 another contract was agreed to for expansion and upgrading of the line. A branch was added from Orope to Grita.

== See also ==
- Bolivar Railroad (Ferrocarril Bolívar), a map was sold of it
- Anton Goering, German naturalist who wrote about the region
