= Tachira antpitta =

Táchira antpitta

Conservation status
- Critically Endangered (IUCN 3.1)

Scientific classification
- Kingdom: Animalia
- Phylum: Chordata
- Class: Aves
- Order: Passeriformes
- Family: Grallariidae
- Genus: Grallaria
- Species: G. chthonia

Binomial name
- Grallaria chthonia Wetmore & Phelps Jr, 1956

Species of bird

The Tachira antpitta (Grallaria chthonia) is a Critically Endangered bird species in the family Grallariidae. It is endemic to Venezuela.

== History ==
The Tachira antpitta was long known only from the type specimen and three others collected in the mid-1950s. They were taken at the hacienda La Providencia at the Rio Chiquita in the south-western part of Táchira state, Venezuela; the site is now within El Tamá National Park. Despite searches in succeeding years, only in 2016 was the species rediscovered. A team of researchers from the Red Siskin Initiative, a conservation partnership between the Smithsonian Institution and several Venezuelan scientific organizations, found six individual in the same area as its discovery. Expedition members took the first photographs in the wild and made the first sound recordings of the species.

== Taxonomy and systematics ==
As far as is known, the Tachira antpitta is monotypic.

Some authors have suggested that it should be treated as a subspecies of the scaled antpitta (G. guatimalensis). Others have suggested that it is more closely related to the moustached antpitta (G. alleni).

== Description ==
Grallaria antpittas are a "wonderful group of plump and round antbirds whose feathers are often fluffed up...they have stout bills [and] very short tails". The moustached antpitta is 15 to 19 cm (5.9 to 7.5 in) long. The sexes have the same plumage. Adults have a brown forecrown and a gray hindcrown and nape with black scaled appearance. They have a mostly olive brown face with a wide light buff "moustache". Their upperparts, wings, and tail are olive brown with thin blackish edges on the back feathers that give a scaly appearance. Their chin and throat are olive brown with black tips on the feathers and a light buff patch in the center of the throat. Their upper breast is buff brown, their lower breast and belly dull whitish buff with faint gray streaks, their flanks buffier with faint gray streaks, and their crissum rich buff. Both sexes have a dark iris, a black bill with a pale olive-buff base to the mandible, and brown legs and feet.

== Distribution and habitat ==
The Tachira antpitta is known only from the small area in Táchira where the four specimens were taken and the 2016 and a few subsequent sight records made. The area is almost on the Colombian border so it is thought possible that the species does or did occur in that country. All of the known encounters were in the undergrowth of thick mossy cloudforest between 1,800 and 2,100 m (5,900 and 6,900 ft) in elevation.

== Behavior ==
=== Movement ===
As far as is known the Tachira antpitta is resident in its range.

=== Feeding ===
The Tachira antpitta's diet and foraging behavior are not known, though it almost certainly feeds mostly on invertebrates.

=== Breeding ===
Nothing is known about the Tachira antpitta's breeding biology. It is assumed to make a nest like those of other Gralleria antpittas, a cup of plant material sited close to the ground.

=== Vocalization ===
As of late 2024, xeno-canto had no recordings of Tachira antpitta vocalizations. The Cornell Lab of Ornithology's Macaulay Library has a few.

== Status ==
The IUCN originally in 1988 assessed the Tachira antpitta as Threatened, then in 1994 as Vulnerable, in 2000 as Endangered, and since 2008 as Critically Endangered. It has an extremely small range and its estimated population of fewer than 50 mature individuals is believed to be decreasing. "This part of the Andes is one of the most seriously threatened by deforestation for agriculture." Most of the forest in its known area of habitation has been cleared for agriculture, mainly coffee and potatoes. Even the nominal protection afforded by El Tamá National Park has been compromised; almost 20% of its area has been converted to coffee plantations and cattle pasture.
