= Anton Goering =

Natural scientist, ornithologist, zoologist, painter, taxidermist (1836–1905)

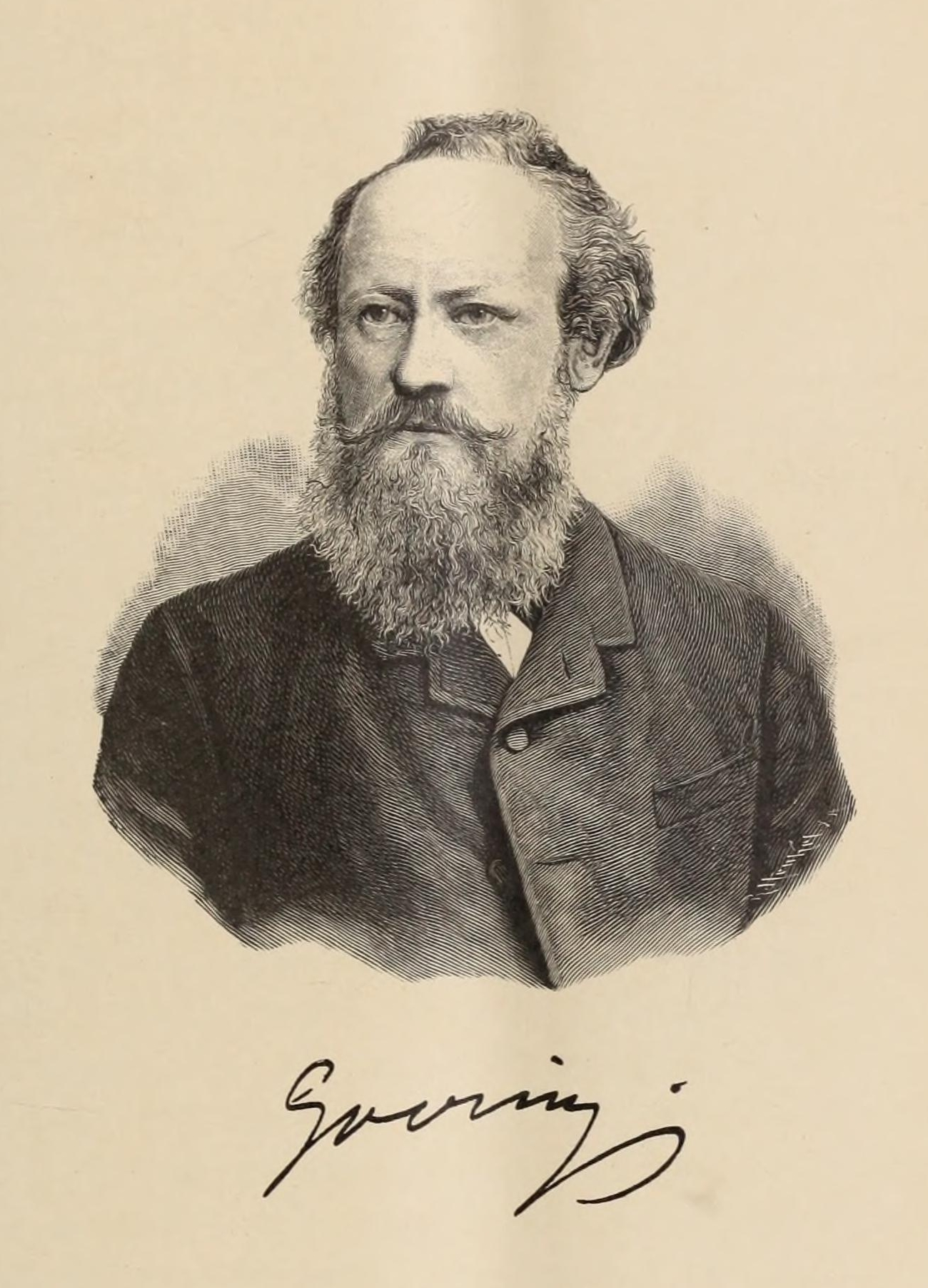
Anton Goering

Christian Anton Goering (18 September 1836, Thonhausen - 7 December 1905, Leipzig) was a German naturalist, painter and graphic artist who spent several years in Venezuela.

== Biography ==
=== Study and travels ===
He learned taxidermy from his father, who was a member of several ornithological societies. It was at a meeting of one of these societies that he met Christian Ludwig Brehm who helped him obtain a position at the Ornithological Museum of the University of Halle, where he worked under the direction of Hermann Burmeister. From 1856 to 1858, they travelled in South America and he decided to pursue his interests in natural history. He also went to London, where he took lessons from the zoological artist Joseph Wolf. While he was there, the Secretary of the Zoological Society, Philip Sclater, asked him to go to Venezuela to collect specimens for the British Museum.

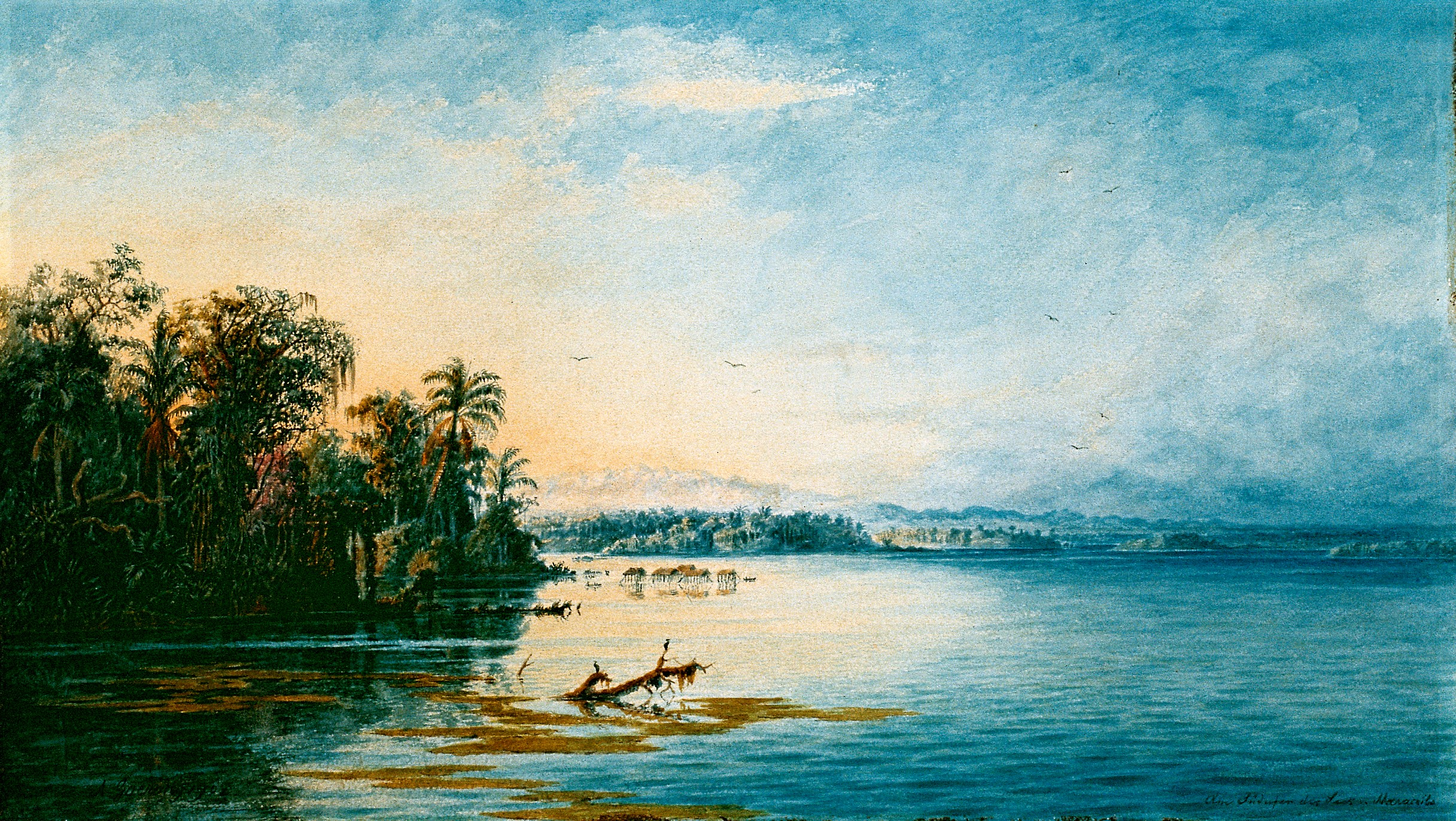
Lake Valencia

In 1866, he arrived in Venezuela at the port of Carúpano, where he began collecting. During May and June 1867, he visited the town of Caripe and explored the Cueva del Guácharo, collecting specimens of the elusive oilbird. After that, he spent some time in central Venezuela, collecting zoological specimens and Pre-Columbian artifacts.

Following extensive travels that included a visit to Curaçao, he came to a stop in Mérida in 1869, where he discovered a natural bridge over a local stream. This prompted him to create a series of watercolors depicting the landscapes and folk customs in the surrounding area.

He stayed in the Andes from 1869 to 1872, then spent some time in Colonia Tovar, a German settlement near the coast, before returning to Caracas. While there, he shared notes with the English spelunker, James Mudie Spence (1836-1878). They also joined to create and promote an artistic salon which came to be known as the "Exposición Anual de Bellas Artes Venezolanas". Goering presented over 50 drawings and watercolors at their first exhibition in 1872. Later that same year, he and Spence participated in an expedition to climb the Pico Naiguatá; a side peak on present-day's hiking route is named after him. Goering returned to Germany in 1874.

=== Writings and honors ===
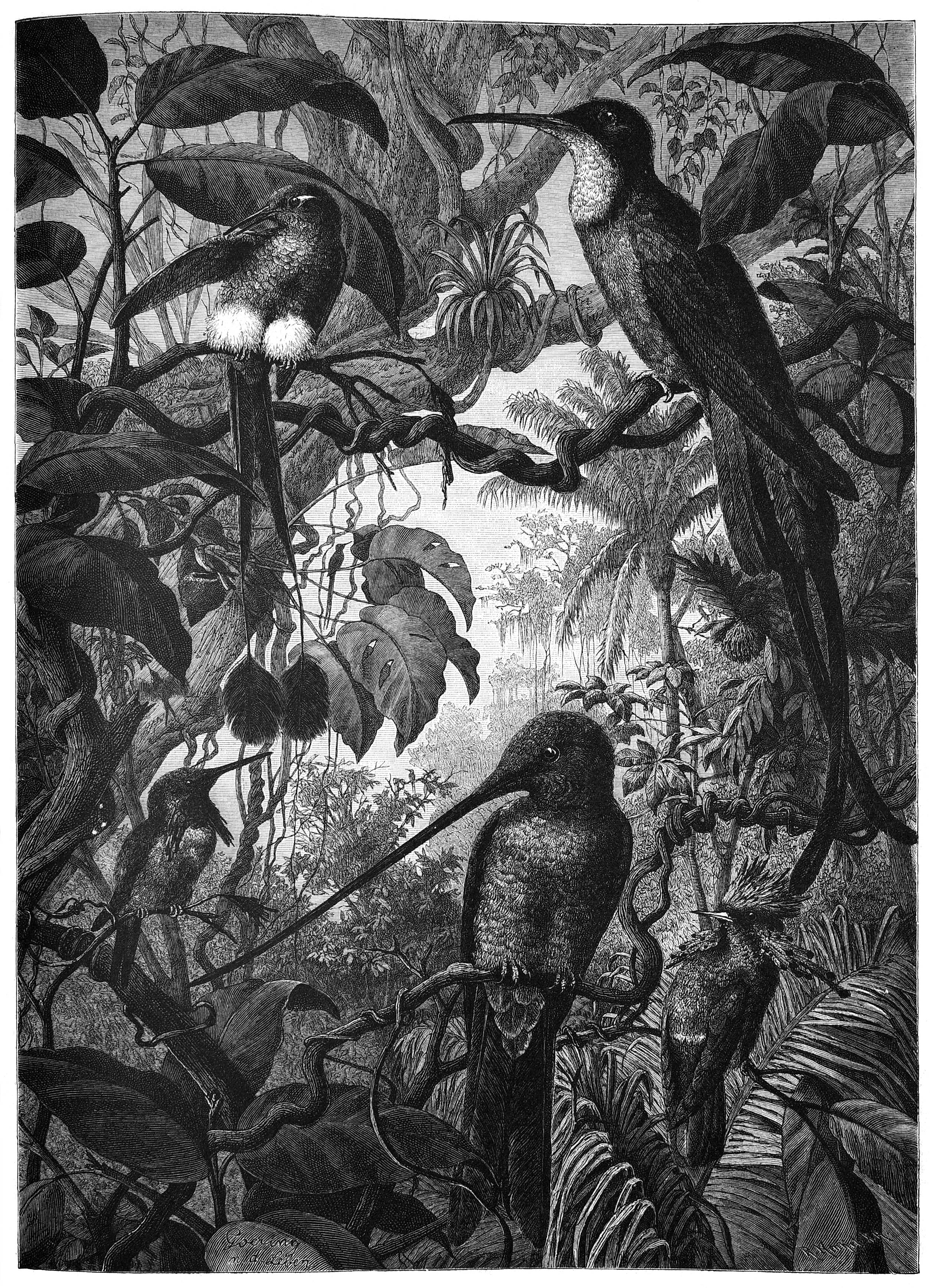
Hummingbirds, from Die Gartenlaube

In 1879, a selection of his drawings was published in Die Gartenlaube then, after eighteen years of organizing his notes and drawings, they were published in 1893 as Von Tropische tieflande zum ewigen schnee (From Tropical Lowlands to Everlasting Snow). This work was not translated into Spanish until 1962 when, on the occasion of its 150th anniversary, the University of the Andes published it under the title Venezuela, el más bello país tropical (Venezuela, the Most Beautiful Tropical Country). A new translation, with the original title, appeared in 1993.

Duke Ernst I of Saxe-Altenburg named him a Professor and awarded him the Saxe-Ernestine House Order. He was also a corresponding member of the Zoological Society of London. In 1957, when the speleologist Eugenio de Bellard Pietri discovered new galleries in the Cueva del Guácharo, he named one after Goering.
