= Cordylancistrus perijae =

Conservation status
- Near Threatened (IUCN 3.1)

Scientific classification
- Kingdom: Animalia
- Phylum: Chordata
- Class: Actinopterygii
- Order: Siluriformes
- Family: Loricariidae
- Genus: Cordylancistrus
- Species: C. perijae

Binomial name
- Cordylancistrus perijae Pérez & Provenzano, 1996

Species of catfish

Cordylancistrus perijae is a species of freshwater ray-finned fish belonging to the family Loricariidae, the suckermouth armoured catfishes, and the subfamily Hypostominae, the suckermouth catfishes. This catfish is endemic to Venezuela where it occurs in the Sierra de Perijá, being found in the Guasare River basin, part of the Lake Maracaibo drainage in Zulia. This species is found in montane rivers with clear waters and a moderate to strong current, where the riverbed consistes of cobble, gravel and sand. This species reaches a standard length of 12.7 cm (5.0 in). The International Union for Conservation of Nature assesses this species as Near Threatened because its habitat is threatened by pollution from mining and agriculture, as well as deforestation for agriculture.
