= Eugenio de Bellard Pietri =

Venezuelan speleologist

- Pietri, c. 1985
- Born: December 17, 1927; Maracaibo, Venezuela
- Died: August 31, 2000 (aged 72); Caracas, Venezuela

Eugenio de Bellard Pietri (December 17, 1927, in Maracaibo, Venezuela – August 31, 2000, in Caracas) was a noted speleologist. He was the founder of speleology in Venezuela and a member of the Academy of Sciences and Letters of Venezuela, vice-president of the Venezuelan Society of Natural Sciences and director of its speleological groups since 1952 when he founded this section. He was also a member of several speleological and conservation societies such as the French Federation of Speleology, the Explorers Club and the National Speleological Society (USA).

== Early life ==
He was the son of Eugene Pignat de Bellard and Mercedes Pietri Boulton. Eugene Pignat de Bellard was an American physician giving his services to the oil industry of the area of Maracaibo. Mercedes Pietri was the daughter of a well-respected family in Caracas, who own a large cacao plantation in Barlovento.

After obtaining his high school Diploma from the Colegio San Ignacio in Caracas he entered the Universidad Central de Venezuela (UCV). During the late 1940s several students saw a communist threat in the advent to government of a bunch of radical far-left politicians and decided to forestall the feared red invasion. They began by sticking anti-communism posters throughout the town. After a series of police raids netting several UCV "hotheads" and serious government warnings to the student’s parents, de Bellard Sr. decided to pack his son off to Colombia, to study at Bogotá University. The elder de Bellard wanted his son to follow in his own steps as a physician. While a sophomore there, Eugenio virtually witnessed the assassination of Colombia’s popular leader Jorge Eliecer Gaitan and the carnage ensuing the murder of Colombia’s hope for democratization in politics. Seeing thousands of deaths, mass imprisonment and a resurfacing of the traditional Colombian animosity against Venezuelans, made Eugenio decide to return to Caracas and tell his father that he wanted to study law. He went to Spain, where he became a lawyer at Salamanca University. Back in Venezuela he obtained his doctorate in law at Merida Los Andes University. Then he joined Shell de Venezuela and in 1969 became secretary of the board of Directors until 1974, a post he again held in PDVSA between 1979 and 1981, and in Corpoven from 1985 until 1987 when he retired.

== Cave exploration ==
Eugenio de Bellard was the first Venezuelan to make cave exploration a serious dedication, and throughout his life he worked to make the first speleological atlas of Venezuela. Among the many explorations he carried the best and most appreciated is the one he headed in 1957 to reach the end of the Cueva del Guácharo, when they crossed beyond what was until then thought the end of the cave and instead they found that there were 8 more kilometers left of galleries and stunning rooms.

He headed several cave searching and exploring multi-discipline expeditions; the last of which in 1987, he discovered and/or explored 40 new seashore caves in the eastern Paria Peninsula, and conducted research on the flora and fauna of the peninsula. Among them is that there are more than 300 caves in Paria alone and are populated by guacharos (Steatornis caripensis) which are unusual, because these caves are all at sea level and it was believed that guacharos only dwelled at higher altitudes, never below 500 meters.

He directed and organized three successful explorations into the Amazon jungle, to places like the top of Tepuis with gigantic holes, to Tapirapeco, where they were the first non-Amazonian humans to be seen by several tribes in the border between Brazil and Venezuela. These expedition brought an enormous wealth of new species to science and proved that the high tepuis of the Amazon were isolated enough to allow the evolution of separate species of insects, orchids, lizards and even birds.

Eugenio de Bellard has published several scientific works, among them a History of Speleology in Venezuela that covers the time between 1678 and 1950.

== Missile crisis ==
During the 1962 missile crisis in the USA with Russia. In his own words: “During the serious international ordeal of October 1962, when the Kennedy/Kruschev crisis blew up due to Russian nuclear missiles shipped to Fidel Castro’s Cuba, he released important information to the Caracas American embassy on caves that had been visited in the country by the polish engineer that was accused in world press as one of the technicians that set up rockets with nuclear warheads in Cuban caves: Maciej Kuczynski” (Letter to the USA Embassy in Caracas Venezuela, August 5, 1995). It happens to be that both himself and Kuczynski were speleologists and had initiated a fair correspondence since June 1958. Thus it happened that Kuczynski mentioned in some detail in his 1962 letters to de Bellard quite a number of Cuban caves he had explored. Such information was presented as a help to be used by American intelligence for exactly locating where the missiles threatening the USA were placed.

== Awards ==
During the nearly 30 years he spent in the oil industry, he found time to be elected member of the Academy of Physical, Mathematics and Natural Sciences; has been awarded the 1978 National Conservation Prize; and the Gold Medal by the Venezuelan Society of Natural Sciences for several achievements, among them the creation of the Society’s Speleology Group.
