= Torbes River =

Torbes River Río Torbes
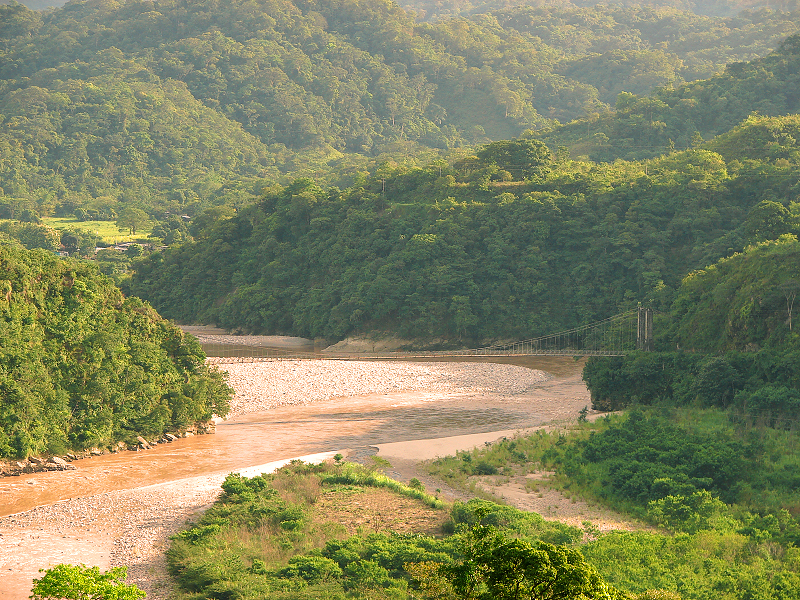

Location
- Country: Venezuela
- State: Táchira

Physical characteristics
- Source
  - location: Páramo El Zumbador, Venezuela
  - elevation: 2,600 m (8,500 ft)
- Mouth: Uribante River
  - location: Venezuela
  - elevation: 340 m (1,120 ft)
- Length: 82 km (51 mi)

Torbes River is an important river of short length which sources are located at the Táchira state, in Venezuela. The city of San Cristóbal is established at the left side of the river.

== See also ==
- List of rivers of Venezuela
