= Uribante River =

- Mouth location in Venezuela

Location
- Country: Venezuela

Physical characteristics
- Source
  - location: Venezuela
- Mouth
  - coordinates: 7°34′51″N 72°05′31″W

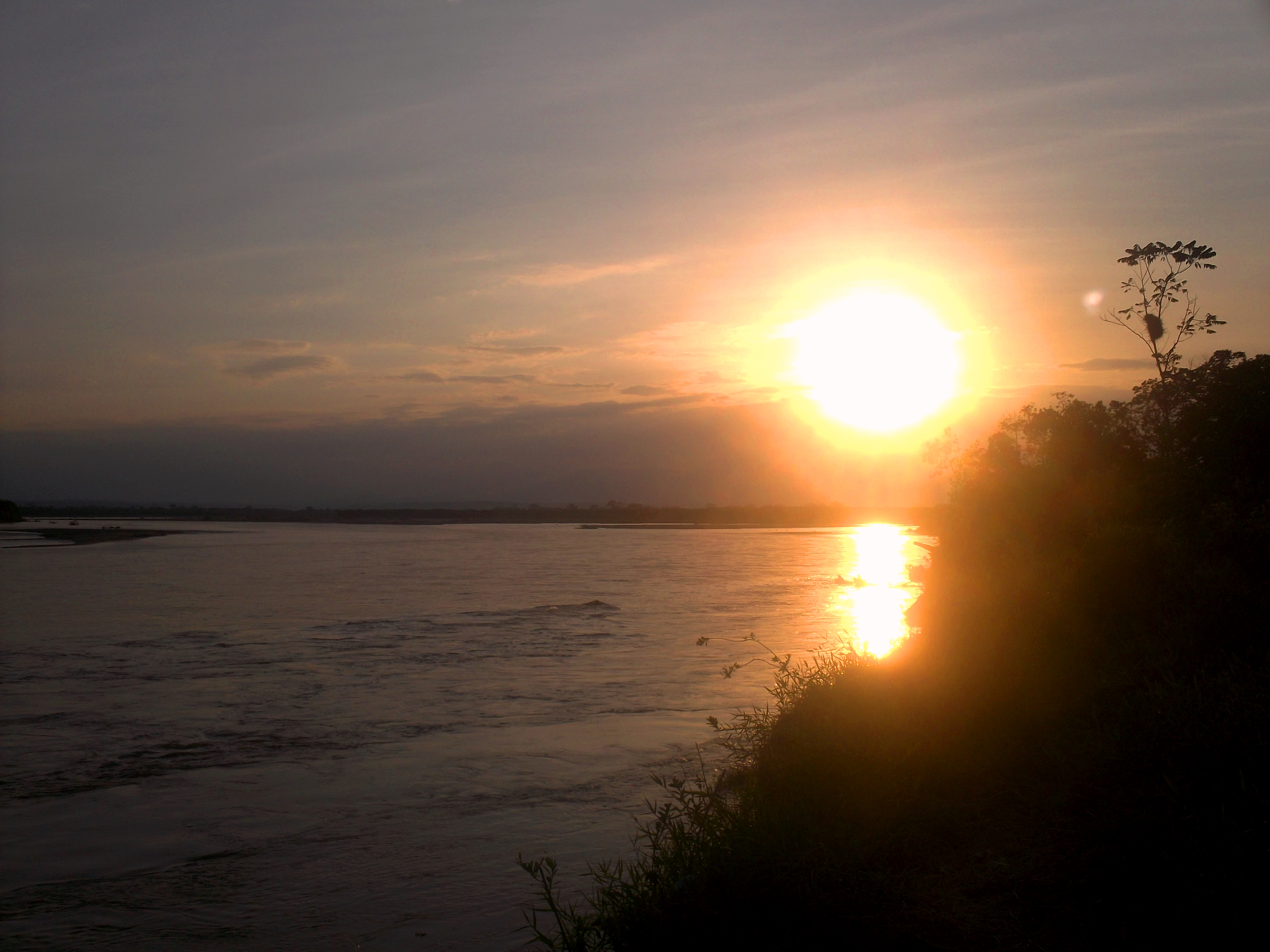

The Uribante River is a river of Venezuela, a tributary of the Apure River.

The river is in the Orinoco basin. It drains part of the southern slope of the Táchira depression.

== See also ==
- List of rivers of Venezuela

== Sources ==
- Hernandez, Armando; Campero, Alfredo; Moreno, Fidel (1983), Region Natural 7A: Depresion del Tachira (PDF) (in Spanish), Caracas: Sistemas Ambientales Venezolanos, archived from the original (PDF) on 2017-04-23
