= El Tamá National Park =

El Tamá National Park Parque Nacional El Tamá
- IUCN category II (national park)
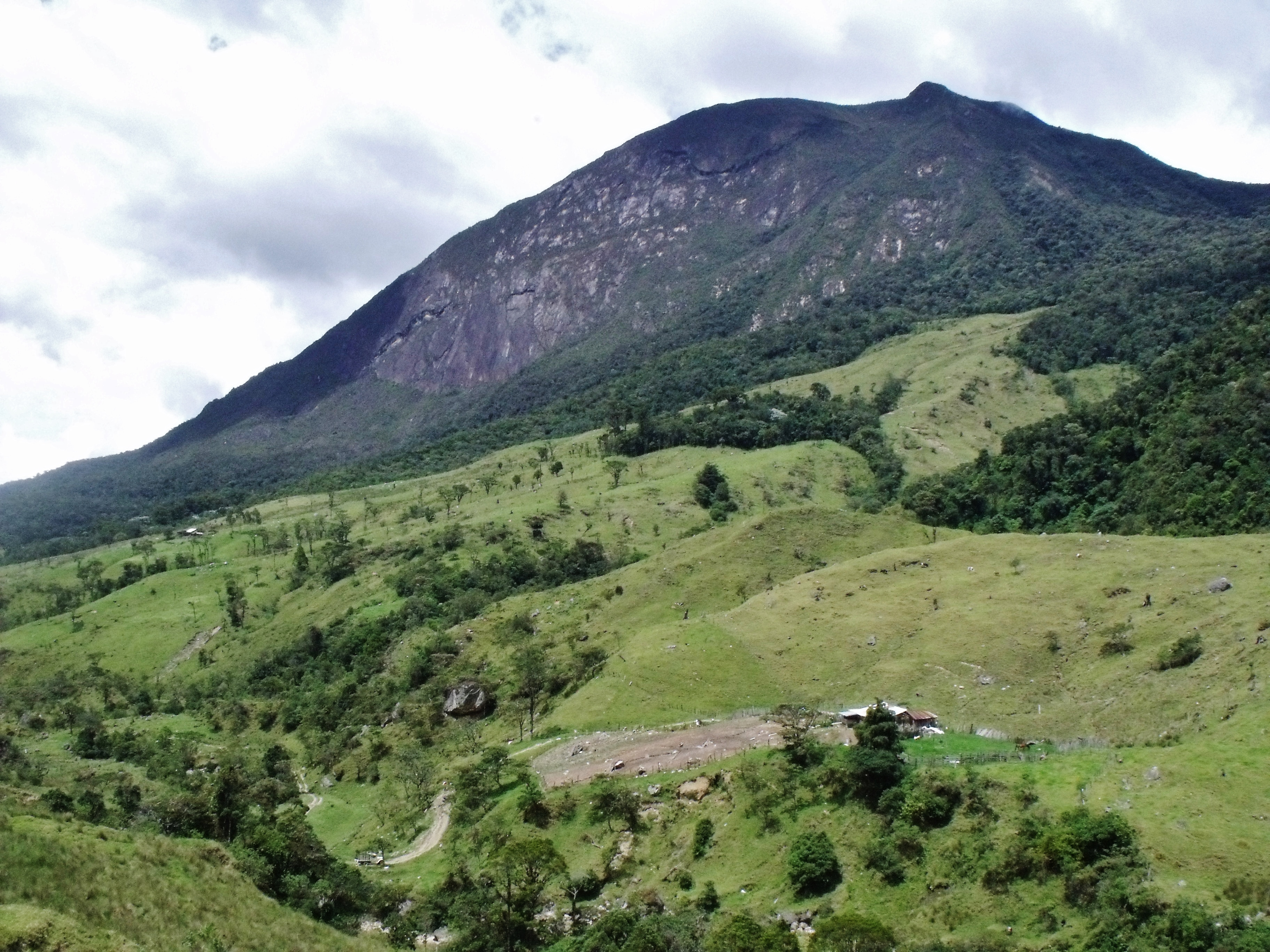

- Location within Venezuela
- Location: Venezuela
- Coordinates: 7°32′N 72°11′W
- Area: 1,390 km^{2} (540 sq mi)
- Established: December 12, 1978

The El Tamá National Park (Spanish: Parque nacional El Tamá) It is a protected area with the status of a national park that is located between the Andes and plains of Venezuela. It protects part of the Tamá Massif. It has an area of 139,000 hectares (340,000 acres) and is located in the states of Táchira (125,100 ha, 90% of the surface of the park) and Apure (13,900 ha, 10% of the park's surface), near the border with Colombia. Created as a National Park on December 12, 1978, by the then President Carlos Andrés Pérez.

The park is located in the páramos of Tamá with an altitude of 3,320 msnm, Cerro El Cobre with 3,613 msnm and "Judío" with 3,372 msnm, occupying the upper parts of the basins of the rivers Carapo, Río Chiquito, Quinimarí, Quite, Burguita, Burgua, Nula, Nulita, Sarare, Cutufí and Oirá, and the basins of the rivers Frio and Negro, in jurisdiction of the Municipalities Junín, Córdoba and Libertador of the Táchira and Paez of Apure State. Its creation was justified because it constitutes an exceptional natural sanctuary of flora, fauna and scenic beauties and that the area of the upper part of the Carapo, Río Chiquito, Quinimari, Quite, Burguita, Burgua, Nula, Nulita, Sarare, Cutufí and Oirá, as well as the entire area of the Frío and Negro river basins, which represent a valuable system of water protection zones, whose preservation is of public utility for the collective well-being of the Táchira State and the region of The Andes.

== See also ==
- List of national parks of Venezuela
- Sierra Nevada National Park (Venezuela)

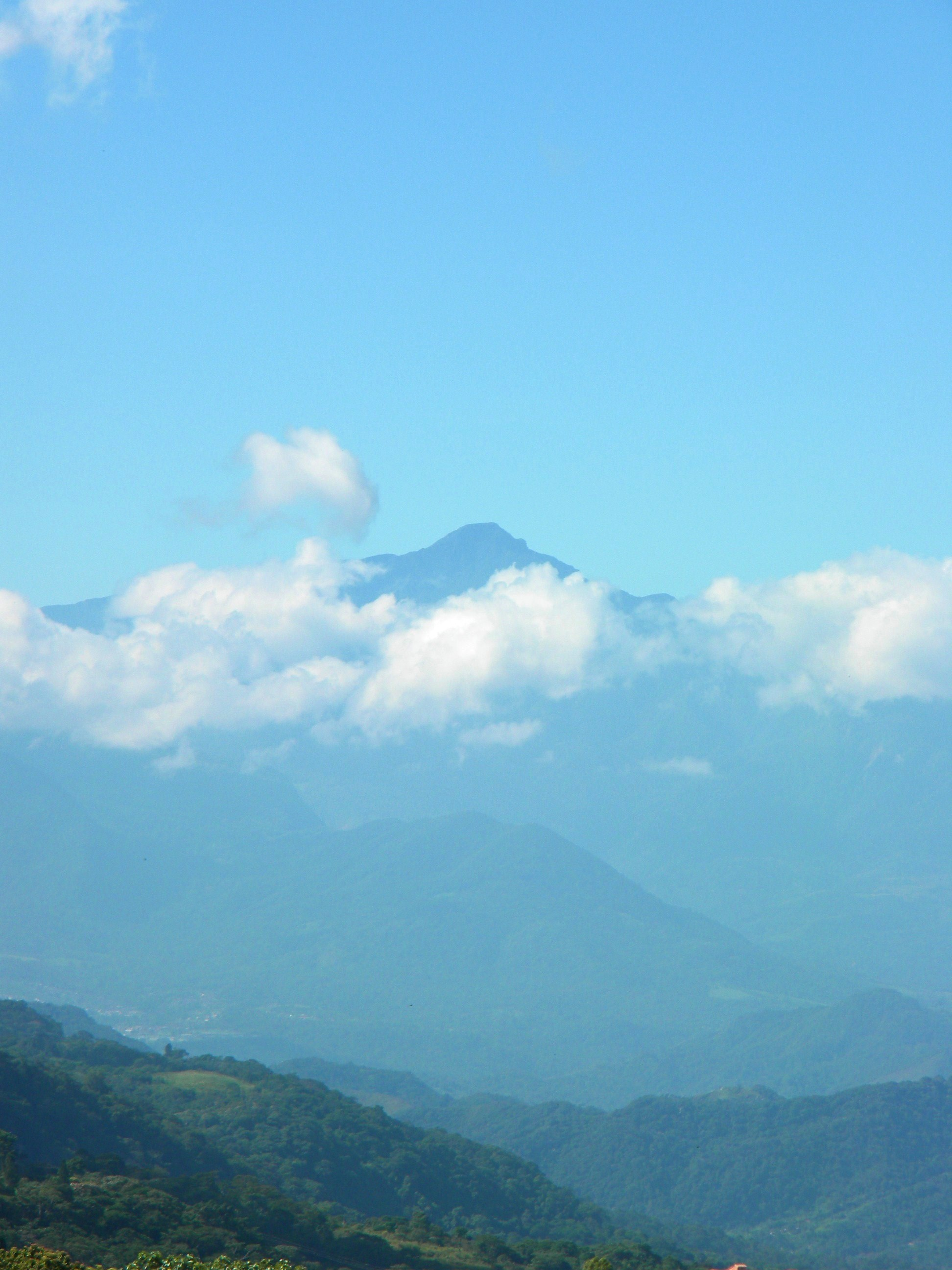
Another View
