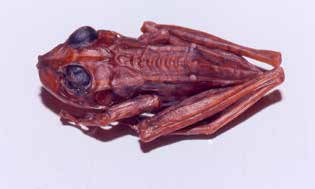
- Holotype, and the only known specimen, now in the collections of the Museum of Biology, Central University of Venezuela

Conservation status
- Vulnerable (IUCN 3.1)

Scientific classification
- Kingdom: Animalia
- Phylum: Chordata
- Class: Amphibia
- Order: Anura
- Family: Hemiphractidae
- Genus: Stefania
- Species: S. breweri

Binomial name
- Stefania breweri Barrio-Amorós and Fuentes, 2003
- S. breweri is only known from its type locality, the summit of Cerro Autana in Venezuela

= Stefania breweri =

Species of amphibian

Stefania breweri, also known as Brewer's carrying frog (in Spanish rana stefania de Brewer), is a species of frog in the family Hemiphractidae. It is endemic to Cerro Autana, Venezuela, and only known from a single specimen (holotype). It was named for Venezuelan explorer Charles Brewer-Carías.

== Description ==
The holotype, of unknown sex, measures 50 mm (2.0 in) in snout–vent length (the specimen is somewhat dehydrated was not dissected to avoid damage). The snout is subacuminate in dorsal view and truncate in profile. The canthus rostralis is distinct and straight. The tympanum is distinct with an ossified annulus. The supra-tympanic fold is narrow but distinct. Skin is smooth. The fingers have small discs and no webbing. The toes have small discs and basal webbing. The preserved specimen is dorsally pale orange. A pale white inter-orbital bar is present. The flanks are whitish with a few dark brown bars. The throat, chest, and belly are uniformly pinkish.

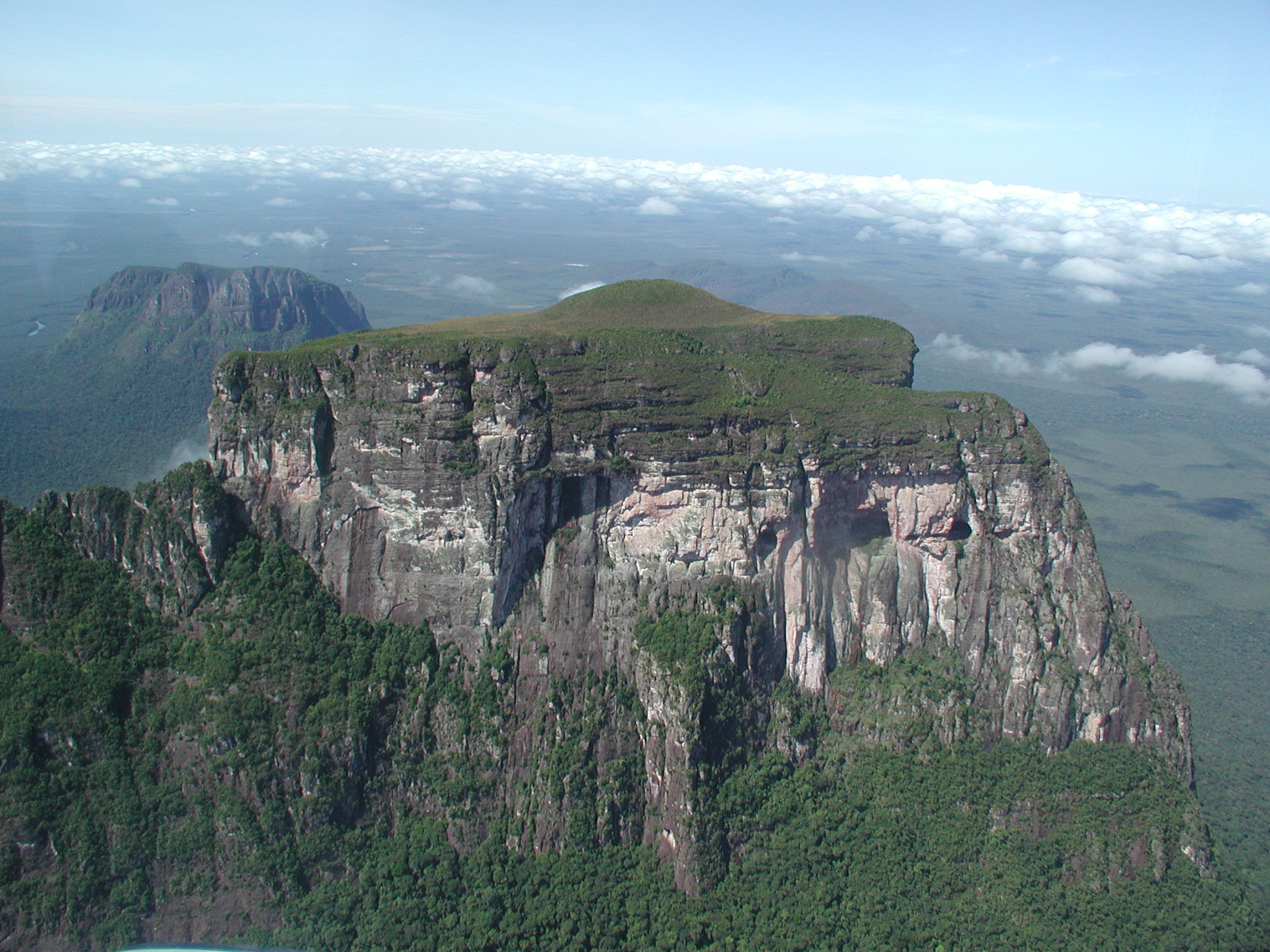
Cerro Autana as seen from north.

== Habitat and conservation ==
This species is only known from the holotype that was collected in 1971 from the top of Cerro Autana at 1,250 m (4,100 ft) above sea level, during the first expedition to this tepui. The summit is dominated by an open swampy landscape with submesothermic herbaceous vegetation. The dominant plants are Brocchinia hechtioides and Kunhardtia rhodantha. The specimen was found within the tubular rolled leaves of a Brocchinia bromeliad. The only other amphibian known from the summit is Leptodactylus lithonaetes.

Stefania breweri has not been observed by two later expeditions to Cerro Autana, in 1972 and in 2001. The International Union for Conservation of Nature (IUCN) and the Venezuelan Fauna Red List have both assessed S. breweri as vulnerable. Barrio-Amorós and colleagues (2019) suggest that it should rather be classified as "critically endangered" because only single specimen is known (despite later expeditions involving herpetologists) and because the available habitat is very restricted (the summit is 1.9 km²).
