= Train to Copenhagen =

Train to Copenhagen was an international communications campaign organised in connection with the United Nations Climate Change Conference, COP15, which took place in Copenhagen in December 2009. It was done in cooperation with the United Nations (UN) 'Seal the Deal' campaign, encouraging decision makers to reach an agreement at COP 15.

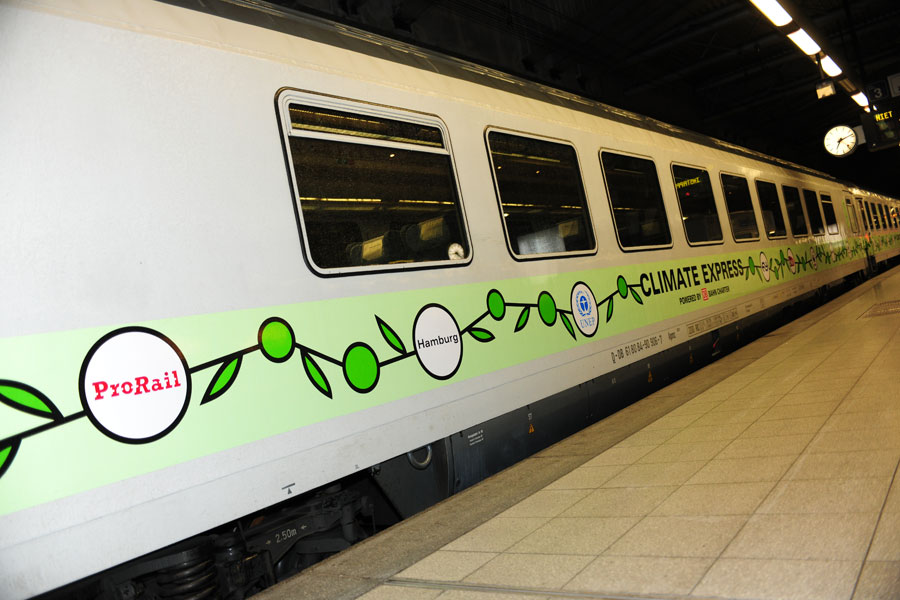
Climate Express

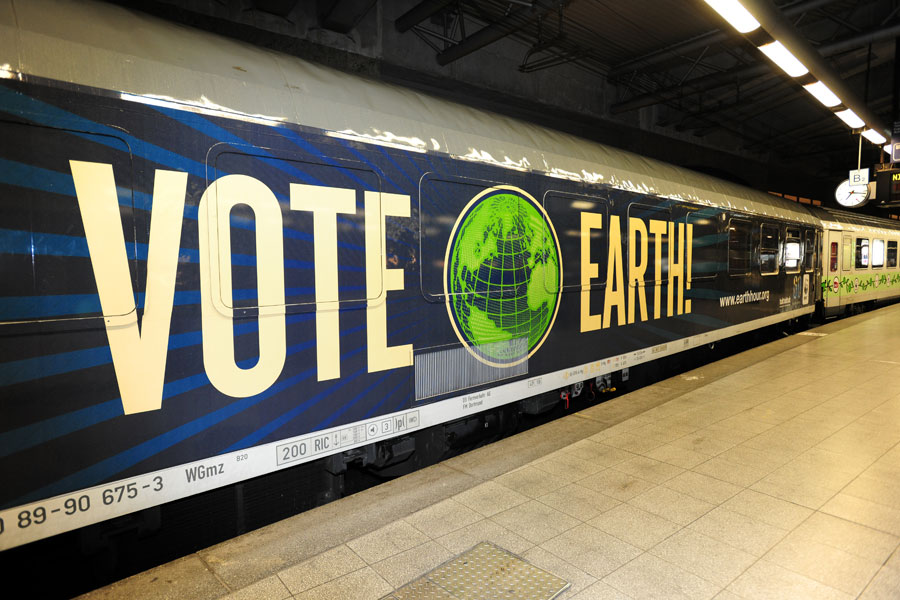
Climate Express

According to the organisers, the objectives were to promote an agreement on climate change in Copenhagen and to increase the awareness, among the delegates and media, of the transportation sector’s impact on climate change. The International Union of Railways (UIC) and its partners aimed to ensure that rail transport is accepted as a solution to curb CO_{2} growth by actually demonstrating that a train trip is a low-carbon alternative to other modes of transportation.

The UIC and its Train to Copenhagen partners provided a framework for the campaign, including a cooperation with UN and its "Seal the Deal" campaign, and encouraged the UIC members to organize national campaigns.

A central element of the campaign was the Climate Express running from Brussels to Copenhagen on 5 December 2009. The train was the platform for a large number of on-board activities. Presentations, exhibitions, testimonials, interviews and a press conference with the international press were organized. The passengers were delegates, media/press, NGOs and intergovernmental organizations.

A symbolic journey from Kyoto to Copenhagen was also undertaken. This train journey between two climate treaties, the Kyoto agreement and the forthcoming one of Copenhagen, demonstrated how to reduce emissions in a crucial sector. It was possible to follow the adventures made by the travel team, their experiences and observations on the changes due to global warming on the Train to Copenhagen website.

Approximately a quarter of greenhouse gas emissions come from the transportation sector, and it is the sector where there has been the highest growth in these emissions the last decades. UIC has developed the www.ecopassenger.org and www.ecotransit.org tools to increase the awareness among transportation users about the consequences of their daily travel choices.
