= Ayodele Odusola =

South African diplomat

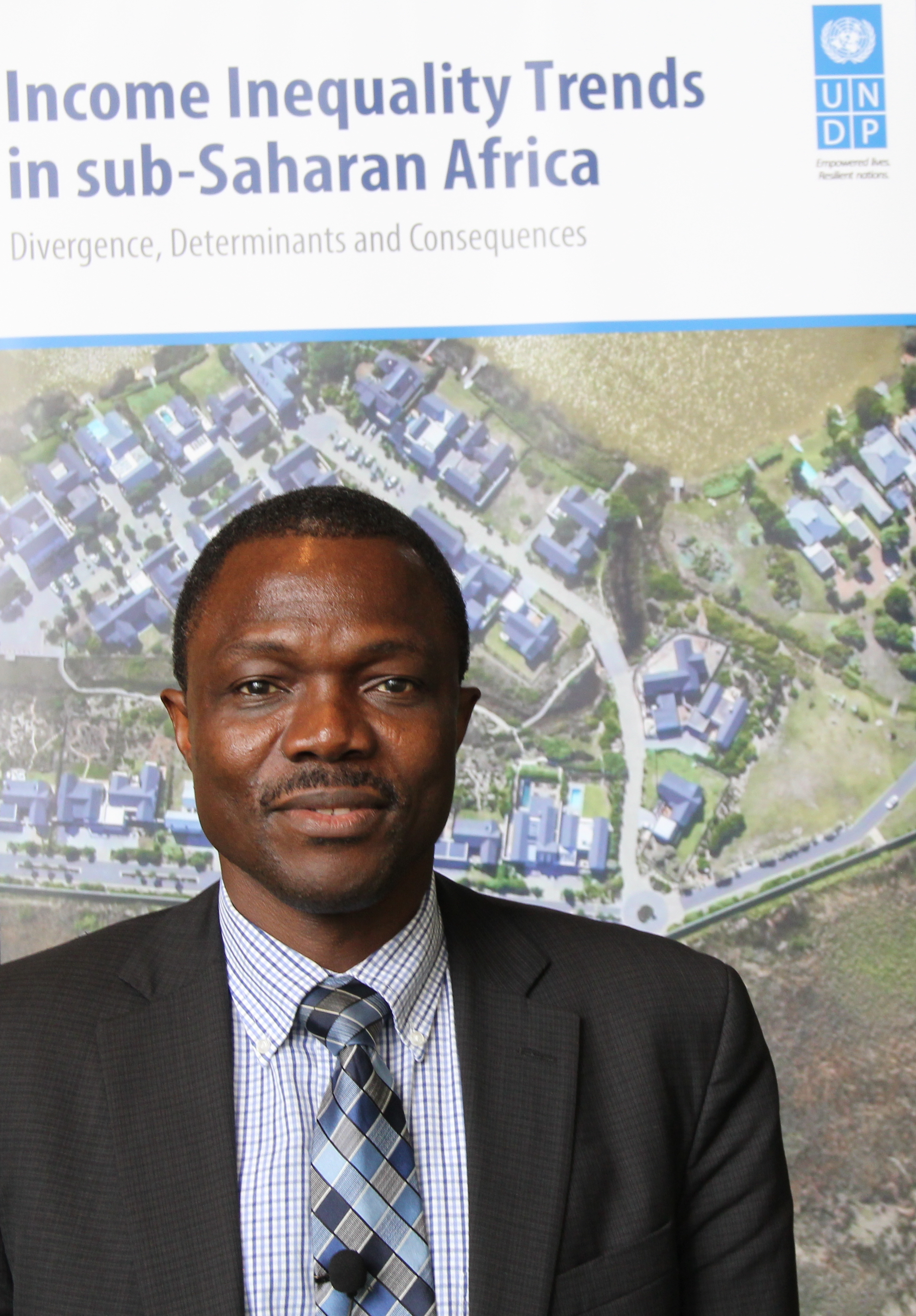
Odusola in 2017

Ayodele Odusola is a South African diplomat. He is the Resident Representative for the United Nations Development Programme (UNDP) in South Africa.

== Biography ==
Prior, Odusola was Chief Economist and Head of the Strategy and Analysis Team for UNDP's Regional Bureau for Africa. Before his appointment as Chief Economist for UNDP Africa, Odusola served as the Millennium Development Goals (MDGs) Adviser for Sub-Saharan Africa, after his tenure as Economic Adviser in UNDP South Africa, where he played a key role in developing partnerships on the MDGs and in publishing the National and Provincial MDG and Human Development Reports. Before his time in South Africa, he was a Senior Economist in UNDP Nigeria, supporting the preparation of fiscal responsibility legislation; national and local economic empowerment and development strategies; local, regional and national MDGs; human development reports; and national development plans and visions.

Odusola worked with the Presidency of Nigeria before joining the United Nations, where he served as Head of the Research and Macroeconomic Training Programme under Nigeria's National Centre for Economic Management and Administration.

In December 2021, Odusola published "Africa's Agricultural Renaissance: From Paradox to Powerhouse".

== Academic career ==
Odusola has published over 50 articles in national and international journals, editing and authoring books and technical reports. Dr Odusola is the lead author and one of the co-editors of the UNDP Africa publication "Income Inequality in sub-Saharan Africa: Divergence, Determinants and Consequences", which was launched during the meeting of the United Nations General Assembly, in 2017.

Odusola obtained his PhD from University of Ibadan, Nigeria. In 2001, he was the African Visiting Scholar to the International Monetary Fund.
