= Inírida =

Inírida may refer to:

- Inírida, Guainía, the capital city and a municipality of the Guainía Department in Colombia
- Inírida River, a major tributary of the Guaviare River in the Guainía Department in Colombia
- Inírida flower, an endemic plant in Colombia, scientific names Schoenocephalium teretifolium and Guacamaya superba
