= COP 15 =

COP 15 may refer to:

- 2009 United Nations Climate Change Conference
- 2021/2022 Convention on Biological Diversity Conference
  - 2022 United Nations Biodiversity Conference
