= Cerro Autana =

Mountain in Venezuela

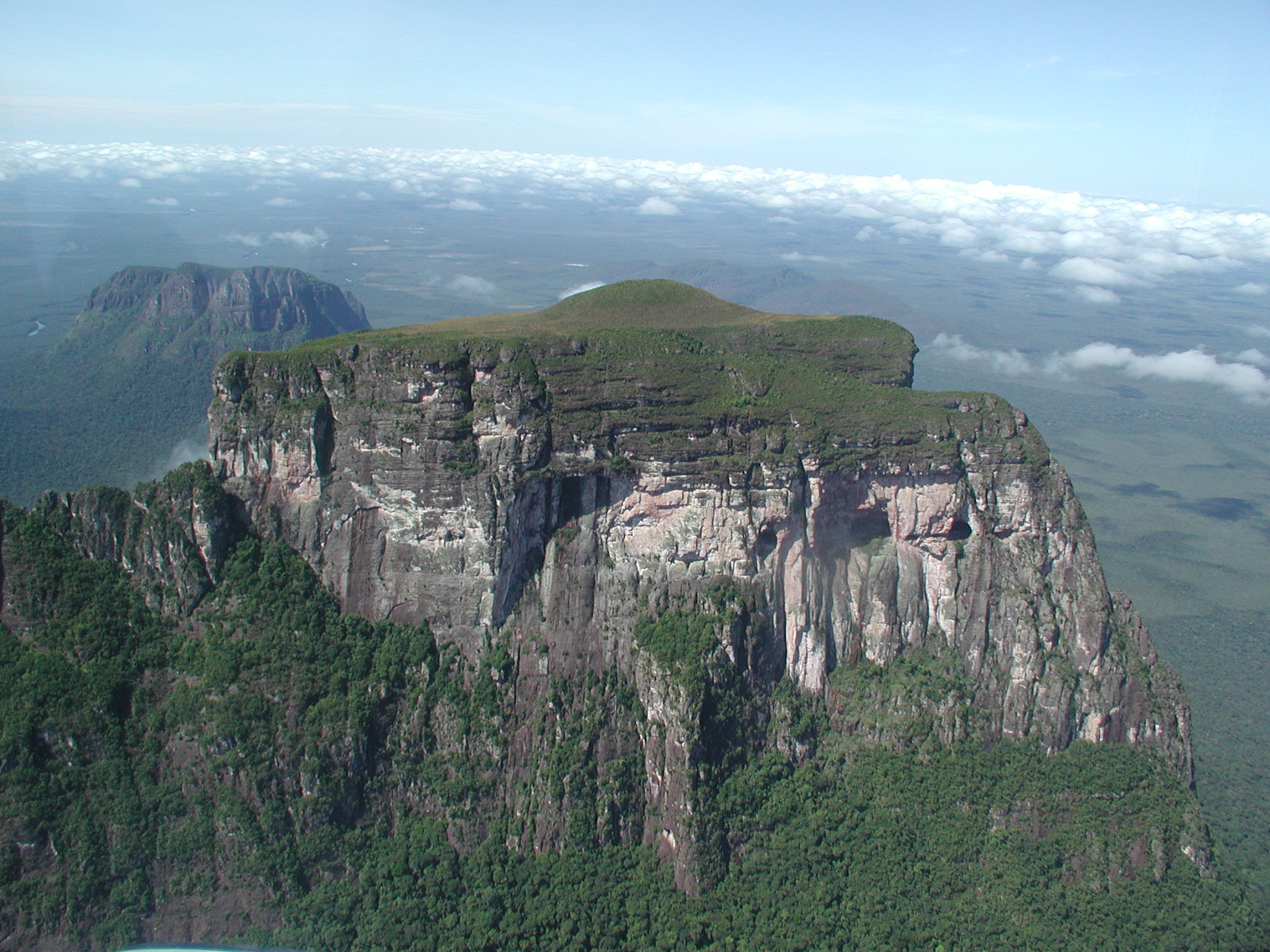
- Cerro Autana, northern exposure. The entrances to the caves are seen on the right side below the line of vegetation.

Highest point
- Elevation: 1,220 m (4,000 ft)
- Coordinates: 04°51′33.61″N 67°27′05.51″W

Geography
- Location within Venezuela
- Country: Venezuela
- State: Amazonas
- Monumento Natural Cerro Autana
- IUCN category III (natural monument or feature)
- Area: 90.82 km^{2} (35.07 sq mi)
- Designation: Natural Monument
- Designated: 1978
- Administrator: Instituto Nacional de Parques (INPARQUES)

Cerro Autana (Autana Mountain) is a geological formation located at the western portion of the Guiana Shield in the Estado Amazonas, Venezuela near the Colombian border. It is characterized by a narrow base, a flat top, and almost vertical walls. Its top is at approximately 1,220 metres (4,000 ft). It belongs to the formations known as tepuis which are characteristic flat-top mountains of the Guiana Shield. Cerro Autana (Wahari-Kuawai) plays the role of the "tree of life" in the oral history and lore of the Piaroa Indians who inhabit the region.

The first Europeans to visit the region around Cerro Autana were Alexander von Humboldt and Aimé Bonpland in 1800. During 1852-1854 Richard Spruce and Alfred Russel Wallace made numerous observations and botanical collections. Cerro Autana is the landmark of the region of Autana which encompasses the Cerro Autana itself, a smaller adjacent mountain often referred to as the “Autanita”, the Cuao, Autana, and Umaj-ajé rivers and Lake Leopoldo. Cerro Autana was declared a natural monument in 1978, including part of the Autana River and Lake Leopoldo. The natural monument protects an area of 90.82 km^{2}. The mountain is also known internationally for big wall climbing and exotic BASE jumping.

== Description ==
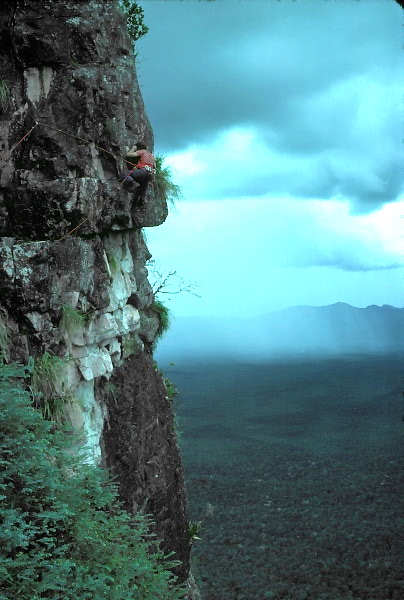
Steve Platt on North Ridge, Autana 1974

Cerro Autana like other table-top mountains in the region is the remains of a large sandstone plateau that once covered the granite basement complex between the north border of the Amazon Basin and the Orinoco, between the Atlantic coast and the Rio Negro. The table-mountain topography is formed as water percolates along joints and bedding planes, the siliceous cement dissolves, quartzite disaggregates, and large blocks collapse which accumulate in the foot of the scarps. The percolating water forms large and intricate cave systems, which frequently emerge in the scarp zone as high waterfalls.

Although composed of nearly horizontal strata of sandstone, Autana contains caves and other karst formations, which are rare in rocks other than limestones. These formations are the result of the dissolution of cemented sandstone which contain parts with certain ratios of limestone and parts with a higher proportion of calcium carbonate. This process leaves large empty spaces which in Cerro Autana form interconnected caverns and a lounge with a domed ceiling. This vaulted living room has two unequal openings that pierce the hill from side to side and lean out as a form of balcony in the vertical walls of the mountain. One of these openings, although elongated, is so small that it is indistinguishable from below. Some of the cavernous passages have collapsed in recent years. A particular alumino-nitrate found in the main cave is sveite, named after the Sociedad Venezolana de Espeleologia whose members collected the first samples.

The caves were first reached by Charles Brewer-Carías and David Nott in 1970 when they landed on the summit by helicopter and descended using ropes and a caving ladder. It was first climbed by Stephen Platt, David Nott, Wilmer Perez, and Carlos Reyes in 1974 via the 2,000-foot (610 m) North Ridge. The ascent took three days and the party spent four days mapping the caves before descending by abseil. A team of skydivers and filmmakers made tandem parachute jumps onto the summit in 1985, producing a documentary called "Skydive to Autana".

== Flora and fauna ==
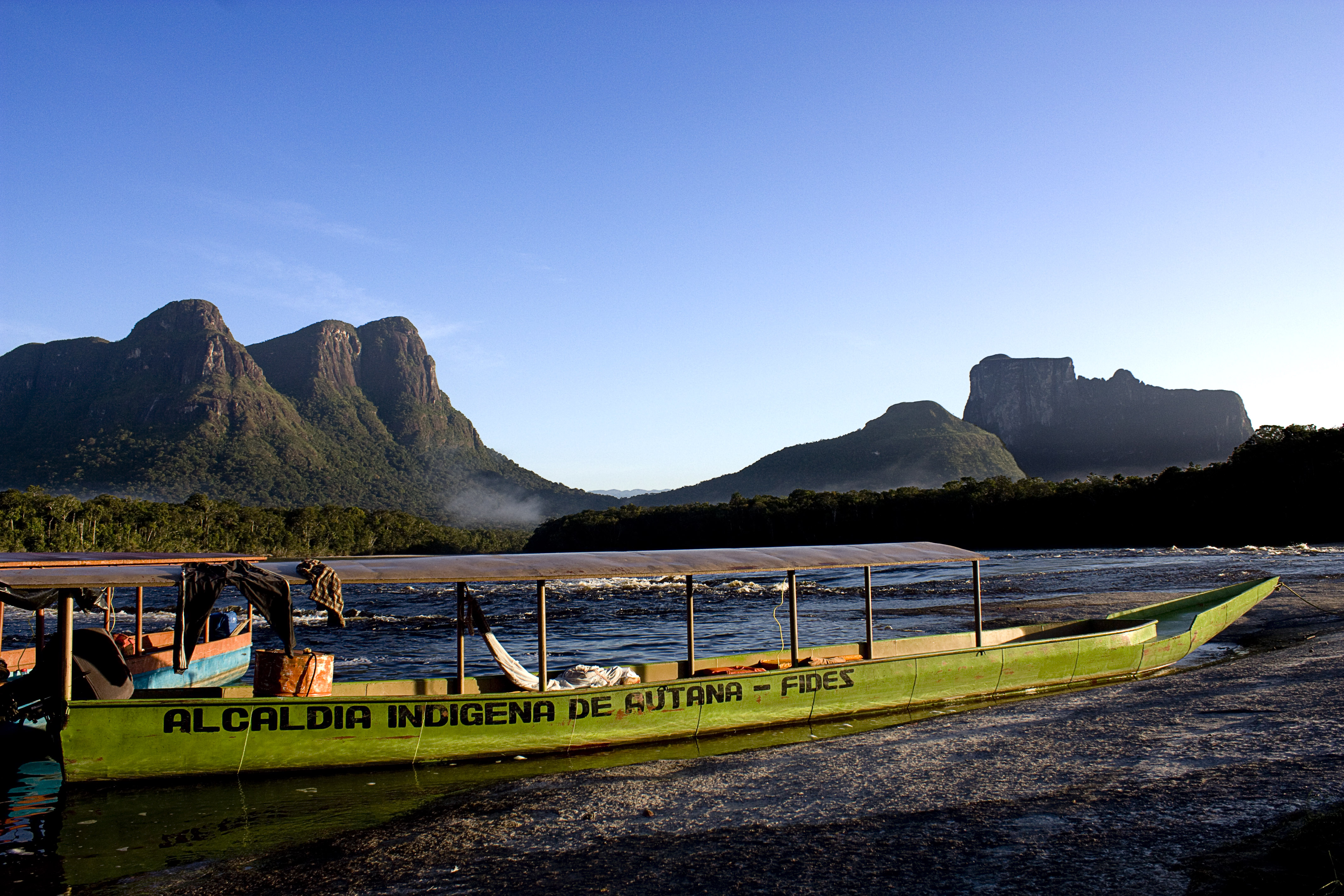
Cerro Autana in Amazonas state, Venezuela.

Typical of other tepui formations, the open rock surfaces are inhabited by collections of plant communities which include algae, lichens, mosses and low herbs. The vertical walls are covered by colonies of bromeliads. The greater portion of the summit is covered mainly by open treeless vegetation, savanna-like in appearance. Some forests with trees varying in height from 2.5–10 meters are scattered along portions of the margins. Despite the relatively small area comprising the summit, a number of different habitats and ecological microclimates are manifest.

Only two species of amphibians are known from the summit: Leptodactylus lithonaetes and Stefania breweri. The latter is endemic to Cerro Autana and is only known from a single specimen collected in 1971.

== Mythology ==
For the Piaroa Indians, the original inhabitants of the area, Autana is a sacred mountain (Wahari-Kuawai in the Piaroan language). It is Kuaimayojo, the stump of 'the sacred tree of the fruits of the world'. Piaroan mythology tells how '-the tree-top went as high as the infinite, and its branches were full of fruits which fell and gave life to the Amazon'. One day Wahari (a God) and his nephew Ruayei, which had been transformed into a lapa (Cuniculus paca), cut down the tree to get all the fruits at once. Ruayei gnawed on the base until the tree fell. The branches that fell to the north formed the forests of the Cuao River; the branches falling to the west made the mountains of Sipapo, Waichij and the Uripikai. Farther away, the course of the waters was changed and a lake (Autana/Leopoldo) was formed on top of the mountains east of Autana. In one of the rivers, a payara fish (Hydrolycus scomberoides) was trapped. Trying to escape, the fish leaped higher and higher, hitting the stump of the Wahari-Kuawai, forming the caves of Autana. Finally, the payara crossed through the mountain and formed the Great Cave, which is also called the Payara Inlet, before leaping free into the Umaj-Ajé River.

== See also ==
- Gran Sabana
