= 2024 United Nations Biodiversity Conference =

United Nations Biodiversity Conference COP16
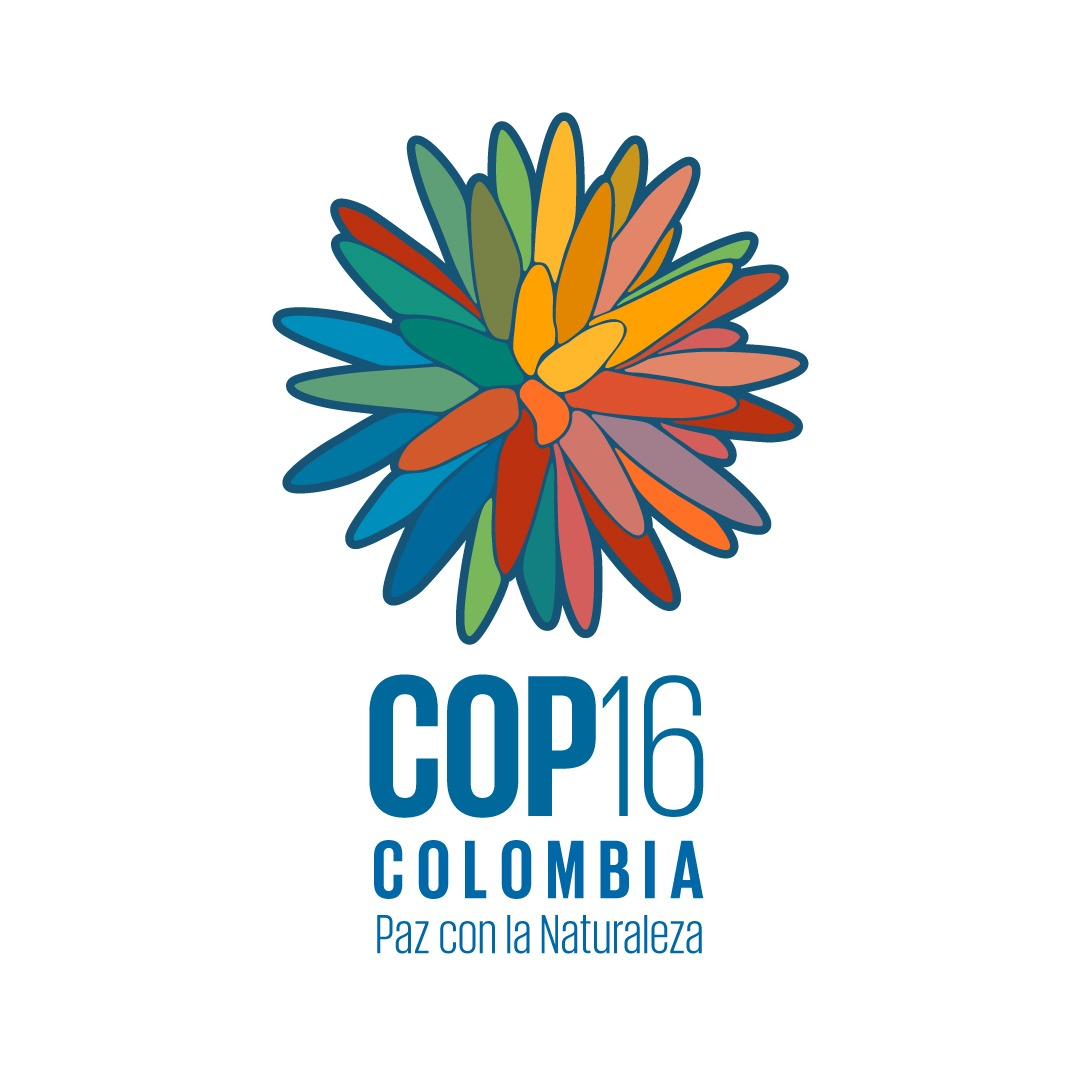
- COP16 logo depicting an Inírida flower
- Date: 21 October – 1 November 2024 (original session); 25–27 February 2025 (extended session)
- Motto: Paz con la Naturaleza (Peace with Nature)
- Cities: Cali, Valle del Cauca, Colombia (original session); Rome, Lazio, Italy (extended session)
- Participants: Convention on Biological Diversity member countries
- Follows: ← Kunming/Montreal 2022
- Precedes: → Armenia 2026
- Website: https://www.cbd.int/conferences/2024

The 2024 United Nations Biodiversity Conference of the Parties (COP16) to the UN Convention on Biological Diversity (CBD) was a conference that was held from 21 October to 1 November 2024, in Cali, Colombia. The monitoring framework agreed at the previous conference should allow the progress of the countries towards national goals and targets under the Kunming-Montreal Global Biodiversity Framework to be evaluated.

Following a partial collapse in the original negotiations, an extended session of the COP16 was held in Rome, Italy, from 25 to 27 February 2025, as the participating nations eventually agreed on a roadmap to provide developing countries with US$200 billion a year to finance the implementation of conservation targets by 2030.

== History ==
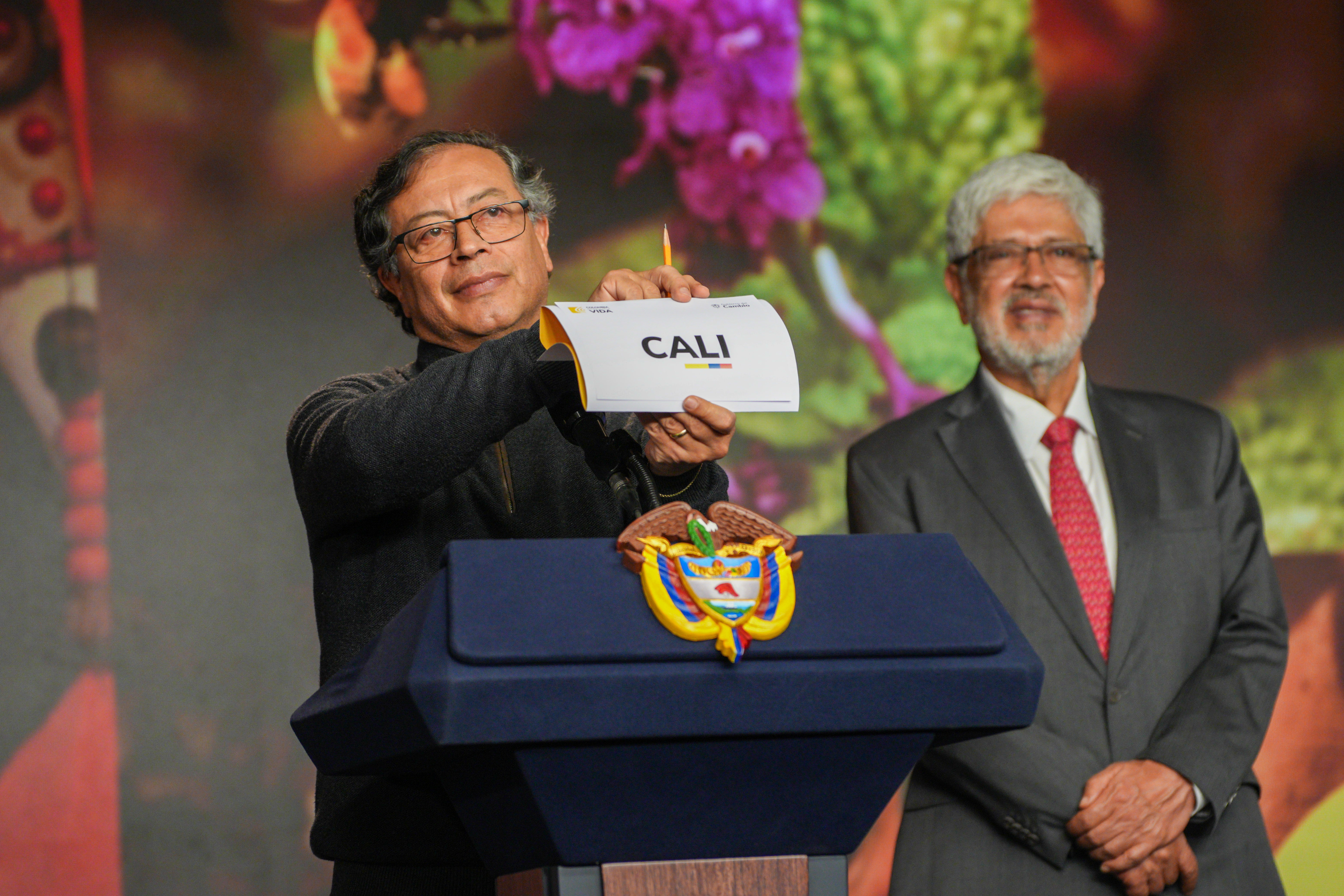
President of Colombia, Gustavo Petro, announces the city of Cali as the host for the United Nations Biodiversity COP16.

The UNCBD COP16 was originally set to be held in Turkey; however, on 31 July 2023, the conference's organizing committee notified Parties that the country had decided to give up its right to host and preside the event, due to "a force majeure situation" caused by the impact of the nationwide earthquakes that struck in February of the same year.

On 11 December 2023, the Minister of Environment and Sustainable Development of Colombia, Susana Muhamad, announced that the country had officially offered to host the COP16, which was scheduled to be held from 21 October to 1 November 2024. On 20 February 2024, the President of Colombia, Gustavo Petro, announced that Cali had been chosen to host the event, after a month-long competition with Bogotá. Petro said that Valle del Cauca was "the most biodiverse region in Colombia", both due its natural ecosystems and its ethnic diversity, while noting that the government had also chosen Cali in the hopes of "healing the open wounds" of the nationwide protests the city had been at the center of in 2021.

== Logo and motto ==
Sculpture of the Flor de Inírida in Cali

The COP16's official logo was presented by the Minister of Environment and Sustainable Development of Colombia, Susana Muhamad, and the interim executive secretary of the UNCBD, David Cooper, on 28 February 2024, during the Sixth UN Environment Assembly in Nairobi, Kenya. Designed by Vanessa María Vergara Domínguez, the logo depicted an Inírida flower, an endemic plant in Colombia, decorated with 36 petals, 23 of which represented the targets set by the Kunming-Montreal Global Biodiversity Framework in 2022, whereas the remaining 13 symbolized the country's strategic ecoregions.

The official motto of the COP16 was Paz con la Naturaleza ("Peace with Nature"); Muhamad said that one of the reasons behind the choice was the hope to turn the conference into an opportunity to further reduce the impact of the nationwide conflict with guerrilla factions, which was still ongoing despite the agreement reached as part of the peace process between the Colombian government and the Revolutionary Armed Forces of Colombia in 2016.

== Development ==
=== Context and lead-up ===
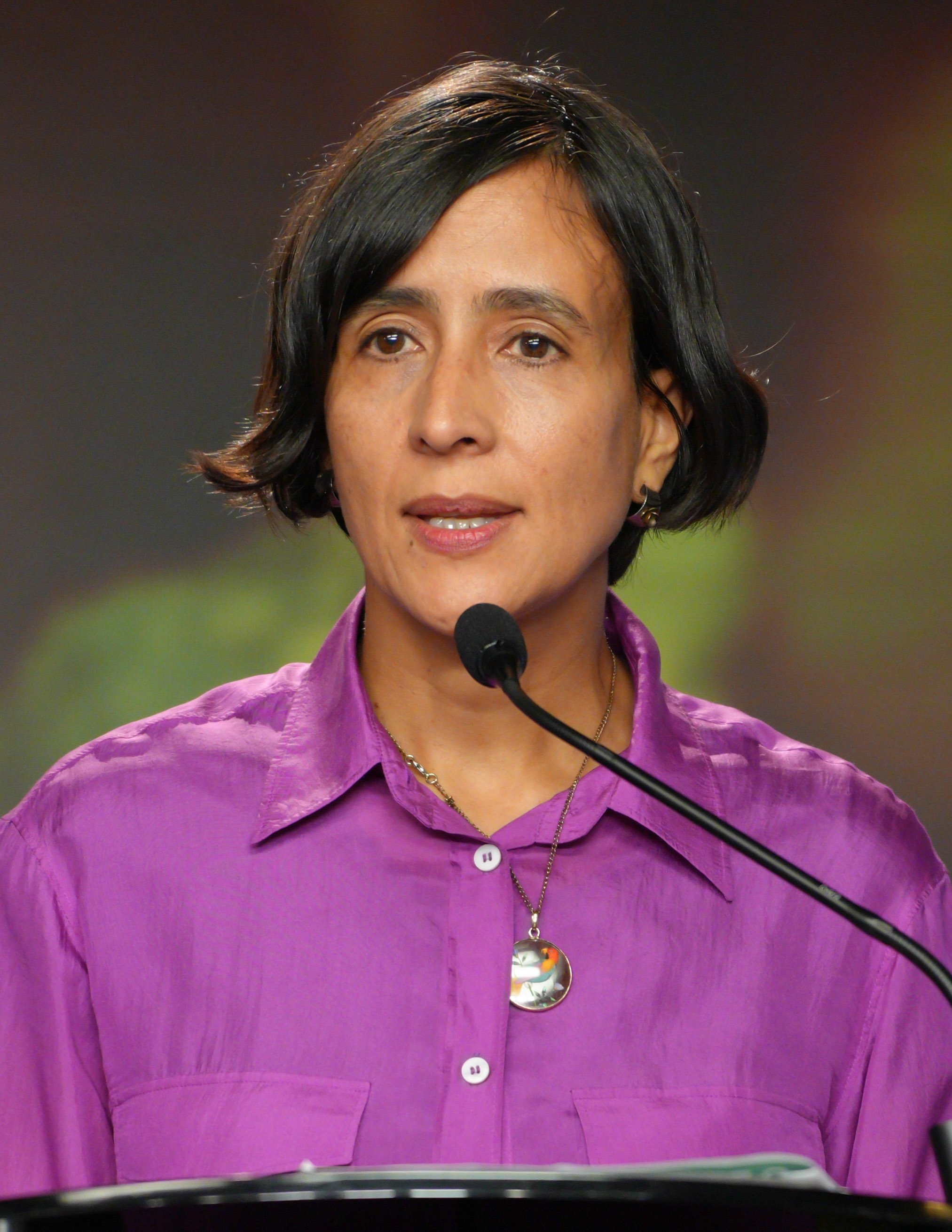
Colombia's Minister of Environment and Sustainable Development, Susana Muhamad, served as the President of the COP16 throughout the entirety of its negotiations.

==== Main themes of the summit ====
The UNCBD COP16 mainly aimed to review progress of the countries towards the goals set by the Kunming-Montreal Global Biodiversity Framework (GBF), which had been approved in December 2022, having set 23 general targets to "halt and reverse biodiversity loss" by 2030.

In the lead-up to the summit, national governments were expected to present their respective long-term strategies to meet the targets, known as National Biodiversity Strategies and Action Plans (NBSAPs); however, a joint investigation by The Guardian and Carbon Brief revealed that only 25 of the 195 countries that had adhered to the Kunming-Montreal Framework had submit their NBSAPs before the start of the COP16. According to the inquiry, only five of the 17 megadiverse countries (Australia, China, Indonesia, Malaysia and Mexico), as well as four G7 nations (Canada, France, Italy and Japan), submitted their respective NBSAPs by the deadline. Representatives for Colombia announced that the country would present its own plan during the meeting, while spokespersons for the United Kingdom, Brazil and India stated that the nations would not publish their respective NBSAPs earlier than 2025.

The COP16 was also considered as an occasion to review other goals set at the previous conference in Montreal, including an agreement to provide developing countries with at least US$20 billion to finance the implementation of conservation targets by 2025, and at least $30 billion a year by 2030. Another target included in the Global Biodiversity Framework urged countries to identify funding to nature-damaging sources and cut them by $500 billion a year by the end of the decade. Upon the start of the meeting, only seven developed countries had contributed to the Global Biodiversity Framework Fund (GBFF), donating a total of $244 million.

Moreover, participating countries were expected to negotiate the first global agreement on digital sequence information and biopiracy, a phenomenon that had been disproportionately affecting countries in the Global South, and ensure the full involvement of Indigenous peoples around the world, which had been mentioned eighteen times on the GBF, in the implementation of the targets set by the Framework itself. Finally, a draft of a global action plan on biodiversity and health was reportedly set to be negotiated at the conference.

Upon being asked about the likelihood that the United States would ratify the convention, having previously refused to do so, the executive secretary of the Convention on Biological Diversity, Astrid Schomaker, said that while the US were "always participating at the COPs with reasonably big delegations", ratification had not been an "actively discussed" subject in the country, regardless of the outcome of the 2024 presidential election, due to a lack of support from a solid majority of Congress.

Schomaker also said that the COP16 would be "the biggest COP ever", thanks to the involvement of a higher number of stakeholders and national delegates, as well as an increase in international media coverage; she also noted how the meeting would be an opportunity for institutions to acknowledge that "we cannot solve the climate crisis without looking at the nature crisis".

==== Killings of environmental activists ====
According to a yearly Global Witness report about victims of violence and repression against environmental activism, released in September 2024, 196 environmentalists and activists around the world had been murdered throughout 2023. Colombia topped the list for the second year in a row, with 79 killings (19 more than the year prior), followed by Brazil, with 25 killings, and by Mexico and Honduras, with 18 killings per each. Global Witness said that organized crime groups had been linked to around half of all environmental defender murders in Colombia in 2023, while noting that half of the activists killed in Colombia were Indigenous, with many others being either members of Afro-descendant communities or small-scale farmers.

The report also raised concerns about growing repression and censorship of protests led by environmentalist associations in several countries, including the United Kingdom, France, Italy, Germany and the Netherlands.

==== Security concerns ====
Following the termination of a ceasefire between the Colombian government and some factions of the guerrilla movement Estado Mayor Central (EMC) in March and July 2024, due to ongoing violence in several departments, on 16 July representatives of the EMC threatened that the COP16 would "fail even if [Cali] was militarized with (US) gringos" in an X post directed to President Gustavo Petro. In the wake of further threats by the EMC and failed terrorist attacks in Cali and Jamundí, it was reported that thousands of members of the Army and the National Police were expected to be deployed in Cali to ensure the safety of delegates and citizens. On 30 July, the leader of the EMC, Néstor Gregorio (also known by the nom de guerre Iván Mordisco), announced that the units of the group would not affect any events related to the COP16 "as a gesture of [their] will for peace".

The executive secretary of the Convention on Biological Diversity, Astrid Schomaker, said that her staff had "worked very closely" with national, regional and local authorities to arrange effective security arrangements for the COP16.

=== Negotiations ===
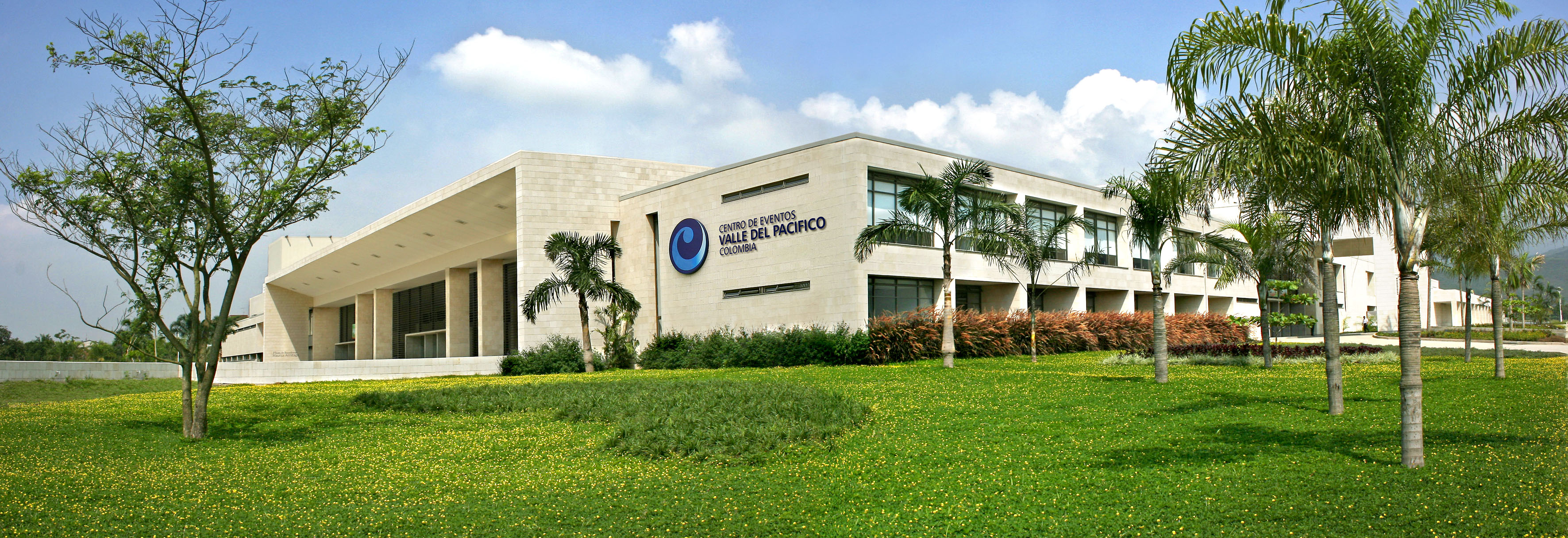
The Valle del Pacifico convention center in Cali, where the negotiations for the 2024 United Nations Biodiversity COP16 were held.

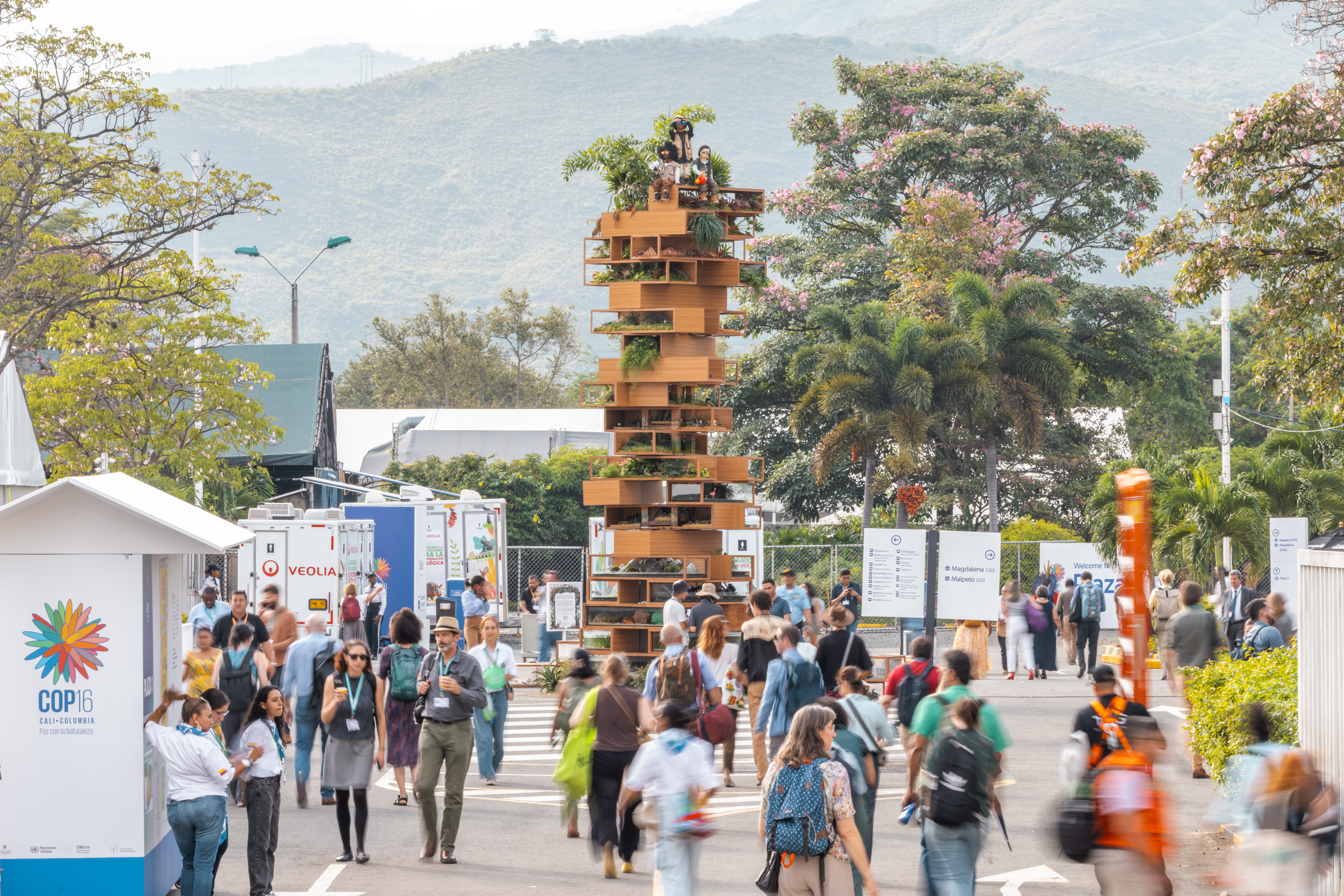
A 6m tall "Biodiversity Jenga" monument, created by artist Benjamin Von Wong, inside the Valle del Pacifico Convention center in Cali, during the COP16 Biodiversity Conference.

The Minister of Environment and Sustainable Development of Colombia, Susana Muhamad, served as the president of the COP16 throughout the entirety of its negotiations, which were held in the Zona Azul ("Blue Zone") at the Valle del Pacifico convention center in Cali; participants from civil society were admitted to the Zona Verde ("Green Zone") at the Bulevar del Río, which would host several concerts, as well as a series of political and academic conferences about conservation and restoration of oceans, environmental justice and sustainable cities, among other themes.

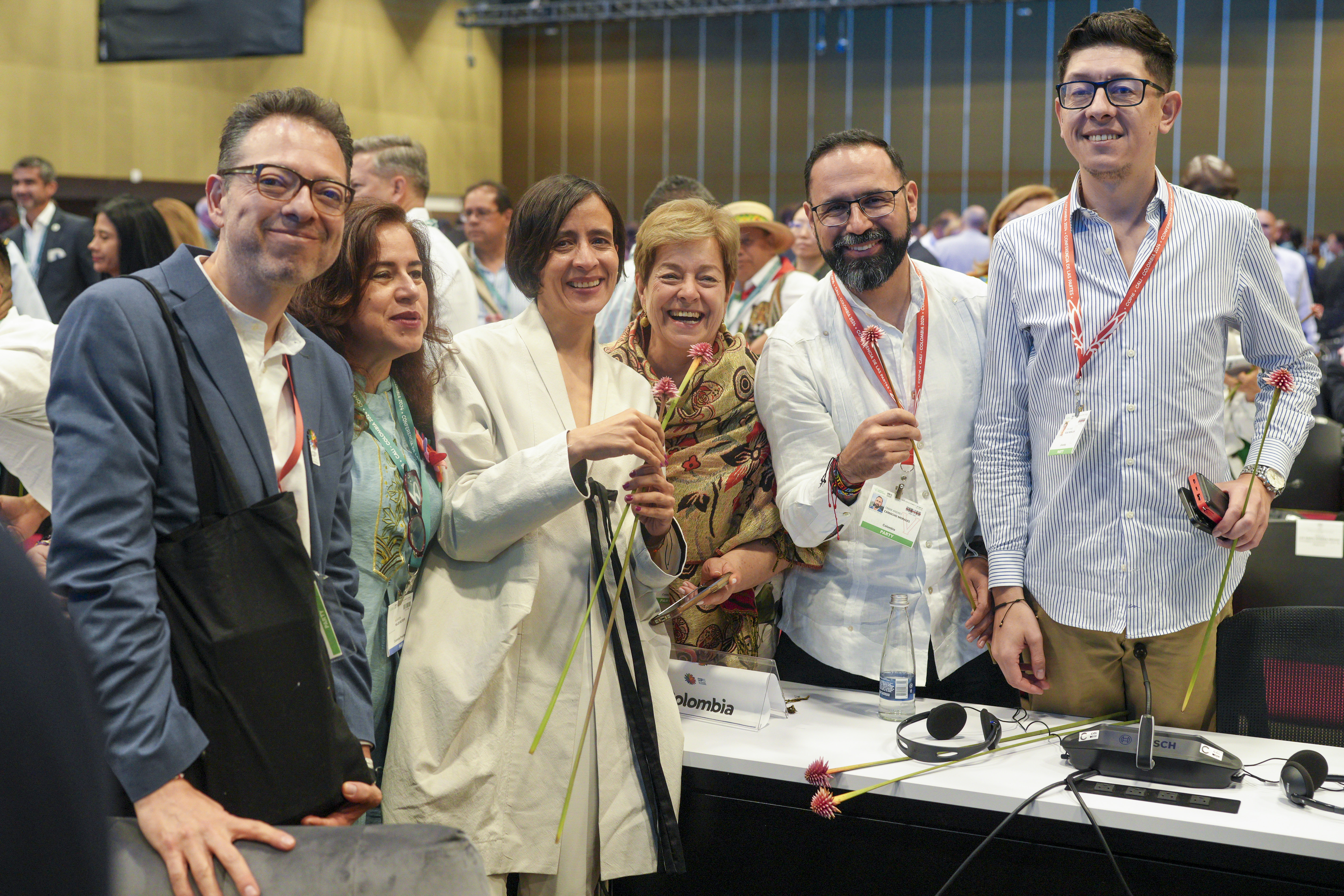
Susana Muhamad (third from left) and members of the Colombian delegation pose for a photo at the opening ceremony of the COP16.

On 21 October 2024, the inaugural day of the meeting, Muhamad presented Colombia's own NBSAP, called Plan de Acción por la Biodiversidad 2030 ("Plan of Action for Biodiversity 2030"). The document — which was estimated to require a total investment of 76.5 billion pesos, roughly corresponding to over US$17.8 billion — set six national goals and 191 targets needed to fulfill the 2022 Global Biodiversity Framework by the end of the decade. The opening ceremony included public speeches by Muhamad and Petro, as well as the major counselor of the National Indigenous Organization of Colombia (ONIC), Orlando Rayo, and a video-message from the secretary-general of the United Nations, António Guterres, who urged participating diplomats to "go from words to facts" in order to fulfill the targets set by the Kunming-Montreal Global Biodiversity Framework.

While the COP16 was taking place, a group of researchers from the Natural History Museum in London presented an independent analysis on the effectiveness of conservation practices worldwide, which showed that, on average, biodiversity intactness had declined globally between 2000 and 2020, diminishing more quickly in places that are considered to be protected areas than in critical biodiversity areas that were not protected; the study also estimated that 17.5% of land and 8.4% of marine areas were protected for nature – an increase of about half a percentage point each since the COP15 in 2022 – with the total amount being expected to reach at least 30% by 2030, as part of one of the targets set by the GBF.

During the first week of the convention, representatives of Indigenous and Afro-descendant communities, as well as civil society associations, were involved in dedicated international forums. El Colombiano reported that five "key documents" related to the targets set by the Cartagena and Nagoya Protocols were adopted in the ending session of the week, while new preliminary agreements to reform wildlife conservation and sustainable practices within the agricultural, food and financial sectors were also reached.

Negotiations about a plan to provide developing countries with more resources for the implementation of conservation targets by 2030 reportedly kept stalling during the second week of the meeting, as a request by developing countries, including Brazil, to create a new fund for biodiversity, faced opposition by donating countries and the European Union. A spokesperson for the CBD committee, David Ainsworth, said that it was "obvious" that a complete agreement on the subject would not be reached by the end of COP16, with delegates being set to continue negotiations in the following period of time, as part of a new organization or an existent UN body. Some analysts and participants also noted how the funding for developing countries required by the GBF was "a drop in the sea" in comparison to incentives paid by governments to providers of nature-damaging sources.

== Final outcomes ==
=== Original session ===
The conference closed on 2 November 2024, with no agreement on a roadmap to ramp up funding for species protection. It was suspended as negotiations ran almost twelve hours longer than planned and delegates started leaving to catch flights. The exodus left the summit without a quorum for decision-making.

Delegates did agree earlier to form a subsidiary body for recognizing Indigenous peoples' role, including traditional environmental knowledge, in future decisions on conservation. The body is led by two co-chairs, one of which is nominated by UN parties of the regional group and the other nominated by indigenous peoples and local communities. The role of people of African descent in the protection of nature was also recognized.

An agreement was also reached earlier on charging large biotechnology companies who derive genetic information from living organisms with a 0.1% fee. The fee is to recognize that many life-saving medicines and genetic resources are derived from organisms living in biodiversity hotspots, such as the tropical rainforest. The collected fee was set to go into a newly established fund to protect nature, with 50% allocated towards Indigenous communities.

=== Extended session in Rome ===
An extended session of the COP16 was held in Rome, Italy, at the headquarters of the Food and Agriculture Organization, from 25 to 27 February 2025. The president of the conference, Susana Muhamad, took part in the meetings, despite having resigned from her role as Minister of Environment and Sustainable Development of Colombia on 9 February, in protests to cabinet appointments by President Gustavo Petro. Several countries did not send representatives to the session, including the United States, which had not signed up to the Convention on Biological Diversity and had just entered the second Trump administration, which was raising concerns over its plans to retreat from international environmental diplomacy and foreign aid.

Participating countries officially agreed to create the Cali Fund, which aimed to provide Indigenous peoples and countries with the highest concentration of biodiversity with financial compensation from biotech companies that had used digital sequence information (DSI) of native species for commercial purposes without permission. As part of the agreement, companies that met two of three criteria – sales of more than $50m (£39m), profits of more than $5m, and $20m in total assets – were expected to contribute 0.1% of profits generated from usage of DSI, or 1% of their revenue, towards the fund on a voluntary basis; half of all resources collected by the fund would be donated to Indigenous communities who were taking care of the most biodiverse ecosystems. The announcement of the Cali Fund received mixed reactions from environmentalist organizations: the WWF considered it a "good measure of environmental justice", whereas agroecologist association Centro Internazionale Crocevia criticized the agreement, expressing concerns over the voluntary nature of the fund and the risk of lacking resources for Indigenous communities.

On 28 February, it was announced that the participating countries had reached an agreement on a roadmap to provide developing countries with US$200 billion a year – roughly €192.5 billion – to finance the implementation of conservation targets by 2030, in compliance to the Kunming-Montreal Global Biodiversity Framework. The plan included commitment to raise US$20 billion in annual conservation financing by 2025, with the assets being set to rise to US$30 billion annually by 2030; according to the latest data collected at the time by the OECD, countries had managed to raise just US$15 billion towards the same goals. Ministers of finance and environment from all of the countries were also expected to hold an "international dialogue" to ensure the targets would be reached. The consequent progress would be reviewed at the COP17 in 2026, hosted by Armenia. The members of the BRICS group, and most specifically Brazil, reportedly played a central role in influencing the positive outcome of the negotiations; the Brazilian delegation, led by Maria Angélica Ikeda, was credited with putting forward a proposal that would become the basis of the final compromise.

On the other hand, negotiations on a new fund for nature finance were suspended and postponed to 2028, due to disagreements between the delegations involved on the status of the Global Environment Facility (GEF). Developing countries, including Brazil and the African Group, considered the GEF as too burdensome to access and over-representing wealthier nations, and demanded the creation of a newly established fund. hosted by COP committees. Developed countries, including the European Union, Japan and Canada, opposed the idea, arguing that multiple conservation funds could fragment international aid, while focusing on plausible efforts to broaden potential financial sources towards conservation, including private investments or the reform of environmentally harmful subsidies.

== See also ==
- Biodiversity loss
- Kunming-Montreal Global Biodiversity Framework
