= Monotrema =

Monotrema may refer to:

- Monotremes
- Monotrema (plant), a genus of plants in the family Rapateaceae
