= Amphiphyllum =

Scientific classification
- Kingdom: Plantae
- Clade: Tracheophytes
- Clade: Angiosperms
- Clade: Monocots
- Clade: Commelinids
- Order: Poales
- Family: Rapateaceae
- Genus: Amphiphyllum; Gleason
- Species: A. rigidum

Binomial name
- Amphiphyllum rigidum Gleason

Genus of flowering plants

Amphiphyllum is a group of plants in the family Rapateaceae described as a genus in 1931.

The only known species is Amphiphyllum rigidum, endemic to the Cerro Duida of Amazonas State in southern Venezuela.
