= Maschalocephalus =

Scientific classification
- Kingdom: Plantae
- Clade: Tracheophytes
- Clade: Angiosperms
- Clade: Monocots
- Clade: Commelinids
- Order: Poales
- Family: Rapateaceae
- Genus: Maschalocephalus; Gilg & K.Schum.
- Species: M. dinklagei

Binomial name
- Maschalocephalus dinklagei Gilg & K.Schum.

Genus of flowering plants

Maschalocephalus is a genus of plants in the family Rapateaceae first described in 1900.

As a disjunct, it is the only genus of the family outside of South America, as the genus's only known species is Maschalocephalus dinklagei, native to West Africa (Guinea, Ivory Coast, Liberia, Sierra Leone).

The genus name Maschalocephalus combines the Greek μασχάλη, maschalē ("axil") with κεφαλή, kephalē ("head"). The specific epithet dinklagei commemorates Max Julius Dinklage (1864-1935), a German consul in Monrovia and avid botanical specimens collector.
