= Cephalostemon =

Scientific classification
- Kingdom: Plantae
- Clade: Tracheophytes
- Clade: Angiosperms
- Clade: Monocots
- Clade: Commelinids
- Order: Poales
- Family: Rapateaceae
- Genus: Cephalostemon; R.H.Schomb.

Type species
- Cephalostemon gracilis (Poepp. & Endl.) R.H.Schomb.

Genus of flowering plants

Cephalostemon is a genus of flowering plants in the family Rapateaceae. It was described as a genus in 1845.

The genus is native to South America.

Species

- Cephalostemon affinis Körn - Amazonas, Tafelberg, Pará
- Cephalostemon angustatus Malme - Mato Grosso do Sul
- Cephalostemon gracilis (Poepp. & Endl.) R.H.Schomb. - Pará
- Cephalostemon microglochin Sandwith - Amazonas, Mato Grosso do Sul, Santa Cruz
- Cephalostemon riedelianus Körn - Minas Gerais, Goiás
