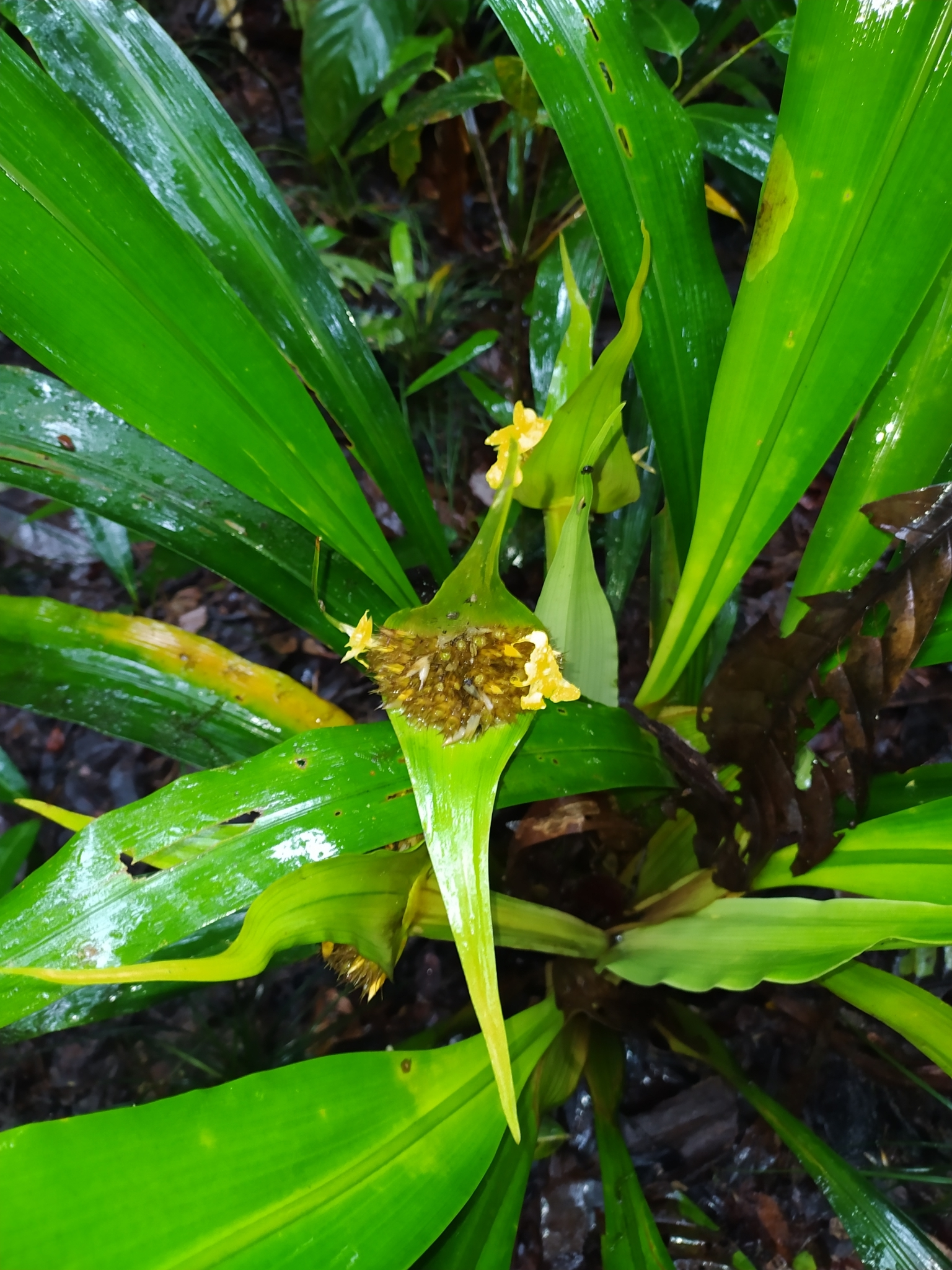
- Rapatea paludosa

Scientific classification
- Kingdom: Plantae
- Clade: Embryophytes
- Clade: Tracheophytes
- Clade: Angiosperms
- Clade: Monocots
- Clade: Commelinids
- Order: Poales
- Family: Rapateaceae
- Genus: Rapatea; Aubl.

Type species
- Rapatea paludosa Aubl.

Synonyms
- Mnasium Schreb.

= Rapatea =

Genus of plants

Rapatea is a genus of plants in the family Rapateaceae that was first described in 1775.

The genus is native to Panama, Trinidad, and northern South America.

Species

- Rapatea angustifolia - Venezuela (Amazonas)
- Rapatea aracamuniana - Venezuela (Cerro Aracamuni)
- Rapatea chimantensis - Venezuela (Bolivar)
- Rapatea circasiana - SE Colombia, S Venezuela, N Brazil
- Rapatea elongata - Colombia, Brazil (Mato Grosso)
- Rapatea fanshawei - Venezuela (Bolivar), Guyana
- Rapatea linearis - SE Colombia, Guyana
- Rapatea longipes - SE Colombia, S Venezuela, N Brazil
- Rapatea membranacea - Brazil, Guyana
- Rapatea muaju - Colombia, Ecuador
- Rapatea paludosa - Panama, Trinidad, Colombia, Peru, Venezuela, Brazil, Guyana, Suriname, French Guiana
- Rapatea pycnocephala - Brazil
- Rapatea rugulosa - Brazil (Amazonas)
- Rapatea saulensis - French Guiana
- Rapatea scabra - Venezuela (Amazonas)
- Rapatea spectabilis - Panama, Colombia, Ecuador, Peru
- Rapatea spruceana - SE Colombia, S Venezuela, N Brazil
- Rapatea steyermarkii - Venezuela (Bolivar), Guyana
- Rapatea ulei - Brazil (Amazonas), Guyana, French Guiana, Peru (Loreto, San Martín)
- Rapatea undulata - Brazil (Amazonas), SE Colombia
- Rapatea xiphoides - Guyana
- Rapatea yapacana - Venezuela (Amazonas)
