= UNDP South Africa =

United Nations Development Programme
- Logo of the UNDP
- Abbreviation: UNDP
- Type: Programme
- Legal status: Active
- Parent organization: ECOSOC
- Website: www.undp.orgl

The United Nations Development Programme (UNDP) in South Africa is one of the 177 offices of the UNDP’s global networks located in the country's capital, Pretoria. As a part of the wider UNDP's development efforts, the local office is responsible for supporting the government to develop and implement policies to accelerate the attainment of the Sustainable Development Goals (SDG) in South Africa. UNDP interventions in South Africa focus on promoting actions that contribute to address the triple challenge of inequality, poverty and unemployment that the county faces. In that regard, the interventions include the promotion of youth employment; building resilience to climate change impacts; biodiversity conservation; water management; promotion of access to sustainable, clean and affordable energy; and promotion of citizens participation in democratic processes. Leaving no-one behind, gender mainstreaming and innovation are in the center of all UNDP cooperation.

== History ==
The republic of South Africa formally accepted membership of the UNDP in 1994 and was admitted to the UNDP executive board in January 1998. South Africa through the Department of Foreign Affairs, coordinates the activities of the UNDP. The UNDP is involved in numerous projects in South Africa dealing with a variety of central and provincial government departments.

== Country Office Programmes ==
=== Inclusive growth ===
Some of the projects under inclusive growth include:

- Supporting SMME's to bridge the digital divide
- Automotive Training and Re-Skilling in the Post-COVID Economic Recovery for Vulnerable Youth and Women in South Africa
- Support to the Development of Value Chain for a Circular Economy in the Food Waste Sub-Sector for Sustainable Jobs and Inclusive Growth
- Youth Employment and Enterprise Development Programme, and
- Empowering Women in Agriculture Through Capacity Development

=== Service delivery and democratic governance ===
Strengthening Democratic Governance aims to assist the South African Government in repositioning the public sector to enhance the quality of service delivery through innovation, with an emphasis on providing services to historically disadvantaged communities. The outcome would be women and marginalized groups that are able to participate meaningfully in decision-making and access justice, state institutions that deliver effective public services to all, and oversight bodies that are strengthened. Some of the projects under this programme include:

- The initiative towards a New Approach for Peace and Stability in Africa
- Deepening Social Cohesion in South Africa
- Building State Capacity
- Support to the Electoral Commission of South Africa under the U Count Partnership
- Inclusive and Integrated crisis management and responses

=== Climate change & greening South Africa's economy ===
Climate Change and Greening South Africa’s Economy aims to support the South African Government to grow its ecological footprint, affirming its commitment to contribute to a cleaner and greener global environment. By 2025, the Country Office aims towards a just transition to a low-carbon society and to ensure that vulnerable and marginalized communities are more resilient to the adverse effects of climate change.

At the global level, UNDP has decades of experience supporting countries to take action on climate change. With its partners, it has helped people and communities in over 140 countries to mitigate emissions and adapt to climate impacts.

Through this programme, UNDP South Africa has been a trusted support to the government’s ongoing efforts to meet commitments under the three Rio Conventions toward combatting desertification (UNCCD), biodiversity loss (UNCBD) and climate change (UNFCCC). The programme has achieved this through strong partnerships, in particular with funding from the Global Environment Facility (GEF), which has resulted in over 25 projects with a cumulative value of over US$100 million. Impact on the ground through these projects and other UNDP global initiatives has been enabled by climate change advocacy, sound knowledge management, and capacity building for informed decision-making. UNDP’s current work on nature, climate and energy, focuses systemically on a number of areas that show UNDP’s commitment to ensuring that South Africa is on a just transition to a low-carbon society and that vulnerable and marginalized communities are more resilient to adverse effects of climate change and have access to sustainable nature-based solutions.

Some of the projects under the Nature, Climate and Energy programme include:

- Enhancing climate change mitigation and adaptation under UNDP’s Climate Promise and ensuring an inclusive approach in national climate strategies and actions through the Mission 1.5 initiative;
- The Biodiversity Finance Initiative (BIOFIN) Phase II;
- Sustainable Land Management (SLM)- Securing multiple ecosystems benefit through SLM in the productive but degraded landscapes of South Africa;
- Mainstreaming Biodiversity into Land Use Regulation and Management at the Municipal Scale;
- Strengthening Human Resources, Legal Frameworks, and Institutional Capacities to implement Nagoya Protocol (Global ABS Project);
- Development of Value Chains for Products derived from Genetic Resources in Compliance with the Nagoya Protocol on Access and Benefit Sharing and the National Biodiversity Economy Strategy;
- Improving Management Effectiveness of the Protected Area Network;
- Support to the Orange-Senqu River Commission (ORASECOM) Strategic Action Programme Implementation (A project operating in South Africa, Lesotho, Botswana and Namibia);
- South African Wind Energy Project Phase 2 (SAWEP);
- Leapfrogging South Africa's Markets to High-Efficiency LED Lighting and High-Efficiency Distribution Transformers.

=== Gender equality & HIV ===
The Country Office has put together a Gender Focal Team (GFT) to play a critical role in overseeing the development and implementation of the Country Office Gender Equality Strategy and Action Plan, as well as the Gender Seal Certification process.

=== Accelerator Labs ===
In 2020, the Country Office launched the Accelerator Lab (AccLab) as part of the global network, which was assigned the role of being the integrator of the Sustainable Development Goals (SDGs). UNDP aims to use innovation as one of its pillars to eradicate poverty, address inequality and reorient current unsuitable development trajectories. Finally, AccLabs has been engaged in several innovative projects, which are outlined in this report under the section Innovation.

=== South-South Cooperation ===
Support to South Africa’s Regional and Global Engagement aims to support South Africa’s role in the region and globally to promote South-South cooperation and raise Africa’s voice on development issues in the United Nations and other multilateral measures.

== Knowledge products ==
The country office releases several knowledge products which are split between reports that help the country office's programme implementation strategy as well as research reports that aim to assist the government in policy development and implementation.

- Annual Report
- 25 Year Review
- Socio-Economic Impact Assessment of COVID-19 in South Africa
- South Africa Economic Outlook post-COVID-19
- COVID-19 Emergency Needs assessment
- Human Development report-Youth Employment
- Governance and Social Implications of COVID-19
- South Africa SDG Investor Map 2020
- National Human Development Report
