= Potarophytum =

Scientific classification
- Kingdom: Plantae
- Clade: Tracheophytes
- Clade: Angiosperms
- Clade: Monocots
- Clade: Commelinids
- Order: Poales
- Family: Rapateaceae
- Genus: Potarophytum; Sandwith
- Species: P. riparium

Binomial name
- Potarophytum riparium Sandwith

Genus of plants

Potarophytum is a group of plants in the family Rapateaceae described as a genus in 1939.

The only known species is Potarophytum riparium, endemic to the Kaieteur National Park in the Potaro-Siparuni region of Guyana.
