= Windsorina =

Scientific classification
- Kingdom: Plantae
- Clade: Embryophytes
- Clade: Tracheophytes
- Clade: Spermatophytes
- Clade: Angiosperms
- Clade: Monocots
- Clade: Commelinids
- Order: Poales
- Family: Rapateaceae
- Genus: Windsorina; Gleason
- Species: W. guianensis

Binomial name
- Windsorina guianensis Gleason

Genus of flowering plants

Windsorina is a group of plants in the family Rapateaceae described as a genus in 1923.

The only known species is Windsorina guianensis, endemic to the Kaieteur National Park along the Potaro River in Guyana.

The genus is named in honour of the House of Windsor, Royal Family of the United Kingdom.
