= Duckea =

Scientific classification
- Kingdom: Plantae
- Clade: Embryophytes
- Clade: Tracheophytes
- Clade: Spermatophytes
- Clade: Angiosperms
- Clade: Monocots
- Clade: Commelinids
- Order: Poales
- Family: Rapateaceae
- Genus: Duckea; Maguire

Type species
- Duckea cyperaceoidea (Ducke) Maguire

Genus of flowering plants

Duckea is a group of plants in the family Rapateaceae described as a genus in 1958.

The genus is native to South America.

Species

- Duckea cyperaceoidea (Ducke) Maguire - SE Colombia, S Venezuela (Amazonas), N Brazil (Pará, Amazonas)
- Duckea flava (Link) Maguire - SE Colombia, S Venezuela (Amazonas), N Brazil (Amazonas)
- Duckea junciformis Maguire - SE Colombia (Vaupés), S Venezuela (Amazonas)
- Duckea squarrosa (Willd. ex Link) Maguire - S Venezuela (Amazonas, Bolívar), N Brazil (Amazonas)
