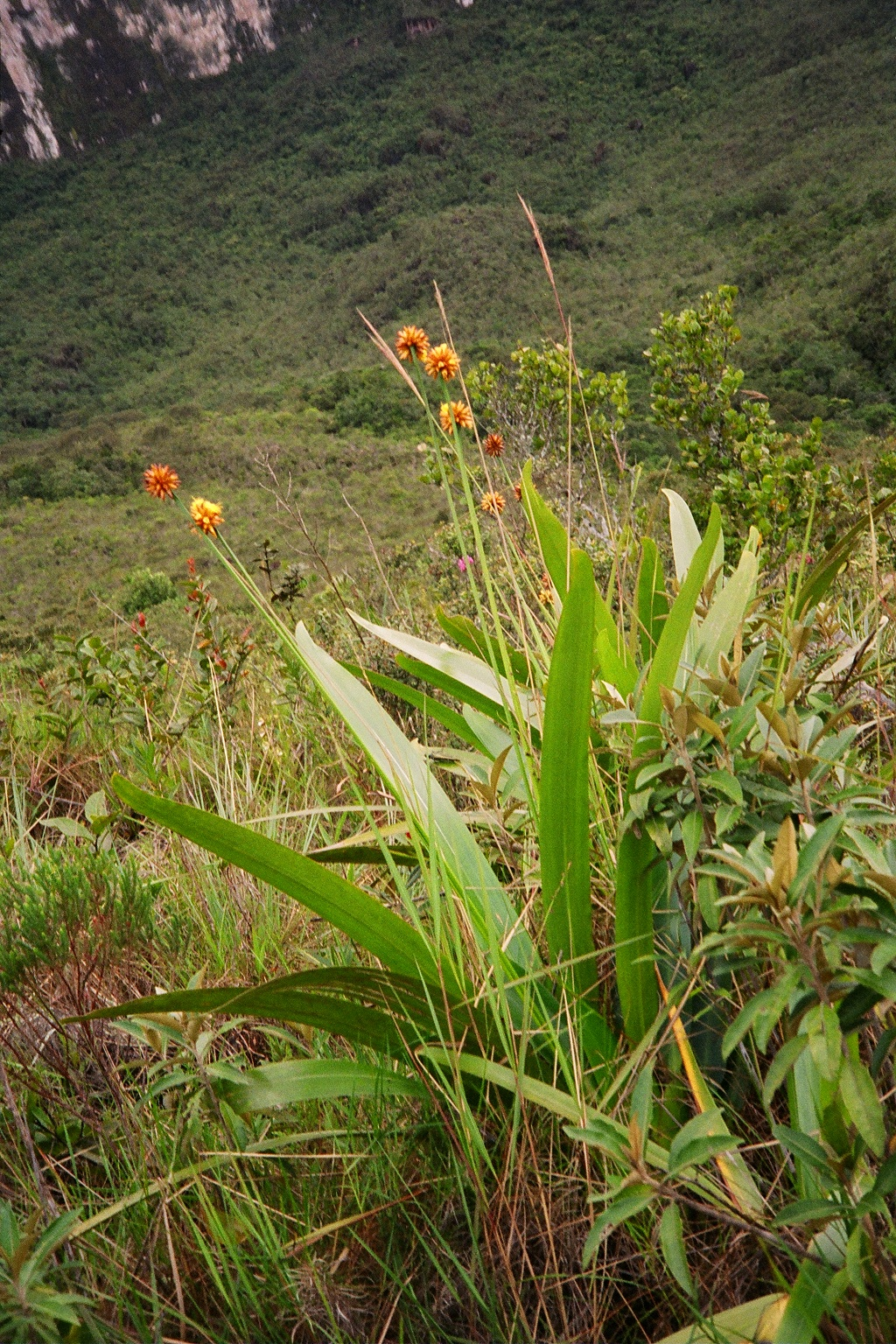
- Stegolepis guianensis

Scientific classification
- Kingdom: Plantae
- Clade: Tracheophytes
- Clade: Angiosperms
- Clade: Monocots
- Clade: Commelinids
- Order: Poales
- Family: Rapateaceae
- Genus: Stegolepis; Klotzsch ex Körn.

Type species
- Stegolepis guianensis Klotzsch ex Körn.

= Stegolepis =

Genus of plants

Stegolepis is a group of plants in the family Rapateaceae described as a genus in 1872 .

The genus is endemic to northeastern South America, primarily southern Venezuela.

Species

- Stegolepis albiflora - Venezuela (Bolívar, Amazonas)
- Stegolepis angustata - Bolívar, Guyana
- Stegolepis breweri - Bolívar
- Stegolepis cardonae - Bolívar
- Stegolepis celiae - Venezuela (Bolívar, Amazonas), N Brazil
- Stegolepis choripetala - Venezuela (Bolívar, Amazonas)
- Stegolepis ferruginea - Guyana
- Stegolepis gleasoniana - Cerro Duida
- Stegolepis grandis - Venezuela (Bolívar, Amazonas)
- Stegolepis guianensis - Mount Roraima
- Stegolepis hitchcockii - Venezuela (Amazonas)
- Stegolepis huberi - Mount Roraima
- Stegolepis humilis - Bolívar
- Stegolepis jauaensis - Bolívar
- Stegolepis ligulata - Bolívar
- Stegolepis linearis - Venezuela (Amazonas)
- Stegolepis maguireana - Bolívar
- Stegolepis membranacea - Venezuela (Amazonas)
- Stegolepis microcephala - Cerro Jaua
- Stegolepis minor - Sierra de Lema
- Stegolepis neblinensis - Sierra de la Neblina
- Stegolepis parvipetala - Bolívar
- Stegolepis pauciflora - Cerro Duida
- Stegolepis perligulata - Bolívar
- Stegolepis piresii - Brazil (Amazonas)
- Stegolepis ptaritepuiensis - Bolívar, Guyana
- Stegolepis pulchella - Venezuela (Amazonas)
- Stegolepis pungens - Cerro Duida
- Stegolepis squarrosa - Bolívar
- Stegolepis steyermarkii - Bolívar, Guyana
- Stegolepis terramarensis - Cerro Marahuaka
- Stegolepis vivipara - Bolívar
- Stegolepis wurdackii - Venezuela (Bolívar, Amazonas)
