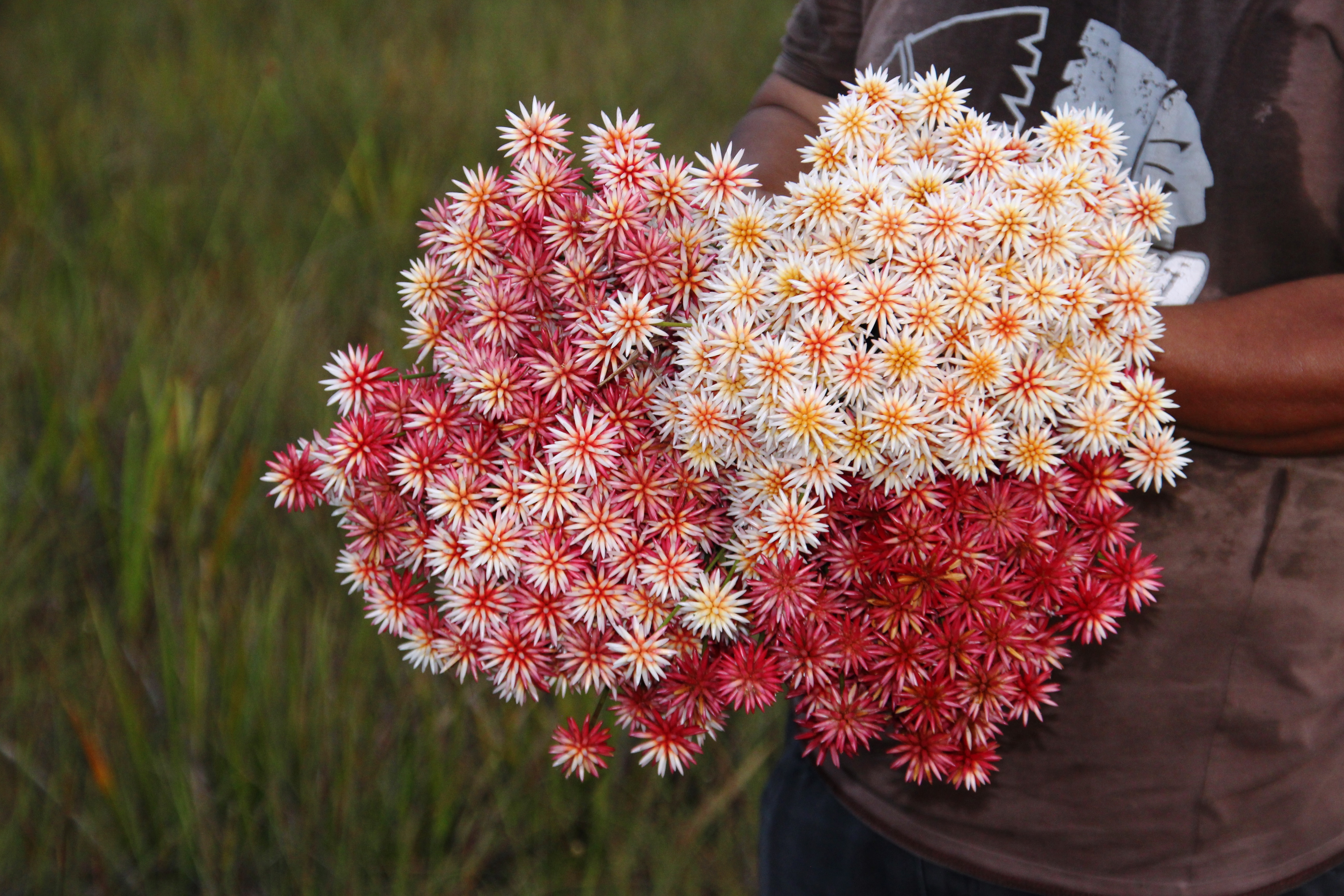
- Schoenocephalium teretifolium

Scientific classification
- Kingdom: Plantae
- Clade: Tracheophytes
- Clade: Angiosperms
- Clade: Monocots
- Clade: Commelinids
- Order: Poales
- Family: Rapateaceae
- Genus: Schoenocephalium; Seub.

Type species
- Schoenocephalium martianum Seub.

= Schoenocephalium =

Genus of plants

Schoenocephalium is a group of plants in the family Rapateaceae described as a genus in 1845.

The genus is native to South America.

Species

- Schoenocephalium cucullatum Maguire - S Venezuela, SE Colombia, NW Brazil
- Schoenocephalium martianum Seub. - Colombia (Amazonas)
- Schoenocephalium schultesii Maguire - Colombia (Vaupés)
- Schoenocephalium teretifolium Maguire - SE Colombia to Venezuela (Amazonas)
