= Epidryos =

Scientific classification
- Kingdom: Plantae
- Clade: Tracheophytes
- Clade: Angiosperms
- Clade: Monocots
- Clade: Commelinids
- Order: Poales
- Family: Rapateaceae
- Genus: Epidryos; Maguire

Type species
- Epidryos allenii (Steyerm.) Maguire

Synonyms
- Epiphyton Maguire 1958, illegitimate homonym not Bornem. 1886

Genus of flowering plants

Epidryos is a group of plants in the family Rapateaceae described as a genus with this name in 1962.

The genus is native to South America and to Panama.

Species

- Epidryos allenii (Steyerm.) Maguire - Panama
- Epidryos guayanensis Maguire - Bolívar, Pakaraima
- Epidryos micrantherus (Maguire) Maguire - Colombia, N Ecuador
