= Lake Leopoldo =

- Lake Leopold
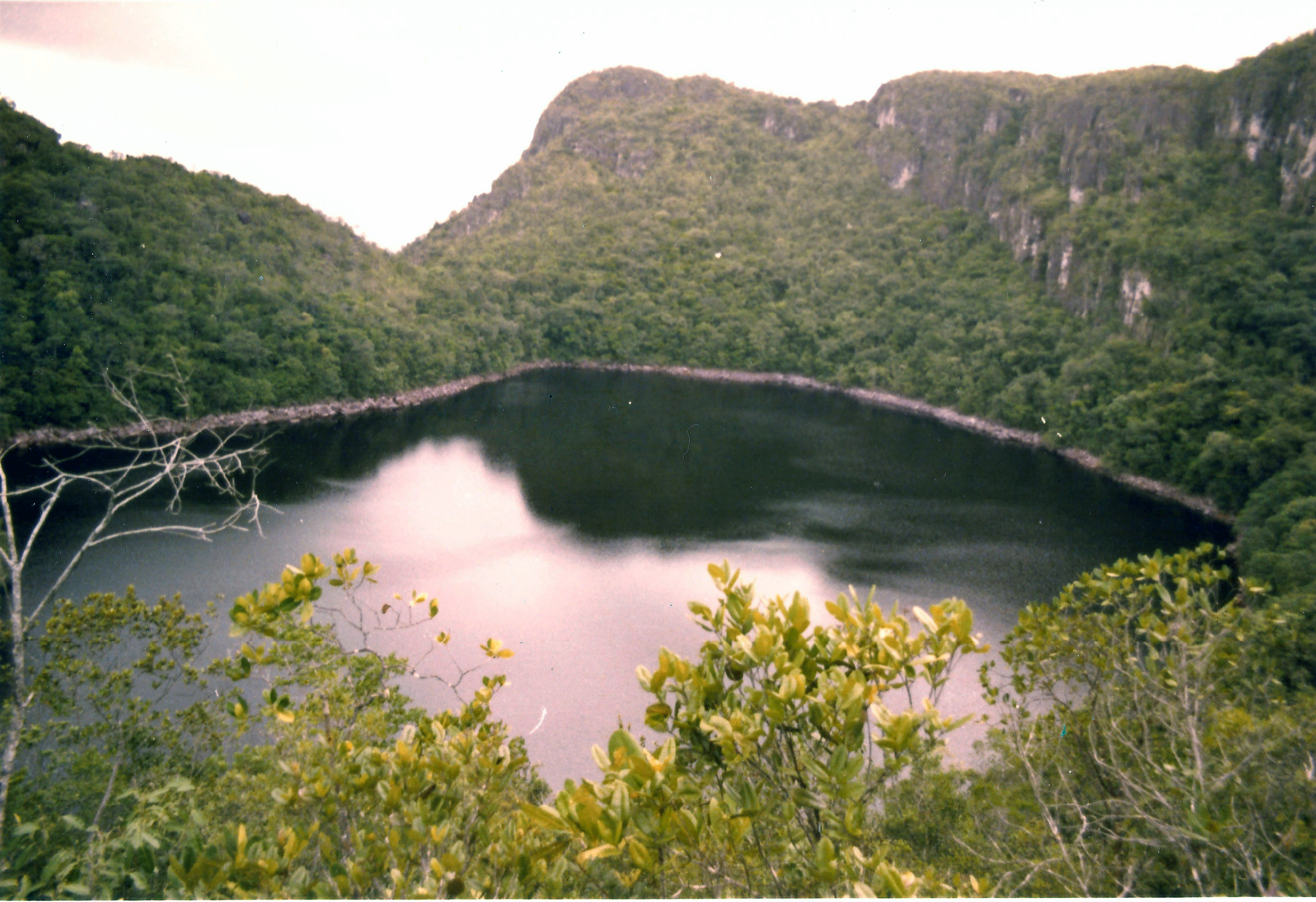
- Lago Leopoldo / Autana. Photo taken in April 1973. The level of the water has decreased substantially in recent years such that the edges now consist of sandy beaches.

- Location within Venezuela
- Location: Venezuela
- Coordinates: 4°57′57″N 67°29′08″W
- Type: lake
- Max. length: 320 metres (1,050 ft)
- Max. width: 240 metres (790 ft)
- Max. depth: 20 metres (66 ft)
- Surface elevation: 384 metres (1,260 ft)

Lago Leopoldo (Lake Leopold) is a body of water located in the Venezuelan Amazon in the westernmost range of the Guiana Shield. It measures about 320 metres (1,050 ft) by and 240 metres (790 ft) and up to 20 metres (66 ft) deep. The water level was documented at 384 metres (1,260 ft) above sea level but may have diminished in recent years. Its name derives from the expedition that King Leopold III of Belgium made in 1952 which motored up the Sipapo, Autana and Umaj-Ajé rivers and set camp several miles from the lake. There is no firm evidence that members of King Leopold expedition actually reached the lake. Lago Leopoldo was first seen from the air as a landmark near the Cerro Autana tepui during the 1950s. The lake was first visited by helicopter in March 1973 by the Spanish naturalist Félix Rodríguez de la Fuente. The following April, the terrestrial route from the original King Leopold III camp was established by a Venezuelan expedition which reached the shores of the lake on April 18, 1973. Lago Leopoldo figures prominently in the oral history and lore of the native Piaroans where it is referred as "Paraka-Wachoe" or the lake in the mountains. Lago Leopoldo now renamed Lago Autana has been included as a natural monument within a protected area which includes the Cerro Autana and adjacent lands.

== Description ==
Lago Leopoldo is located in the westernmost section of the Cuao-Sipapo Massif which constitutes the western edge of the Guiana Shield, east of the Sipapo and Orinoco Rivers. It lies between the hydrological basins of the rivers Cuao to the north and Autana to the south. The lake is sited in a mountain top with a prominent scarped side in the north-west edge and a smaller basin edge in the south-east border. Its water collects from rain accumulation; drainage is by a subterranean stream which emerges at a distance from the lake's edge in the south. This stream drains into an affluent of the Umaj-Ajé River which drains into the Autana. The edge consists of nutrient-poor sandy soils originating from the erosion of the surrounding sandstone. Its eroded cliffs contain vegetation typical of transition areas with low shrubs in the upper part and shrubs, palms and large herbs downslope. The base of the cliffs consists of an accumulation of quartzite blocks covered by mosses and algae. Farther from the edge there are stunted trees with trunks and branches covered by mosses, lichens and epiphytes such as ferns, orchids and bromeliads. The shores are light to dark rose or white in color, with sandy soils, rich in quartz, extremely nutrient poor and with low water retention capacity. The site is remote and virtually inaccessible. It does not appear in maps of colonial settlers or of European explorers of the 19th century.

== Geology ==
Lake Leopoldo is located in the strata of the Roraima Group rocks preserved in erosional remnants that rest on eroded Parguaza Granite. Roraima sandstones in the Cuao table-mountains consist of a basal member characterized by graded sandstones with cross-bedding and ripples, wackes and thin discontinuous conglomerates; a middle member consisting of two strata of black and gray shales inter-bedded with quartzitic sandstones; and an upper member consisting of quartzitic sandstone with traces of carbonate, feldspathic sandstones and sandstones with abundant hematite. The lake is likely the result of the collapse of sandstones in a process similar to the formation of the caves of Cerro Autana. The bottom of the lake is composed mostly of sand and small quantities of mud. Sand composition is largely quartz arenite and a small percentage of monomineralic components dominated by quartz and some accessory minerals (zircon, feldspar, hematite, and rutile). Of note is the high concentration of mercury in the sediment which is 2.3 higher than the expected concentration on these remote areas. In the absence of human activity around the lake and the fact that the closest gold mining operation is 250 km (155 miles) to the NE, possible sources of the high concentration of mercury include regional geologic sources through biochemical transformation of the soils, atmospheric transport from remote human sources, and burning of biomasses from the clearing of surrounding forests.

== Biology ==
Lake Leopoldo is a unique aquatic environment characterized by an oligotrophic system where nutrient inputs are controlled through atmospheric deposition. Sediments are probably derived from the highly weathered small drainage basin and are rich in higher plant derived organic matter. The organic matter in the sediments is consistent with plant origin. The concentration of oxygen is low in line with the oligotrophic environment. The pH indicates an acidic environment ranging from 5.05 to 4.55 from the surface to the bottom. These values are similar to those reported in rainfall in other parts of the Guayana Shield in Venezuela and the Amazon

== Geography and exploration ==
Lake Leopoldo was first documented from the air by Captain Harry Gibson, an aviator in Venezuela who made numerous flights over the Guiana Shield and the Venezuelan Amazon in the early 1950s. A short film at low altitude over the lake taken around 1971 shows what appears to be a violent tide on the surface. This briefly gave rise to the proposition that the lake harbored a large creature. The name came from the Expedition that King Leopold III of the Belgians made in 1952 to the Upper Orinoco which went up the Umaj-Ajé River and stopped in an area of rapids from where the river is no longer navigable. A photograph taken on June 6, 1952, shows the dugout canoes stopped in the rapid which became known as Elata following the acronym of the expedition (Expedicion Leopoldo al Territorio Amazonas). In 1973 there was verbal account that the anthropologist José Cruxent (Josep Maria Cruxent, 1911–2005) who was in Leopold's expedition had reached the lake by foot but this was never corroborated nor was there any photographic or physical documentation of this visit. In March 1973, the Spanish naturalist Félix Rodríguez de la Fuente reached the surface of the lake by helicopter and obtained film footage. The first expedition that established the terrestrial route to Lake Leopoldo started in the Rio Sipapo and travelled up the Sipapo, Autana and Umaj-Aje rivers. A camp was established in the same site of King Leopold's camp 20 years earlier. From there, the expedition continued first with a direct route to the expected location of the lake and then following the right margin of the Umaj-Ajé River towards the junction of the brooks Caño del Zorro and Caño El Cejal. Location was set by triangulation using high altitude photographs supplied by the aerial cartography company Tranarg. In spite of the accuracy of the photographs, the final location of the lake was made by dead reckoning with systematic exploration of all possible sites within the general area. The shores of the lake were reached in the afternoon of April 18, 1973 by an advance group which included Rodolfo Ricardo and Henry Hopkins. The rest of the expedition consisting of Nedo Paniz, Luis D. Berrizbeitia, Fernando Hué, Pedro Gómez, Carlos Rodríguez, Néstor Rodríguez Lamelas, Marcial Pacheco and two members of the Venezuelan National Guard reached the lake the following day April 19, 1973. There was extensive photographic and film documentation and an account of the expedition appeared in the Sunday supplement ‘Séptimo Dia’ of the Caracas newspaper El Nacional. After the first expedition the lake was reached several times by members of the original expedition (Nedo Paniz, three times 1975–1987; Luis D. Berrizbeitia, three times 1990–1996) and possibly others. The land route to Lake Leopoldo has been established using a base camp at the Elata rapid and a second camp at the base of the mountain that harbors the lake. There are no Piaroan dwellings in the area and the Indians seldom visit the area for which there are no trails other than animal paths that follow the edge of the rivers.

== Mythology ==
Lake Leopoldo lies in the same area of Cerro Autana which has a distinct role in the ancestral and creation myths of the Piaroa Indians. Nonetheless, specific references to Lake Leopoldo in Piaroan mythology are rare. The lake is known to them as "Paraka-Wachoe" or the lake in the mountain. During the first 1973 expedition Piaroan helpers refused to make the trek to the lake indicating that those were the "lands of the devil." In 1996 during a conversation with the headman of the village of Mapoy, he stated that the lake was sacred for the Piaroans and that foreigners should not go underneath its surface. (Note: This information was collected in August of 1996 by Luis D. Berrizbeitia.)
