= Saxo-fridericia =

Scientific classification
- Kingdom: Plantae
- Clade: Tracheophytes
- Clade: Angiosperms
- Clade: Monocots
- Clade: Commelinids
- Order: Poales
- Family: Rapateaceae
- Genus: Saxo-fridericia; R.H.Schomb.

Type species
- Saxo-fridericia regalis R.H.Schomb.

Synonyms
- Saxofridericia R.H.Schomb., spelling variant

Genus of plants

Saxo-fridericia is a group of plants in the family Rapateaceae described as a genus in 1845.

The genus is native to northern South America.

Species

- Saxo-fridericia aculeata Körn - N Brazil (Amapá, Amazonas), SE Colombia, Guyana, French Guiana, Suriname
- Saxo-fridericia compressa Maguire - Venezuela (Amazonas), Brazil (Amazonas)
- Saxo-fridericia duidae Maguire - Venezuela (Amazonas)
- Saxo-fridericia grandis Maguire - Venezuela (Amazonas)
- Saxo-fridericia inermis Ducke - Brazil (Amazonas), Venezuela (Amazonas), Colombia (Guainía)
- Saxo-fridericia petiolata Maguire - Venezuela (Amazonas)
- Saxo-fridericia regalis R.H.Schomb. - Roraima, Venezuela (Bolívar, Amazonas), Guyana
- Saxo-fridericia spongiosa Maguire - Venezuela (Amazonas), Brazil (Amazonas)
