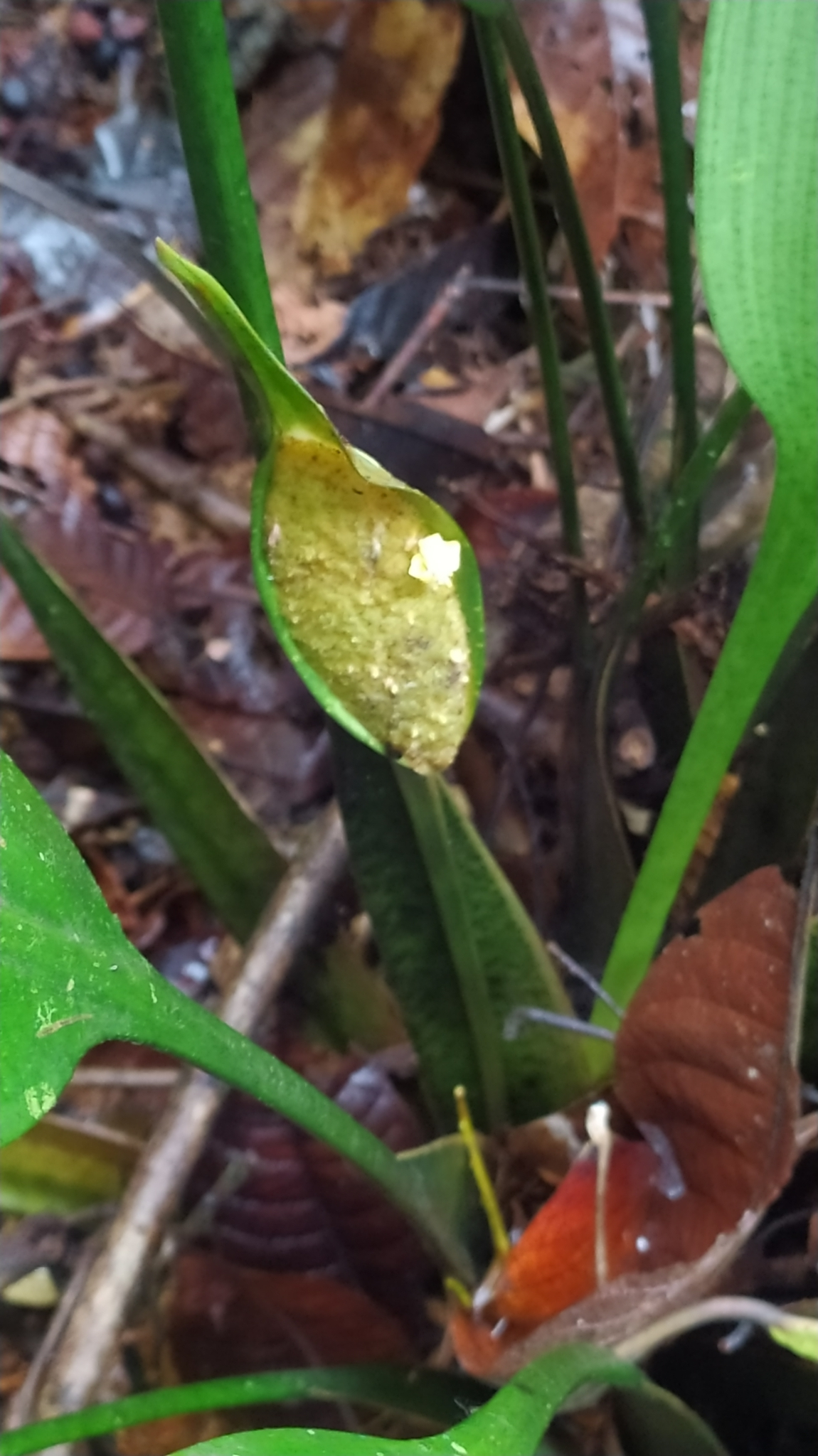
- S. unilateralis

Scientific classification
- Kingdom: Plantae
- Clade: Tracheophytes
- Clade: Angiosperms
- Clade: Monocots
- Clade: Commelinids
- Order: Poales
- Family: Rapateaceae
- Genus: Spathanthus; Desv.

Type species
- Spathanthus unilateralis (Rudge)Desv.

= Spathanthus =

Genus of plants

Spathanthus is a group of plants in the family Rapateaceae described as a genus in 1828.

The genus is native to South America.

Species

- Spathanthus bicolor Ducke - SE Colombia (Amazonas), S Venezuela (Amazonas), N Brazil (Amazonas)
- Spathanthus unilateralis (Rudge) Desv. N Brazil (Pará, Amapá, Amazonas), S Venezuela (Amazonas), Guyana, Suriname, French Guiana
