= Phelpsiella =

Scientific classification
- Kingdom: Plantae
- Clade: Tracheophytes
- Clade: Angiosperms
- Clade: Monocots
- Clade: Commelinids
- Order: Poales
- Family: Rapateaceae
- Genus: Phelpsiella; Maguire
- Species: P. ptericaulis

Binomial name
- Phelpsiella ptericaulis Maguire

Genus of flowering plants

Phelpsiella is a group of plants in the family Rapateaceae described as a genus in 1958.

The only known species is Phelpsiella ptericaulis, endemic to the Cerro Parú of Amazonas State in southern Venezuela.
