= Marahuacaea =

Scientific classification
- Kingdom: Plantae
- Clade: Tracheophytes
- Clade: Angiosperms
- Clade: Monocots
- Clade: Commelinids
- Order: Poales
- Family: Rapateaceae
- Genus: Marahuacaea; Maguire
- Species: M. schomburgkii

Binomial name
- Marahuacaea schomburgkii (Maguire) Maguire

Synonyms
- Amphiphyllum schomburgkii Maguire

Genus of flowering plants

Marahuacaea is a group of plants in the family Rapateaceae described as a genus in 1984.

The only known species is Marahuacaea schomburgkii, native to the Cerro Marahuaca in the State of Amazonas in Venezuela).
