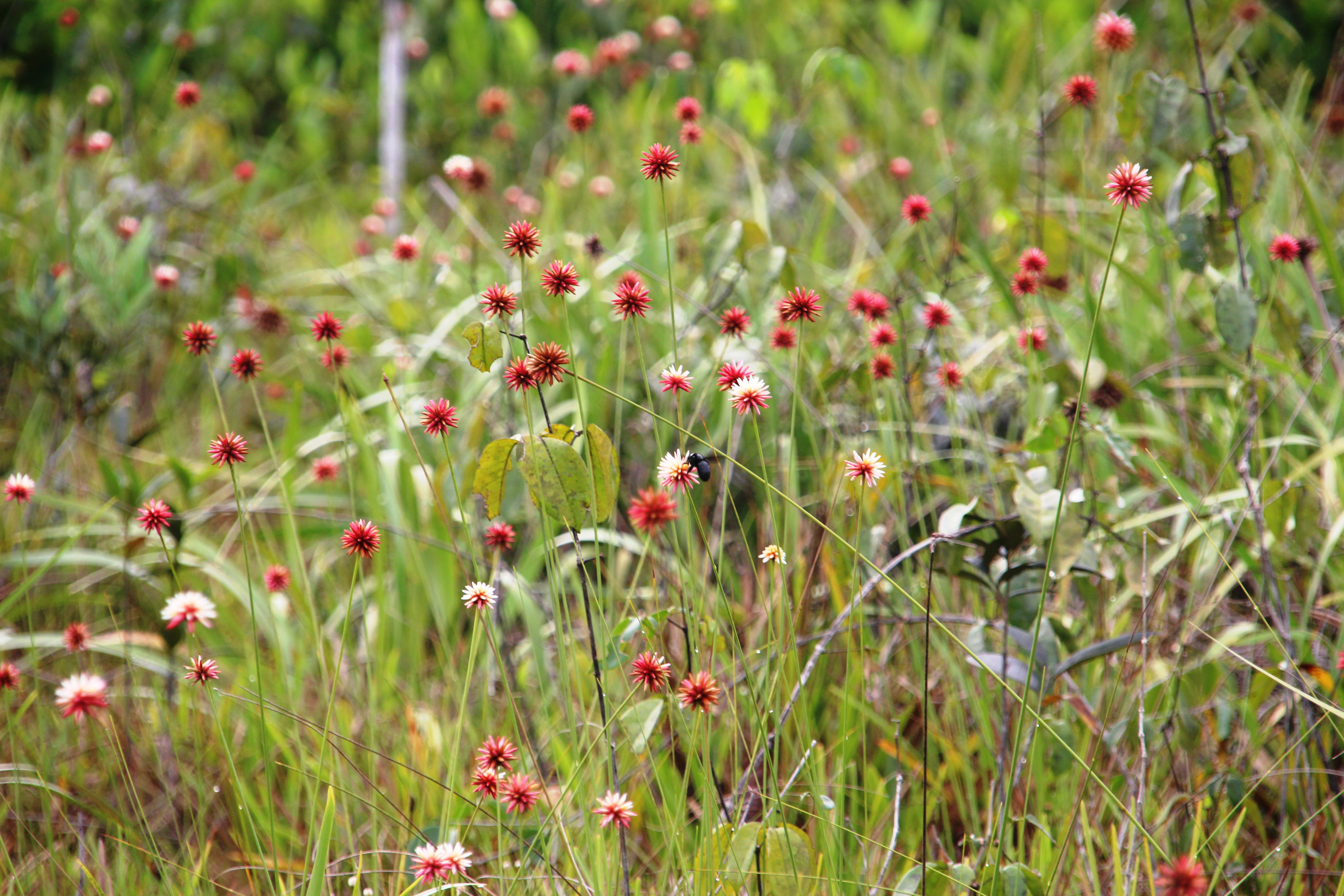

Scientific classification
- Kingdom: Plantae
- Clade: Tracheophytes
- Clade: Angiosperms
- Clade: Monocots
- Clade: Commelinids
- Order: Poales
- Family: Rapateaceae
- Genus: Schoenocephalium
- Species: S. teretifolium

Binomial name
- Schoenocephalium teretifolium Maguire

= Schoenocephalium teretifolium =

Species of flowering plant

Schoenocephalium teretifolium or Summertime Inírida flower (from the Spanish: Flor de Inírida de verano) is a monocot which is an endemic plant in the area between the Colombian rivers of Guainia and Inírida. Guacamaya superba, another plant in the Rapateaceae family, is also endemic to this region.
