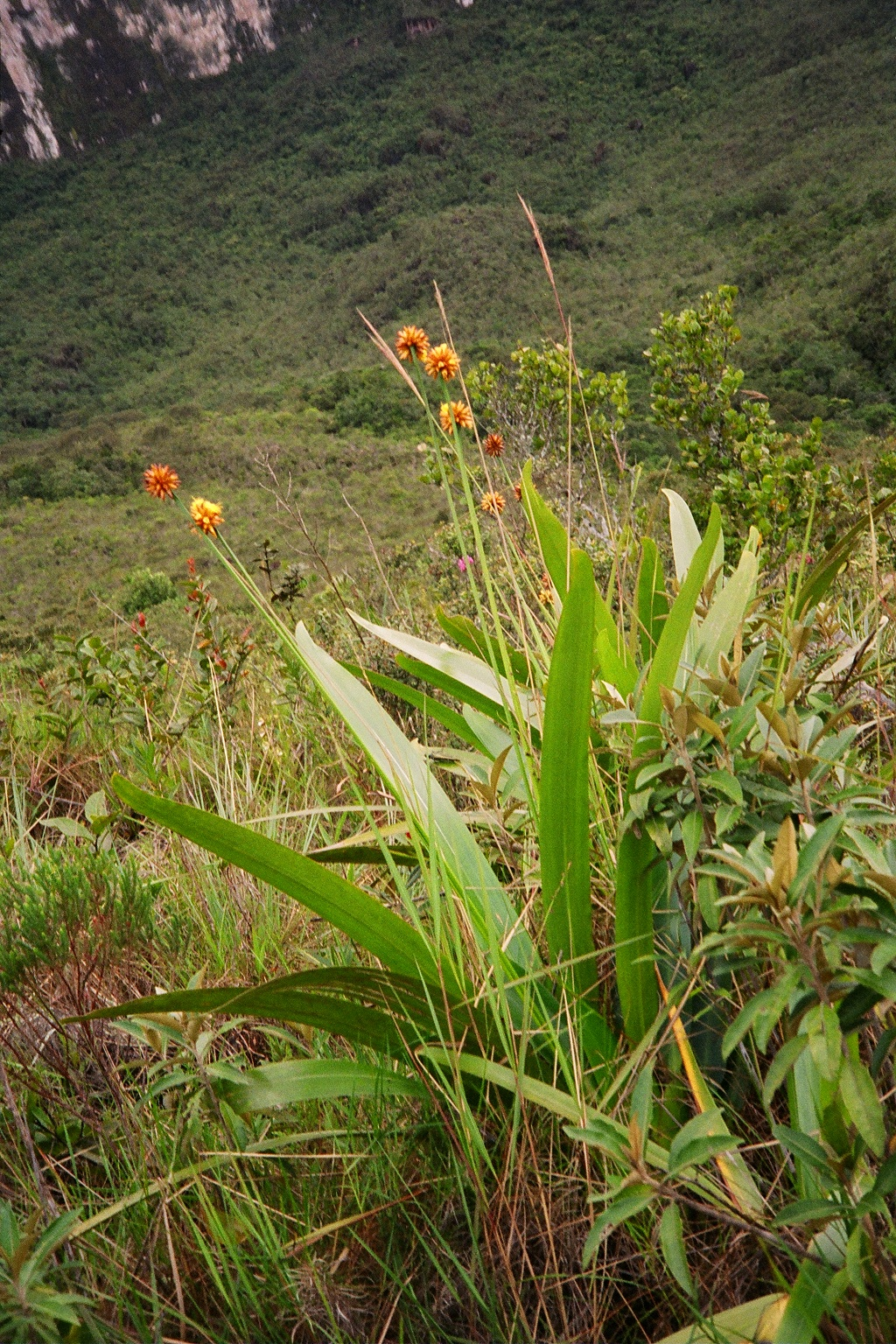
- Stegolepis guianensis

Scientific classification
- Kingdom: Plantae
- Clade: Tracheophytes
- Clade: Angiosperms
- Clade: Monocots
- Clade: Commelinids
- Order: Poales
- Family: Rapateaceae; Dumort.
- Global species richness of Rapateaceae

= Rapateaceae =

Family of flowering plants

The Rapateaceae are a family of flowering plants. The botanical name has been recognized by most taxonomists.

The APG II system of 2003 also recognizes this family, and assigns it to the order Poales in the clade commelinids, in the monocots. This represents a slight change from the APG system, 1998, which left the family unplaced as to order, but placed it in the same clade (although it used the spelling "commelinoids"). The family is divided into 16 genera with a total of about 94 known species, found in tropical South America and tropical west Africa.

The Cronquist system of 1981 also recognized this family and placed it in the order Commelinales in the subclass Commelinidae in class Liliopsida in division Magnoliophyta.

== Genera ==
- Amphiphyllum Gleason
- Cephalostemon R.H.Schomb.
- Duckea Maguire
- Epidryos Maguire
- Guacamaya Maguire
- Kunhardtia Maguire
- Marahuacaea Maguire
- Maschalocephalus Gilg & K.Schum.
- Monotrema Korn.
- Phelpsiella Maguire
- Potarophytum Sandwith
- Rapatea Aubl.
- Saxo-fridericia R.H. Schomb.
- Schoenocephalium Seub.
- Spathanthus Desv.
- Stegolepis Klotzsch ex Korn.
- Windsorina Gleason
