= Monotrema (plant) =

Scientific classification
- Kingdom: Plantae
- Clade: Tracheophytes
- Clade: Angiosperms
- Clade: Monocots
- Clade: Commelinids
- Order: Poales
- Family: Rapateaceae
- Genus: Monotrema; Körn.

Type species
- Monotrema aemulans Körn.

Genus of flowering plants

Monotrema is a group of plants in the family Rapateaceae described as a genus in 1872.

The genus is native to northern South America.

species

- Monotrema aemulans Körn - Venezuela (Amazonas), Guyana, Brazil (Amazonas, Mato Grosso)
- Monotrema × affine Maguire - Venezuela (Amazonas)
- Monotrema arthrophyllum (Seub.) Maguire - Colombia (Vaupés, Caquetá)
- Monotrema bracteatum Maguire - Colombia (Guainía), Venezuela (Amazonas, Bolívar)
- Monotrema xyridoides Gleason - Venezuela (Amazonas), Colombia (Caquetá), Brazil (Amazonas, Roraima)
