= 2022 United Nations Biodiversity Conference =

COP 15 (Biodiversity)

United Nations Biodiversity Conference COP15
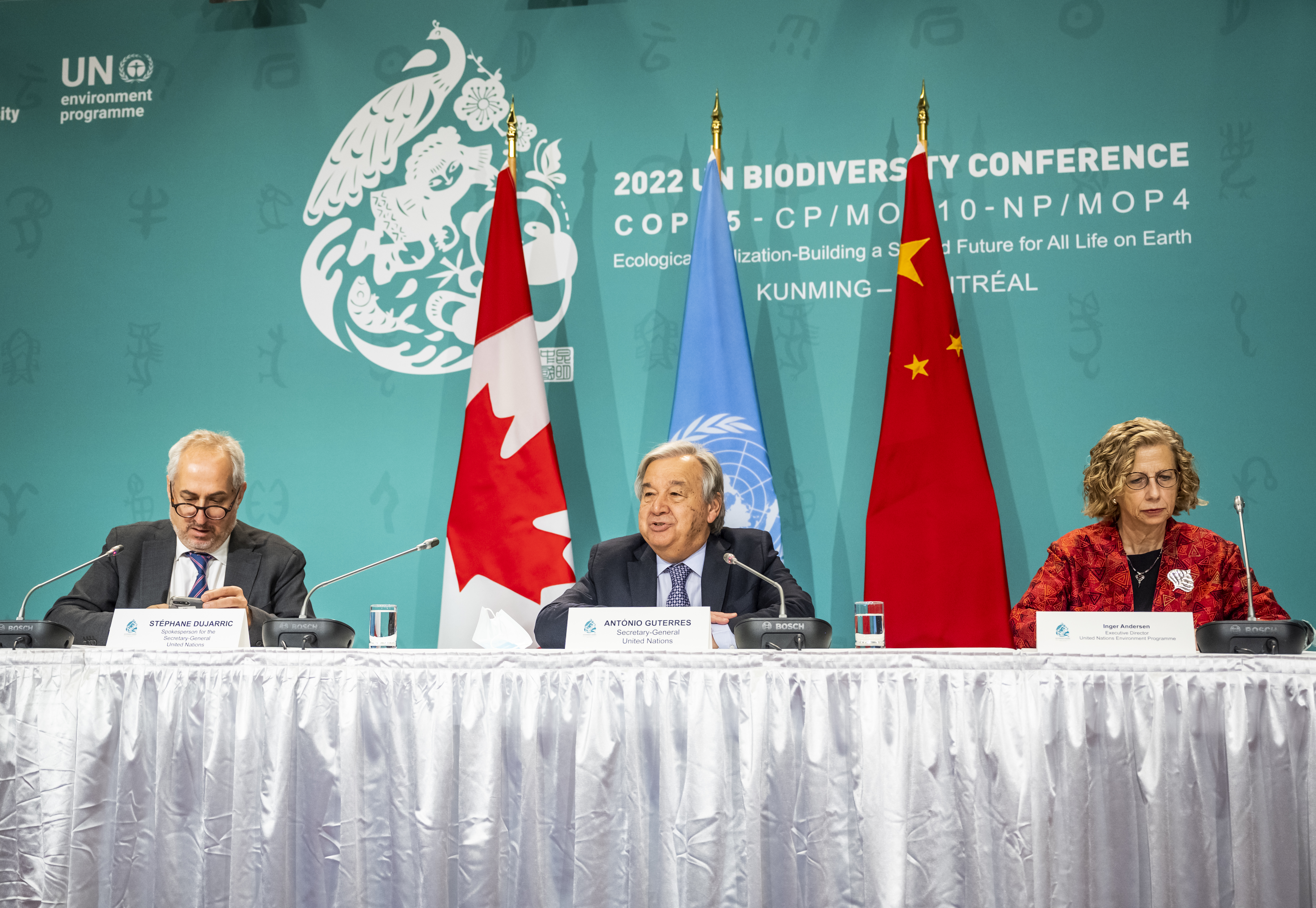
- Date: 7–19 December 2022.
- Cities: Montreal, Quebec, Canada
- Venues: Palais des congrès de Montréal
- Participants: Convention on Biological Diversity member countries
- Follows: ← Egypt 2018
- Precedes: → Colombia 2024
- Website: https://www.cbd.int/meetings/COP-15

The 2022 United Nations Biodiversity Conference of the Parties (COP15) to the UN Convention on Biological Diversity (CBD) was a conference held in Montreal, Canada, which led to the international agreement to protect 30% of land and oceans by 2030 (30 by 30) and the adoption of the Kunming-Montreal Global Biodiversity Framework.

== History ==
The conference was originally scheduled to be held in October 2020, but was delayed due to the COVID-19 pandemic. It was rescheduled to be held in April 2022 in Kunming, China, but was postponed again, for a fourth time due to China's zero-COVID policy, to the third quarter of 2022 according to the UN secretariat office on March 29. In May 2022, China requested Canada to assume the host responsibility. The Canadian Minister of Environment and Climate Change Steven Guilbeault met with representatives from the High Ambition Coalition in early June 2022 and these representatives asked Canada to host COP15. The Prime Minister of Canada Justin Trudeau approved the proposal. In June 2022, the UN secretariat for the Convention on Biological Diversity and China's environment ministry said in separate statements that the meeting would be held in December 2022 in Montreal, Canada, where the secretariat is based, though China would remain the president of the summit. This arrangement is consistent with previous practices of moving the meeting to a different country, such as the 2017 United Nations Climate Change Conference (Fiji held the presidency while Germany organized the meeting for practical purpose) and the 2019 United Nations Climate Change Conference (Chile maintained the presidency despite the meeting being moved to Spain due to political instability in Chile). While the host countries of previous COPs had one to two years to organize the conference, Canada had just five months to prepare for the arrival of 18,000 delegates from 196 CBD member states, non-governmental organizations, industry groups and academia.

This is the second time Montreal served as the host city for a UN Conference of Parties meeting, the first time being the COP11 climate change conference in 2005. Montreal also played host to the negotiations for the Montreal Protocol.

== Development ==
=== Lead-up ===
Several cities signed the "Montreal Pledge" in advance of the conference to commit to protect biodiversity in their cities through 15 actions.

=== Negotiations and adoption ===
During the talks, divisions remained on numerous issues as the conference went into its final days, such as disputes over the funding for conservation efforts. There was also discussion that protections for marine biodiversity could be dropped completely. An op-ed published in The Guardian in mid-December criticized the proceedings as being very slow and lacking urgency.

On December 19, almost every country on earth signed onto the agreement which includes protecting 30% of land and oceans by 2030 (30 by 30) and 22 other targets intended to reduce biodiversity loss. When the agreement was signed only 17% of land territory and 10% of ocean territory were protected. The agreement includes protecting the rights of indigenous peoples and changing the current subsidy policy to a one better for biodiversity protection. However, it makes a step backward in protecting species from extinction in comparison to the Aichi Targets. Some countries said the agreement does not go far enough to protect biodiversity, and that the process was rushed. Only the United States and the Holy See did not join it. The absence of the United States signature weakened the agreement. However, the country helped to reach the agreement, strongly advanced some of the targets mentioned in it, especially 30 by 30, nationally and internationally and is a major donor to biodiversity protection issues.

== Content ==
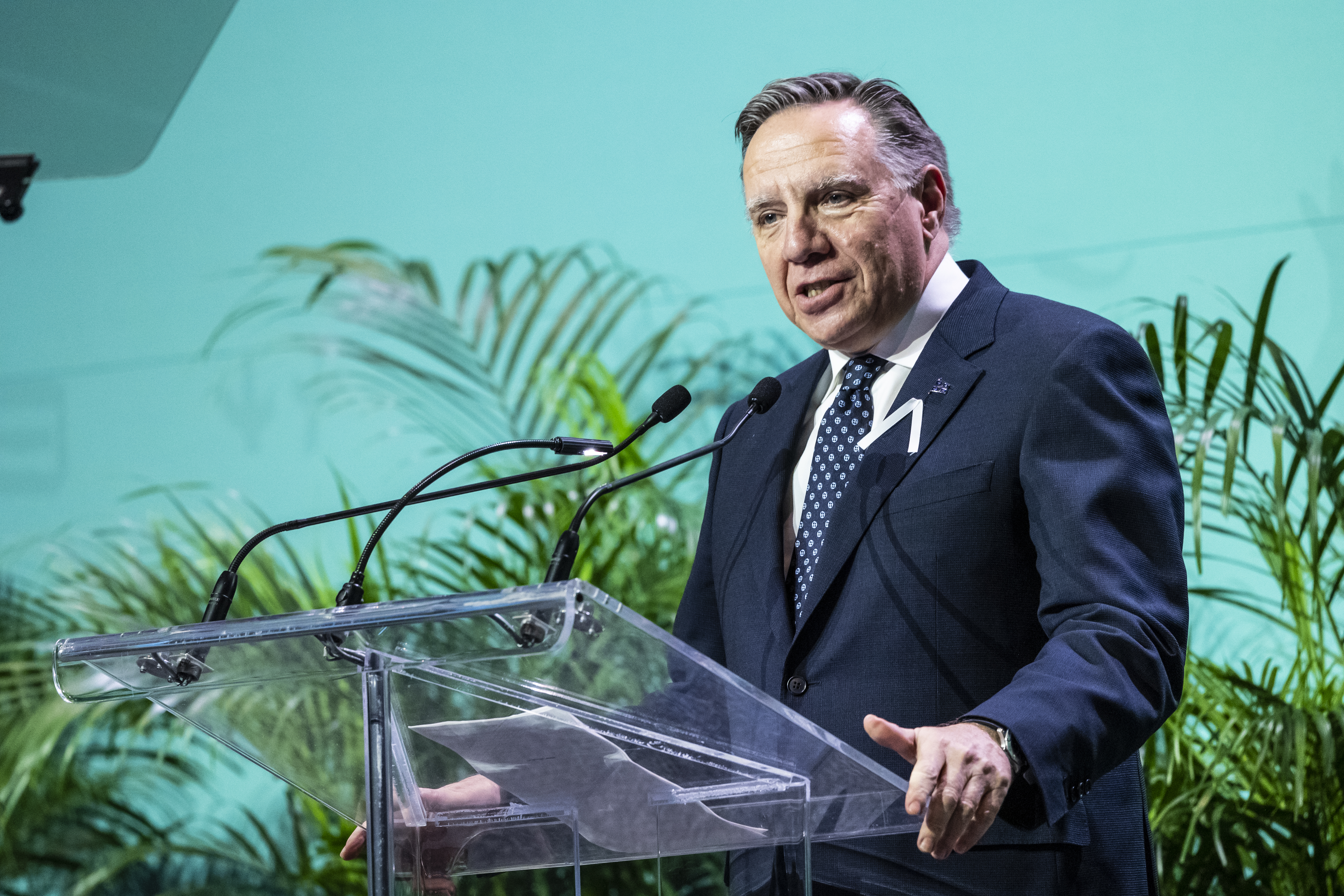
François Legault, premier of Quebec, during the opening ceremony of the COP15

In addition to protecting 30% of land and oceans by 2030, the agreement includes also recovering 30% of earth degraded ecosystems and increasing funding for biodiversity issues. Other targets for the year 2030 include cutting overconsumption and waste, reducing food waste by 50%, and completely stop harming ecosystems that are strongly important for biodiversity. There are also 4 targets for the year 2050 which includes increasing the area of natural ecosystems, restoring their integrity and normal functioning, reducing tenfold the human caused extinction rate, and protecting traditional knowledge.

COP15 adopted a comprehensive package of 6 items:

- L25: Kunming-Montreal Global Biodiversity Framework (GBF)
- L26: Monitoring framework for the Kunming-Montreal Global Biodiversity Framework
- L27: Mechanisms for planning, monitoring, reporting and review
- L28: Capacity-building and development and technical and scientific cooperation
- L29: Resource mobilization
- L30: Digital sequence information on genetic resources.

The advocacy of the UNCBD Women's Cacus and its members led to a Rio Convention for the first time in its 30-year history to adopt a stand-alone target, Target 23, on gender equality in the Kunming-Montreal Global Biodiversity Framework.

== See also ==
- Global Assessment Report on Biodiversity and Ecosystem Services
- 2024 United Nations Biodiversity Conference
