= Kunhardtia =

Scientific classification
- Kingdom: Plantae
- Clade: Tracheophytes
- Clade: Angiosperms
- Clade: Monocots
- Clade: Commelinids
- Order: Poales
- Family: Rapateaceae
- Genus: Kunhardtia; Maguire

Type species
- Kunhardtia rhodantha Maguire

Genus of flowering plants

Kunhardtia is a group of plants in the family Rapateaceae described as a genus in 1958.

The genus is endemic to the State of Amazonas in southern Venezuela.

Species

- Kunhardtia radiata Maguire & Steyerm.
- Kunhardtia rhodantha Maguire
