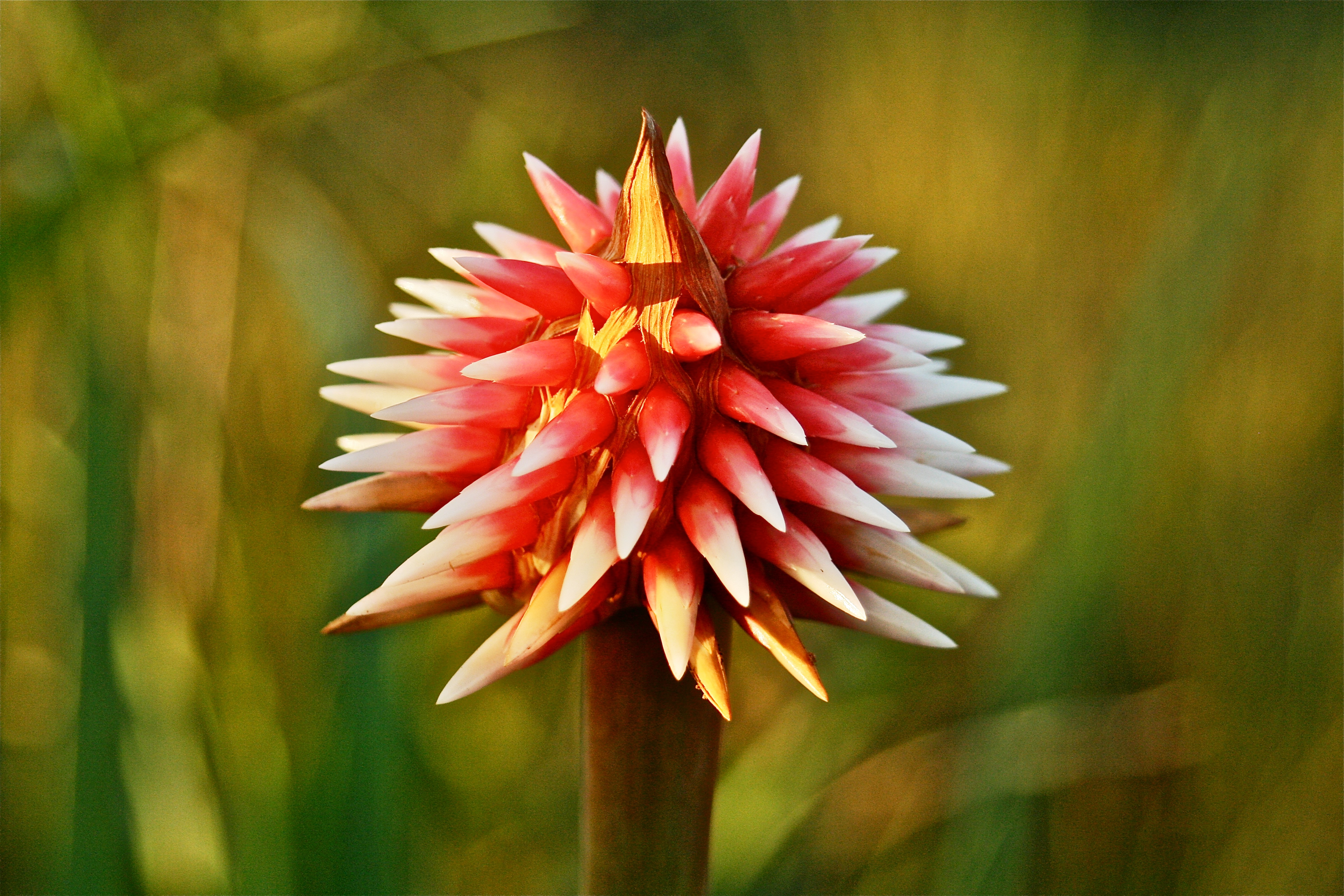

Scientific classification
- Kingdom: Plantae
- Clade: Tracheophytes
- Clade: Angiosperms
- Clade: Monocots
- Clade: Commelinids
- Order: Poales
- Family: Rapateaceae
- Genus: Guacamaya; Maguire
- Species: G. superba

Binomial name
- Guacamaya superba Maguire

= Guacamaya superba =

Species of flowering plant

Guacamaya is a group of plants in the family Rapateaceae described as a genus in 1931.

The only known species is Guacamaya superba, native to the Río Guainía region along the border of Colombia (Vaupés and Guainía) and Venezuela (Amazonas).
