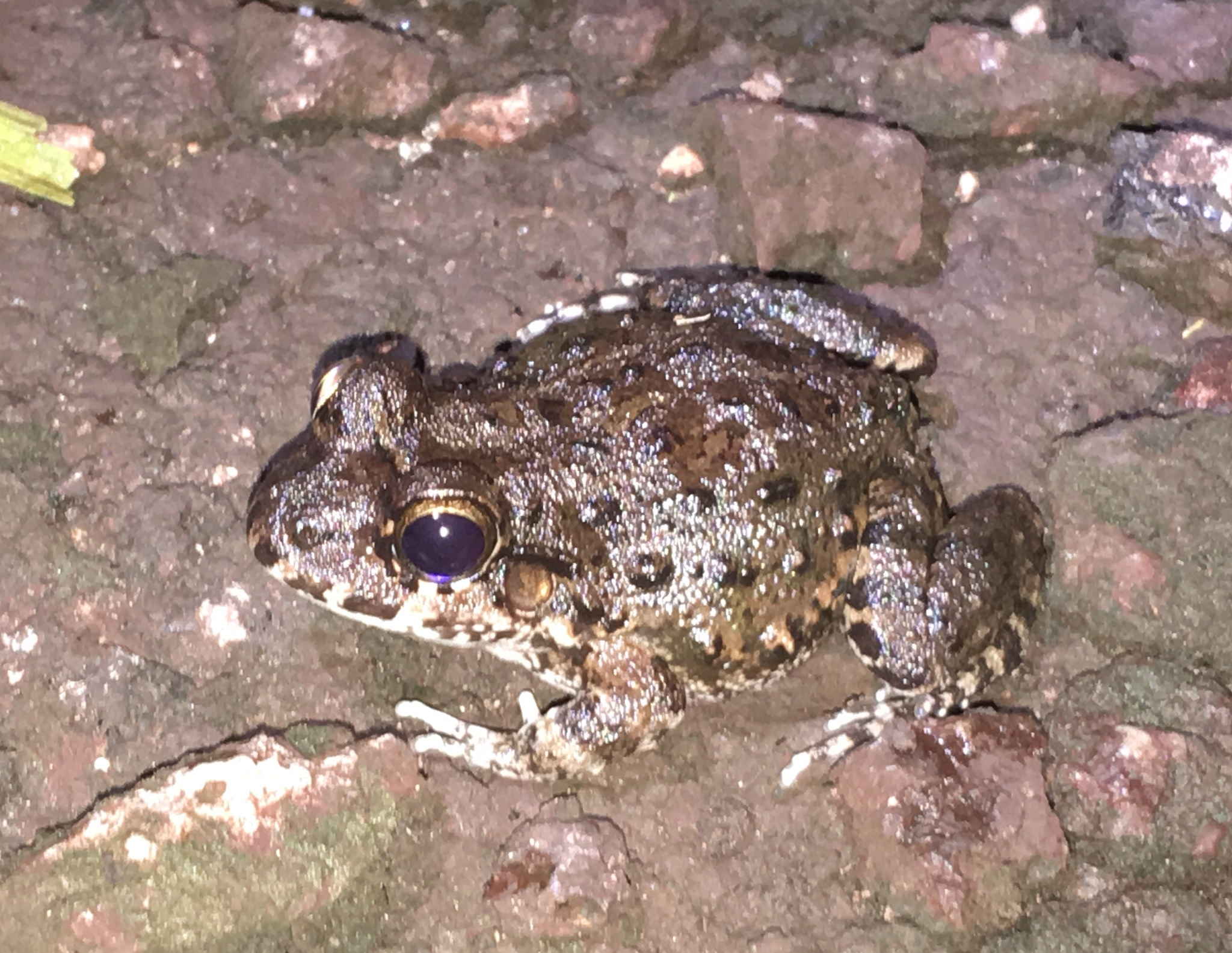

Conservation status
- Least Concern (IUCN 3.1)

Scientific classification
- Kingdom: Animalia
- Phylum: Chordata
- Class: Amphibia
- Order: Anura
- Family: Leptodactylidae
- Genus: Leptodactylus
- Species: L. lithonaetes

Binomial name
- Leptodactylus lithonaetes Heyer, 1995

= Leptodactylus lithonaetes =

Species of frog

Leptodactylus lithonaetes is a species of frog in the family Leptodactylidae. It is found in Colombia, Venezuela, and possibly Brazil.

== Body ==
The adult frog is 28-36 mm long.. There is some webbed skin on the feet. There are warts and folded skin on the backs of most adults. Most adults have 6-8 spots on their backs. The back and top of the head are brown in color.

== Habitat ==
This nocturnal frog is found in rocky habitats places with granite and sandstone, near forest. Scientists have found it between 89 and 1650 meters above sea level.

Scientists have reported the frog in protected places: Orinoco-Casiquiare Biosphere Reserve, Cinaruco–Capanaparo National Park, Yapacana National Park, and Parque Nacional Natural El Tuparro.

== Reproduction ==
This frog makes a foam nest for its eggs. The tadpoles live in moist habitats, such as mossy areas or rocks with at least a thin film of water. Some scientists have reported them to have semi-terrestrial habits.

== Threats ==
The IUCN and Venezuelan Fauna Red List both classify this frog as least concern of extinction. In some areas, fires pose some threat.
