= Rio Convention =

Group of three international environmental agreements

Rio Convention relates to the following three conventions, which were agreed at the Earth Summit held in Rio de Janeiro in June 1992.

At the Earth Summit, the decision-making process was tailored to promote a sustainable planet for future generations. The key message entailed the idea that changes in behaviour could be the foundation needed for progress toward the desired transformation for the environment. The resulting documentation from the two-week deliberations and meetings included the following: Agenda 21 (a non-binding action plan of the United Nations promoting sustainable development), the Statement of Forest Principles, the Rio Declaration on Environment and Development, and the following Conventions were formed:

1. UNFCCC, the abbreviation of United Nations Framework Convention on Climate Change
2. CBD, the abbreviation of Convention on Biological Diversity
3. UNCCD, the abbreviation of United Nations Convention to Combat Desertification

== History ==
The United Nations Conference on Environment and Development (UNCED), also known as the Rio de Janeiro Earth Summit, the Rio Summit, the Rio Conference, and the Earth Summit, took place in Rio de Janeiro from June 3 to 14th in 1992. The conference was unprecedented and aimed to reassess economic development to preserve natural resources and discuss the problem of pollution. The decision-making process was tailored to promote a sustainable planet for future generations. The key message entailed the idea that changes in behaviour could be the foundation needed for progress toward the desired transformation for the environment. The resulting documentation from the two-week deliberations and meetings included the following: Agenda 21 (a non-binding action plan of the United Nations promoting sustainable development), the Statement of Forest Principles, the Rio Declaration on Environment and Development, and the following Conventions were formed: the United Nations Framework Convention on Climate Change (UNFCCC), the United Nations Convention to Combat Desertification (UNCCD), and the United Nations Convention on Biological Diversity (CBD).

== Goals of the Three Rio Conventions ==
=== The Convention on Biological Diversity (CBD) ===
With 196 ratified parties, the Convention on Biological Diversity aims to conserve and protect biodiversity, biological resources and safeguard life on Earth, as an integral part of economic and social development. Considering biological diversity as a global asset to current and future generations and populations across the planet, the convention works to prevent species extinction and maintain protected habitats. As well, the CBD promotes the sustainable use of the components of biological diversity, and works to maintain the environmental and sustainable process of access and benefit sharing, derived from genetic resource use.

Established on December 29^{th,} 1993, the Convention on Biological Diversity works to maintain the following three objectives:

1. "The conservation of biological diversity"
2. "The sustainable use of the components of biological diversity"
3. "The fair and equitable sharing of the benefits arising out of the utilization of genetic resources"

The CBD currently follows the Strategic Plan for Biodiversity 2011-2020 and its Aichi Biodiversity Targets, used as a vehicle to maintain synergies at National levels. Its mission is to "take effective and urgent action to halt the loss of biodiversity to ensure that by 2020, ecosystems are resilient and continue to provide essential services, thereby securing the planet's variety of life, and contributing to human well-being, and poverty eradication."

=== The United Nations Framework Convention on Climate Change (UNFCCC) ===
With 197 ratified parties, the United Nations Framework Convention on Climate Change is committed to the objective of "[stabilizing] greenhouse gas concentrations in the atmosphere at a level that would prevent dangerous anthropogenic interference with the climate system. Such a level should be achieved within a time frame sufficient to allow ecosystems to adapt naturally to climate change, to ensure that food production is not threatened and to enable economic development to proceed in a sustainable manner." Following the adoption of the Paris Agreement in 2015 and previously the Kyoto Protocol in 1997, the UNFCCC Secretariat works to maintain the goals and objectives of the convention, as the primary United Nations body whose role functions to address the threat of climate change.

=== The United Nations Convention to Combat Desertification (UNCCD) ===
The United Nations Convention to Combat Desertification (UNCCD) functions as an international agreement that ties the sustainability of land management and the issues of land degradation to the environment. Among the areas of consideration, the Convention focuses on restoring degraded ecosystems found in dryland areas. The UNCCD, consisting of 197 parties works towards creating "a future that avoids, minimizes, and reverses desertification/land degradation and mitigates the effects of drought in affected areas at all levels."

Legislatively, the UNCCD is committed to achieving Land Degradation Neutrality (LDN) and combat pressing environmental issues of Desertification, land degradation and drought (DLDD) through a newly created 2018-2030 Strategic Framework, consistent with the 2030 Agenda for Sustainable Development This framework follows the 10-year strategic plan and framework for 2008-2018 that aimed to establish global partnerships in working toward the reversal and prevention of desertification and land degradation. The UNCCD aims to restore the productivity of degraded land, while improving livelihoods and aiding populations that are vulnerable because of environmental destruction. "The Convention's 197 parties work together to improve the living conditions for people in drylands, to maintain and restore land and soil productivity, and to mitigate the effects of drought."
