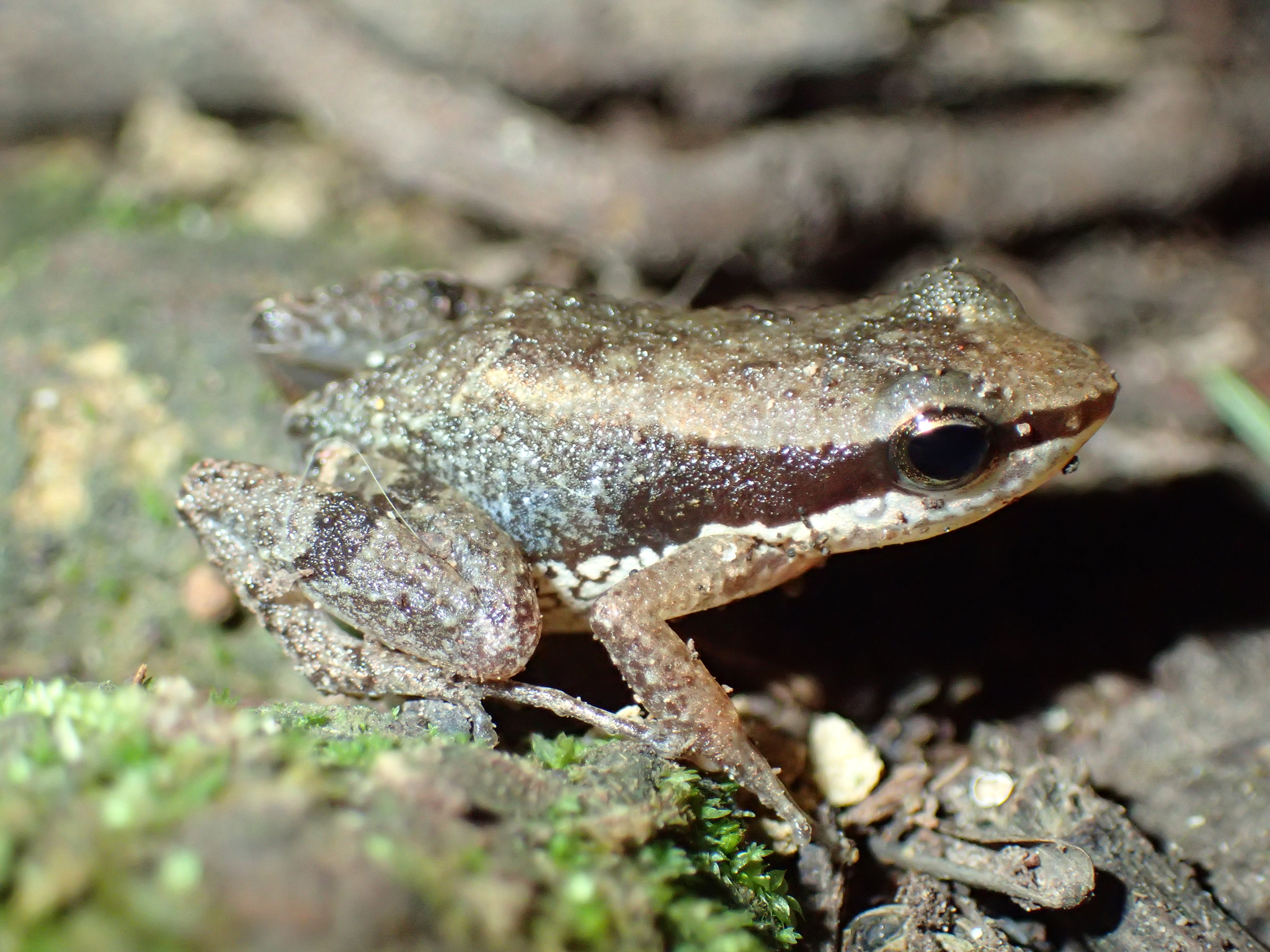

Conservation status
- Data Deficient (IUCN 3.1)

Scientific classification
- Kingdom: Animalia
- Phylum: Chordata
- Class: Amphibia
- Order: Anura
- Family: Aromobatidae
- Genus: Allobates
- Species: A. ornatus

Binomial name
- Allobates ornatus (Morales, 2000)

Synonyms
- Colostethus ornatus Morales, 2000

= Allobates ornatus =

Species of frog

Allobates ornatus is a species of frog in the family Aromobatidae. It is endemic to northern Peru where it is only known from near its type locality, Tarapoto in the San Martín Province, on the eastern slopes of the Cordillera Oriental.

== Description ==
Males grow to 17 mm (0.7 in) and females to 18 mm (0.7 in) in snout–vent length. The body is slender. The head is longer than it is wide. The snout is long and broadly truncate in dorsal view but rounded in lateral view. The tympanum is distinct and only barely obscured by the diffuse supratympanic fold above. The fingers and toes have expanded terminal discs. The fingers lack webbing, whereas the toes have basal webbing. Skin is smooth. The dorsum is tan with brown markings, including an interorbital bar, an X-shaped mark in the scapular region, and a triangular mark in the sacral region. A dark brown stripe starts from the tip of the snout and continues along the flanks as a broad stripe, bordered by pale yellow dorsolateral and ventrolateral stripes. The throat and belly are pale lemon yellow. The iris is greenish bronze.

== Reproduction ==
In most Allobates, the eggs are deposited in leaf litter; after hatching, the parents transport the tadpoles on their backs to small pools. However, at least two species, Allobates nidicola and Allobates chalcopis, have endotrophic tadpoles that develop into froglets terrestrially. The presence of very large eggs in a female Allobates ornatus suggests that this developmental strategy applies to this species too.

== Habitat and conservation ==
Allobates ornatus is known from disturbed lowland rainforest and humid montane forest at elevations of 350–680 m (1,150–2,230 ft) above sea level. Specimens have been found in leaf litter during the daytime. The ecology of this species is otherwise unknown. Specific threats to it are unknown, but habitat loss is a potential threat.
