= Allobates hodli =

Conservation status
- Least Concern (IUCN 3.1)

Scientific classification
- Kingdom: Animalia
- Phylum: Chordata
- Class: Amphibia
- Order: Anura
- Family: Aromobatidae
- Genus: Allobates
- Species: A. hodli

Binomial name
- Allobates hodli Simões, Lima, and Farias, 2010

Species of frog

Allobates hodli is a species of frog in the family Aromobatidae. It is endemic to Brazil.

== Taxonomy ==
Scientists used to think this was the same species as Allobates femoralis, but now they think they are two allopatric species. The most readily discernable difference is that A. hodli uses a two-note advertisement call and A. femoralis does not.

== Habitat ==
This terrestrial frog lives in forest habitats. it has been observed between 90 and 220 meters above sea level.

The frog has been found in several protected parks, including Parque Nacional Mapinguari.

== Reproduction ==
People have seen young frogs near streams. Scientists saw one clutch of tadpoles on the ground near a dead leaf.

== Threats ==
The IUCN classifies this frog as least concern of extinction. Its principal threat is habitat loss from forest conversion to livestock areas and farms and from flooding for hydroelectric dams. Mining, including illegal mining inside Parque Nacional Mapinguari, also poses some threat.
