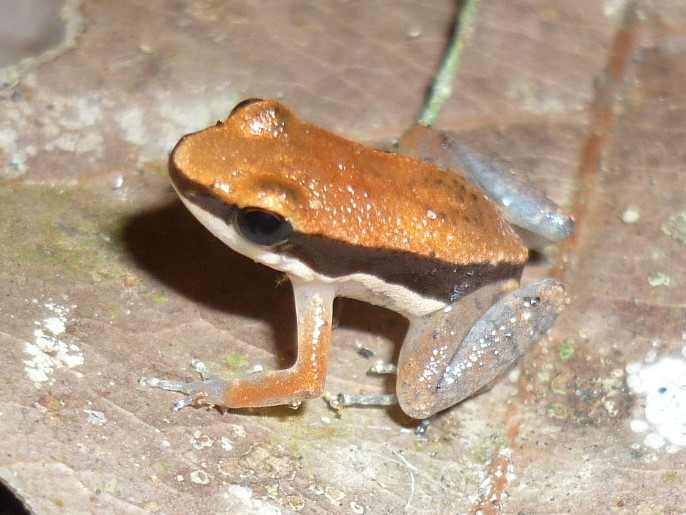

Conservation status
- Least Concern (IUCN 3.1)

Scientific classification
- Kingdom: Animalia
- Phylum: Chordata
- Class: Amphibia
- Order: Anura
- Family: Aromobatidae
- Genus: Allobates
- Species: A. sumtuosus

Binomial name
- Allobates sumtuosus (Morales, 2002)

Synonyms
- Colostethus sumtuosus Morales, 2002 "2000"; Allobates spumaponens =Kok and Ernst, 2007

= Allobates sumtuosus =

Species of frog

Allobates sumtuosus is a species of frog in the family Aromobatidae. It is known to occur in northern Brazil (Pará, Amazonas, and Roraima states), Loreto Region in eastern Peru, central Guyana, and southern Suriname; it may occur more widely in the intervening areas and also extend into Colombia. It might represent a species complex.

== Description ==
Adult males measure 13–16 mm (0.5–0.6 in) in snout–vent length. The tympanum is distinct and round. Discs of all fingers and toes are weakly expanded. The toes have some basal webbing. The body is robust. Dorsal coloration is solid tan brown to copper. Some individuals small, darker brown spots. The flanks are solid dark brown. Some individuals have a short, pale linear mark running laterally from inguinal region towards the midsection of the body. A white, iridescent ventrolateral stripe runs along the lower margin of the dark brown flanks, all way from tip of snout to the groin but often interrupted. Below the ventrolateral stripe, pale iridescent mottling is present over unpigmented background. The throat, gular, and pectoral regions, as well as the abdomen, are uniformly unpigmented, appearing light gray to translucent. Vocal sac in males is white to light gray, becoming translucent when inflated. The iris is golden copper with tiny black flecks.

There are two types of male advertisement calls. The first consists of regular trills of 23–35 short notes, lasting for about 5 seconds, and separated from each other by about 23 seconds. The interval between notes is short (about 0.1 seconds) and regular. Average peak frequency is about 6325 Hz. The second consists of continuously emitted notes, separated by silent intervals of variable duration (about 0.3 seconds). Average peak frequency is about 6200 Hz.

== Habitat and behavior ==
Allobates sumtuosus are diurnal and terrestrial. The area of the type locality is a mosaic of seasonally flooded (igapó) and unflooded (terra-firme) primary forests. In Guyana, Allobates sumtuosus were encountered both in primary and secondary forest representing a broad range of habitats, from well-drained mixed forest on white sand to mixed forest on gravely clay laterite.

Allobates sumtuosus lay small clutches of eggs (5–11) in leaf litter. After hatching, the tadpoles are carried on the back of the male, or rarely, female, until they are deposited in small temporary pools or moist leaf litter where they continue their development. On two occasions, however, the tadpoles were deposited in foam nests of other frogs, Physalaemus sp. and Leptodactylus rhodomystax. This appears to be a means of securing the tadpoles moist enough environment during dry periods; there is no indication that the tadpoles gain other benefits, such as consuming host eggs.

== Conservation ==
The IUCN classifies Allobates sumtuosus as least concern of extinction as of 2023. Logging may pose some threat in some parts of its range. The now-synonymized Allobates spumaponens was assessed as "data deficient" in 2008. The known distribution of Allobates sumtuosus, as now understood, has since expanded and includes many protected areas: Rio Trombetas Biological Reserve (the type locality of Allobates sumtuosus) and several others in Brazil, at least two protected areas in Peru, Mabura Hill Forest Reserve in Guyana (the type locality of Allobates spumaponens), and Sipaliwini Nature Reserve in Suriname. Its known range also overlaps with several other protected areas, even though it has not been formally reported within their boundaries: Estação Ecológica do Grão Pará, Floresta Nacional de Saracá-Taquera, Floresta do Parú, Reserva Biológica do Rio do Trombetas, Reserva Biológica de Maicurú, Floresta de Faro, and Reserva Florestal Adolpho Ducke.
