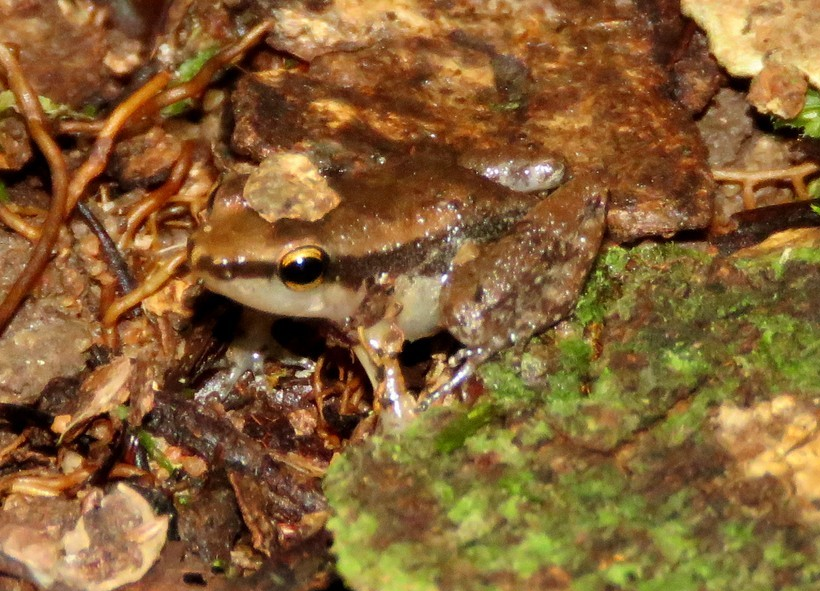

Conservation status
- Least Concern (IUCN 3.1)

Scientific classification
- Kingdom: Animalia
- Phylum: Chordata
- Class: Amphibia
- Order: Anura
- Family: Aromobatidae
- Genus: Allobates
- Species: A. tapajos

Binomial name
- Allobates tapajos Lima, Simões, and Kaefer, 2014

= Allobates tapajos =

Species of frog

Allobates tapajos is a species of frog in the family Dendrobatidae. It is endemic to Brazil and suspected in French Guiana and Suriname.

== Description ==
The adult male frog averages 17.78 mm in snout-vent length and the adult female frog 19.50 mm. The skin of the dorsum is dark and patterned, with three convenx marks, triangle and diamond. Most individuals have a diffuse stripe down each side of the body.

== Habitat ==
This frog lives in forests near clearwater streams. Scientists observed the frog 132 meters above sea level.

Scientists have recorded the frog's presence in several protected places, including Parque Nacional da Amazonia, Reserva Extrativista Tapajós-Arapiuns, and Floresta Nacional do Tapajós.

== Reproduction ==
The female frog lays eggs in a jelly nest that she puts on a rolled-up leaf. The rain falls onto the nest and dissolves the jelly to liquid. The tadpoles develop in the rainwater puddles.

The tadpoles have detectable papillae on their anterior areas.

== Threats ==
The IUCN classifies this species as least concern of extinction and cites no specific threats.
