= Allobates magnussoni =

Conservation status
- Least Concern (IUCN 3.1)

Scientific classification
- Kingdom: Animalia
- Phylum: Chordata
- Class: Amphibia
- Order: Anura
- Family: Aromobatidae
- Genus: Allobates
- Species: A. magnussoni

Binomial name
- Allobates magnussoni Lima, Simões, and Kaefer, 2014

Species of frog

Allobates magnussoni is a species of frog in the family Aromobatidae. It is endemic to Brazil.

== Description ==
The adult male frog measures 16.09–19.59 mm in snout-vent length and the adult female frog 17.97–20.84 mm. The skin of the dorsum is usually brown, suitably cryptic against the leaf litter. There is a mark in the shape of an hourglass on the frog's back. Most frogs also have a diffuse stripe on each side of the body. The upper surfaces of all four legs are brown too with darker brown patterns and bars. The lower surfaces can be yellow. The male frog has a gray-violet throat and chest. The male frog has a white abdomen with some yellow color near the back and sides. The female frog's belly is yellow throughout.

== Habitat ==
This frog lives in terra firma forests. Scientists observed the frog 132 meters above sea level.

The frog has been confirmed to live in several protected places, for example Parque Nacional da Amazonia, Estação Ecológica da Terra do Meio, and Reserva Extrativista Tapajós-Arapiuns and it is suspected in Floresta Nacional do Tapajós.

== Reproduction ==
The male frog has an advertisement call and a territorial call. The male frog makes a nest out of folded leaves in the leaf litter. The female frog chooses which male to approach. After the eggs hatch, both the male and female adult frogs carry the tadpoles to streams, where they swim and grow in the same areas as the adults live.

The tadpoles have light, iridescent spots on their backs, sides, and tails.

== Threats ==
The IUCN classifies this frog as least concern of extinction. It may be in some danger because people cut down too many trees and hydroelectric dam projects.
