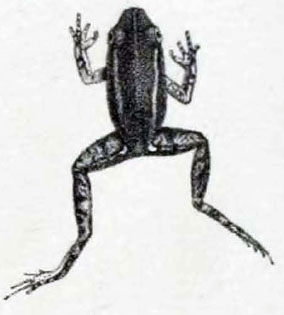
- Illustration from G. A. Boulenger's species description from 1884.

Conservation status
- Least Concern (IUCN 3.1)

Scientific classification
- Kingdom: Animalia
- Phylum: Chordata
- Class: Amphibia
- Order: Anura
- Family: Aromobatidae
- Genus: Allobates
- Species: A. trilineatus

Binomial name
- Allobates trilineatus (Boulenger, 1884)

Synonyms
- Phyllobates trilineatus Boulenger, 1884 "1883"; Colostethus trilineatus (Boulenger, 1884)

= Allobates trilineatus =

Species of frog

Allobates trilineatus (common name: three-striped rocket frog) is a species of frog in the family Aromobatidae. It is found in northern Bolivia and Peru east of the Cordillera Oriental and in western Brazil (Acre), possibly extending into Colombia. It has been confused with Allobates marchesianus.

== Description ==
The adult male frog measures 15.0-17-7 mm in snout-vent length and the adult female frog 15.2–19.3 mm long, making this species one of the smallest in the family. The skin of the dorsum is dark brown in color. The male frog has a gray throat with spots. There are dorsolateral and dorsoventral stripes down each side of the body. The flanks are dark brown in color.

== Habitat ==
This diurnal frog is found on the leaf litter in tropical forests between 100 and 250 meters above sea level. It has been observed in areas that have been subject to selective logging but does not seem to be located exclusively near water.

This frog's known range includes many protected parks, for example Parque Nacional Manu, Bahuaja-Sonene National Park, Tambopata Reserve, and Pacaya Samiria Reserve. It is suspected in or its range also overlaps Yasuni National Park, Área de Proteção Ambiental Igarapé São Francisco, Estação Ecológica Rio Acre, Reserva Biológica Limoncocha, Floresta Nacional do Macaua, Parque Nacional da Serra do Divisor, Parque Nacional Mapinguari, and Reserva Extrativista Arapixi.

== Reproduction ==
The female frog lays eggs on the ground. After the eggs hatch, the male frog carries the tadpoles to water.

== Threats ==
The IUCN classifies this frog as least concern of extinction. It is subject to some localized habitat loss associated with agriculture and livestock cultivation.
