= Allobates nunciatus =

Conservation status
- Least Concern (IUCN 3.1)

Scientific classification
- Kingdom: Animalia
- Phylum: Chordata
- Class: Amphibia
- Order: Anura
- Family: Aromobatidae
- Genus: Allobates
- Species: A. nunciatus

Binomial name
- Allobates nunciatus Moraes, Pavan, and Lima, 2019

Species of frog

Allobates nunciatus is a species of frog in the family Aromobatidae. It is endemic to Brazil.

== Body ==
The adult male frog measures 19.2–21.7 mm in snout-vent length and the adult female frog 19.3–22.0 mm. The skin of the dorsum is ochre in color. There is a dark brown lateral stripe and a cream stripe on each side of the body. The limbs can be ochre or orange in color. The male frog's chest and throat have some violet coloration and the female frog's chest and throat are yellow.

== Habitat ==
This frog lives near streams in terra firma forests and occasionally igapó forests. It is diurnal, and people have observed it between 82 and 221 meters above sea level.

The frog has been recorded in some protected areas, for example Floresta Nacional de Itaituba I and II and Floresta Nacional do Tapajós.

== Reproduction ==
The male frog sits on the leaf litter and calls to the female frogs. The female frog lays her eggs in a gelatinous nest in dry, dead leaves. After the eggs hatch, the male frog carries the tadpoles to water.

== Threats ==
The IUCN classifies this species as least concern of extinction and cites no specific threats.

== Original publication ==
- Carneiro de Lima Moraes LJ; D Pavan; AP Lima (2019). "A new nurse frog of Allobates masniger-nidicola complex (Anura, Aromobatidae) from the east bank of Tapajós River, eastern Amazonia". Zootaxa. 4648: 401–434.
