= Allobates sanmartini =

Conservation status
- Data Deficient (IUCN 3.1)

Scientific classification
- Kingdom: Animalia
- Phylum: Chordata
- Class: Amphibia
- Order: Anura
- Family: Aromobatidae
- Genus: Allobates
- Species: A. sanmartini

Binomial name
- Allobates sanmartini (Rivero, Langone & Prigione, 1986)

Synonyms
- Colostethus sanmartini Rivero, Langone & Prigioni, 1986

Species of amphibian

Allobates sanmartini is a species of frog in the family Aromobatidae. It is endemic to Venezuela.

== Habitat ==
The frog lives in the Caura River Basin. Scientists believe that the frog lives in subtropical or tropical moist lowland forest. The type locality is located 70 meters above sea level.

The frog's range includes two protected parks: Caura National Park and Jaua-Sarisariñama National Park.

== Reproduction ==
Scientists believe this frog reproduces and cares for its young the way other frogs in Allobates do: the female frog lays her eggs on the ground. After the eggs hatch, the adult frogs carry the tadpoles to water.

== Threat ==
The IUCN classifies this frog as data deficient with respect to threats and extinction. However, it lives in the Caura River Basin, which is subject to deforestation in favor of logging, urban development, and both legal and illegal mining.
