= Allobates carajas =

Conservation status
- Least Concern (IUCN 3.1)

Scientific classification
- Kingdom: Animalia
- Phylum: Chordata
- Class: Amphibia
- Order: Anura
- Family: Aromobatidae
- Genus: Allobates
- Species: A. carajas

Binomial name
- Allobates carajas Simões, Rojas, and Lima, 2019

Species of frog

Allobates carajas is a species of frog in the family Aromobatidae. It is endemic to Brazil.

== Description ==
The frog measures about 16.5–19.1 mm in snout-vent length. There is a dark brown hourglass mark on the dorsum. Both male and female frogs have some bright yellow coloration.

== Habitat ==
This frog lives in the Amazon biome. It has been found exclusively in unmodified closed-canopy forests.

The frog has been found in one protected park, Floresta Nacional de Carajás.

== Reproduction ==
The male frog sits on rocks or leaves and calls to the female frogs. The female frog lays her eggs on leaves. After the eggs hatch, the adult frogs carry the tadpoles to water.

== Threats ==
The IUCN classifies this frog as least concern of extinction. About 30 percent of its population is in an area somewhat subject to deforestation in favor of agriculture and livestock grazing.
