= Allobates humilis =

Conservation status
- Endangered (IUCN 3.1)

Scientific classification
- Kingdom: Animalia
- Phylum: Chordata
- Class: Amphibia
- Order: Anura
- Family: Aromobatidae
- Genus: Allobates
- Species: A. humilis

Binomial name
- Allobates humilis (Rivero, 1978)

Synonyms
- Colostethus humilis Rivero, 1978

Species of frog

Allobates humilis (common name: Bocono rocket frog) is a species of frog in the family Aromobatidae. It is endemic to western Venezuela where it is known from the Trujillo and Barinas states.

== Habitat ==
Its natural habitats are seasonal montane forest and cloud forest in the Venezuelan Andes, where it has been observed between 1100 and 1470 meters above sea level. This locally common frog is associated with temporary ponds.

This frog has been observed in one protected park: Parque Nacional Guaramacal.

== Threats ==
The IUCN classifies this frog as endangered. It is threatened by habitat loss in favor of human habitation and infrastructure; the lagoon at the type locality (near Boconó) has already disappeared.
