= Allobates mandelorum =

Conservation status
- Endangered (IUCN 3.1)

Scientific classification
- Kingdom: Animalia
- Phylum: Chordata
- Class: Amphibia
- Order: Anura
- Family: Aromobatidae
- Genus: Allobates
- Species: A. mandelorum

Binomial name
- Allobates mandelorum (Schmidt, 1932)

Synonyms
- Colostethus mandelorum (Schmidt, 1932)

Species of frog

Allobates mandelorum (common name: Mount Turumiquire rocket frog) is a species of frog in the family Aromobatidae. It is endemic to the Cerro Turumiquire (also spelled Cerro Turimiquire) area in eastern Venezuela.

== Habitat ==
This frog lives in riparian habitats in cloud forests, subpáramo, and shrubland. Scientists saw the frog between 1900 and 2630 meters above sea level.

The frog's known range includes many protected parks, for example Macizo de Turmiquire Protective Zone of Rivers.

== Reproduction ==
Little is known about this frog's reproductive habits, but scientists infer that the eggs hatch on land and that the male frog carries the tadpoles to water.

== Threats ==
The IUCN classifies this frog as endangered. The principal threat is habitat loss from fires and conversion of forest to small-scale agriculture, conversion of forest to livestock cultivation, and agrochemicals. Rerouting waterways for irrigation also alters habitat. Some scientists believe that the fungal disease chytridiomycosis could affect this population, but the causative pathogen has yet to be detected in this frog.
