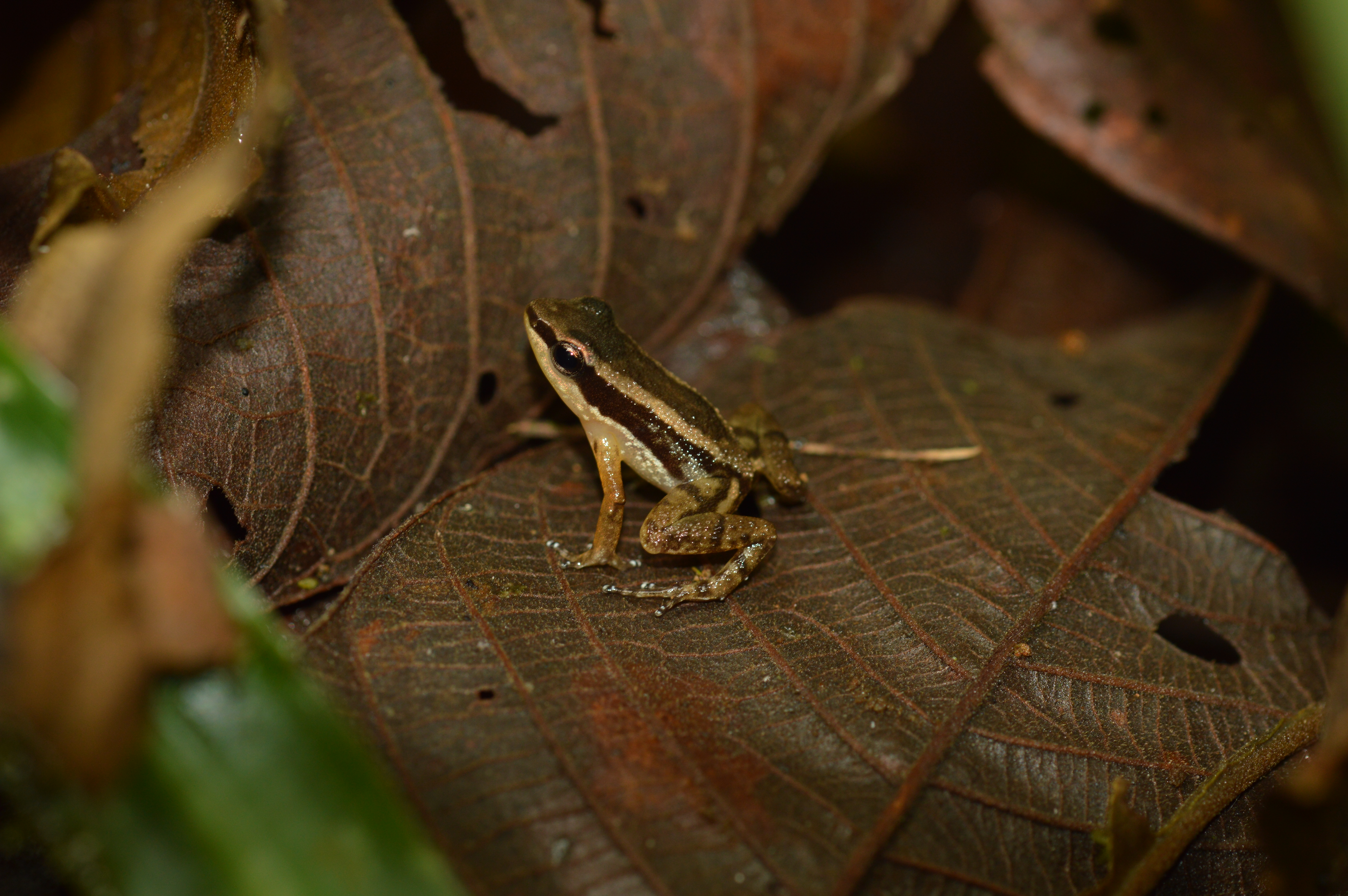

Conservation status
- Least Concern (IUCN 3.1)

Scientific classification
- Kingdom: Animalia
- Phylum: Chordata
- Class: Amphibia
- Order: Anura
- Family: Aromobatidae
- Genus: Allobates
- Species: A. insperatus

Binomial name
- Allobates insperatus (Morales, 2000)

Synonyms
- Colostethus insperatus Morales, 2000

= Allobates insperatus =

Species of frog

Allobates insperatus is a species of frog in the family Aromobatidae. It is endemic to Amazonian slopes of eastern Ecuador; its range, however, extends to near the Colombian border and it may occur in that country too.

== Description ==
The adult male frog measures about 16.02 millimetres (0.631 in) in snout-vent length and the adult female about 16.25 millimetres (0.640 in). The skin of the dorsum is brown in color with a light brown ventrolateral stripe and a dark brown dorsolinear stripe. The ventrum can be cream or yellow-white in color. The throat can be cream-yellow or light gray in color.

== Habitat ==
This frog has been spotted hiding near tree roots, in palm leaves, and on leaf litter. It inhabits primary and secondary forest. Unlike many of its congeners, it does not need to live near streams. Scientists have seen the frog between 250 and 570 meters above sea level.

Scientists have seen the frog inside Güeppi-Sekime National Park. Its known range overlaps with several other protected areas, including Parque Nacional Cuyabeno, Parque Nacional Yasuní, Parque Nacional Sumaco Napo-Galeras.

== Reproduction ==
This frog does not need to live near streams. Its tadpoles have been obeserved swim in streams but also the water that collects in fallen palm plants and bamboo plants and in small pools of water.

== Threats ==
The International Union for the Conservation of Nature classifies this frog as least concern of extinction worldwide. The government of Ecuador classifies it as near threatened within the nation's borders. Its habitat is threatened by agriculture, logging, and oil exploration.

== Original description ==
- Morales, V. R. (2002). "Sistematica y biogeografía del grupo trilineatus (Amphibia, Anura, Dendrobatidae, Colostethus), con descripción de once nuevas especies". Publicaciones de la Asociación de Amigos de Doñana (in Spanish). 13: 1–59.
