= Allobates bromelicola =

Conservation status
- Vulnerable (IUCN 3.1)

Scientific classification
- Kingdom: Animalia
- Phylum: Chordata
- Class: Amphibia
- Order: Anura
- Family: Aromobatidae
- Genus: Allobates
- Species: A. bromelicola

Binomial name
- Allobates bromelicola (Test, 1956)

Synonyms
- Phyllobates bromelicola Test, 1956; Colostethus bromelicola Edwards, 1971; Allobates bromelicola Grant, Frost, Caldwell, Gagliardo, Haddad, Kok, Means, Noonan, Schargel, and Wheeler, 2006

Species of frog

Allobates bromelicola (common name: coastal rocket frog) is a species of frog in the family Aromobatidae. It is endemic to the Venezuelan Coastal Range in the Aragua state.

== Habitat ==
This arboreal, diurnal frog has been found in close association with bromeliad plants growing in cloud forests between 1310 and 1375 meters above sea level.

The frog's known range overlaps one protected area, Henri Pittier National Park.

== Reproduction ==
Scientists have observed tadpoles swimming in phytotelms of bromeliad plants and infer that the female frog lays her eggs in or on these plants. There are no recorded cases of an adult frog being observed carrying tadpoles to water, as in other species in Allobates.

== Threats ==
The IUCN classifies this frog as vulnerable to extinction. Although the ability of the fungus Batrachochytrium dendrobatidis to infect this species has not been confirmed, scientists suspect the fungal disease chytridiomycosis as a threat.
