= Allobates melanolaemus =

Conservation status
- Least Concern (IUCN 3.1)

Scientific classification
- Kingdom: Animalia
- Phylum: Chordata
- Class: Amphibia
- Order: Anura
- Family: Aromobatidae
- Genus: Allobates
- Species: A. melanolaemus

Binomial name
- Allobates melanolaemus (Grant & Rodríguez, 2001)

Synonyms
- Colostethus melanolaemus Grant & Rodríguez, 2001

Species of frog

Allobates melanolaemus is a species of frog in the family Aromobatidae. It is endemic to Peru where it is only known from near its type locality in the Loreto Province.

== Habitat ==
This little-known diurnal frog inhabits tropical moist lowland forest.

Scientists believe the frog could live in Tamshiyacu-Tahuayo Regional Conservation Area but have yet to formally record its presence there.

== Reproduction ==
Scientists believe the frog reproduces in the same manner as its congeners: The female lays eggs on leaf litter, and the adults carry the tadpoles to streams for further development.

== Threats ==
The IUCN classifies this species as least concern of extinction. Humans rarely visit its range, though some tourism projects were in planning as of 2018, and there are large stretches of suitable habitat remaining.
