= Allobates tinae =

Conservation status
- Least Concern (IUCN 3.1)

Scientific classification
- Kingdom: Animalia
- Phylum: Chordata
- Class: Amphibia
- Order: Anura
- Family: Aromobatidae
- Genus: Allobates
- Species: A. tinae

Binomial name
- Allobates tinae Melo-Sampaio, Oliveira, and Prates, 2018

Species of frog

Allobates tinae is a frog in the family Aromobatidae. It is endemic to Brazil.

== Habitat ==
This diurnal, terrestrial frog is endemic to the Amazon biome, where it is found on the leaf litter in forests.

The frog's range overlaps with known protected parks, including Floresta Nacional do Iquiri and Parque Estadual de Guajará-Mirím.

== Reproduction ==
Scientists infer that this frog cares for its young in the same manner as other species in Allobates: The female frog lays eggs on land. After the eggs hatch, the male frogs carry the tadpoles to water. As of 2023, this has yet to be conclusively observed.

== Threats ==
The IUCN classifies this frog as least concern of extinction and cites no specific threats.

== Original description ==
- Melo-Sampaio PR; de Oliveira RM; Prates I (2018). "A new nurse frog from Brazil (Aromobatidae: Allobates), with data on the distribution and phenotypic variation of western Amazonian species". South American Journal of Herpetology (Abstract). 13 (2): 131–149. doi:10.2994/SAJH-D-17-00098.1.
