= Allobates sieggreenae =

Scientific classification
- Kingdom: Animalia
- Phylum: Chordata
- Class: Amphibia
- Order: Anura
- Family: Aromobatidae
- Genus: Allobates
- Species: A. sieggreenae

Binomial name
- Allobates sieggreenae Gagliardi-Urrutia, Castroviejo-Fisher, Rojas-Runjaic, Jaramillo-Martinez, Solís, and Simões, 2021

Species of frog

Allobates sieggreenae is a species of frog in the family Aromobatidae. It is endemic to Peru.

== Description ==
The adult male frog measures 15.2–16.4 mm in snout-vent length and the adult female frog 15.4–17.2 mm. The skin of the dorsum is light brown in color. There are straight stripes on the sides of the body. The adult male frog has a white or cream-colored throat and vocal sac. It has some yellow color on the ventral side near where the hind legs meet the body. The adult female frog has a yellow throat and belly.

Young frogs are darker brown in color, so the stripe is more visible. They have no yellow color.

== Habitat ==
This frog lives in Amazon forest and white sand forest.

== Threats ==
Scientists say this frog is not in danger of dying out. Its habitat is far from cities.
