= Allobates amissibilis =

Conservation status
- Vulnerable (IUCN 3.1)

Scientific classification
- Kingdom: Animalia
- Phylum: Chordata
- Class: Amphibia
- Order: Anura
- Family: Aromobatidae
- Genus: Allobates
- Species: A. amissibilis

Binomial name
- Allobates amissibilis Kok, Hölting, and Ernst, 2013

Species of frog

Allobates amissibilis is a species of frog in the family Aromobatidae. It is endemic to Guyana.

== Description ==
The adult frog measures 16.3 to 17.8 mm in snout-vent length. There is a wide stripe on each side of the body from the midbody to the groin. The adult male frog has a pink-gray throat with dark marks and the adult female frog has a cream or yellow throat.

== Habitat ==
This frog lives in lowland and premontane forests in the Iwokrama Mountains, where it has been observed between 160 and 950 meters above sea level. The frog's known range is within a protected preserve.

== Reproduction ==
Scientists know little about A. amissibilis' reproductive pattern. Other frogs in Allobates lay their eggs on land. After the eggs hatch, the adult frogs carry the tadpoles to water. This has yet to be reported for A. amissibilis.

== Threats ==
The IUCN classifies this frog as vulnerable to extinction. There is some tourism in its range. Scientists do not consider it a threat at present but it could become so if it leads to too much habitat loss or to the introduction of diseases.
