= Allobates ignotus =

Conservation status
- Endangered (IUCN 3.1)

Scientific classification
- Kingdom: Animalia
- Phylum: Chordata
- Class: Amphibia
- Order: Anura
- Family: Aromobatidae
- Genus: Allobates
- Species: A. ignotus

Binomial name
- Allobates ignotus Anganoy-Criollo, 2012

Species of frog

Allobates ignotus, the nurse frog of the Serranía de Perijá, is a species of frog in the family Aromobatidae. It is endemic to Colombia.

== Description ==
The adult male frog measures 16.4–18.3 mm (0.65–0.72 in) long in snout-vent length and the adult female 16.9–20.9 mm (0.67–0.82 in). Adults have three stripes on each side of their bodies. The adults are brown in color with darker marks on the back and head. The forelegs are dull yellow in color. Female frogs have yellow hind legs. There are dark brown rings on all four legs.

== Habitat ==
This diurnal frog lives in humid forests. Scientists saw them near streams and on leaf litter. People have also seen the frogs in fields where people grow amapola and marijuana. Scientists observed the frog between 400 and 900 m (1,310 and 2,950 ft) above sea level.

== Reproduction ==
The tadpoles develop near the edges of streams. At stage 29, the tadpole can measure 19.4 mm (0.76 in) in length. Its body is oval in shape. The tail is longer than the rest of the body. The nose is round. The skin is transparent, and the intestines are visible to the naked eye.

== Threats ==
The IUCN classifies this frog as endangered. Although it has shown some tolerance to habitat disturbance and has been found on farmland, the herbicides and pesticides from those farms can enter the waterways that the frog uses to breed. It is also subject to habitat loss in favor of livestock grazing, and the many coal mines in its range pose their own threat.

== Original description ==
- Anganoy-Criollo M (2012). "A new species of Allobates (Anura,Dendrobatidae) from the western flank of the Serrania de Perija, Colombia". Zootaxa. 3308: 49–62.
