= Allobates subfolionidificans =

Conservation status
- Least Concern (IUCN 3.1)

Scientific classification
- Kingdom: Animalia
- Phylum: Chordata
- Class: Amphibia
- Order: Anura
- Family: Aromobatidae
- Genus: Allobates
- Species: A. subfolionidificans

Binomial name
- Allobates subfolionidificans (Lima, Sanchez, and Souza, 2007)

Synonyms
- Colostethus subfolionidificans Lima, Sanchez, and Souza, 2007

Species of frog

Allobates subfolionidificans is a species of frog in the family Aromobatidae. It is endemic to the state Acre, Brazil.

== Habitat ==
This frog is endemic to Amazon biomes, where it has been found in remaining primary forest and in secondary forest in various stages of regrowth. Scientists have observed the frog 136 meters above sea level.

The frog has been observed in several protected parks, including Área de Proteção Ambiental Igarapé São Francisco, Área de Proteção Raimundo Irineu Serra, and Parque Zoobotânico da Universidade Federal do Acre.

== Reproduction ==
The male frog perches on leaves or branches in the leaf litter. The female frog lays her eggs on the undersides of leaves between 0 and 10 cm above the ground, one clutch per leaf. There are 8–10 eggs in per clutch. The eggs are white in color.

The tadpoles develop on the undersides of the leaves until stage 25. Then the male frog carries them to water, where they swim and grow into froglets.

Male frogs average 1–3 clutches per season.

== Threats ==
The IUCN classifies this frog as least concern of extinction. However, it is an obligate forest dweller. In the eastern part of its range, it faces some threat from deforestation in favor of agriculture and urbanization.

== Original publication ==
- Lima AP; Sanchez DEA; Souza JRD (2007). "A new Amazonian species of the frog genus Colostethus (Dendrobatidae) that lays its eggs on undersides of leaves". Copeia: 114–122.
