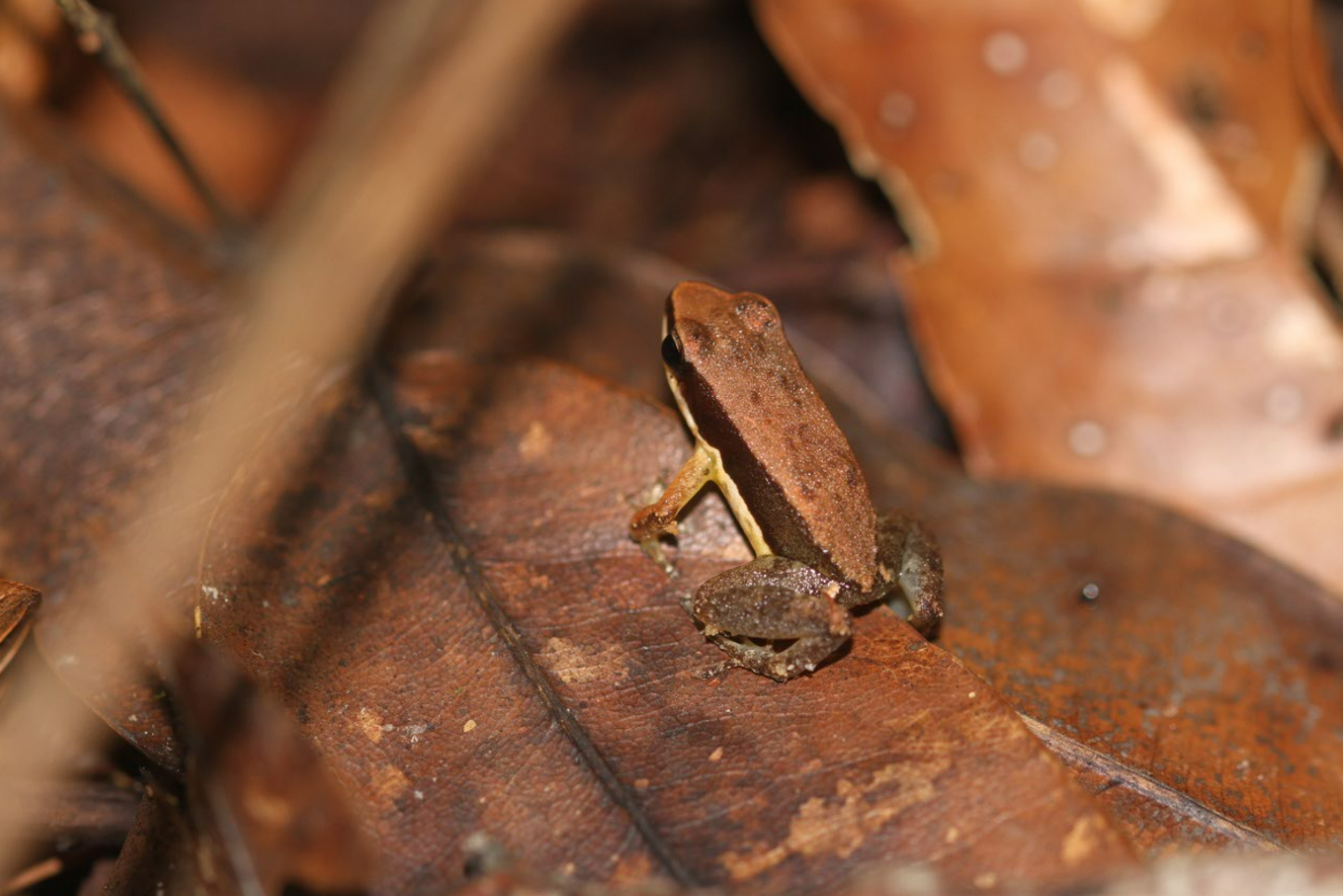

Conservation status
- Least Concern (IUCN 3.1)

Scientific classification
- Kingdom: Animalia
- Phylum: Chordata
- Class: Amphibia
- Order: Anura
- Family: Aromobatidae
- Genus: Allobates
- Species: A. granti

Binomial name
- Allobates granti (Kok, MacCulloch, Gaucher, Poelman, Bourne, Lathrop, and Lenglet, 2006)

Synonyms
- Colostethus granti Kok, MacCulloch, Gaucher, Poelman, Bourne, Lathrop, and Lenglet, 2006

= Allobates granti =

Species of frog

Allobates granti, the black-flanked poison frog, is a species of frog in the family Aromobatidae. It is endemic to French Guiana and Suriname and suspected in Brazil.

== Home ==
This diurnal, forest-dwelling frog has been observed between 100 and 730 meters above sea level. It does not seem to need to remain near water.

This frog has been observed in one protected park: Parc Amazonien de Guyane.

== Young ==
Male frogs can be territorial. They perch on the leaf litter to call to the female frogs. The female can lay eggs at any time of the year. Scientists observed one clutch with nine fertilized eggs in it.

== Threats ==
The IUCN classifies this frog as least concern of extinction. Illegal gold mining in the Parc Amazonien de Guyane poses some localized threat.

== Original publication ==
- Kok; MacCulloch; Gaucher; Poelman; Bourne; Lathrop; Lenglet (2006). "A new species of Colostethus (Anura, Dendrobatidae) from French Guiana with a rediscription of Colostethus beebei (Noble,1923) from its type locality". Phyllomedusa. 5 (1): 43–66.
