= Allobates pacaas =

Conservation status
- Vulnerable (IUCN 3.1)

Scientific classification
- Kingdom: Animalia
- Phylum: Chordata
- Class: Amphibia
- Order: Anura
- Family: Aromobatidae
- Genus: Allobates
- Species: A. pacaas

Binomial name
- Allobates pacaas Melo-Sampaio, Prates, Peloso, Recoder, Vechio, Marques-Souza, and Rodrigues, 2020

Species of frog

Allobates pacaas is a species of frog in the family Aromobatidae. It is endemic to Brazil.

== Description ==
This frog has metallic orange pigmentation on its back.

== Habitat ==
This frog lives in grassland and gallery forest habitats, specifically cerrados and savannas, in Serra dos Pacaás Novos in the state of Rondônia. It lives on plateaus high above the surrounding area. Scientists observed exclusively near a single stream that flowed through a gallery forest and shrubby grassland. The frogs do not seem to depend on the stream itself but rather on the increased humidity associated with it. Scientists observed the frog between 200 and 1230 meters above sea level.

The frog's entire known range is within Parque Nacional de Pacaás Novos. This park is inside the Uru-Eu-Wau-Wau Indigenous Area, which is part of the largest stretch of undisturbed Amazon forest in the state.

== Reproduction ==
There was no rain during the survey to the frog's range, so the scientists did not observe the frogs seeking mates or caring for young. They infer this species reproduces in the same manner other frogs in Allobates: The female frog lays eggs on the leaf litter and the tadpoles develop in water.

== Threats ==
The IUCN classifies this frog as vulnerable to extinction, largely due to deforestation in favor of large-scale agriculture, livestock grazing, and other development. Illegal logging and mining also pose a significant threat.

IUCN scientists note that the frog is in more danger than other species because of its highland habitat. It already occupies the greatest elevations in its area and cannot simply climb to a higher one of the climate should change. Migrating to a cooler area would be similarly difficult given that it would require descending into a hotter one first.
