= Allobates caldwellae =

Scientific classification
- Kingdom: Animalia
- Phylum: Chordata
- Class: Amphibia
- Order: Anura
- Family: Aromobatidae
- Genus: Allobates
- Species: A. caldwellae

Binomial name
- Allobates caldwellae Lima, Ferrão, and Silva, 2020

Species of frog

Allobates caldwellae is a species of frog in the family Aromobatidae. It is endemic to Brazil.

== Description ==
The adult male frog measures 14.4–16.9 mm in snout-vent length and the adult female frog 16.6–16.9 mm. The skin of the dorsum is light brown in color with darker spots. The adult male frog has a yellow-gold throat and vocal sac. There is a dark dorsolateral stripe that starts at the eye and goes down the body. There is a darker brown stripe immediately below each. There is also a broken iridescent-white stripe from the ear to the middle of the body. The upper surfaces of the front legs are orange-brown and the upper surfaces of the hind legs are brown with dark spots. The adult female frog has yellow coloration on the undersides of her legs and the adult male frog has translucent skin there. There is a moon-shaped mark near the cloacal area.

Young froglets are brown in color with light brown stripes.

== Etymology ==
Scientists named this frog for Dr. Janalee P. Caldwell, former curator of the Sam Noble Museum of Natural History. Caldwell mentored one of the scientists who wrote the first formal description of the frog, Dr. Lima.

== Habitat ==
This frog lives in dense ombrophilous forests. Scientists saw the frog 50 meters above sea level.

== Reproduction ==
The male frog perches on folded or overlapping leaves on the forest floor and calls to the female frogs. The female frog lays eggs in a gel nest. After the eggs hatch, the male frogs carry the tadpoles to water.

At stage 36, the tadpole measures 6.5–7.0 mm in body and 21.5–22.5 mm long in both body and tail. The tadpole is brown in color.

== Threats ==
The IUCN has not yet assessed this frog. It may be subject to habitat loss, especially related to logging.
