= Allobates gasconi =

Conservation status
- Least Concern (IUCN 3.1)

Scientific classification
- Kingdom: Animalia
- Phylum: Chordata
- Class: Amphibia
- Order: Anura
- Family: Aromobatidae
- Genus: Allobates
- Species: A. gasconi

Binomial name
- Allobates gasconi (Morales, 2002)

Synonyms
- Colostethus gasconi Morales, 2002

Species of frog

Allobates gasconi is a species of frog in the family Dendrobatidae. It is endemic to the Acre and Amazonas states of Brazil and to the Yuyapichis River area in Peru.

== Habitat ==
The frog's natural habitat is Amazon várzea forest, which floods periodically. It has been observed in both primary and secondary forest, and it can tolerate some level of habitat disturbance. Scientists have seen the frog between 100 and 250 meters above sea level.

The frog's range includes many protected parks, including Parque Ambiental Chico Mendes and Reserva Extrativista do Baixo Juruá.

== Reproduction ==
The female frog lays eggs on land. After the eggs hatch, the adult frogs carry the tadpoles to water.

== Threats ==
The IUCN classifies this frog as least concern of extinction, though fires and logging do pose some threat, particularly in the northern parts of its range.

== Original description ==
- Morales, V.R. (2000). "Sistematica y Biogeografia del Grupotrilineatus (Amphibia, Anura, Dendrobatidae, Colostethus), con Descripcion de Once Nuevas Especies". Publicaciones de la Asociacion Amigos de Donana: 1–59.
