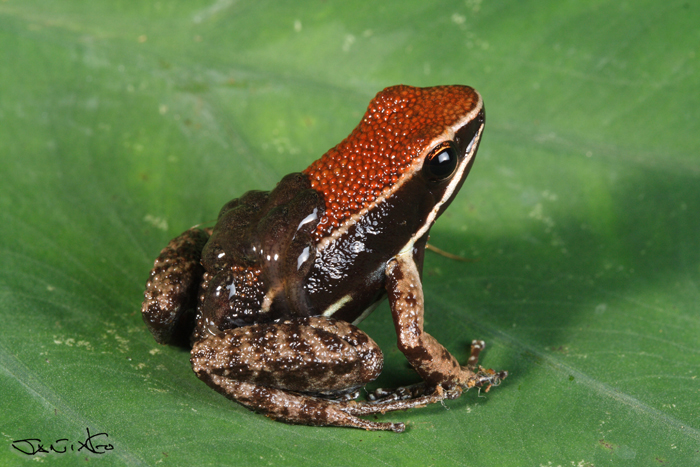

Conservation status
- Least Concern (IUCN 3.1)
- CITES Appendix II

Scientific classification
- Kingdom: Animalia
- Phylum: Chordata
- Class: Amphibia
- Order: Anura
- Family: Aromobatidae
- Genus: Allobates
- Species: A. zaparo

Binomial name
- Allobates zaparo (Silverstone, 1976)

= Allobates zaparo =

Sanguine poison frog

Species of amphibian

Allobates zaparo, the sanguine poison frog or Zaparo's poison frog (in Spanish rana venenosa) is a species of frog in the family Aromobatidae. It is native to Ecuador and Peru, where it lives in tropical rainforest habitat.

== Description ==
The adult male frog measures 27.0 to 30.5 mm in snout-vent length and the adult female frog 26.5–30.5 mm. The skin of the dorsum is red or brick in color with light brown or copper colored lines that start on the snout. The sides of the head and body are black in color, bordered with a brown stripe on top and a white on the bottom. The white stripe may turn blue toward the rear of the body. There is a green-yellow mark on the lip. The upper surfaces of the forelegs are light brown in color with black or dark brown spots. There is yellow or orange color in the axilliary region. The upper surfaces of the hind legs are black in color with blue-gray marks. The undersides of the hind legs or blue in color with black marks. The throat and chest are black in color but may have some blue. The blue becomes an orange stripe near where the front legs meet the body. The belly is blue with black marks. The iris of the eye is black in color with some bronze or copper near the pupil.

=== Poison ===
This frog does not have poison chemicals in its skin, but its coloration resembles that of other frogs in Dendrobatidae that do, making it a Batesian mimic. A. zaparo most closely resembles A. bilinguis, which is moderately toxic, rather than other frogs in the area with more potent chemical defenses. Scientists believe this is because animals that attempt to prey on moderately toxic frogs learn exactly they look like rather than developing a more generalized aversion.

== Etymology ==
Scientists named this frog zaparo for the Sápara people who live in eastern Ecuador.

== Habitat ==
This diurnal frog has been observed in forests in lowlands and on rolling hills, largely primary but occasionally secondary forest and riparian habitats near farmland. It spends time on the leaf litter. Scientists saw the frog between 200 and 1000 meters above sea level.

People have seen this frog in many protected parks: Yasuní National Park, Sangay National Park, Yachana Reserve, and Jatun Sacha Biological Station.

== Diet ==
This frog has a variegated diet but preys extensively on ants.

== Reproduction ==
The male frog perches above the leaf litter and calls to the female frogs. The female frogs lays their eggs in forest leaf litter. After the eggs hatch, the adults carry the young to water.

== Taxonomy ==
This species was treated in genus Epipedobates until phylogenetic analysis justified its transfer to Allobates.

== Threats ==
The IUCN classifies this frog as least concern of extinction. In places, it is threatened by habitat loss and deforestation in favor of agriculture, livestock cultivation, and the construction of roads for oil extraction. Pollution from farms, livestock, and mining can also affect this frog.
