= Allobates masniger =

Conservation status
- Least Concern (IUCN 3.1)

Scientific classification
- Kingdom: Animalia
- Phylum: Chordata
- Class: Amphibia
- Order: Anura
- Family: Aromobatidae
- Genus: Allobates
- Species: A. masniger

Binomial name
- Allobates masniger (Morales, 2002)

Synonyms
- Colostethus masniger Morales, 2002

Species of frog

Allobates masniger is a species of frog in the family Aromobatidae. It is endemic to Brazil.

== Habitat ==
This frog lives in the Amazon biome, where it has been found in both primary and secondary rainforests. It seems to have some tolerance to habitat disruption. Scientists have seen the frog 100 meters above sea level.

This frog has been observed in many protected parks, including Parque Nacional da Amazônia and Floresta Nacional de Pau-Rosa.

== Reproduction ==
The female frog lays eggs on land. After the eggs hatch, the adult frogs carry the tadpoles to water.

== Threats ==
The IUCN classifies this frog as least concern of extinction. Its principal threats are fires and logging.

== Original description ==
- Morales, V.R. (2000). "Sistematica y Biogeografia del Grupotrilineatus (Amphibia, Anura, Dendrobatidae, Colostethus), con Descripcion de Once Nuevas Especies". Publicaciones de la Asociacion Amigos de Donana: 1–59.
