= Allobates peruvianus =

Conservation status
- Data Deficient (IUCN 3.1)

Scientific classification
- Kingdom: Animalia
- Phylum: Chordata
- Class: Amphibia
- Order: Anura
- Family: Aromobatidae
- Genus: Allobates
- Species: A. peruvianus

Binomial name
- Allobates peruvianus (Melin, 1941)

Synonyms
- Phyllobates peruvianus Melin, 1941; Colostethus peruvianus (Melin, 1941); Hyloxalus peruvianus (Melin, 1941)

Species of frog

Allobates peruvianus is a species of frog in the family Aromobatidae. It is found in Peru where it occurs on the lower Amazonian slopes of the Andes; its range possibly extends into adjacent Bolivia and Ecuador.

== Habitat ==
Its natural habitats are lowland and premontane forests. It has been observed between 400 and 1500 meters above sea level.

== Reproduction ==
The female frog lays eggs on the ground. After the eggs hatch, the adult frogs carry the tadpoles to temporary pools of water.

== Threats ==
The IUCN classifies this frog as data deficient. Scientists infer that it is threatened by habitat loss associated with agriculture and logging.
