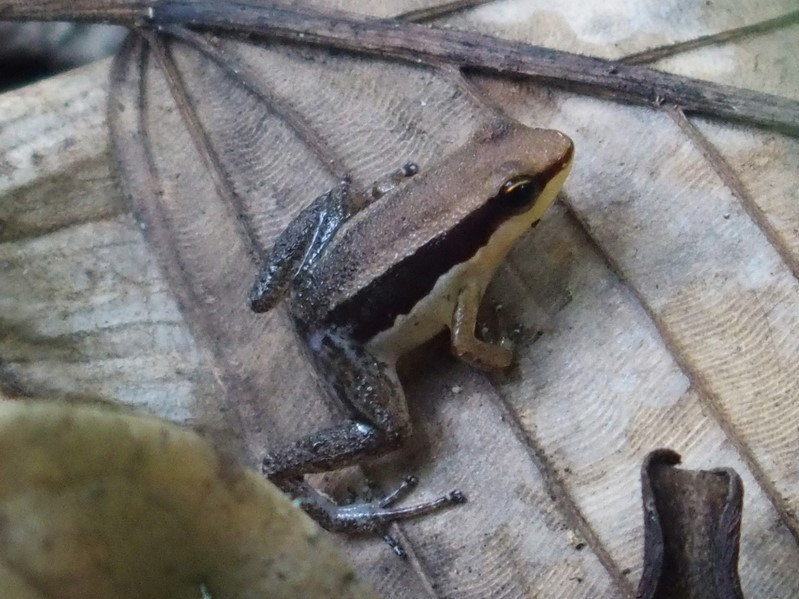

Conservation status
- Least Concern (IUCN 3.1)

Scientific classification
- Kingdom: Animalia
- Phylum: Chordata
- Class: Amphibia
- Order: Anura
- Family: Aromobatidae
- Genus: Allobates
- Species: A. conspicuus

Binomial name
- Allobates conspicuus (Morales, 2002)

Synonyms
- Colostethus conspicuus Morales, 2002

= Allobates conspicuus =

Species of frog

Allobates conspicuus is a species of frog in the family Aromobatidae. It is native to western Brazil and eastern Peru.

== Home ==
This diurnal frog has been found in bamboo and other forests. Some individuals have been spotted in disturbed habitats, such as regenerating forest. Scientists have seen this frog between 250 and 550 meters above sea level.

Scientists have observed the frog within Manu National Park in Peru. They believe it may also live in Parque Nacional da Serra do Divisor in Brazil.

== Reproduction ==
Scientists infer that the tadpoles swim in streams like other tadpoles in Allobates do.

== Threats ==
The IUCN classifies this frog as least concern of extinction. What threat it faces comes from both corporate and small farms and from logging.

== Original description ==
- Morales, V.R. (2000). "Sistematica y Biogeografia del Grupotrilineatus (Amphibia, Anura, Dendrobatidae, Colostethus), con Descripcion de Once Nuevas Especies". Publicaciones de la Asociacion Amigos de Donana (in Spanish): 1–59.
