= Allobates ranoides =

Conservation status
- Critically Endangered (IUCN 3.1)

Scientific classification
- Kingdom: Animalia
- Phylum: Chordata
- Class: Amphibia
- Order: Anura
- Family: Aromobatidae
- Genus: Allobates
- Species: A. ranoides

Binomial name
- Allobates ranoides (Boulenger, 1918)

Synonyms
- Dendrobates ranoides Boulenger, 1918; Colostethus ranoides (Boulenger, 1918)

Species of frog

The llanos rocket frog (Allobates ranoides) is a species of frog in the family Aromobatidae. It is endemic to Colombia.

== Habitat ==
This diurnal, terrestrial frog lives in forests. It has been observed between 100 and 400 meters above sea level.

No official surveys have reported this frog in any protected areas. However, scientists suspect that it maylive in Reserva Forestal Protectora Nacional Cerro Vanguardia, Reserva Forestal Protectora Nacional Caño Vanguardia, or both.

== Reproduction ==
The female frog lays her eggs on the leaf litter. After the eggs hatch, the adult frog carries the tadpoles to water.

== Threats ==
The IUCN classifies this frog as critically endangered and estimates its current population in the wild as 0–49 mature individuals. Its principal threats are habitat loss associated with agriculture, livestock grazing, and human habitation. It experienced a precipitous population decline circa 2001, which is consistent with amphibian declines related to the fungal disease chytridiomycosis.

For a time, the American bullfrog was believed to be a threat to this frog, but this seems to have been an error. The American bullfrog was never present in Allobates ranoidea's habitat.
