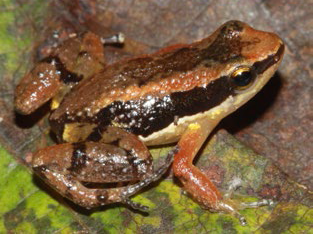

Conservation status
- Near Threatened (IUCN 3.1)

Scientific classification
- Kingdom: Animalia
- Phylum: Chordata
- Class: Amphibia
- Order: Anura
- Family: Aromobatidae
- Genus: Allobates
- Species: A. goianus

Binomial name
- Allobates goianus (Bokermann, 1975)

Synonyms
- Colostethus goianus Bokermann, 1975

= Allobates goianus =

Species of frog

Allobates goianus, also known as Goias rocket frog and Cerrado rocket frog, is a species of frog in the family Aromobatidae. It is endemic to Goiás state, Brazil.

== Habitat ==
The frog has been observed at elevations between 700 and 1,700 m (2,300 and 5,600 ft) above sea level in the leaf litter of humid deciduous forests and deciduous gallery forests near streams or small permanent or seasonal ponds.

== Reproduction ==
The eggs are laid on land. The tadpoles are then carried by the parents to streams where the larval development is completed.

The frog has been directly observed in protected parks, such as Floresta Nacional de Silvania, which is small, Parque Nacional da Chapada dos Veadeiros, RPPN Reserva Natural Serra do Tombador, and Área de Preservação Ambiental Pouso Alto. However, it has since disappeared from the Floresta Nacional de Silvania.

== Threats ==
The IUCN classifies this frog as near threatened. The principal issues are habitat loss in the form of deforestation associated with fires, livestock grazing, dam construction, and urban and rural development, and agricultural activities, including sericulture and soybean farms.
