= Allobates niputidea =

Conservation status
- Least Concern (IUCN 3.1)

Scientific classification
- Kingdom: Animalia
- Phylum: Chordata
- Class: Amphibia
- Order: Anura
- Family: Aromobatidae
- Genus: Allobates
- Species: A. niputidea

Binomial name
- Allobates niputidea Grant, Acosta-Galvis, and Rada, 2007

Species of frog

Allobates niputidea is a frog in the family Aromobatidae. It is endemic to Colombia.

== Habitat ==
This diurnal frog lives in forests where the trees do not exceed 20 meters in height. These frogs have been observed no more than 9 meters from permanent streams in these forests, always between 50 and 970 meters above sea level. This frog does not tolerate habitat disturbance well.

Scientists have seen the frog in some protected areas: Embalse Topocoro private reserve from ISAGEN, Pauxi Pauxi ProAves Reserve, and Cabildo Verde Reserve.

== Reproduction ==
The adult male perches on the leaf litter and calls to the female frogs. The frog reproduces through larval development, with a free-swimming tadpole stage. Young frogs have been observed near pools of water.

== Threats ==
The IUCN classifies this frog as least concern of extinction. What threat it faces comes from conversion of its habitat to spaces for livestock cultivation and agriculture, including both large cacao plantations and small subsistence farms that grow cacao, avocadoes, and bananas. Because these small farms use traditional agroforestry practices that do not involve agrochemicals, scientists do not consider them a threat.

== Original publication ==
- Grant T; Acosta A; Rada M (2007). "A name for the species of Allobates (Anura: Dendrobatoidea:Aromobatidae) from the Magdalena Valley of Colombia". Copeia (Abstract and preview). 2007: 844–854.

The name Niputidea comes from Spanish "ni puta idea" ("no fucking idea") as the researchers who found it did not know how to classify it.
