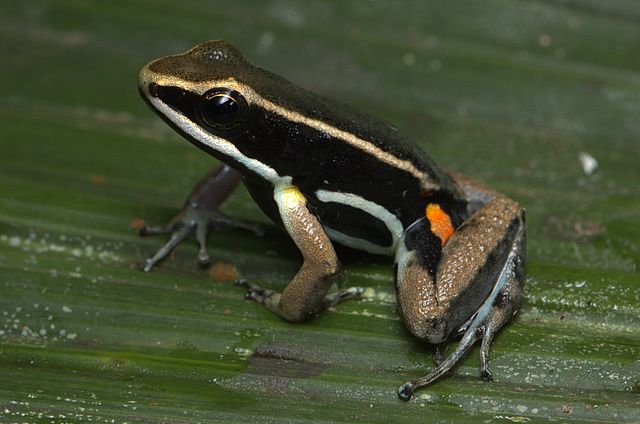
- Brilliant-thighed poison frog (Allobates femoralis)

Scientific classification
- Kingdom: Animalia
- Phylum: Chordata
- Class: Amphibia
- Order: Anura
- Family: Aromobatidae
- Subfamily: Allobatinae
- Genus: Allobates; Zimmermann and Zimmermann, 1988

Species
- 58, see text

= Allobates =

Genus of amphibians

Allobates is a genus of frogs in the family Aromobatidae. They are native to the Central and South Americas, from Nicaragua to Bolivia and Brazil, with one species on Martinique.

== Description and ecology ==
Species of the genus Allobates are mostly small frogs. Dorsal colouration is cryptic, with the exception of the Allobates femoralis group that has bright colours. They are mostly terrestrial frogs found in the leaf litter of tropical rain forests. Most species deposit eggs in the leaf litter; tadpoles are transported to the water on the backs of the parents. Allobates nidicola and Allobates chalcopis, however, have endotrophic tadpoles that develop into froglets in the nest, without entering water.

== Taxonomy ==
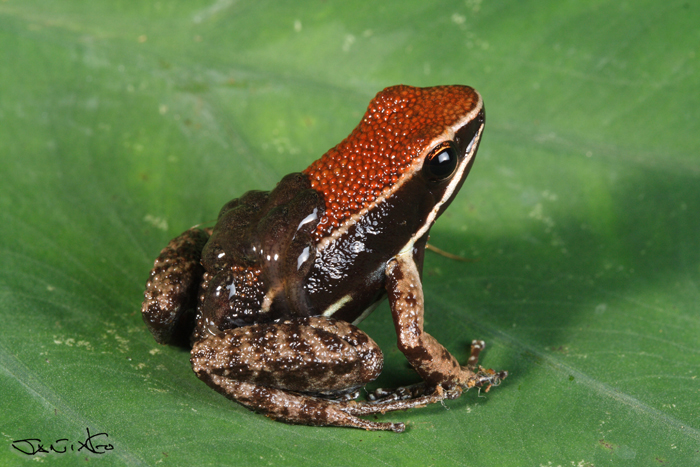
Allobates zaparo

There are many species recognised in the genus Allobates:

- Allobates algorei Barrio-Amorós and Santos, 2009
- Allobates amissibilis Kok, Hölting, and Ernst, 2013
- Allobates bacurau Simões, 2016
- Allobates bromelicola (Test, 1956)
- Allobates brunneus (Cope, 1887)
- Allobates caeruleodactylus (Lima and Caldwell, 2001)
- Allobates caldwellae Lima, Ferrão, and Silva, 2020
- Allobates carajas Simões, Rojas, and Lima, 2019
- Allobates caribe (Barrio-Amorós, Rivas-Fuenmayor, and Kaiser, 2006)
- Allobates chalcopis (Kaiser, Coloma, and Gray, 1994)
- Allobates conspicuus (Morales, 2002)
- Allobates crombiei (Morales, 2002)
- Allobates femoralis (Boulenger, 1884)
- Allobates flaviventris Melo-Sampaio, Souza, and Peloso, 2013
- Allobates fratisenescus (Morales, 2002)
- Allobates fuscellus (Morales, 2002)
- Allobates gasconi (Morales, 2002)
- Allobates goianus (Bokermann, 1975)
- Allobates granti (Kok, MacCulloch, Gaucher, Poelman, Bourne, Lathrop, and Lenglet, 2006)
- Allobates grillicantus Moraes and Lima, 2021
- Allobates grillisimilis Simões, Sturaro, Peloso, and Lima, 2013
- Allobates hodli Simões, Lima, and Farias, 2010
- Allobates humilis (Rivero, 1980)
- Allobates ignotus Anganoy-Criollo, 2012
- Allobates insperatus (Morales, 2002)
- Allobates juami Simões, Gagliardi-Urrutia, Rojas-Runjaic, and Castroviejo-Fisher, 2018
- Allobates juanii (Morales, 1994)
- Allobates kingsburyi (Boulenger, 1918)
- Allobates liniaureum Jaramillo-Martinez, Vilà, Guayasamin, Gagliardi-Urrutia, Rojas-Runjaic, Simões, Chaparro, Aguilar-Manihuari & Castroviejo-Fisher, 2025
- Allobates magnussoni Lima, Simões, and Kaefer, 2014
- Allobates mandelorum (Schmidt, 1932)
- Allobates marchesianus (Melin, 1941)
- Allobates masniger (Morales, 2002)
- Allobates mcdiarmidi (Reynolds and Foster, 1992)
- Allobates melanolaemus (Grant and Rodriguez, 2001)
- Allobates myersi (Pyburn, 1981)
- Allobates nidicola (Caldwell and Lima, 2003)
- Allobates niputidea Grant, Acosta-Galvis, and Rada, 2007
- Allobates nunciatus Moraes, Pavan, and Lima, 2019
- Allobates ornatus (Morales, 2002)
- Allobates pacaas Melo-Sampaio, Prates, Peloso, Recoder, Vechio, Marques-Souza, and Rodrigues, 2020
- Allobates paleovarzensis Lima, Caldwell, Biavati, and Montanarin, 2010
- Allobates peruvianus (Melin, 1941)
- Allobates pittieri (La Marca, Manzanilla, and Mijares-Urrutia, 2004)
- Allobates ranoides (Boulenger, 1918)
- Allobates ripicolus Fouquet, Ferrão, and Jairam, 2023
- Allobates sanmartini (Rivero, Langone, and Prigioni, 1986)
- Allobates sieggreenae Gagliardi-Urrutia, Castroviejo-Fisher, Rojas-Runjaic, Jaramillo-Martinez, Solís, and Simões, 2021
- Allobates subfolionidificans (Lima, Sanchez, and Souza, 2007)
- Allobates sumtuosus (Morales, 2002)
- Allobates talamancae (Cope, 1875)
- Allobates tapajos Lima, Simões, and Kaefer, 2015
- Allobates tinae Melo-Sampaio, Oliveira, and Prates, 2018
- Allobates trilineatus (Boulenger, 1884)
- Allobates undulatus (Myers and Donnelly, 2001)
- Allobates vanzolinius (Morales, 2002)
- Allobates velocicantus Souza, Ferrão, Hanken & Lima, 2020
- Allobates wayuu (Acosta-Galvis, Cuentas, and Coloma, 1999)
- Allobates zaparo (Silverstone, 1976)
