= Allobates velocicantus =

Conservation status
- Data Deficient (IUCN 3.1)

Scientific classification
- Kingdom: Animalia
- Phylum: Chordata
- Class: Amphibia
- Order: Anura
- Family: Aromobatidae
- Genus: Allobates
- Species: A. velocicantus

Binomial name
- Allobates velocicantus Souza, Ferrão, Hanken, and Lima, 2020

Species of frog

Allobates velocicantus, the fast singer frog, is a species of frog in the family Aromobatidae. It is endemic to Brazil.

== Habitat ==
Scientists observed the frog in primary and secondary orphophilious forest, near streams. They saw it between 181 and 211 meters above sea level.

The frog lives in one protected place Área De Relevante Interesse Ecológico Japiim Pentecoste.

== Reproduction ==
The female frog lays eggs on the leaves of shrubs. After the eggs hatch, the male frog carries the frogs to pools of water for further development.

== Threats ==
The IUCN classifies this species as data deficient. Although the type locality is a protected area, the frog's face deforestation at both this site and the other place where they were found. Humans cut down trees for logging, agriculture, and cattle husbandry, even in areas where this is illegal.
