= Allobates crombiei =

Conservation status
- Least Concern (IUCN 3.1)

Scientific classification
- Kingdom: Animalia
- Phylum: Chordata
- Class: Amphibia
- Order: Anura
- Family: Aromobatidae
- Genus: Allobates
- Species: A. crombiei

Binomial name
- Allobates crombiei (Morales, 2002)

Synonyms
- Colostethus crombiei Morales, 2002

Species of frog

Allobates crombiei is a species of frog in the family Aromobatidae. It is endemic to the Pará state in Brazil.

== Habitat ==
This frog lives in Amazon rainforests, both primary and secondary. It has shown some tolerance to habitat disturbance.

== Reproduction ==
The female frog lays eggs on land. After the eggs hatch, the adult frogs carry the tadpoles to water.

== Threats ==
The IUCN classifies this frog as least concern of extinction. In some places, it is threatened by fires and by habitat loss in favor of cattle grazing and hydroelectric power, for example the Belo Monte Dam.

== Etymology ==
It is named in honor of Ronald Ian Crombie.

== Original publication ==
- Morales, V.R. (2000). "Sistematica y Biogeografia del Grupotrilineatus (Amphibia, Anura, Dendrobatidae, Colostethus), con Descripcion de Once Nuevas Especies". Publicaciones de la Asociacion Amigos de Donana: 1–59.
