= Allobates juami =

Conservation status
- Least Concern (IUCN 3.1)

Scientific classification
- Kingdom: Animalia
- Phylum: Chordata
- Class: Amphibia
- Order: Anura
- Family: Aromobatidae
- Genus: Allobates
- Species: A. juami

Binomial name
- Allobates juami Lima, Simões, and Kaefer, 2014

Species of frog

Allobates juami is a species of frog in the family Aromobatidae. It is endemic to Brazil.

== Description ==
The adult male frog measures about 17.0 – 18.2 mm in snout-vent length and the adult female frog about 17.5–18.5 mm. Unlike other nurse frogs, the adult male A. juami does not have dark marks on his abdomen. The skin of the dorsum shows cryptic coloration, mostly dark brown. The snout is light brown in color with a lighter mark. The abdomen is yellow in color with an iridescent white stripe on the side. There is some sexual dimorphism in the color of the throat. The adult female frog has a yellow throat and the male frog can have a clear or pink one. There is a light mark near the cloacal area. The scutes on the toes can be white or black in color. The iris of the eye is dark in color with a gold ring around the pupil.

== Habitat ==
This frog lives in dense, closed-canopy forests. The frogs live on the leaf litter in areas in which the soil beneath has considerable amounts of white sand. Scientists saw this frog 87 meters above sea level.

Scientists have seen this frog exclusively in Estação Ecológica Juami-Japurá, which is a protected area.

== Reproduction ==
The male frog perches on a fallen branch approximately 10 cm above the ground and calls to the female frogs. Scientists infer that the female frog lays eggs on land and, after the eggs hatch, the adult frogs carry the frogs to water.

== Threats ==
The IUCN classifies this frog as least concern of extinction and cites no specific threats. The frog was found in a remote part of Brazil with no known human populations.

== Original description ==
- Simões PI; Gagliardi-Urrutia G; Rojas-Runjac FJM; Castroviejo-Fisher S (2018). "A new species of nurse-frog (Aromobatide, Allobates) from the Juami River basin, northwestern Brazilian Amazonia". Zootaxa. 4387: 109–133.
