= Allobates flaviventris =

Conservation status
- Least Concern (IUCN 3.1)

Scientific classification
- Kingdom: Animalia
- Phylum: Chordata
- Class: Amphibia
- Order: Anura
- Family: Aromobatidae
- Genus: Allobates
- Species: A. flaviventris

Binomial name
- Allobates flaviventris Simões, Sturaro, Peloso, and Lima, 2013

Species of frog

Allobates flaviventris, the yellow-bellied stream frog, is a species of frog in the family Aromobatidae. It is endemic to Brazil and Bolivia.

== Description ==
The adult male frog is 16.7 to 19.7 mm long from nose to rear end and the adult frog is 9.3–21.1 mm long. The skin of the frog's back can be light gray, gray-brown, or cream-brown in color. These frogs have brown hourglass marks reaching from the orbital area down the back. The upper surfaces of the front legs are cream-tan in color. Those of the hind legs are light brown with dark brown bands going across. The adult males have purple-gray throats with dark marks on the vocal sac. The chest and belly are gold-yellow in color. The adult female frog has yellow color in the center of her throat and on her chest. Her belly is yellow, gold-yellow, or cream-yellow in color. There is more gold color high on the hind legs and near where the forelegs meet the body. There is a light gray or brown lateral stripe. Some frogs have a band across the body from the eye to the groin, with white spots. The iris of the eye is bronze in the middle with gold at the edges and black reticulations. The pupil of the eye is all black.

== Habitat ==
This frog lives near streams in forests containing bamboo. Scientists observed the frog 150 meters above sea level.

The frog has been reported in at least one protected park: Parque Nacional de Pacaás Novos.

== Reproduction ==
Breeding takes place throughout the rainy season. The male frog perches on the leaf litter and calls. The female frogs lay eggs on land. After the eggs hatch, the male frog carries the tadpoles to streams, where they develop.

== Threats ==
The IUCN classifies this frog as least concern of extinction. Possible threats include habitat loss from agriculture, logging, and intentional fires.

== Original description ==
- Melo-Sampaio PR; De Souza MB; Peloso PLV (2013). "A new, riparian species of Allobates Zimmermann and Zimmermann, 1988 (Anura: Aromobatidae) from southwestern Amazonia". Zootaxa. 3716: 336–348.
