= Allobates bacurau =

Conservation status
- Data Deficient (IUCN 3.1)

Scientific classification
- Kingdom: Animalia
- Phylum: Chordata
- Class: Amphibia
- Order: Anura
- Family: Aromobatidae
- Genus: Allobates
- Species: A. bacurau

Binomial name
- Allobates bacurau Lima, Simões, and Kaefer, 2014

Species of frog

Allobates bacurau is a species of frog in the family Aromobatidae. It is endemic to Brazil.

== Description ==
The adult male frog measures about 14.0–14.7 mm in snout-vent length and the adult female frog about 14.7–14.9 mm. The skin of the ventral areas is light gray to white in color. Both male and female adult frogs have dark gray throats.

== Habitat ==
This diurnal, terrestrial frog has been found in small forest fragments. Although it has been observed near farms, scientists do not know its tolerance to habitat disturbance.

Scientists have not observed the frog inside any protected parks but it has been found near Parque Nacional do Juruena.

== Reproduction ==
Scientists do not know much about this frog's reproductive cycle. They infer that, like other frogs in Allobates, the female lays the eggs on land and, after hatching, the adult frogs carry the tadpoles to water for further development.

== Threats ==
The IUCN classifies this frog as data deficient with respect to risk of extinction.
