= Allobates vanzolinius =

Conservation status
- Least Concern (IUCN 3.1)

Scientific classification
- Kingdom: Animalia
- Phylum: Chordata
- Class: Amphibia
- Order: Anura
- Family: Aromobatidae
- Genus: Allobates
- Species: A. vanzolinius

Binomial name
- Allobates vanzolinius (Morales, 2002)

Synonyms
- Colostethus vanzolinius Morales, 2002

Species of amphibian

Allobates vanzolinius also known as Vanzolini's rocket frog, is a species of frog in the family Aromobatidae. It is endemic to the Amazonas state, Brazil.

== Etymology ==
The specific name vanzolinius honors Paulo Vanzolini, a Brazilian herpetologist and composer.

== Habitat ==
This frog is endemic to Amazonas, where it is found in lowland forests, both primary and secondary, indicating that it can tolerate some amount of habitat disturbance.

The frog's known range overlaps many protected parks. It has been formally reported within Reserva Extrativista do Baixo Juruá.

== Reproduction ==
The female frog lays eggs on land. After the eggs hatch, the adults carry the tadpoles to water for further development.

== Threats ==
The IUCN classifies this frog as least concern of extinction. What threat it faces comes from habitat loss associated with fires and clear-cutting.
