= Allobates brunneus =

Conservation status
- Endangered (IUCN 3.1)

Scientific classification
- Kingdom: Animalia
- Phylum: Chordata
- Class: Amphibia
- Order: Anura
- Family: Aromobatidae
- Genus: Allobates
- Species: A. brunneus

Binomial name
- Allobates brunneus (Cope, 1887)

Synonyms
- Colostethus brunneus (Cope, 1887)

Species of frog

Allobates brunneus (common name: Chupada rocket frog) is a species of frog in the family Aromobatidae. It is found in the southern Amazon drainage in Brazil to Mato Grosso and Amazonas and into extreme northern Bolivia. It has been often confused with other species, including undescribed ones.

== Description ==
The adult male frog measures 14.8–18.3 mm in snout-vent length and the adult female frog 15.8–19.8 mm. The skin of the dorsum can be light gray or orange-brown in color. Individuals may have one or more markings in the shape of an hourglass, diamond, or triangle. The tops of the front legs are orange-brown in color. The tops of the hind legs are gray in color. There are dark stripes on the legs. The male frog has a yellow-green throat and yellow chest and belly with dark spots. The female frog has a white throat with only some yellow color and a white chest and belly. There is a light brown or orange brown stripe down each side of the body. There is a white stripe from the eye to the groin. Part of the iris of the eye is gold in color with black reticulations. The rest of the iris of the eye is brown in color.

== Habitat ==
In Brazil, this frog lives in Buritizais microhabitats within Cerrado swamps. In other places, the frog has been observed near lakes and pools of stagnant water in rainforests. Scientists observed the frog between 140 and 380 meters above sea level.

This frog's known range includes at least two protected parks, Parque Nacional Chapada dos Guimarães and Area de Proteção Ambiental (APA) da Chapada dos Guimarães. Scientists think it may also live in Area de Proteção Ambiental Municipal Aricá-açu.

== Reproduction ==
The female frog usually lays her eggs on living leaves in the understory but may lay them on curled leaves on the ground. After the eggs hatch, the adult frog carries the tadpoles to water.

The tadpoles are gray-brown in color with brown and silver marks.

== Threats ==
The IUCN classifies this frog as endangered. The principal threats are habitat loss from fires, agriculture (particularly soybean plantations), livestock cultivation, and illegal logging for charcoal production. The site from which the frog was first described was flooded for the Manso Hydroelectrical Plant human-made lake. In some parts of its range, urbanization is also an issue.
