= Allobates paleovarzensis =

Conservation status
- Least Concern (IUCN 3.1)

Scientific classification
- Kingdom: Animalia
- Phylum: Chordata
- Class: Amphibia
- Order: Anura
- Family: Aromobatidae
- Genus: Allobates
- Species: A. paleovarzensis

Binomial name
- Allobates paleovarzensis Lima, Caldwell, Biavati, and Montanarin, 2010

Species of frog

Allobates paleovarzensis, the Amazonian nurse frog, is a species of frog in the family Aromobatidae. It is endemic to Brazil and Colombia.

== Description ==
The adult male frog measures 18.27 – 22.42 mm in snout-vent length and the adult female frog 18.67 – 21.57 mm. The male frog has a longer head than the female frog. The frog's coloration is cryptic and suited to its lowland forest habitat. The skin of the dorsum is light brown in color, darkest on the head. There are tan dorsolateral stripes. The hind legs are light brown in color with dark brown granules. Some frogs have thin, dark brown stripes on the tibial portion of the back legs and on the back feet. The adult female frog has a yellow throat, chest, and belly. Adult male frogs have a gray-purple throat, a light chest, and melanophores on the vocal sac. Adult frogs have a narrow white stripes that extend from the face to the groin.

== Diet ==
The adult frogs eat insects. The tadpoles eat plant matter and dead insects. As they become older, tadpoles become increasingly carnivorous.

== Etymology ==
Scientists named this frog paleovarzensis for the specific paleovárzea habitat in which it lives. The paleovárzeas were once flood plains of the Amazon River, but the tributaries that flow through them now do not flood.

== Habitat ==
This frog lives in the leaf litter in old-growth rainforests, exclusively in paleovárzea habitats. The streams in the paleovarzeas have more nutrients than other streams. Scientists observed the frog between 40 and 80 meters above sea level.

The frog's range includes at least protected places, Rio Negro Right Bank Environmental Protection Area and the Central Amazon Conservation Complex World Heritage Site.

== Reproduction ==
The male frog perches on a leaf and calls. He has an advertisement call and another call to attract females. The frogs have been heard calling in the morning and at dusk from October to June. Male frogs are territorial, with larger territories associated with more access to females and more mating success. The female frog lays her eggs on dead leaves, about 29 per clutch. The male frog cares for the eggs, which take about 21 days to hatch. The male frog then carries the tadpoles to pools of water in streams. Scientists observed male frogs carrying as many as 60 tadpoles at the same time, this greatest number for any frog in Allobates. After the male frog moves the tadpoles, he leaves the territory. The tadpoles take 88 days to develop, sometimes longer.

The tadpoles are yellow-brown in color with dark brown flecks on their backs, sides, and tails. They have clear bellies. They have a dark brown bar extending from the nose over the eye to the middle of the body.

== Threats ==
The IUCN classifies this frog as least concern of extinction. In one place, near Manaus, it is subject to deforestation in favor of roads and urbanization. In other places, mining and logging are some issue.

== Original publication ==
- Lima AP; Caldwell JP; Biavai G; Montanarin A (2010). "A new species of Allobates (Anura: Aromobatidae) from Paleovarzea forest in Amazonas, Brazil". Zootaxa. 2337: 1–17.
