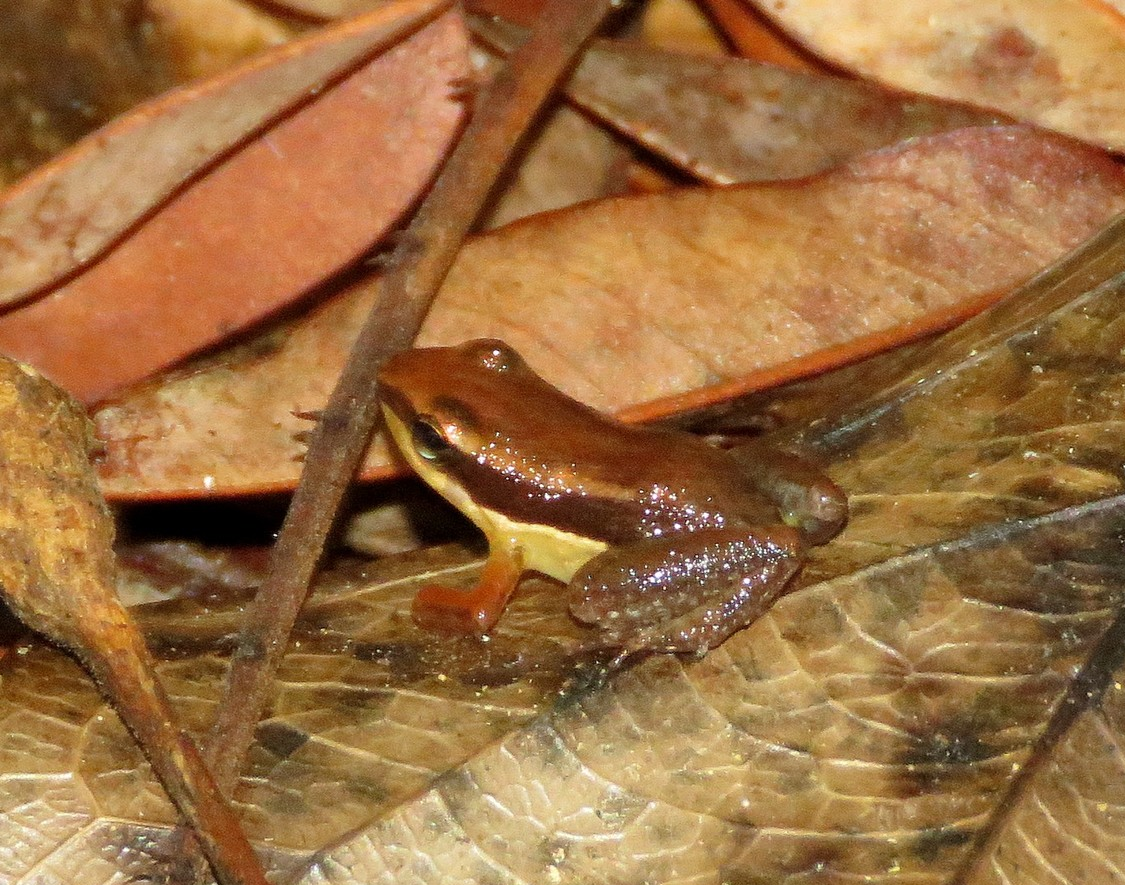

Scientific classification
- Kingdom: Animalia
- Phylum: Chordata
- Class: Amphibia
- Order: Anura
- Family: Aromobatidae
- Genus: Allobates
- Species: A. grillicantus

Binomial name
- Allobates grillicantus Moraes and Lima, 2021

= Allobates grillicantus =

Species of frog

Allobates grillicantus is a frog in the family Aromobatidae. It is endemic to Brazil.

== Habitat ==
Scientists have reported this frog from exactly two places, but they infer it probably lives other parts of the Tapajós-Xingu interfluvial region. This frog spends its time on the leaf litter in forests that do not flood. Scientists have not reported it from any open or human-opened habitats.

== Description ==
The adult male frog measures 15.2–16.8 mm in snout-vent length and the adult female frog 16.5–17.7 mm. The skin of the dorsum is tan to red-brown in color. There is a dark brown ventrilateral stripe and a white dorsolateral stripe. The forelegs are tan-brown and the hind legs are gray-brown. The belly is yellow and the throat is light yellow.

== Etymology ==
Scientists named this frog grillicantus, which is Latin for "cricket song." The scientists named this frog for its cricket-like advertisement call.

== Reproduction ==
The female frog lays eggs in a gel nest near old or fresh fallen leaves. After the eggs hatch, the male frog carries the tadpoles to puddles or other water.

The tadpoles' bodies are longer than they are wide. There is a pattern on the tail.
