= Allobates grillisimilis =

Conservation status
- Least Concern (IUCN 3.1)

Scientific classification
- Kingdom: Animalia
- Phylum: Chordata
- Class: Amphibia
- Order: Anura
- Family: Aromobatidae
- Genus: Allobates
- Species: A. grillisimilis

Binomial name
- Allobates grillisimilis Simões, Sturaro, Peloso, and Lima, 2013

Species of frog

Allobates grillisimilis is a frog in the family Aromobatidae. It is endemic to Brazil.

== Description ==
The adult male frog measures 13.9 ± 0.8 mm in snout-vent length and the adult frog 14.4 ± 0.8 mm. There is no readily visible sexual dimorphism. The skin of the dorsum is tan-brown in color with darker brown on the sides. Some individuals have spots. The male frog's vocal sac appears white or clear when he uses it to call, and it can have brown flecks. Most frogs have diffuse stripes on the sides of their bodies. The dorsal surfaces of the front legs are brown in color and white where they meet the body. The ventral surfaces of the front legs are white or clear. The hind legs are dark brown in color with white marks near the cloacal area. There are white scutes on the toes of all four feet. The iris of the eye is gold in color with black marks and a ring around the pupil.

== Habitat ==
This frog lives in terra firma forests.

The frog's known range overlaps with some protected parks in it, for example Floresta Nacional Pau-Rosa.

== Reproduction ==
The male frog sits on branches or logs just over the ground and calls to the female frogs. The female frog lays eggs on land, usually on dead leaves, curled or flat. Scientists reported seeing are 6–13 eggs per clutch. Scientists have seen the male frogs carrying tadpoles on their backs, so they inferred parental care and that the male frogs carry the tadpoles to streams.

The tadpoles are partially translucent. The blood vessels and internal organs are visible through the skin with the naked eye. Their bodies have small gold spots. The middle of the body can be red or pink in color.

== Threats ==
The IUCN classifies this frog as least concern of extinction.

== Original description ==
- Simoes PI; Sturaro MJ; Peloso PLV; Lima AP (2013). "A new diminutive species of Allobates Zimmermann and Zimmermann, 1988 (Anura, Aromabatidae) from the northwestern Rio Madeira - Rio Tapajos interfluve, Amazonas, Brazil". Zootaxa. 3609: 251–273.
