= Allobates juanii =

Conservation status
- Endangered (IUCN 3.1)

Scientific classification
- Kingdom: Animalia
- Phylum: Chordata
- Class: Amphibia
- Order: Anura
- Family: Aromobatidae
- Genus: Allobates
- Species: A. juanii

Binomial name
- Allobates juanii (Morales, 1994)

Synonyms
- Colostethus juanii Morales, 1994

Species of frog

Allobates juanii is a species of frog in the family Aromobatidae. It is endemic to Colombia where it is only known from its type locality, a botanical garden in the city of Villavicencio, on the lower slopes of the eastern side of the Cordillera Oriental.

== Habitat ==
This diurnal, terrestrial frog has been observed in small patches of forest and in gardens but not in large swaths of forest. Scientists believe it is restricted to habitats near fast-flowing streams. It has been observed between 313 and 850 meters above sea level.

While the frog has not been formally reported in any protected area, several parks overlap its known range: Reserva Forestal Protectora Nacional Caño Vanguardia, Reserva Forestal Protectora Nacional Cerro Vanguardia, Reserva Forestal Protectora Nacional Quebrada Honda y Caños Parrado y Buque Parque Ecologico Humedal Zuria, and Parque Ecologico Humedal Caracoli.

== Reproduction ==
The female frog deposits eggs on the leaf litter. Scientists believe the male frog provides parental care and, after the eggs hatch, carries the tadpoles to small streams.

== Threats ==
Allobates juanii is assesed as endangered on the IUCN Red List of threatened species because of habitat fragmentation and loss. It also faces some threat from water pollution.
