= Allobates fuscellus =

Conservation status
- Least Concern (IUCN 3.1)

Scientific classification
- Kingdom: Animalia
- Phylum: Chordata
- Class: Amphibia
- Order: Anura
- Family: Aromobatidae
- Genus: Allobates
- Species: A. fuscellus

Binomial name
- Allobates fuscellus (Morales, 2002)

Synonyms
- Colostethus fuscellus Morales, 2002

Species of frog

Allobates fuscellus is a species of frog in the family Aromobatidae. It is found in the Amazon Basin in western Brazil and possibly also Peru.

== Habitat ==
Its natural habitats are tropical lowland primary and secondary rainforest. This frog has been observed between 65 and 250 meters above sea level.

== Reproduction ==
The female frog lays eggs on land. After they hatch, the adult frogs carry the tadpoles to streams, where they develop further.

== Threats ==
The IUCN classifies this frog as least concern of extinction while noting that clear-cut logging may pose some threat in some parts of its range.

== Original description ==
- Morales, V.R. (2000). "Sistematica y Biogeografia del Grupotrilineatus (Amphibia, Anura, Dendrobatidae, Colostethus), con Descripcion de Once Nuevas Especies". Publicaciones de la Asociacion Amigos de Donana: 1–59.
