= Allobates myersi =

Conservation status
- Least Concern (IUCN 3.1)
- CITES Appendix II

Scientific classification
- Kingdom: Animalia
- Phylum: Chordata
- Class: Amphibia
- Order: Anura
- Family: Aromobatidae
- Genus: Allobates
- Species: A. myersi

Binomial name
- Allobates myersi (Pyburn, 1981)

Synonyms
- Dendrobates myersi Pyburn, 1981; Epipedobates myersi Myers, 1987; Ameerega myersi Frost, Grant, Faivovich, Bain, Haas, Haddad, de Sá, Channing, Wilkinson, Donnellan, Raxworthy, Campbell, Blotto, Moler, Drewes, Nussbaum, Lynch, Green, and Wheeler, 2006; Allobates myersi Grant, Frost, Caldwell, Gagliardo, Haddad, Kok, Means, Noonan, Schargel, and Wheeler, 2006

Species of frog

Allobates myersi (common name: Myers' poison frog) is a species of frog in the family Aromobatidae found in Amazonian Colombia, likely also in adjacent Brazil and northeastern Peru.

== Description ==
The adult male frog measures about 28 mm in snout-vent length and the adult female frog about 33 mm. The frog is light brown or medium brown in color with darker brown granules. The chest is blue-gray or dark brown in color. The abdomen is white in color. The sides of the head and body are blue-black in color. There is a light stripe from the nose over the mouth to the groin. The stripe is cream-white near the nose and yellow near the other end. There is yellow color in the axilla and groin. Parts of the hind legs are red in color. The iris of the eye is gold in color with black reticulations.

== Habitat ==
Its natural habitat is tropical moist lowland forest. It is terrestrial and diurnal. Scientists observed the frog between 100 and 260 meters above sea level.

The frog has been found in some protected parks, specifically Parque National Natural Río Pure and Parque National Natural Yaigoje Apaporis.

== Reproduction ==
The female frog lays her eggs on the leaf litter. Scientists believe the male frog provides parental care by guarding the eggs and carrying the tadpoles to streams.

== Threats ==
The IUCN classifies this frog as least concern of extinction. It does face some threat in the southern parts of its range from habitat loss in favor of increased cattle cultivation.
