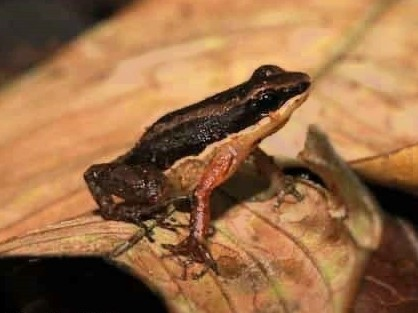

Conservation status
- Vulnerable (IUCN 3.1)

Scientific classification
- Kingdom: Animalia
- Phylum: Chordata
- Class: Amphibia
- Order: Anura
- Family: Aromobatidae
- Genus: Allobates
- Species: A. fratisenescus

Binomial name
- Allobates fratisenescus (Morales, 2000)

Synonyms
- Colostethus fratisenescus Morales, 2000

= Allobates fratisenescus =

Species of frog

Allobates fratisenescus is a species of frog in the family Aromobatidae. It is endemic to Ecuador where it is known from the upper reaches of Pastaza River drainage, on the eastern side of the Cordillera Oriental.

== Description ==
The adult male frog measures 18.7–20.2 mm in snout-vent length and the adult female frog 18.5–21.2 mm. The skin of the dorsum back is coffee-brown in color with a light dorsolinear line and another ventrolateral line. There are other marks on the back.

== Habitat ==
Its natural habitats are tropical rainforest. Scientists have observed the frog between 450 and 1150 meters above sea level.

Scientists have observed the frog in two protected parks: Parque Nacional Sangay and Reserva Biológica El Quimi.

== Etymology ==
Scientists named this frog fratisenescus for the Latin words for "older brother," a reference to its large size relative to other species in its group.

== Reproduction ==
Scientists believe the tadpoles develop in streams.

== Threats ==
The IUCN classifies this frog as vulnerable to extinction. Its principal threats are deforestation in favor of cattle grazing and logging.
