= Allobates nidicola =

Conservation status
- Least Concern (IUCN 3.1)

Scientific classification
- Kingdom: Animalia
- Phylum: Chordata
- Class: Amphibia
- Order: Anura
- Family: Aromobatidae
- Genus: Allobates
- Species: A. nidicola

Binomial name
- Allobates nidicola (Caldwell & Lima, 2003)

Synonyms
- Colostethus nidicola Caldwell & Lima, 2003

Species of frog

Allobates nidicola is a species of frog in the family Aromobatidae. It is endemic to Brazil.

== Habitat ==
This largely terrestrial frog lives in the Amazon biome in flooded igapó forests. It has been observed on the leaf litter and other ground cover. Scientists have seen the frog 50 meters above sea level.

This frog has been observed in many protected parks.

== Reproduction ==
The female frog lays a clutch of two to six eggs on the leaf litter. The tadpoles develop into frogs in the nest.

== Threats ==
The IUCN classifies this frog as least concern of extinction. In some parts of its range, it is in danger from fish-spine clear-cutting in favor of cattle rearing.
