= Allobates marchesianus =

Conservation status
- Least Concern (IUCN 3.1)

Scientific classification
- Kingdom: Animalia
- Phylum: Chordata
- Class: Amphibia
- Order: Anura
- Family: Aromobatidae
- Genus: Allobates
- Species: A. marchesianus

Binomial name
- Allobates marchesianus (Melin, 1941)

Synonyms
- Phyllobates marchesianus Melin, 1941; Colostethus marchesianus (Melin, 1941)

Species of frog

Allobates marchesianus, also known as the dull rocket frog, is a species of frog in the family Aromobatidae. It is found in the Amazon Basin in Brazil, Colombia, Ecuador, Peru, and Venezuela. However, this species might represent a cryptic species complex, where at least the populations from Venezuela belong to an undescribed species.

== Description ==
Adult males measure 15.0–16.6 mm (0.6–0.7 in) and adult females 15.1–17.0 mm (0.6–0.7 in) in snout-vent length. The snout is short, slightly rounded in the dorsal view and acutely rounded in the lateral view. The anteroventral margin of the tympanum is distinct, whereas the posterodorsal margin is obscured by the supratympanic fold. The fingers and toes bear terminal discs. The toes have very weak lateral keels and some basal webbing. The dorsum is reddish brown with small brown granules. The dorsolateral stripe is distinct, light reddish brown. A chocolate-brown band runs from across the snout through the eye and upper tympanum, above arm insertion, and to the groin. Females have yellow throat, chest, and belly, varying in intensity among individuals, and pale yellow blotches on the flanks. Males have light gay belly and gray to dark gray throat and chest; the flanks have white blotches.

Eggs are laid in terrestrial nests guarded by the male. The male or the female transports the tadpoles to a pond or small stream.

== Habitat and conservation ==
Allobates marchesianus occurs in secondary and old-growth tropical rainforests at elevations up to 800 m (2,600 ft) above sea level. It lives on the forest floor. Reproduction takes place in small pools.

It is a common species but its habitat is threatened by clear cutting, logging, forest conversion, and fires. Its range includes several protected areas.
