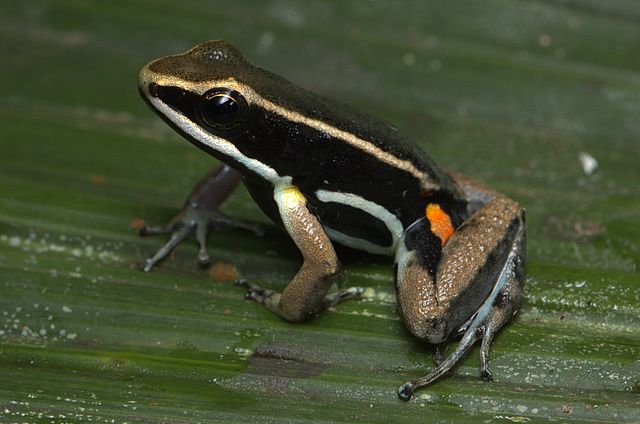

Conservation status
- Least Concern (IUCN 3.1)
- CITES Appendix II

Scientific classification
- Kingdom: Animalia
- Phylum: Chordata
- Class: Amphibia
- Order: Anura
- Family: Aromobatidae
- Genus: Allobates
- Species: A. femoralis

Binomial name
- Allobates femoralis (Boulenger, 1884)
- Distribution map of Allobates femoralis

= Allobates femoralis =

Species of frog

Allobates femoralis (common name brilliant-thighed poison frog, brilliant-thighed poison-arrow frog) is a species of frog in the family Aromobatidae. It is found in Bolivia, Brazil, Colombia, Ecuador, French Guiana, Guyana, Peru, and Suriname. Its natural habitat is tropical lowland forests.

== Description ==
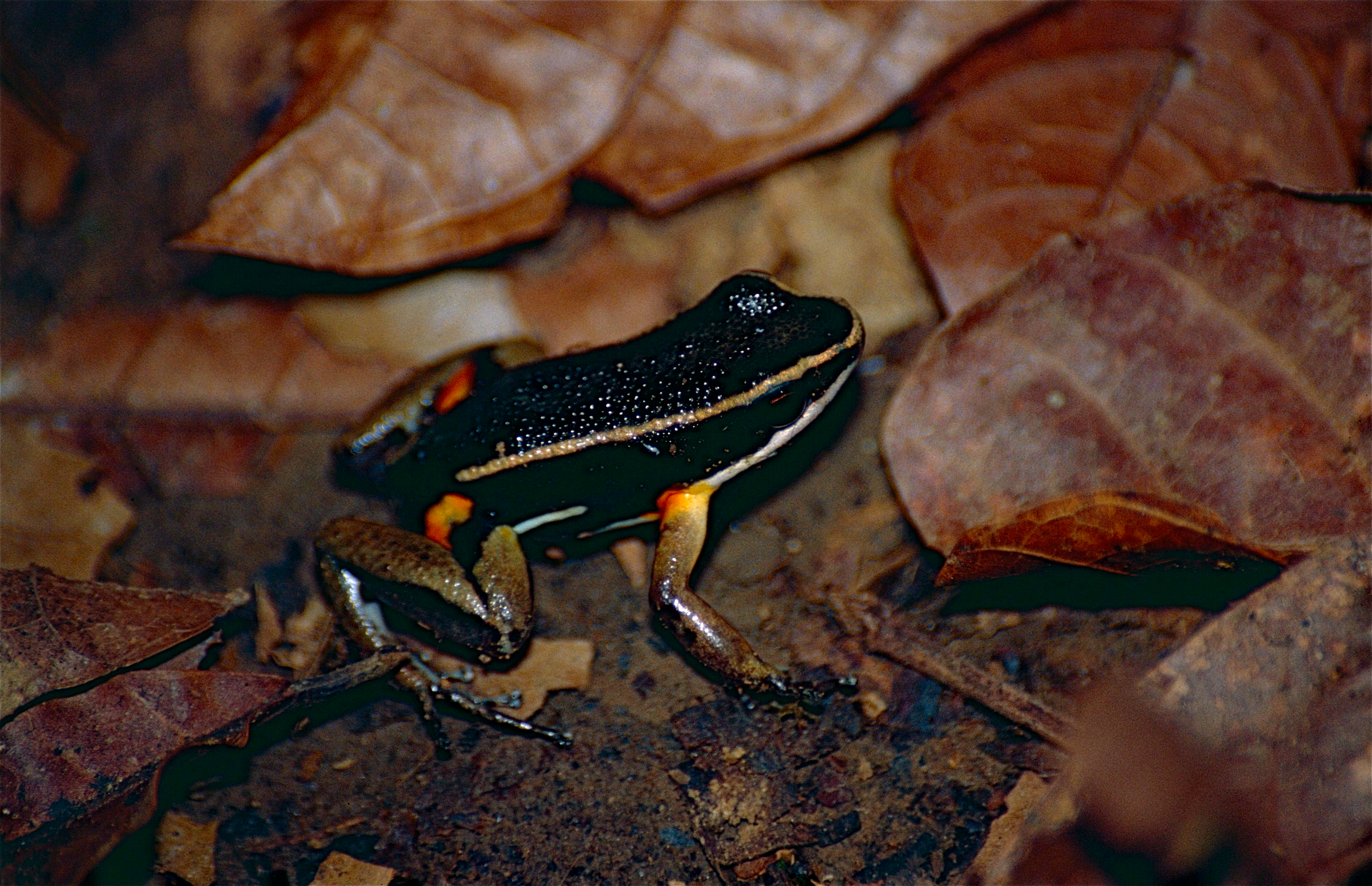
French Guiana

Allobates femoralis is a small frog, the males growing to 28 to 33 mm (1.1 to 1.3 in) in length and the females being marginally larger. The coloration on the back is dark brown or black and the limbs are colored dark brown. The throat is black and the belly is white, marked with black. A pale brown dorso-lateral stripe runs from the snout to the base of the legs and an intermittent white ventro-lateral line runs from the snout to the arm and onwards to the leg. There is an orange-yellow patch behind the arm and a half-moon shaped orange patch on the outside of the thigh. A. femoralis resembles Lithodytes lineatus in general appearance, but L. lineatus has a dorso-lateral line encircling the back, legs barred with dark and light bands of colour, and two or more orange patches on each thigh.

== Habitat and distribution ==
Allobates femoralis is distributed in the Amazon basin and tropical eastern South America. Its geographical range includes Guyana, Suriname, French Guiana and Brazil, and the eastern parts of Colombia, Ecuador, Peru and Bolivia. A single reported sighting in Venezuela may have referred to Ameerega picta. It is found on the forest floor, usually at elevations below 300 m (1,000 ft), but in Colombia and Ecuador occurs at altitudes of up to 1,000 m (3,300 ft).

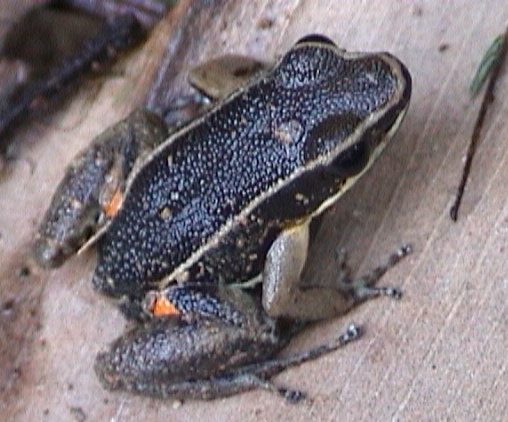
Allobates femoralis

== Biology ==
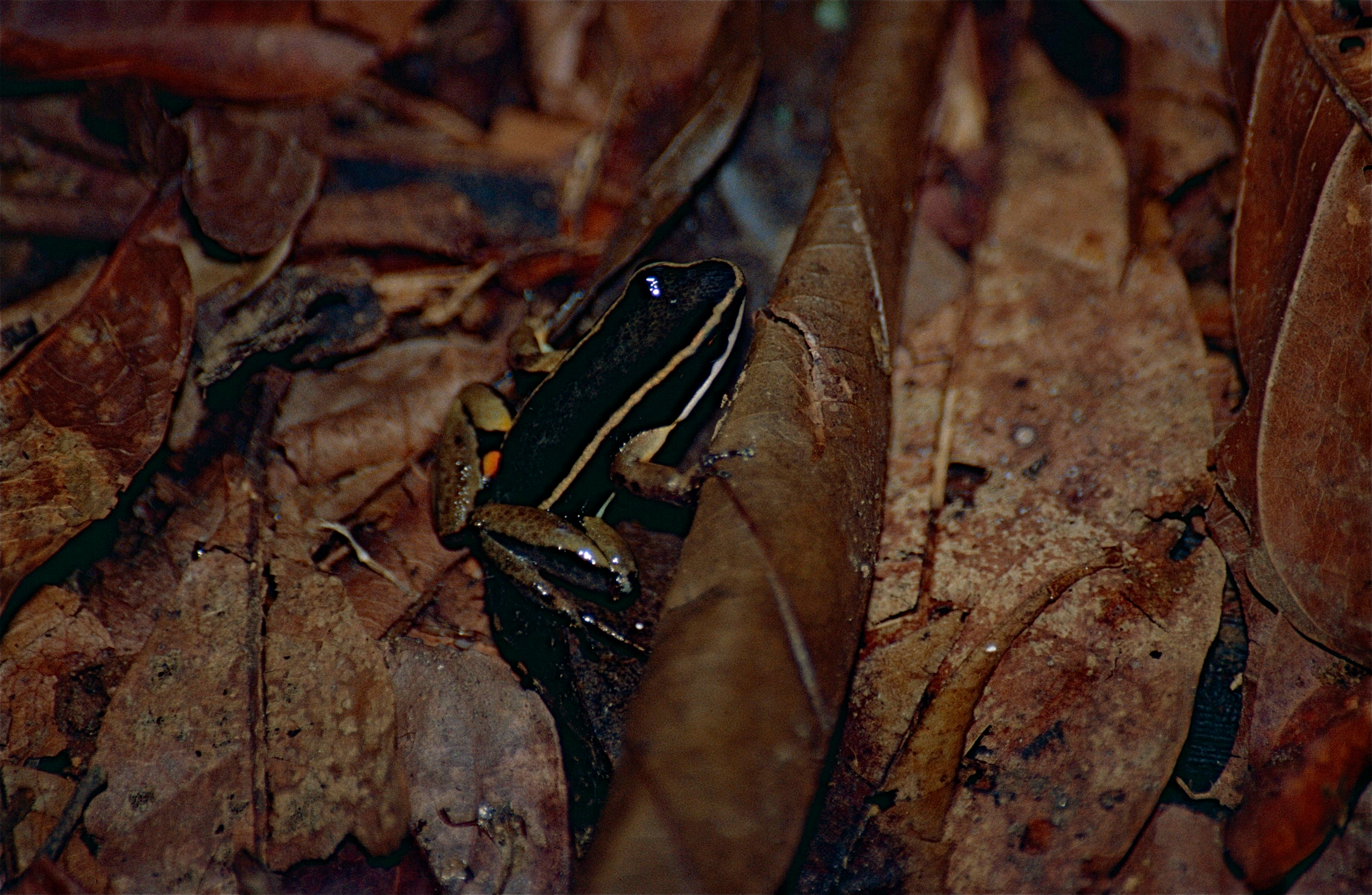
Allobates femoralis on dead leaves

Allobates femoralis is a terrestrial frog species. It is active during the day, and it feeds on small insects such as beetles, crickets, roaches and ants; the juveniles largely feed on springtails. Breeding takes place between November and April, peaking in January or February. The males are territorial and court females for two to three days before a clutch of eight to seventeen eggs is laid in a nest among fallen leaves. The male guards the eggs, and after they have hatched, he carries the tadpoles to pools of water on his back.

== Mating and reproduction ==
=== Courtship behavior ===
Pair formation is initiated when the male Allobates femoralis detects the presence of a female A. femoralis. He then leads her to the oviposition site, which is always covered, and the female lays clutches of eggs between dead leaves or beneath a log. The leaves or the log thus form a roof over the clutch. This behavior known as the "courtship march" refers to when the male initiates the courtship and the female follows him to the oviposition site.

Although courtship components vary across species of poison frogs, A. femoralis is known to have the longest courtship duration among its species. Females rarely reject males and their gesture of courtship, and females also do not evaluate male quality/fitness during courtship. However, females sometimes demand prolonged courtship for the following reasons: verification of male's territory ownership, ovulation stimulation, and benefit of spatial learning and finding clutches in case of mate loss.

=== Polygyny ===
Male A. femoralis can court more than one female A. femoralis. When the male courts two females, he marches alternately with each female, and while the male courts one female, the other female stays in the spot where the male conducted her before moving on to his current courtship interaction. And the females sharing courtship with the same male do not interact aggressively with each other.

=== Male/male interactions ===
Unlike females that do not show aggression under polygyny, A. femoralis males interact aggressively with other males when it comes to territorial defense. During the 'courtship march' when an A. femoralis male searches for an ovipostion site, the female can be intercepted by a competing male, which the female will start following. This leads to physical aggression between males that can last about 15 minutes, where eventually, one of the males will leave the oviposition site. It is suggested that visual signals play an important role in male-male aggression.

=== Reproductive behavioral divergence ===
Behavioral divergence is observed within the range of A. femoralis from different localities. The divergence is observed in various factors, including the number of notes of A. femoralis call, the presence of cephalic amplexus, and the presence of visual components of the courtship behavior (throat display, limb lifting, circling, leg stretching). Researchers suggest that the process of diversification may be understood in depth through geographic variation in sexual signals.

==== Reproductive behavior specific to Allobates femoralis from Central Amazonia ====
The reproductive behavior of A. femoralis from Central Amazonia consists of three signals: visual, acoustic, and tactile.

In terms of visual signal, the signal differs between the two sexes. Females display their visual signal through repetitive passing of their arms and legs over their bellies during the courtship march. On the other hand, males have wider range of visual signals: throat display, limb lifting, circling, and leg stretching. As the male guides the female through his territory, he shows his various visual signals through inflating his vocal sax without vocalizing, moving him arm or leg up-and-down rapidly, pivoting around his own axis, and stretching his legs and showing the orange patches of his thighs.

In terms of acoustic signaling, this signal is mainly exhibited by males. Males emit advertisement calls and courtship calls, and females follow males that emit both calls. When the female stops following the male, the male comes back and emits calls until the female starts following him again. Courtship call is distinctive from advertisement call due to having lower frequency and being emitted at short distances from females.

In terms of tactile signaling, the signals are exchanged between two sexes during the last minutes of the courtship, when they are near or inside the oviposition site. Being near the oviposition site usually indicates the end of the courtship march when the male enters several oviposition sites and examines the sites before choosing the right site for him and his mate. During this process, the male sometimes mounts and instantly falls from the female without being in amplexus. However, after the site is chosen and the pair is inside the oviposition site, the female always initiates the tactile signals and interactions by touching the male's snout or side of body with her snout or putting her top of head under his jaw. As the female stands paired to the male, the male grabs her head and climbs on her dorsum. Then, the male clasps the female with his front limbs pressed against her chin, making the amplexus cephalic.

With the formation of the amplexus, the egg deposition begins. After the amplexus, the male remains in the oviposition site next to the female for about 2.6 minutes on average and leaves the site. On the other hand, the female remains in the site for about 51 minutes on average and circles around the eggs.

=== Female movement and space use ===
Being known for their complex behavior and diverse reproductive and parental care strategies, A. femoralis is especially known for their fine-scale space use of the non-territorial females who do not engage in acoustic and visual displays. In terms of the general movement and space use of A. femoralis females, they have generally low movement and spend most of their time in one to three smaller centers of use. And even when they leave their centers of use, they do not exhibit wide-ranging exploratory behavior.

Female movement and space use is significantly influenced by the following factors: subsequent mating event and reproductive behavior, temperature, and cumulative rainfall.

In terms of subsequent mating event and reproductive behavior, there is a significant increase in female movement in the afternoons of courtship initiation days when the male calling activity is at its peak. Based on this observation, researchers suggest that mating related movement is influenced by acoustic cues. Females also leave the oviposition site in the morning when there is low male calling activity, in which researcher suggests that female's decision of where to go after mating is affected by other factors than male vocalization.

Temperature and cumulative rainfall are the factors that influence the daily movement of A. femoralis females. There is an increase in female movement with lower temperature and higher precipitation (cumulative rainfall).

In terms of temperature, since environmental/habitat temperature in the tropics ranges around the upper thermal limits of amphibians, this makes frogs susceptible to climatic change. The environmental temperature affects the frog's physiological function and influences the female's behaviors and actions accordingly.

In terms of cumulative rainfall, rainfall has a strong correlation with the male calling activity. At the seasonal scale, there is higher male calling activity during wet months of monthly rainfall, and there is also higher concentration of reproduction in the late wet season. During dry season, there are less but sporadic reproduction occurrences, and these occurrences are possibly caused by isolated episodes of rainfall. Since male vocal signals influence the female's mating behavior, rainfall makes its indirect influence on the female's movement through impacting their mating behavior. Considering that rainfall is seasonal, its influence relates with the timing of the female's movement.

On the other hand, there is one factor that does influence the female movement and space use, which is the density of males in the surroundings. The number of surrounding males does not correlate with female time management and space use. In short, traveled distances and activity patterns on days of courtship and mating differ considerably from days without reproduction. Increased travel distances on days with courtship and mating suggest that reproductive behavior is an important factor in prompting female movement.

== Parental care ==
=== Tadpole transport ===
Unlike all other reproduction-related behaviors that take place in the male A. femoralis territory, the tadpole development must happen in a water area large and deep enough for metamorphosis to occur completely. Such area is seldom found directly or close to male territories of A. femoralis, so A. femoralis, especially males, must search for extraterritorial regions and resources that are suitable for tadpole development sites, which put constraints on male spatial behavior. Furthermore, the orientation of tadpole deposition sites to male territories can introduce directionality in a spatial setup.

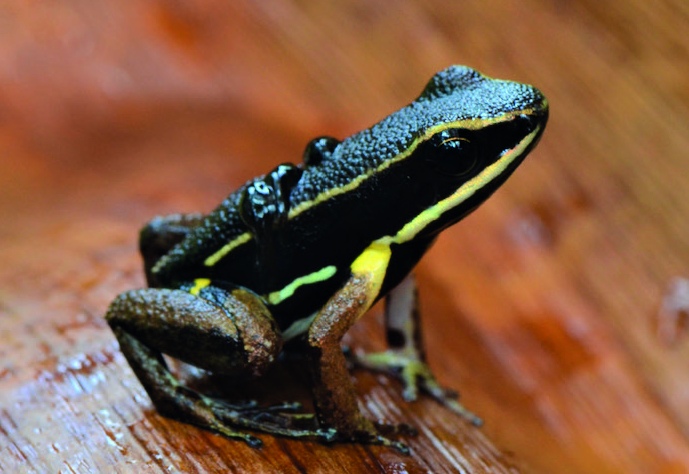
With tadpoles. Amapá, Brazil

A. femoralis routinely shuttle tadpoles from terrestrial territories to dispersed aquatic deposition sites, and the transport can take from several hours to days. for successful reproduction, they rely on utilizing multiple, widely dispersed, temporary deposition sites. While the tadpole transport is mainly done by males, females are also observed to shuttle tadpoles in cases of mate loss. Males transport tadpoles as far as 180 m away from their own territory, and the more distant the deposition site is, the more tadpoles males transport each time. Since the time it takes to shuttle tadpoles comes with a cost of losing territories and reproductive opportunities, this activity requires A. femoralis to have strong spatial memory and learning and the ability to use the learning flexibly in terms of processing information about distances and directions, finding new routes in familiar and unfamiliar area, and ultimately navigating themselves and finding the most ideal route for transport.

Returning back to the original male territory after tadpole transport is known as the homing performance. Under polygyny system, A. femoralis males often attend multiple (up to five) clutches of eggs, which plays a major role in the selectiveness for a high homing performance in males. Failure of homing performance (failing to return to the original male territory) would cause a severe cost in reproductive output due to loss of clutches, Therefore, having good spatial learning and directionality is crucial in A. femoralis.

== Conservation status ==
The IUCN lists Allobates femoralis as being of "Least Concern" regarding conservation status. This is because it has a wide range and is common throughout much of that range. Its population seems to be steady and no particular threats have been identified.
