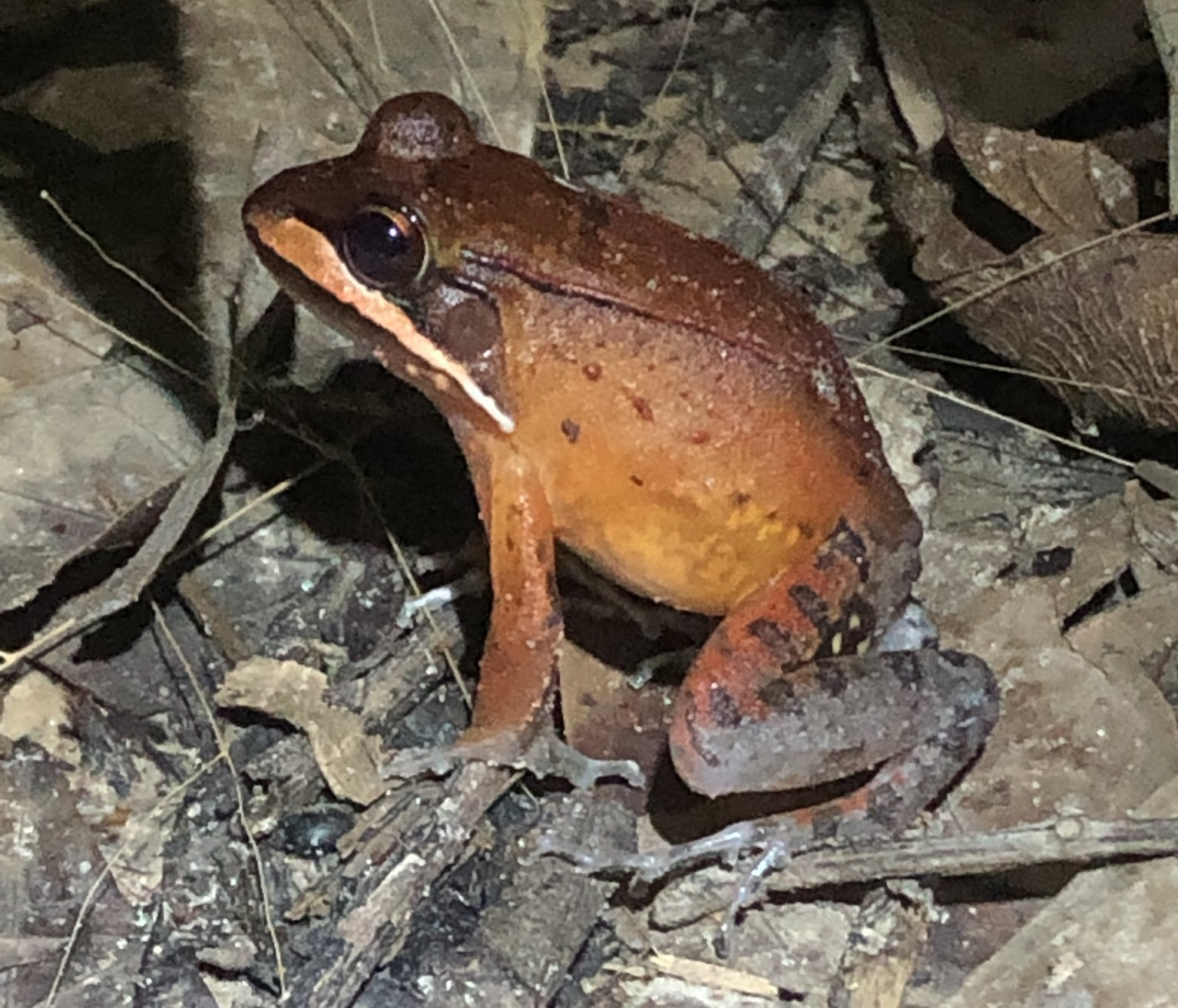

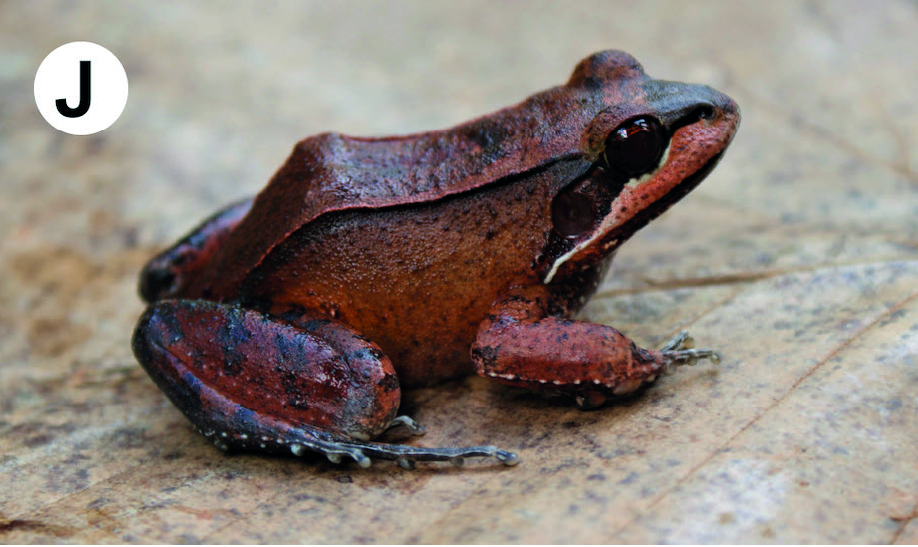

Conservation status
- Least Concern (IUCN 3.1)

Scientific classification
- Kingdom: Animalia
- Phylum: Chordata
- Class: Amphibia
- Order: Anura
- Family: Leptodactylidae
- Genus: Leptodactylus
- Species: L. rhodomystax

Binomial name
- Leptodactylus rhodomystax Boulenger, 1884

Synonyms
- Leptodactylus stictigularis Noble, 1923

= Leptodactylus rhodomystax =

Species of frog

Leptodactylus rhodomystax (common name: Loreto white-lipped frog, rose-lipped thin-toed frog) is a species of frog in the family Leptodactylidae. It is found in the Guianas (French Guiana, Guyana, and Suriname) through northern and central Brazil to Amazonian Bolivia, Colombia, Peru, and Ecuador, and possibly in Venezuela where most if not all records represent misidentifications of Leptodactylus riveroi.

Leptodactylus rhodomystax are small frogs: the two syntypes measured 25 mm (0.98 in) in snout–vent length.

== Habitat ==
Leptodactylus rhodomystax in found in leaf-litter on forest floor and in swamps in tropical rainforest as well as on the edges of clearings and in more open areas in forest. It breeds in semi-permanent waterbodies.

== Reproduction ==
Leptodactylus rhodomystax is not very choosy about breeding sites and uses many types of temporary and semi-permanent pools. Males call from within holes in the ground. They seem not to form choruses, and usually only one or few males can be heard calling at a particular site. Eggs are laid in foam nests.
