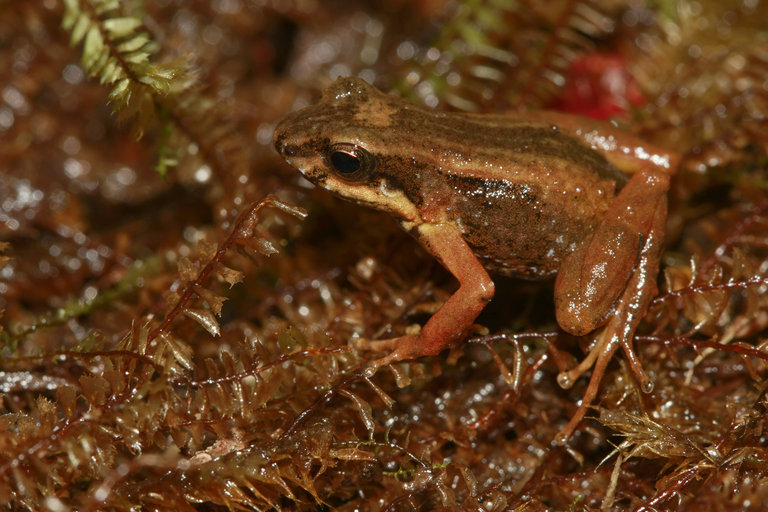

Conservation status
- Critically Endangered (IUCN 3.1)

Scientific classification
- Kingdom: Animalia
- Phylum: Chordata
- Class: Amphibia
- Order: Anura
- Family: Aromobatidae
- Genus: Allobates
- Species: A. chalcopis

Binomial name
- Allobates chalcopis (Kaiser, Coloma, and Gray, 1994)

Synonyms
- Colostethus chalcopis Kaiser, Coloma, and Gray, 1994

= Allobates chalcopis =

Martinique volcano frog

Species of amphibian

Allobates chalcopis, also known as the Martinique volcano frog or ravine rocket frog, is a species of frog in the family Aromobatidae. It is endemic to Martinique, where it is found at high-altitude areas including Mount Pelée and potentially most of the Carbet Mountains. It is threatened by climate change, which has led to it being extirpated from the lower-lying reaches of its already-small range, and may lead to a continued population decline and range contraction.

Allobates chalcopis is the only aromobatid species endemic to an oceanic island. This has led to a suggestion that it is not native but an introduced species, synonymous with some mainland species. However, examination of new specimens with molecular phylogenetics methods suggests it is truly distinct from the mainland Allobates, and highly diverged from its closest relatives. This conclusion is also supported by morphological and ecological evidence, thereby strengthening the position that it is a true endemic.

== Description ==
Allobates chalcopis is a small frog with males measuring about 17 mm (0.67 in) in snout–vent length and females about 16–18 mm (0.63–0.71 in). Its dorsum is light brown with darker markings. Males have a distinctive, black throat, tapering off to a dark gray, whereas females have uniformly pale orange throat and venter.

The tadpoles are terrestrial, free-living, and endotrophic—they do not feed but rely on stored yolk. They grow to a length of at least 12 mm (0.47 in). The body is ventrally flattened.

== Habitat ==
Allobates chalcopis was originally described from forested ravines of Mount Pelée at an elevation of about 500 m (1,600 ft) asl. Extensive search in 2011 failed to spot the species in this habitat, but it was discovered higher up on the mountain, at about 800–1,400 m (2,600–4,600 ft) asl, that is, to the summit of the mountain. The current range starts from the transition zone between forest and savanna, the latter being the vegetation type found higher up on the mountain. A 2012 survey also found it on Piton Boucher, a member of the Carbet Mountains to the southeast of Pelée, at 1,000 m asl. Although not yet surveyed, it may be present on other peaks of the Carbet Mountains massif.

== Conservation ==
The International Union for Conservation of Nature assessed Allobates chalcopis in 2010 as Vulnerable. However, in light of its disappearance from the lower altitudes due to climate change and the very small remaining range (and the evidence of endemicity), it was reclassified as Critically Endangered in 2021.
