= Tapajós-Arapiuns Extractive Reserve =

Protected area in Pará, Brazil

- Reserva Extrativista Tapajós-Arapiuns
- IUCN category VI (protected area with sustainable use of natural resources)
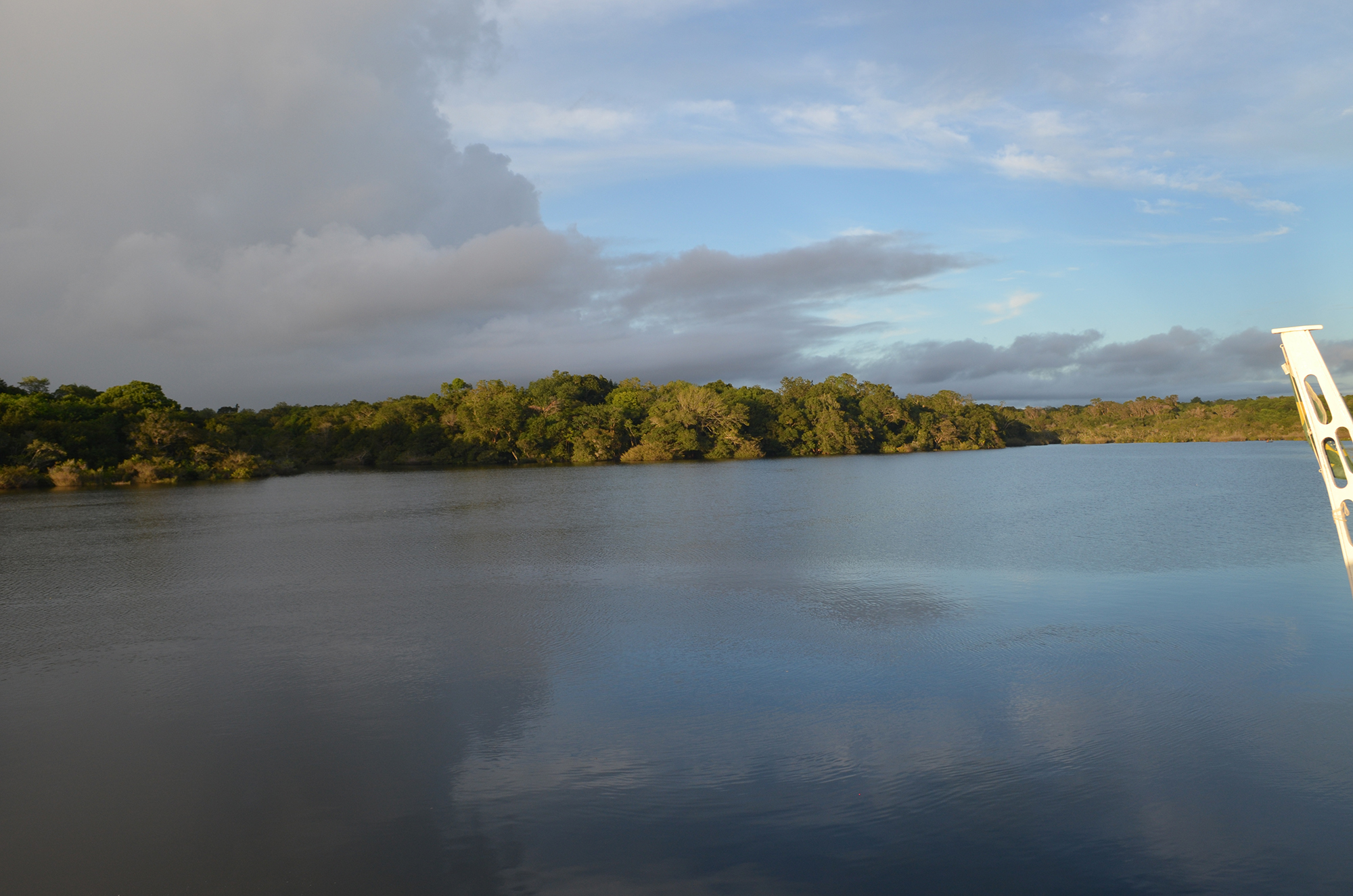
- The river and forest of the reserve in early morning

- Location within Brazil
- Nearest city: Santarém, Pará
- Coordinates: 3°10′13″S 55°37′47″W
- Area: 647,611 hectares (1,600,280 acres)
- Designation: Extractive reserve
- Created: 16 November 1998
- Administrator: Chico Mendes Institute for Biodiversity Conservation

The Tapajós-Arapiuns Extractive Reserve (Portuguese: Reserva Extrativista Tapajós-Arapiuns is an extractive reserve in the state of Pará, Brazil.

== Location ==
The Tapajós-Arapiuns Extractive Reserve is divided between the municipalities of Santarém (68.05%) and Aveiro (31.95%) in the state of Pará. It has an area of 647,611 hectares (1,600,280 acres). The reserve lies along the left (west) shore of the Tapajós river in the stretch where it expands to a width of about 8 kilometres (5.0 mi) before joining the Amazon River at Santarém. The Arapiuns River runs through the reserve before joining the Tapajós.

The southwest corner of the reserve meets the Amazônia National Park. The reserve adjoins the Maró Indigenous Territory to the west. The Tapajós National Forest is on the opposite side of the Tapajós River, to the east. The proposed South Amazon Ecological Corridor would link the Tapajós-Arapiuns Extractive Reserve to other protected areas and indigenous territories in the region.

== Environment ==
Elevations in the reserve are from 2 to 216 metres (6 ft 7 in to 708 ft 8 in). In the eastern portion along the Tapajós and the northwest altitudes range from 2 to 51 metres (6 ft 7 in to 167 ft 4 in). Temperatures average 25 °C (77 °F). There is high rainfall averaging 2,400 millimetres (94 in) annually, with no marked dry season. Soils are generally infertile. Dense rainforest covers 88% of the reserve, or 591,420 hectares (1,461,400 acres). The vegetation consists of large trees, woody lianas and abundant epiphytes. The Amazonian manatee (Trichechus inunguis) is a protected species in the reserve.

As of 2005 the reserve may have already been suffering from the effects of the Tapajós-Teles Pires waterway, which was causing massive deforestation on the borders of the reserve along the Tapajós and Arapiuns rivers. By 2012 about 51,361 hectares (126,920 acres) of the vegetation had been modified by people, particularly along the banks of rivers and streams. This has caused some siltation and eutrophication of the water bodies.

== Economy ==
In 2007 there were 3,076 families with 18,291 people, concentrated in 64 small villages along the banks of the two major rivers. Typically each village would have about 30 families with about 6 people per house. The buildings are made of natural forest materials. Most villages have an elementary school. São Pedro do Arapiuns has a school that teaches up to grade 8. The general level of education is very low. 35.5% of breadwinners are functionally illiterate and 45.3% had grade 3 education. About 67.6% of households have children attending school. As of 2002 there were just two health centres.

The communities in the extractive reserve have been unusually active in developing the management plan and projects related to environmental education, improvement of infrastructure for sanitation, health and education, and sustainable extraction of natural resources, manly rubber, Brazil nuts and açaí palm fruit. The families engage in subsistence agriculture, including cassava, maize and açaí, and subsistence hunting and fishing. Other fruits are extracted from the forest, mostly for family consumption but with a small surplus for sale. Most families raise chickens and pigs. The main source of income comes from cassava flour. 33.6% of households engage in crafts, mostly the women, making baskets and sieves from lianas and clay crockery, mainly for home use.

== History ==
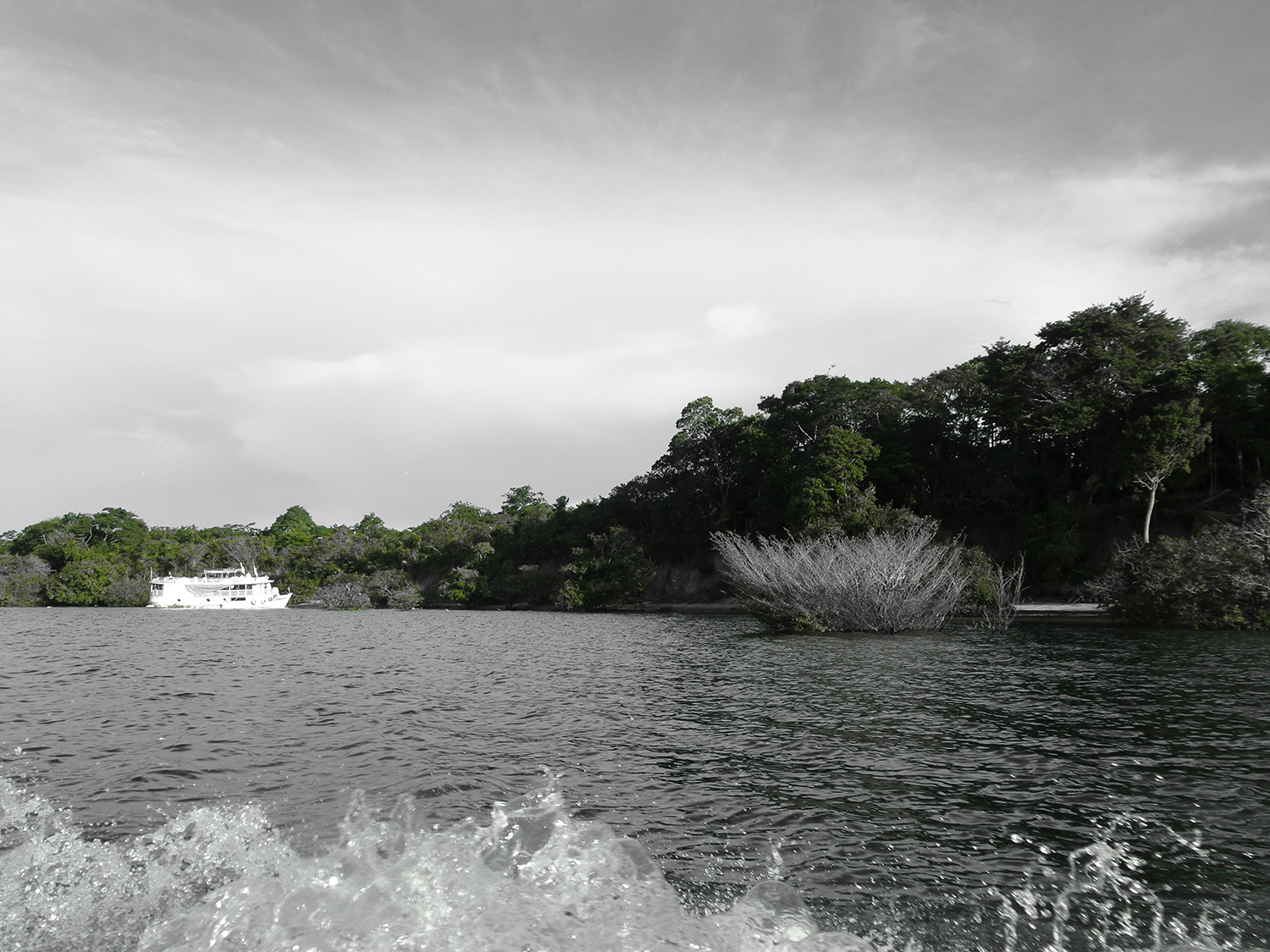
Landscape in the reserve

The Tapajós-Arapiuns Extractive Reserve was created by federal decree on 16 November 1998. It is administered by the Chico Mendes Institute for Biodiversity Conservation. It is classed as IUCN protected area category VI (protected area with sustainable use of natural resources). An extractive reserve is an area used by traditional extractive populations whose livelihood is based on extraction, subsistence agriculture and small-scale animal raising. Its basic objectives are to protect the livelihoods and culture of these people and to ensure sustainable use of natural resources.

The utilisation plan was submitted by the Associação da Resex Tapajós-Arapiuns, Associação Comunitária da Suruaca/Tapajós and Associação Intercomunitária de Boim/Rio Tapajós e CNS. It was approved on 5 November 1999. On 30 October 2003 the Instituto Nacional de Colonização e Reforma Agrária (INCRA: National Institute for Colonization and Agrarian Reform) recognised the reserve as meeting the needs of 3,500 families, who would qualify for PRONAF support. This was adjusted to 2,850 units on 29 September 2005, then to 3,650 units on 20 December 2006.

The deliberative council was created on 10 May 2004. On 5 October 2011 ICMBio ceded the right to use the reserve to the Tapajós-Arapiuns-Tapajoara associations. The management plan was approved on 20 November 2014. A working group was created on 28 May 2015 to support implementation of the Forest Carbon Demonstration Project (Projeto Demonstrativo de Carbono Florestal).

== Sources ==
- Ayres, José Márcio; Da Fonseca, Gustavo A. B.; Rylands, Anthony B.; Queiroz, Helder L.; Pinto, Luiz Paulo; Masterson, Donald; Cavalcanti, Roberto B. (2005), Os Corredores Ecológicos das Florestas Tropicais do Brasil (PDF) (in Portuguese), Sociedade Civil Mamirauá, archived from the original (PDF) on 2016-07-31
- Resex Tapajós-Arapiuns (in Portuguese), ICMBio: Chico Mendes Institute for Biodiversity Conservation, archived from the original on 2020-09-16
- RESEX Tapajós-Arapiuns (in Portuguese), ISA: Instituto Socioambiental
- Unidade de Conservação: Reserva Extrativista Tapajós-Arapiuns (in Portuguese), MMA: Ministério do Meio Ambiente
