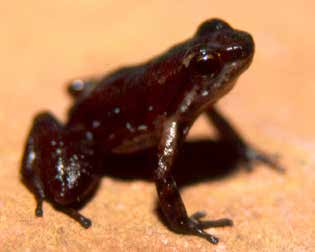

Conservation status
- Data Deficient (IUCN 3.1)

Scientific classification
- Kingdom: Animalia
- Phylum: Chordata
- Class: Amphibia
- Order: Anura
- Family: Aromobatidae
- Genus: Anomaloglossus
- Species: A. triunfo

Binomial name
- Anomaloglossus triunfo (Barrio-Amorós, Fuentes, and Rivas, 2004)
- A. triunfo is only known from Cerro Santa Rosa in the Bolívar state, Venezuela

Synonyms
- Colostethus triunfo Barrio-Amorós, Fuentes, and Rivas, 2004

= Anomaloglossus triunfo =

Species of frog

Anomaloglossus triunfo is a species of frog in the family Aromobatidae. It is endemic to Venezuela and is only known from the summit and slopes of Cerro Santa Rosa (its type locality), on the northwestern slopes of Sierra de Lema, Bolívar state. It might be synonym of Anomaloglossus parkerae. The specific name triunfo is the name of the camp site that was used as the base for herpetological surveys by one of the scientists who described the species.

== Description ==
Two adult males in the type series measure 19–20 mm (0.7–0.8 in), whereas four adult and subadult females measure 14–20 mm (0.6–0.8 in) in snout–vent length. The snout is rounded in profile and rounded to nearly truncate in dorsal and ventral view. The tympanum is indistinct and concealed by the supratympanic fold. The fingers and toes bear moderately expanded terminal discs. The toes are moderately webbed. Dorsal coloration is brown. There is a dark brown inter-orbital bar, a large V-shaped mark between the shoulders, two symmetrical para-vertebral spots at midbody, and a single small and median posterior spot near the end of body. Canthal and supratympanic stripes are dark brown. The upper lip is whitish. The iris is bronze.

The male advertisement call is a long "trill" repeated continuously during the day. Tadpoles are unknown.

== Habitat and conservation ==
The species is known from tall evergreen forest at elevations between 350 and 685 m (1,148 and 2,247 ft) above sea level. It occurs both in forest floor litter along creeks and at quiet pools along small streams. It is only known from streams without large fish. Adults are fast-moving frogs. Reproduction presumably involves free-living tadpoles.

Threats to this species are unknown. Its known range is protected—all Venezuelan tepuis are designated as national monument protected areas.
