= César L. Barrio-Amorós =

Spanish herpetologist and anthropologist

César Luis Barrio-Amorós
- Born: Spain
- Education: University of Barcelona
- Known for: Neotropical Anura specialist
- Scientific career
- Fields: Anthropology, Herpetology
- Workplaces: University of the Andes, Venezuela

César Luis Barrio-Amorós is a Spanish anthropologist and herpetologist working in Venezuela.

He graduated from the University of Barcelona. He is a specialist in neotropical Anura (frogs). A total of 62 different taxon names are authored by Barrio Amorós.

== Work ==
=== Described species ===
- Adelophryne patamona MacCulloch, Lathrop, Kok, Minter, Khan & Barrio-Amorós, 2008
- Allobates algorei Barrio-Amorós & Santos, 2009
- Allobates caribe (Barrio-Amorós, Rivas-Fuenmayor & Kaiser, 2006)
- Anomaloglossus breweri (Barrio-Amorós, 2006)
- Anomaloglossus moffetti Barrio-Amorós & Brewer-Carias, 2008
- Anomaloglossus triunfo (Barrio-Amorós, Fuentes-Ramos & Rivas-Fuenmayor, 2004)
- Anomaloglossus wothuja (Barrio-Amorós, Fuentes-Ramos & Rivas-Fuenmayor, 2004)
- Atractus acheronius Passos, Fuenmayor & Barrio-Amorós, 2009
- Atractus matthewi Markezich & Barrio-Amorós, 2004
- Atractus multidentatus Passos, Fuenmayor & Barrio-Amorós, 2009
- Bolitoglossa spongai Barrio-Amorós & Fuentes-Ramos, 1999
- Ceuthomantis aracamuni (Barrio-Amorós & Molina, 2006)
- Cryptobatrachus remotus Infante-Rivero, Rojas-Runjaic & Barrio-Amorós, 2009
- Hypsiboas tepuianus Barrio-Amorós & Brewer-Carias, 2008
- Phyllomedusa neildi Barrio-Amorós, 2006
- Mabuya altamazonica Miralles, Barrio-Amorós, Rivas, Chaparro-Auza, 2006
- Mabuya nebulosylvestris Miralles, Fuenmayor, Bonillo, Schargel, Barros, García-Perez & Barrio-Amorós, 2009
- Mabuya zuliae Miralles, Fuenmayor, Bonillo, Schargel, Barros, García-Perez & Barrio-Amorós, 2009
- Pristimantis fasciatus Barrio-Amorós, Rojas-Runjaic & Infante-Rivero, 2008
- Pristimantis lassoalcalai Barrio-Amorós, Rojas-Runjaic & Barros, 2010
- Pristimantis marahuaka (Fuentes-Ramos & Barrio-Amorós, 2004)
- Pristimantis rivasi Barrio-Amorós, Rojas-Runjaic & Barros, 2010
- Pristimantis sarisarinama Barrio-Amorós & Brewer-Carias, 2008
- Pristimantis turik Barrio-Amorós, Rojas-Runjaic & Infante-Rivero, 2008
- Pristimantis yukpa Barrio-Amorós, Rojas-Runjaic & Infante-Rivero, 2008
- Pristimantis yustizi (Barrio-Amorós & Chacón-Ortiz, 2004)
- Stefania breweri Barrio-Amorós & Fuentes-Ramos, 2003
