= Anomaloglossus mitaraka =

Scientific classification
- Kingdom: Animalia
- Phylum: Chordata
- Class: Amphibia
- Order: Anura
- Family: Aromobatidae
- Genus: Anomaloglossus
- Species: A. mitaraka

Binomial name
- Anomaloglossus mitaraka Fouquet, Vacher, Courtois, Deschamps, Ouboter, Jairam, Gaucher, Dubois, and Kok, 2019

Species of frog

Anomaloglossus mitaraka is a species of frog in the family Aromobatidae. It is endemic to French Guiana and Suriname and suspected in Brazil.

== Original description ==
- Fouquet A; Vacher J-P; Courtois EA; Deschamps D; Oubater P; Jairam R; Gaucher P; Dubois A; Kok PJR (2019). "A new species of Anomaloglossus (Anura: Aromobatidae) of the stepheni group with the redescription of A. baeobatrachus (Boistel and de Massary, 1999), and an amended definition of A. leopardus Ouboter and Jairam, 2012". Zootaxa (Abstract). 4576 (3): 439–460.1. doi:10.11646/zootaxa.4576.3.2. PMID 31715747.
