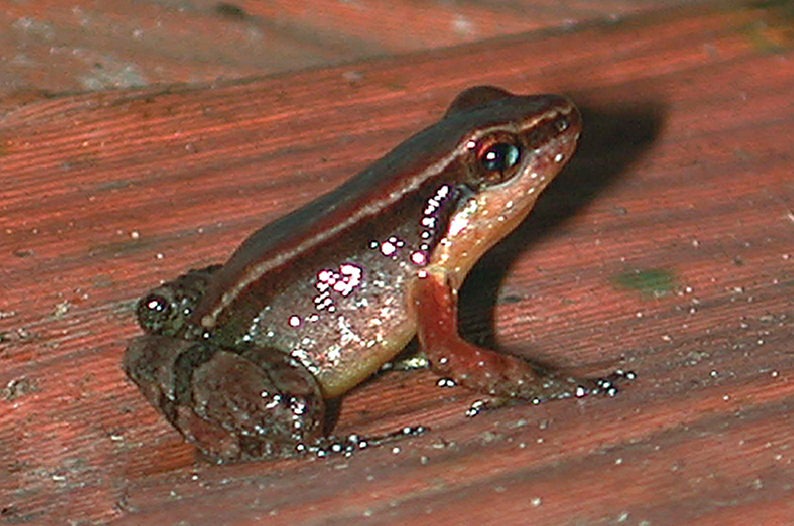

Scientific classification
- Kingdom: Animalia
- Phylum: Chordata
- Class: Amphibia
- Order: Anura
- Family: Aromobatidae
- Genus: Anomaloglossus
- Species: A. meansi

Binomial name
- Anomaloglossus meansi Kok, Nicolaï, Lathrop, and MacCulloch, 2018

= Anomaloglossus meansi =

Species of frog

Anomaloglossus meansi is a species of frog in the family Aromobatidae. Scientists found it in Guyana.

== Description ==
The adult male frog measures 18.86 mm in from nose to rear end and the adult female frog 21.26 mm. There is a thin dorsolateral stripe on each side of the body from the snout to the urostyle.

== Habitat ==
This frog lives in cloud forests on tepui flatlands. Scientists observed it on the Ayanganna and Wokomung tepui between 1234 and 1490 meters above sea level.

== Threats ==
The scientists who first described this frog recommended that it be classified as data deficient per IUCN standards.
