= Maringma-tepui =

- Location within Guyana

Highest point
- Elevation: 2,147 m (7,044 ft)
- Coordinates: 05°13′N 60°35′W

Geography
- Location: Cuyuni-Mazaruni, Guyana

Maringma-tepui, also written Mount Maringma and historically known as Mount Marima, is a small tepui of the Pacaraima Mountains in Cuyuni-Mazaruni, Guyana. It is known as Malaima-tepui in the local Akawaio language. Most published sources place it just inside Guyanese territory, very close to the border with Brazil, and around 17 kilometres (11 mi) east of Roraima-tepui. However, the mountain remains the subject of considerable toponymic confusion and its name has been applied to at least one other nearby peak.^{[nb a]}

The village of Wayalayeng lies at the base of Maringma-tepui and it is from here that the mountain was explored in May–July 2004 by a botanical team of the Smithsonian Institution. Led by David Clarke, this was the first expedition to reach the mountain's summit. It was followed by two further expeditions in February 2006 and late 2007, by Bruce Means and Philippe J. R. Kok et al., respectively.

Maringma-tepui has a maximum elevation of around 2,147 m (7,044 ft) or 2,134 m (7,001 ft). The summit plateau has an area of roughly 170 hectares (420 acres) and is highly uneven, allowing water to collect in many deep, swamp-like pools. It is predominantly covered in low-growing "tepui meadow" vegetation, quaking peat bog, and some dwarf forests of Bonnetia roraimae, with few areas of exposed rock. The dominant plant families include Bonnetiaceae, Bromeliaceae, Clusiaceae, Orchidaceae, Rapateaceae, Sarraceniaceae, and Xyridaceae. Temperatures vary widely on the summit plateau, with extremes of 13.5 and 37.5 °C recorded over a five-day period.

Native herpetofauna include the lizard species Arthrosaura hoogmoedi and Pantepuisaurus rodriguesi (Gymnophthalmidae), as well as the frog species Adelophryne patamona (Eleutherodactylidae); Anomaloglossus kaiei, Anomaloglossus megacephalus, and Anomaloglossus praderioi (Aromobatidae); and Oreophrynella macconnelli and Oreophrynella seegobini (Bufonidae).

== See also ==
- Distribution of Heliamphora

== Notes ==
a. The maps provided in Sarraceniaceae of South America place Maringma-tepui on the Brazil–Venezuela border, some distance southeast of Roraima-tepui. The book's authors also state that Maringma-tepui was incorrectly called "Mount Yakontipu" by Fleischmann et al. (2007) in their description of Drosera solaris.
