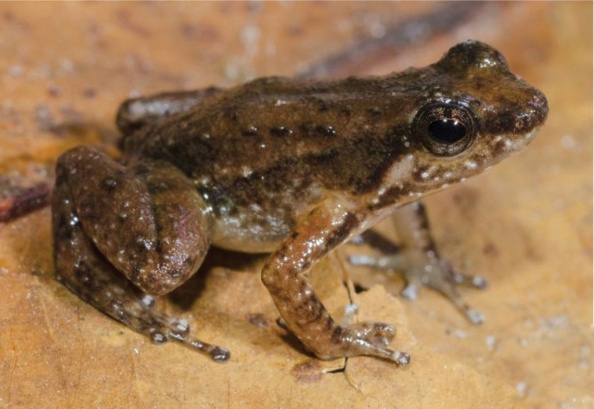

Conservation status
- Near Threatened (IUCN 3.1)

Scientific classification
- Kingdom: Animalia
- Phylum: Chordata
- Class: Amphibia
- Order: Anura
- Family: Aromobatidae
- Genus: Anomaloglossus
- Species: A. apiau

Binomial name
- Anomaloglossus apiau Fouquet, Souza, Nunes, Kok, Curcio, Carvalho, Grant, and Rodrigues, 2015

= Anomaloglossus apiau =

Species of frog

Anomaloglossus apiau is a species of frog in the family Aromobatidae. It is endemic to Brazil.

== Habitat ==
This frog lives in montaine and sub-montaine forests near rocky, fast-flowing streams Scientists saw it about between 500 and 1400 meters above sea level. It lives near streams.

This frog has been observed in one protected area: Parque Nacional da Serra da Mocidade.

== Reproduction ==
Scientists infer that these frogs reproduce in the same manner as their congeners: The female lays eggs on leaves, and the adult frogs carry the tadpoles to water.

== Threats ==
The IUCN classifies this frog as near threatened. Human habitation in and near the Serro do Apiau area is affecting some parts of its range, largely through wood collection and fires that reach high altitudes. Scientists also think that the fungal disease chytridiomycosis could kill these frogs. Climate change could affect this frog population because high-altitude organisms generally have difficulty migrating.

== Original description ==
- Fouquet A; Souza SM; Nunes PMS; Kok PJR; Curcio FF; De Carvalho CM; Grant T; Rodrigues MT (2015). "Two new endangered species of Anomaloglossus (Anura: Aromabatidae) from Roraima State, northern Brazil". Zootaxa. 3926: 191–210.
