= Anomaloglossus megacephalus =

Conservation status
- Data Deficient (IUCN 3.1)

Scientific classification
- Kingdom: Animalia
- Phylum: Chordata
- Class: Amphibia
- Order: Anura
- Family: Aromobatidae
- Genus: Anomaloglossus
- Species: A. megacephalus

Binomial name
- Anomaloglossus megacephalus Kok, MacCulloch, Lathrop, Willaert, and Bossuyt, 2010

Species of frog

Anomaloglossus megacephalus is a species of frog in the family Aromobatidae. It is endemic to Guyana.

== Description ==
The adult female frog can reach 28.3 mm in snout-vent length.

== Habitat ==
This diurnal frog has been found near streams in low-canopy forests high on tepui flatlands. Scientists observed it between 1060 and 1490 meters above sea level.

== Reproduction ==
Scientists have not observed oviposition. After the eggs hatch, the adult frogs carry the tadpoles to streams.

== Threats ==
The IUCN classifies this frog as data deficient. Its habitat is largely pristine and rarely visited by humans, but there is some gold mining in one area.
