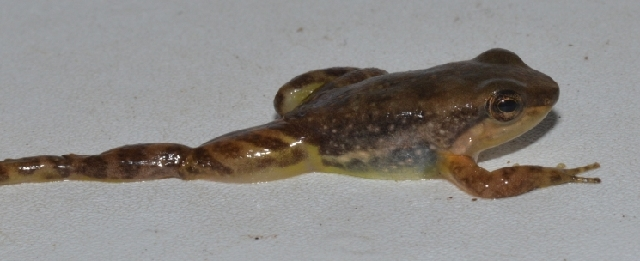

Conservation status
- Least Concern (IUCN 3.1)

Scientific classification
- Kingdom: Animalia
- Phylum: Chordata
- Class: Amphibia
- Order: Anura
- Family: Aromobatidae
- Genus: Rheobates
- Species: R. pseudopalmatus

Binomial name
- Rheobates pseudopalmatus (Rivero & Serna, 2000)

Synonyms
- Colostethus pseudopalmatus Rivero & Serna, 2000 "1995"

= Rheobates pseudopalmatus =

Species of frog

Rheobates pseudopalmatus is a species of frog in the family Aromobatidae. It is endemic to the Antioquia Department in Colombia where it is only known from the region of its type locality, Amalfi. It might be the same species as Rheobates palmatus. The ecology and habits of this species are unknown, but it is presumed to require streams for its larval development.
