= Anomaloglossus tepequem =

Conservation status
- Critically Endangered (IUCN 3.1)

Scientific classification
- Kingdom: Animalia
- Phylum: Chordata
- Class: Amphibia
- Order: Anura
- Family: Aromobatidae
- Genus: Anomaloglossus
- Species: A. tepequem

Binomial name
- Anomaloglossus tepequem Fouquet, Souza, Nunes, Kok, Curcio, Carvalho, Grant, and Rodrigues, 2015

Species of frog

Anomaloglossus tepequem is a frog in the family Aromobatidae. It is endemic to Brazil.

== Habitat ==
This diurnal frog is found in forests high on the tepui flatland. It has been observed between 500 and 1100 meters above sea level.

== Reproduction ==
Scientists infer that these frogs reproduce in the same manner as their congeners: The female lays eggs on the leaf litter, and the adult frogs carry the tadpoles to water.

== Threats ==
The IUCN classifies this frog as critically endangered, with no more than fifty mature individuals alive at any one time. In 1990, the population was much larger. Pollution and habitat disruption from gold mining may have killed this frog. The population drop is consistent with that of other amphibian species that were killed by the fungal disease chytridiomycosis, so scientists believe chytridiomycosis could be responsible, but they have yet to confirm the presence of the fungus on any of these frogs. Currently, tourism, tourism infrastructure, and conversion to pasturage threaten this frog.

== Original description ==
- Fouquet A; Souza SM; Nunes PMS; Kok PJR; Curcio FF; De Carvalho CM; Grant T; Rodrigues MT (2015). "Two new endangered species of Anomaloglossus (Anura: Aromabatidae) from Roraima State, northern Brazil". Zootaxa. 3926: 191–210.
