= Anomaloglossus dewynteri =

Conservation status
- Critically Endangered (IUCN 3.1)

Scientific classification
- Kingdom: Animalia
- Phylum: Chordata
- Class: Amphibia
- Order: Anura
- Family: Aromobatidae
- Genus: Anomaloglossus
- Species: A. meansi

Binomial name
- Anomaloglossus meansi Fouquet, Vacher, Courtois, Villette, Reizine, Gaucher, Jairam, Ouboter, and Kok, 2018

Species of frog

Anomaloglossus dewynteri is a species of frog in the family Aromobatidae. It is endemic to Mont Itoupé in French Guiana, where it inhabits rocky streams. It is a small frog measuring 19.4–20.4 mm (0.76–0.80 in) long in males.

== Taxonomy ==
Specimens of Anomaloglossus dewynteri had previously assigned to A. degranvillei, a species that was described in 1975 from a number of localities spread throughout French Guiana. A 2017 study of the complex found that the French Guianan populations traditionally assigned to A. degranvillei were deeply divergent, with only populations from some central French Guianan mountains belonging to A. degranvillei proper.

Anomaloglossus dewynteri was formally described in 2018 based on an adult male specimen collected from Mont Itoupé in French Guiana. The species is named after the herpetologist Maël Dewynter, who has worked in French Guiana and collected some of the species' paratypes.

== Description ==
Anomaloglossus dewynteri is a small frog measuring 19.4–20.4 mm (0.76–0.80 in) long in males.

== Distribution and ecology ==
This frog lives in rocky streams. Scientists observed it on the Itoupé massif. Scientists saw the frog in one protected place: Parc Amazonien de Guyane. The males sit near streams and call to the female frogs. After the eggs hatch, the male frogs carry the tadpoles to streams.

== Conservation ==
The IUCN classifies this frog as being critically endangered. Although they have not directly observed the fungus Batrachochytrium dendrobatidis on any of these frogs, but their population decline mirrors that of other amphibians affected by chytridiomycosis in French Guiana. This frog has not been shown to be subject to much habitat disturbance.
