= Anomaloglossus tamacuarensis =

Conservation status
- Least Concern (IUCN 3.1)

Scientific classification
- Kingdom: Animalia
- Phylum: Chordata
- Class: Amphibia
- Order: Anura
- Family: Aromobatidae
- Genus: Anomaloglossus
- Species: A. tamacuarensis

Binomial name
- Anomaloglossus tamacuarensis (Myers and Donnelly, 1997)

Synonyms
- Colostethus tamacuarensis Myers and Donnelly, 1997

Species of frog

Anomaloglossus tamacuarensis is a species of frog in the family Aromobatidae. It is found in the Sierra Tapirapecó in the Amazonas state of Venezuela as well as in the adjacent Amazonas state of Brazil (where the range is known as Serra do Tapirapecó).

Records of Anomaloglossus tamacuarensis near the border between Venezuela and Brazil.

== Etymology ==
The specific name tamacuarensis refers to the type locality, Pico Tamacuari in the Sierra Tapirapecó.

== Description ==
The type series consists of two adult males, two adult females, and four juveniles. The males measure 21.4 and 22.4 mm (0.84 and 0.88 in), the females 24.8 and 25 mm (0.98 and 0.98 in), and the juveniles 16.9–20 mm (0.67–0.79 in) in snout–vent length. The head is little wider than it is long. The tympanum is inconspicuous. The fingers have fringes but no webbing; the toes are moderately webbed. The dorsum is brown to yellowish brown with darker brown markings; dorsal skin is granular. There is a poorly defined, pale oblique lateral line. Males have gray throat, white-stippled chin, and pale dirty green or yellowish venter, where females have pale gray or silvery white throats and silvery white venters.

Anomaloglossus tamacuarensis resembles Anomaloglossus shrevei from the Duida-Marahuaca Massif.

== Habitat ==
This diurnal, terrestrial species is found in or near rocky forest streams. The Venezuelan type locality is at an elevation of about 1,160–1,200 m (3,810–3,940 ft) above sea level, whereas the Brazilian record is from 350 m (1,150 ft) asl. It is active both day and night. Males call from beneath large boulders.

The species has been found in protected parks in Venezuela and Brazil: Parima-Tapirapecó National Park, Alto Orinoco–Casiquiare Biosphere Reserve, Floresta Nacional do Amazonas, and Parque Estadual Serra do Aracá.

== Reproduction ==
Scientists believe this frog has young the same way other frogs in Anomaloglossus do: They believe female frog lays eggs on land. Scientists say the male frog carries the tadpoles to streams.

== Threats ==
The Venezuelan Fauna Red List classifies this frog as data deficient, and the IUCN Red List classifies it as least concern, largely because it inhabits pristine habitat far from where most humans go or build infrastructure. Climate change poses one possible threat to this species.
