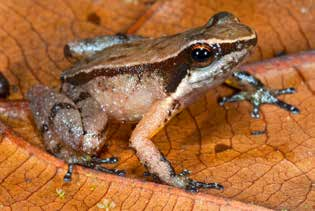
- Anomaloglossus praderioi from Maringma-tepui

Conservation status
- Endangered (IUCN 3.1)

Scientific classification
- Kingdom: Animalia
- Phylum: Chordata
- Class: Amphibia
- Order: Anura
- Family: Aromobatidae
- Genus: Anomaloglossus
- Species: A. praderioi

Binomial name
- Anomaloglossus praderioi (La Marca, 1997)

Synonyms
- Colostethus praderioi La Marca, 1997

= Anomaloglossus praderioi =

Species of frog

Anomaloglossus praderioi is a species of frog in the family Aromobatidae. It is found in the Pantepui region of southeastern Venezuela and western Guyana. More specifically, this frog is known from Mount Roraima (its type locality; Venezuela/Guyana), Sierra de Lema in Venezuela, and Maringma-tepui in Guyana. Its actual range is probably wider and might reach into northern Brazil.

== Description ==
Anomaloglossus praderioi are relatively small frogs, though medium-sized among Anomaloglossus: males measure 20–22 mm (0.79–0.87 in) in snout–vent length and a single female 23 mm (0.91 in). It has a robust body with shagreened to finely granular (more granular posteriorly) skin in the dorsum. Tadpoles are up to 27 mm (1.1 in) in length (Gosner stage 31) and dark brown to black in colour; they are of benthic feeder ecomorphological type.

The male advertisement call consists of long trains of a single note repeated at a rate of 61–76 notes/min.

== Habitat and conservation ==
Anomaloglossus praderioi occurs in montane medium-canopy forest at elevations between 1,310–1,950 m (4,300–6,400 ft) asl. Specimens have been found on rocks covered by mosses and on moist soils, in areas with very low light intensity and abundant decaying vegetation.

Anomaloglossus praderioi was assessed as "data deficient" in 2004, when it was only known from its type locality. In view that it is now known to have a wider distribution, it could now be classified as "Endangered". It occurs in the Canaima National Park in Venezuela and the Kaieteur National Park in Guyana.

== Reproduction ==
Scientists have not reported oviposition but they infer that this lays eggs on land. Scientists observed one male frog carrying five tadpoles on his back. They believe the tadpoles develop in small temporary pools.
