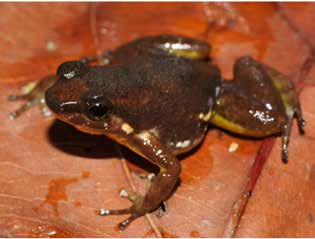
- Female Anomaloglossus wothuja

Conservation status
- Least Concern (IUCN 3.1)

Scientific classification
- Kingdom: Animalia
- Phylum: Chordata
- Class: Amphibia
- Order: Anura
- Family: Aromobatidae
- Genus: Anomaloglossus
- Species: A. wothuja

Binomial name
- Anomaloglossus wothuja (Barrio-Amorós, Fuentes-Ramos, and Rivas-Fuenmayor, 2004)
- A. wothuja is only known from a locality in the Amazonas state, Venezuela

Synonyms
- Colostethus wothuja Barrio-Amorós, Fuentes-Ramos, and Rivas-Fuenmayor, 2004

= Anomaloglossus wothuja =

Species of frog

Anomaloglossus wothuja is a species of frog in the family Aromobatidae. It is endemic to Venezuela and is only known from its type locality, the base of Cerro Sipapo, in the Amazonas state. It appears to be endemic to the Cerro Cuao massif but might occur more widely in similar granitic areas.

== Etymology ==
The specific name wothuja refers to the Piaroa people who live in the area of the type locality.

== Taxonomy and systematics ==
Anomaloglossus verbeeksnyderorum Barrio-Amorós, Santos, and Jovanovic, 2010 is not genetically distinct from Anomaloglossus wothuja, but these species show subtle morphological differences. Establishing the distinctness of these taxa needs further work.

== Description ==
The only adult male in the type series measures 20 mm (0.8 in), whereas three adult females are slightly larger, 21–22 mm (0.8–0.9 in) in snout–vent length. The snout sloping, pointed in profile, and nearly truncate in both dorsal and ventral profile. The tympanum is distinct but partly concealed by the supratympanic fold. The fingers bear small terminal discs and keel-like fringes. The toes have fringes and are partially webbed. Dorsal coloration is dark brown, with black flanks and a white, oblique lateral stripe. There is a bright white spot below tympanic area. The axilla is white. Throat, chest and belly yellowish, lower arms, and hind limbs are greyish. Some finger discs are white. The upper lip is dirty white. The iris is bronze.

The male was found carrying two tadpoles in Gosner stage 25 on its back. Tadpoles collected from a small pool beside a stream were of Gosner stages 31–40. The Gosner stage 40 tadpole measured 28 mm (1.1 in) in total length, including the 11 mm (0.4 in) body.

== Habitat and conservation ==
Anomaloglossus wothuja is known from medium to tall evergreen forest at elevations of 150–200 m (490–660 ft) above sea level. Individuals were found on large rocks on the bank of a stream. Tadpoles were collected from the back of a male, and from a small pool beside a stream. It is diurnal.

Threats to this species are unknown. It is not known to occur in any protected areas.
