= Anomaloglossus blanci =

Conservation status
- Endangered (IUCN 3.1)

Scientific classification
- Kingdom: Animalia
- Phylum: Chordata
- Class: Amphibia
- Order: Anura
- Family: Aromobatidae
- Genus: Anomaloglossus
- Species: A. blanci

Binomial name
- Anomaloglossus blanci Fouquet, Vacher, Courtois, Villette, Reizine, Gaucher, Jairam, Ouboter, and Kok, 2018

Species of frog

Anomaloglossus blanci is a species of frog in the family Aromobatidae. It is endemic to French Guiana, where it inhabits rocky and sandy streams. It is a small frog measuring 15.9–18.8 mm (0.63–0.74 in) long in males and 17.9 mm (0.70 in) in females. Adult males have brownish to reddish-brown back with dark brown splotches and dark brown to light grey flanks. The underside is tricolored, with black on the throat, blue-and-white-flecked grey upper bellies, and orange on the underside of the limbs and the remainder of the belly. It is classified as being endangered by the IUCN.

== Taxonomy ==
Specimens of Anomaloglossus blanci had historically been assigned to A. degranvillei, a species that was described in 1975 from a number of localities spread throughout French Guiana. A 2017 study of the complex found that the French Guianan populations traditionally assigned to A. degranvillei were deeply divergent, with only populations from some central French Guianan mountains belonging to A. degranvillei proper.

Anomaloglossus blanci was formally described in 2018 based on an adult male specimen from French Guiana. The species is named after the herpetologist Michel Blanc, who has worked extensively in French Guiana.

== Description ==
Anomaloglossus blanci is a small frog measuring 15.9–18.8 mm (0.63–0.74 in) long in males and 17.9 mm (0.70 in) in females. Adult males have brownish to reddish-brown back with dark brown splotches and dark brown to light grey flanks. There is a black stripe running down the sides from the snout to the flanks. The underside is tricolored, with black on the throat, blue-and-white-flecked grey upper bellies, and orange on the underside of the limbs and the remainder of the belly. Males seem to have more intense colors while vocalizing to attract male and become duller while raising tadpoles.

== Distribution and ecology ==
This frog lives in rocky and sandy streams, often near larger tributaries, in French Guiana. Scientists observed it between 50 and 200 meters above sea level. Scientists note that the frog lives in one protected place: Parc Amazonien de Guyane. The males sit near streams and call to the female frogs, with activity greatest after dawn and near dusk. After the eggs hatch, the male frogs carry the tadpoles to streams. Tadpoles require parental care to complete maturing after hatching and die within hours if they are removed from the male's back. The species raises one to four tadpoles at once, although it can mate again while raising a clutch of tadpoles.

== Conservation ==
The IUCN classifies this frog as being endangered. Scientists infer that the principal threat is chytridiomycosis. Although they have not seen the fungus Batrachochytrium dendrobatidis on the frog, the frog's decline mirrors that of other amphibians in French Guiana killed by chytridiomycosis.
