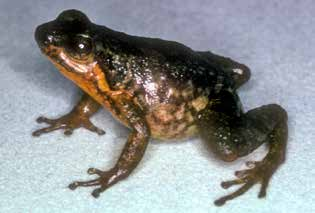
- Female paratype

Conservation status
- Data Deficient (IUCN 3.1)

Scientific classification
- Kingdom: Animalia
- Phylum: Chordata
- Class: Amphibia
- Order: Anura
- Family: Aromobatidae
- Genus: Anomaloglossus
- Species: A. parkerae

Binomial name
- Anomaloglossus parkerae (Meinhardt and Parmalee, 1996)
- A. parkerae is only known from the La Escalera in the Bolívar state, Venezuela

Synonyms
- Colostethus parkerae Meinhardt and Parmalee, 1996

= Anomaloglossus parkerae =

Species of frog

Anomaloglossus parkerae is a species of frog in the family Aromobatidae. As currently known, it is endemic to Venezuela and is only known from near its type locality in the La Escalera, the Bolívar state, Venezuela, near the Guyanese border. However, its range is expected to extend southward to the Gran Sabana as well as into the adjacent Guyana. The specific name parkerae honors Dr. Nancy Parker, undergraduate adviser of one of the scientists who described the species.

== Description ==
Adult males, based on the holotype that is the only male specimen in the type series, measure about 19 mm (0.7 in) and adult females 23–24 mm (0.9–0.9 in) in snout–vent length. The overall appearance is robust. The snout is bluntly rounded in dorsal view and posteroventrally inclined in profile. The tympanum is not visible in the male but is visible in the females. Supra-tympanic fold is absent. Forelimbs are long and slender. The finger tips have expanded discs; no webbing is present. The hind limbs are robust. The toes are webbed and bear lateral fringes as well as terminal discs. Skin is smooth. The dorsum is grayish tan with olive brown markings. The throat is orange yellow while the rest of the venter is creamy yellow. The iris is pale bronze.

== Habitat and conservation ==
Anomaloglossus parkerae occurs in the tropical montane forests of Sierra de Lema at elevations of 860–1,300 m (2,820–4,270 ft) above sea level. It is diurnal. Specimens have been found in a muddy roadside ditch and on the rocky banks of rivers. Tadpoles believed to be of this species have been found in shallow puddles (5–10 cm (2–4 in) deep) and in small streams and under rocks in small pools in a roadside ditch. Adults forage on insects such as ants, beetles, termites, and dipterans, and on isopods.

Anomaloglossus parkerae is potentially threatened by habitat loss caused by construction of power lines and the associated access roads that results in deforestation, and by tourism. Its population status is unknown but it is thought to be common and protected by Canaima National Park.
