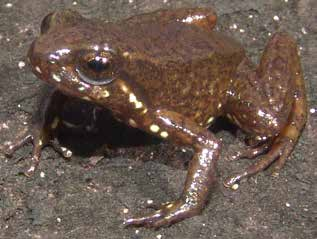

Conservation status
- Near Threatened (IUCN 3.1)
- CITES Appendix II

Scientific classification
- Kingdom: Animalia
- Phylum: Chordata
- Class: Amphibia
- Order: Anura
- Family: Aromobatidae
- Genus: Anomaloglossus
- Species: A. rufulus

Binomial name
- Anomaloglossus rufulus (Gorzula, 1990)
- Anomaloglossus rufulus is endemic to the Chimantá Massif in Venezuela.

Synonyms
- Dendrobates rufulus Gorzula, 1990 "1988"; Epipedobates rufulus (Gorzula, 1990); Allobates rufulus (Gorzula, 1990)

= Anomaloglossus rufulus =

Species of amphibian

Anomaloglossus rufulus (common names: Sira poison frog, Chimantá poison frog, tepui poison frog) is a species of frog in the family Aromobatidae. It is endemic to Venezuela where it is known from a few tepuis in the Chimantá Massif in the Bolívar state.

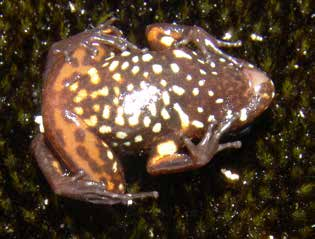
Ventral view of Anomaloglossus rufulus

== Description ==
Males measure 20.4–22.4 mm (0.80–0.88 in) and females, based on the only known specimen, 23.4 mm (0.92 in) in snout–vent length. The head is slightly longer than it is wide. The tympanum is barely visible in some specimens but distinct in others. Skin is shagreened. The dorsum is chocolate brown and patternless apart from small irregular dark brown spots. The upper lip has four small irregular white spots. The ventrum has dark brown background with white or whitish spots and small dark spots.

== Habitat ==
It occurs in high montane environments at elevations between 2,100–2,600 m (6,900–8,500 ft) above sea level, on the tops of tepuis. The female holotype was collected in a Bonnetia forest, while calling males have been found in crevices and inaccessible walls, usually in muddy soil among patches of vegetation consisting of, e.g., Brocchinia tatei. Tadpoles probably belonging to this species has been found in creeks with acidic water.

The range of this species is within the Canaima National Park.

== Threats ==
Both the IUCN and Venezuelan Fauna Red List classify this frog as near threatened. Climate change could harm this frog by impacting its reproductive success. Human-caused fires can damage its habitat. The frog may also be threatened by emerging diseases, bacterial, viral, and fungal.
