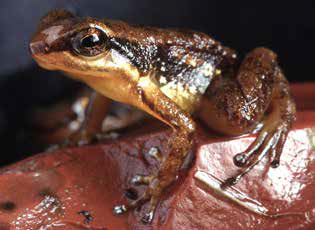
- Female holotype

Conservation status
- Near Threatened (IUCN 3.1)

Scientific classification
- Kingdom: Animalia
- Phylum: Chordata
- Class: Amphibia
- Order: Anura
- Family: Aromobatidae
- Genus: Anomaloglossus
- Species: A. breweri

Binomial name
- Anomaloglossus breweri (Barrio-Amorós, 2006)
- A. breweri is only known from its type locality, Aprada-tepui in Venezuela

Synonyms
- Colostethus breweri Barrio-Amorós, 2006

= Anomaloglossus breweri =

Species of amphibian

Anomaloglossus breweri is a species of frogs in the family Aromobatidae. It is only known from its type locality, Aprada-tepui in the Bolívar state of southeastern Venezuela. This species was discovered by scientists exploring the inaccessible and remote region of Aprada-tepui. It is a fast-moving frog that lives along creeks and in quiet pools along small streams along the slopes near the cave. The frog is named for Charles Brewer-Carías who collected the type series.

== Description ==
The distinctive features of this species are its particular skin pattern, absence of fringes on fingers, moderate toe webbing, tongue characteristics, and yellow and orange coloration on its undersides. The type series consists of one female (the holotype), two males, and one unsexed juvenile. The female measures 24 mm (0.9 in) and the larger male 21 mm (0.8 in) in snout–vent length.

== Habitat and conservation ==
Anomaloglossus breweri is only known from a collapsed steep gorge on the northwestern slope of the tepui at an elevation of 660 m (2,170 ft) above sea level. It is probably more widespread on the tepui, and perhaps in the surrounding areas. The specimens were found along creeks and in quiet pools along small streams.

Aprada-tepui is located within the boundaries of the Canaima National Park. This species could still be threatened because of its small range, making it sensitive to catastrophic events. The species is also vulnerable to emerging bacterial, fungal, and viral diseases.
