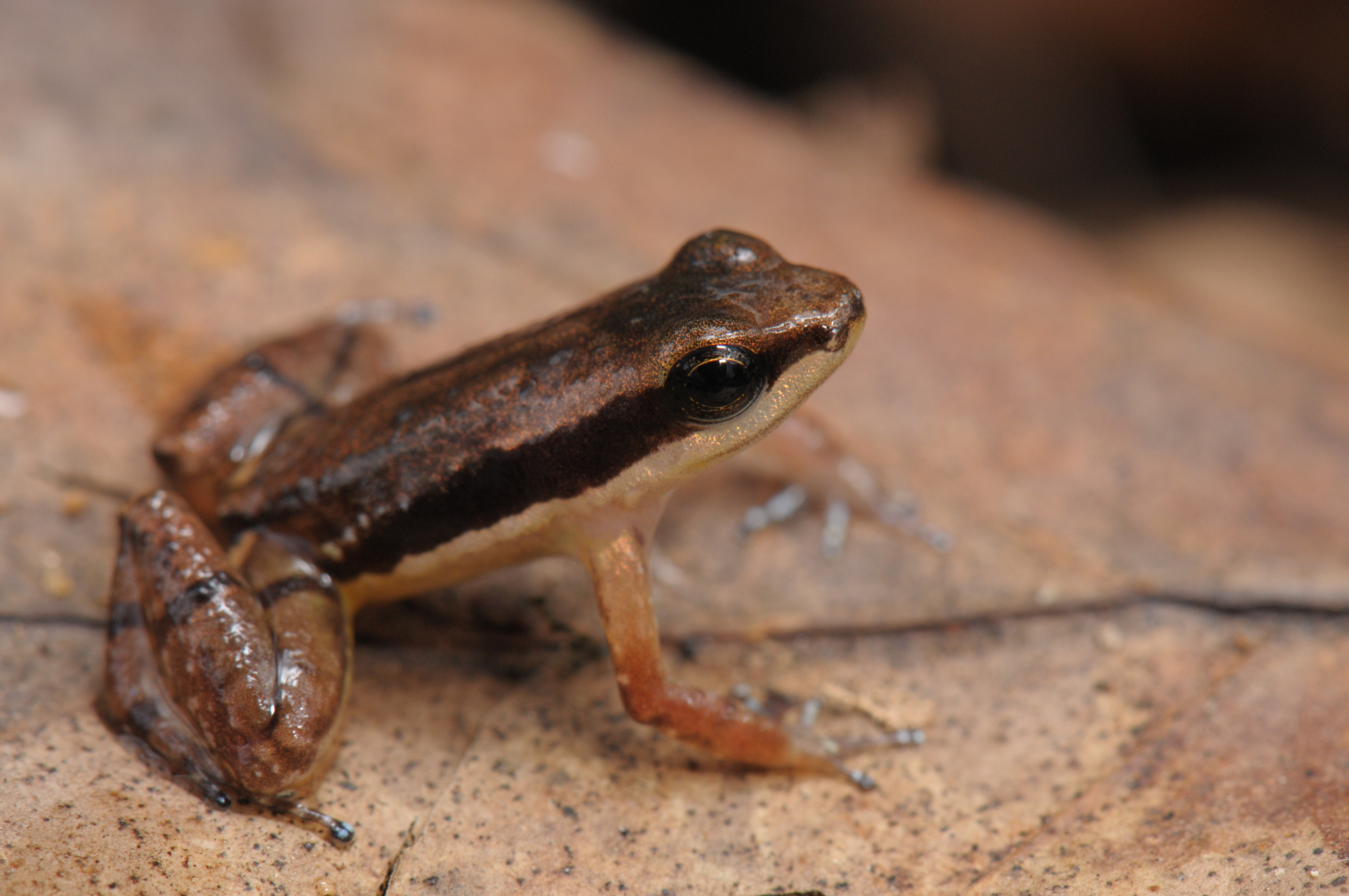
- Rio rocket frog (Dryadobates olfersioides)

Scientific classification
- Kingdom: Animalia
- Phylum: Chordata
- Class: Amphibia
- Order: Anura
- Family: Aromobatidae
- Subfamily: Allobatinae
- Genus: Dryadobates; Grant, Lyra, Hofreiter, Preick, Barlow, Verdade, and Rodrigues, 2025

Type species
- Dryadobates bokermanni Grant et al. 2025

Species
- 7, see text

= Dryadobates =

Genus of amphibians

Deryadobates, with member species commonly referred to as the Atlantic Forest nurse frogs, is a genus of frogs in the family Aromobatidae. The species of this genus are endemic to the Atlantic coastal plain of Brazil. This genus was split from, and is currently maintained as a sister taxon of Allobates.

== Taxonomy ==
There are, as of 2026, seven members of this genus:

- Dryadobates alagoanus (Bokermann, 1967)
- Dryadobates bokermanni Grant, Lyra, Hofreiter, Preick, Barlow, Verdade, and Rodrigues, 2025
- Dryadobates capixaba (Bokermann, 1967)
- Dryadobates carioca (Bokermann, 1967)
- †Dryadobates erythropus Grant and Pinheiro, 2025
- Dryadobates lutzi Grant, Lyra, Hofreiter, Preick, Barlow, Verdade, and Rodrigues, 2025
- Rio rocket frog (Dryadobates olfersioides) (Lutz, 1925)
