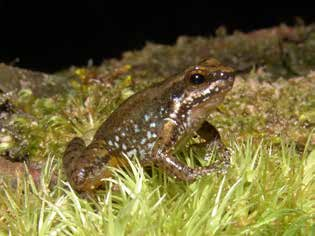

Conservation status
- Data Deficient (IUCN 3.1)

Scientific classification
- Kingdom: Animalia
- Phylum: Chordata
- Class: Amphibia
- Order: Anura
- Family: Aromobatidae
- Genus: Anomaloglossus
- Species: A. tepuyensis

Binomial name
- Anomaloglossus tepuyensis (La Marca, 1997)

Synonyms
- Colostethus tepuyensis La Marca, 1997 "1996"

= Anomaloglossus tepuyensis =

Species of frog

Anomaloglossus tepuyensis is a species of frog in the family Aromobatidae. It is found in southeastern Venezuela (Auyán-tepui region, its type locality, and Mount Roraima) and western Guyana (Mount Ayanganna region).

== Description ==
Adult males measure 21–24 mm (0.8–0.9 in) and adult females 24–28 mm (0.9–1.1 in) in snout–vent length. The snout is sloping and rounded to bluntly pointed in profile, truncate to broadly rounded or bluntly pointed in dorsal and ventral view. The tympanum is usually inconspicuous and is concealed postero-dorsally by a diffuse supra-tympanic bulge. The fingers have keel-like lateral folds and moderately expanded discs. The toes are moderately webbed and have folded, flap-like fringing. The discs are moderately expanded (the first toe may have weakly expanded disc). The dorsum has grayish brown to orangish brown and bronzy brown ground color and has irregularly pigmented dark brown or blackish brown markings. The latter are usually include a dark inter-orbital bar, a V-shaped to cordiform median dark blotch between arms, a transverse pair of smaller para-vertebral blotches at the midbody, and usually a single, small median posterior blotch. An incomplete pale brown to blue oblique lateral line may be present. Forearms and hind legs brown have distinct to vague dark bars or irregular spots.

The male advertisement call is a short train of 14–22 notes, sounding like a series of rapid "beeps".

== Habitat and conservation ==
Anomaloglossus tepuyensis inhabits tropical rainforests at elevations of 390–1,850 m (1,280–6,070 ft) above sea level. Males call in the margins of small streams in the forest or near waterfalls in the spray-zone. The eggs are laid on land. The tadpoles are carried to water by the adults, where the development is completed. Threats to this species are unknown. It occurs in the Canaima National Park.
