= Anomaloglossus surinamensis =

Conservation status
- Least Concern (IUCN 3.1)

Scientific classification
- Kingdom: Animalia
- Phylum: Chordata
- Class: Amphibia
- Order: Anura
- Family: Aromobatidae
- Genus: Anomaloglossus
- Species: A. surinamensis

Binomial name
- Anomaloglossus surinamensis Ouboter & Jairam, 2012

Species of frog

Anomaloglossus surinamensis, commonly known as the Suriname rocket frog or Surinaamse dwerggifkikker, is a species of frog in the family Aromobatidae. It is native to Suriname and French Guiana.

== Range and habitat ==
Anomaloglossus surinamensis is known only from Suriname (Brownsberg Mountain, Tafelberg Mountain, the Bakhuis Mountains, and the Nassau Mountains) and French Guiana, but may also occur in Brazil. It is found in leaf litter near small brooks located in mountainous primary forests at 0–600 m (0–1,969 ft) above sea level.

Scientists have observed the frog in two protected areas: Kaw Natural Reserve and Nouragura Reserve.

== Description ==
Adult Anomaloglossus surinamensis frogs are small and stout-bodied, growing up to 17 mm (0.67 in) long. The skin on the dorsum has a rough texture, while the underside is smooth. The eyes are relatively large and the snout is blunt. The fingers are short, with the first finger longer than the second. Only the first and second toes are entirely webbed – the webbing between other toes is less developed. The dorsum is light to dark brown in colour. A dark band runs down the side of the body, starting at the snout, with a line branching off from behind the eye towards the forelegs. The underside is white with small melanophores. The area around the anus is black with a white border.

== Conservation status ==
Anomaloglossus surinamensis is listed as least concern on the International Union for the Conservation of Nature's Red List due to its wide range and presumed large population. This species can be locally abundant and is known to occur in protected areas, but the population is believed to be fragmented. Its habitat may be threatened by climate change and illegal gold mining. While infection of A. surinamensis has not been directly observed, the chytridiomycosis-causing bacteria Batrachochytrium dendrobatidis is prevalent in French Guiana and may pose a threat.
