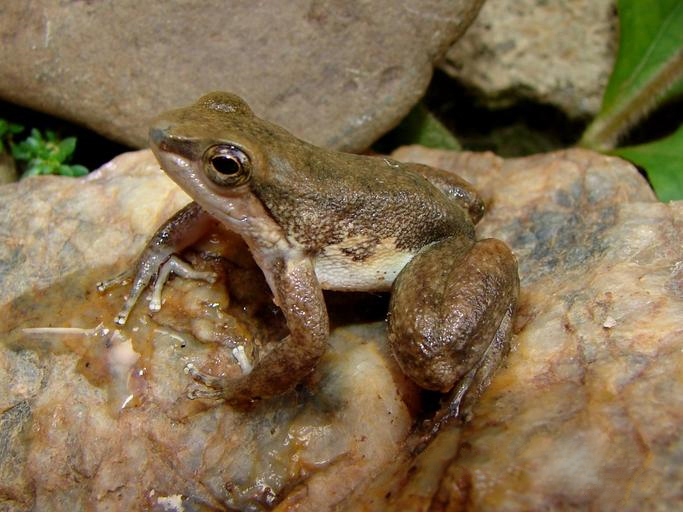
- Rheobates palmatus

Scientific classification
- Kingdom: Animalia
- Phylum: Chordata
- Class: Amphibia
- Order: Anura
- Family: Aromobatidae
- Subfamily: Anomaloglossinae
- Genus: Rheobates; Grant, Frost, Caldwell, Gagliardo, Haddad, Kok, Means, Noonan, Schargel, and Wheeler, 2006

Type species
- Phyllobates palmatus Werner, 1899

Diversity
- 2 species (see text)

= Rheobates =

Genus of amphibians

Rheobates is a genus of frogs in the family Aromobatidae. It is endemic to Colombia. These are cryptically coloured frogs with extensive toe webbing. The name Rheobates is derived from the Greek words rheo (stream, current) and βάτης bátēs (a walker), in reference to the riparian habitat of the type species Rheobates palmatus. They are associated with streams in sub-Andean forests and foothills of the Andes at low to medium altitudes.

== Species ==
There are currently two species:

- Rheobates palmatus (Werner, 1899)
- Rheobates pseudopalmatus (Rivero and Serna, 2000)

The validity of Rheobates pseudopalmatus has been questioned, whereas Rheobates palmatus may represent a species complex.
