= Anomaloglossus guanayensis =

Conservation status
- Near Threatened (IUCN 3.1)

Scientific classification
- Kingdom: Animalia
- Phylum: Chordata
- Class: Amphibia
- Order: Anura
- Family: Aromobatidae
- Genus: Anomaloglossus
- Species: A. guanayensis

Binomial name
- Anomaloglossus guanayensis (La Marca, 1997)

Synonyms
- Colostethus guanayensis La Marca, 1997

Species of frog

Anomaloglossus guanayensis is a species of frog in the family Aromobatidae. It is endemic to Venezuela where it is only known from the Serranía de Guanay in the Bolívar state of southeastern Venezuela. It is a common frog and is thought to have wider distribution.

== Habitat ==
This diurnal frog is found in tropical rainforest and it is known from its type locality, Serranía de Guanay, between 1650 and 1800 meters above sea level.

Scientists saw this frog inside Monumento Natural Cerro Guanay, a protected area. Scientists infer that the tadpoles develop in streams.

== Reproduction ==
Males were found calling from shaded spots along a rocky stream.

== Threats ==
The IUCN classifies this frog as near threatened. Climate change poses some threat through its threat to the plants in the frog's habitat. Emerging diseases caused by viruses, bacteria, and fungi could also hurt this frog.
