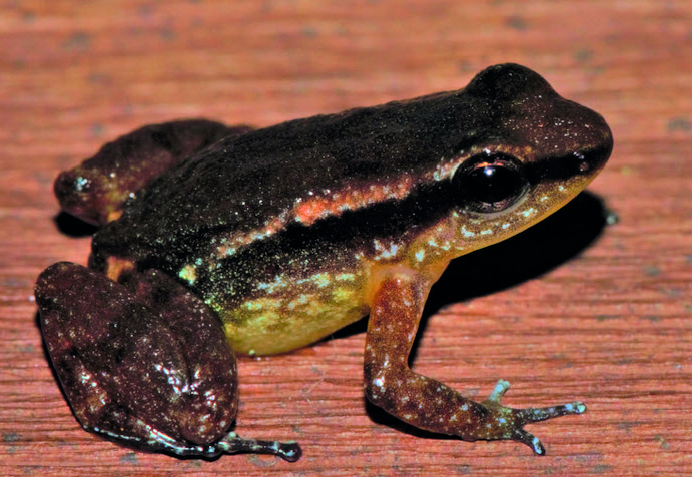
- Amapá, Brazil

Conservation status
- Least Concern (IUCN 3.1)

Scientific classification
- Kingdom: Animalia
- Phylum: Chordata
- Class: Amphibia
- Order: Anura
- Family: Aromobatidae
- Genus: Anomaloglossus
- Species: A. baeobatrachus

Binomial name
- Anomaloglossus baeobatrachus (Boistel & de Massary, 1999)

Synonyms
- Colostethus baeobatrachus Boistel & de Massary, 1999

= Anomaloglossus baeobatrachus =

Species of frog

Anomaloglossus baeobatrachus is a species of frog in the family Aromobatidae. It is found in northern Brazil south to Manaus, French Guiana, Suriname, and Guyana.

== Habitat ==
This diurnal frog is found on the leaf litter in primary and secondary forest between 10 and 800 meters above sea level. It seems to prefer slopes and plateaus, but it can be found near almost any type of body of water.

== Reproduction ==
The male frogs form groups of two or more and perch on leaves or branches a little above the leaf litter when they call to the females. The female frog lays eggs on dead leaves. The tadpoles grow in the nest.

== Conservation and threats ==
The IUCN classifies this frog as least concern of extinction. Its range is large and rarely visited by humans.

== Original description ==
- Boistel, R.; de Massary, J.C. (1999). "Les amphibiens veneneux de la famille des Dendrobatides". Le Courrier de la Nature: 34–39.
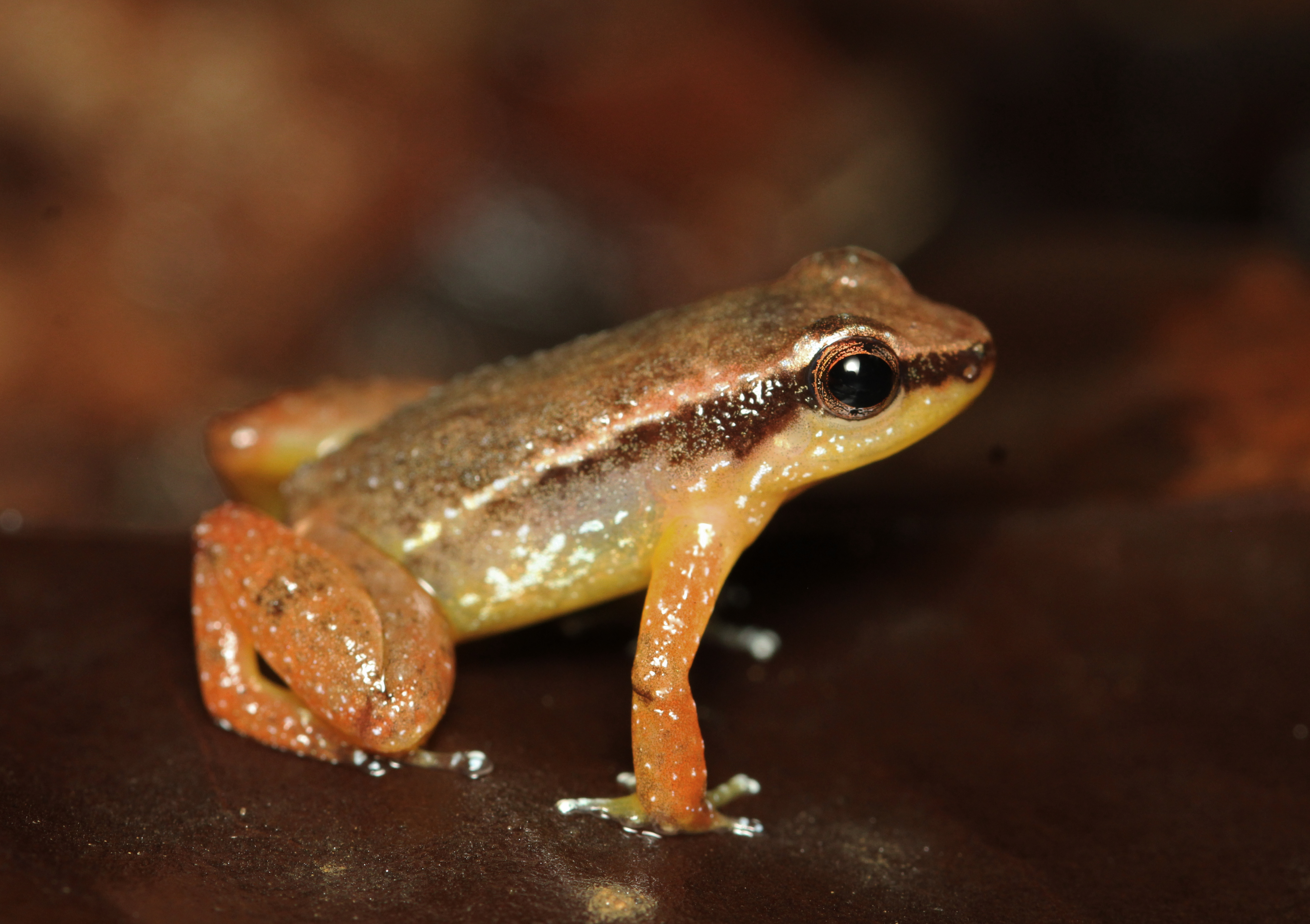

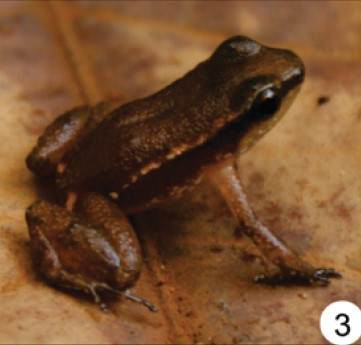
