= Dryadobates bokermanni =

Scientific classification
- Kingdom: Animalia
- Phylum: Chordata
- Class: Amphibia
- Order: Anura
- Family: Aromobatidae
- Genus: Dryadobates
- Species: D. bokermanni

Binomial name
- Dryadobates bokermanni Grant, Lyra, Hofreiter, Preick, Barlow, Verdade, and Rodrigues, 2025

Species of frog

Dryadobates bokermanni is a species of frog in the family Aromobatidae. It is endemic to the coastal forest regions of Bahia, Brazil.
