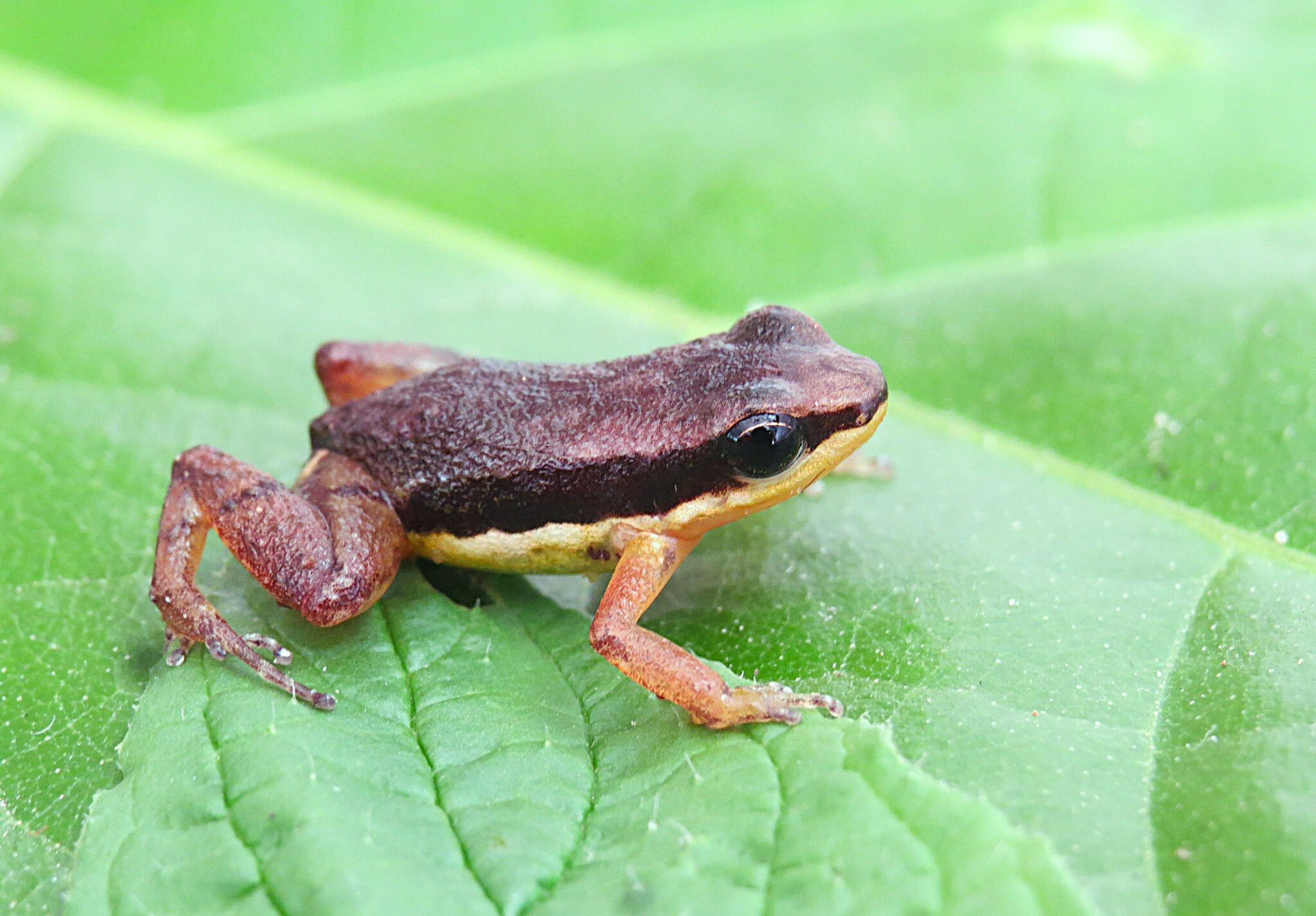

Scientific classification
- Kingdom: Animalia
- Phylum: Chordata
- Class: Amphibia
- Order: Anura
- Family: Aromobatidae
- Genus: Dryadobates
- Species: D. alagoanus

Binomial name
- Dryadobates alagoanus (Bokermann, 1967)

Synonyms
- Phyllobates alagoanus Bokermann, 1967; Colostethus alagoanus Edwards, 1971; Allobates alagoanus Grant, Frost, Caldwell, et al. 2006

= Dryadobates alagoanus =

Species of frog

Dryadobates alagoanus is a species of frog in the family Aromobatidae. It is endemic to the coastal forest regions of Brazil.

The species was formerly consigned to synonymy with Dryadobates olfersioides. Following genetic and morphometric analyses, it was re-elevated to species status in 2025.
