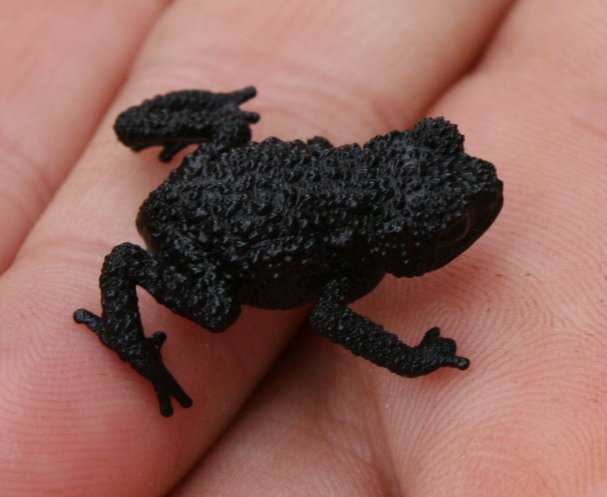

Conservation status
- Endangered (IUCN 3.1)

Scientific classification
- Kingdom: Animalia
- Phylum: Chordata
- Class: Amphibia
- Order: Anura
- Family: Aromobatidae
- Genus: Anomaloglossus
- Species: A. roraima

Binomial name
- Anomaloglossus roraima (La Marca, 1997)

Synonyms
- Colostethus roraima La Marca, 1997

= Anomaloglossus roraima =

Species of frog

Anomaloglossus roraima is a species of frog in the family Aromobatidae. It is found on the tepui of southeastern Venezuela and western Guyana; it is expected to be found in the nearby Brazil. Its type locality is Mount Roraima. It mainly inhabits large bromeliads in tepui scrub and high-tepui meadows at elevations between 1,860–2,700 m (6,100–8,860 ft) asl. The population status is thought to be rare and threatened by disturbance by tourists. The species occurs in Canaima National Park.

== Body ==
The adult male frog measures about 16.5–19.0 mm in snout-vent length and the adult females frog about 16.5–19.3 mm. The skin of the dorsum is tan or light brown in color, sometimes with darker marks and mottling in no particular shape or pattern. The upper surfaces of all four legs are lighter in color with small white dots, sometimes with dark bars. The bottoms of the legs are darker. The flanks can have darker colors. The belly is yellow or reddish in color, sometimes with dark brown marks. The ends of the toes can have blue color. The iris of the eye is rusty brown in color on top and darker in the middle and light rusty brown on the bottom.

== Habitat ==
This frog lives high on the tepui flatlands. It lives in large bromeliad plants, such as Brocchinia tatei. Scientists observed the frog between 1800 and 2700 meters above sea level.

Scientists have seen this frog in one protected park: Canaima National Park.

== Reproduction ==
The male frog calls to the female frogs during the day, especially misty days. The tadpoles develop in water in the bromeliad plants.

== Threats ==
The IUCN classifies this frog as endangered. Most of the frogs live high on the tepui flatland, but human-set fires can reach that high. Climate change poses some threat to this frog because there are no higher, cooler elevations to which it may migrate.
