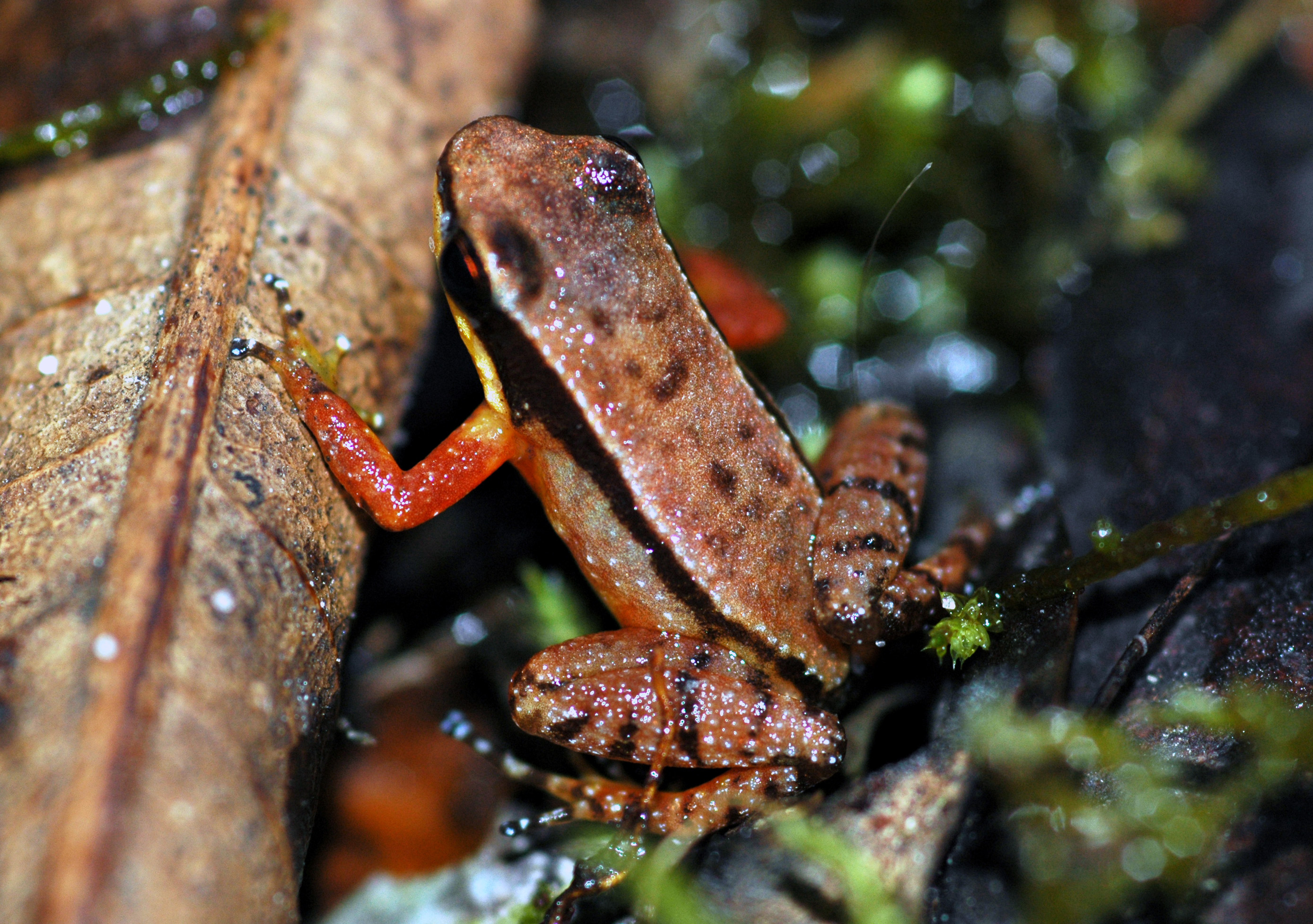

Conservation status
- Endangered (IUCN 3.1)

Scientific classification
- Kingdom: Animalia
- Phylum: Chordata
- Class: Amphibia
- Order: Anura
- Family: Aromobatidae
- Genus: Anomaloglossus
- Species: A. kaiei

Binomial name
- Anomaloglossus kaiei Kok, Sambhu, Roopsind, Lenglet, and Bourne, 2006)

Synonyms
- Colostethus kaiei

= Anomaloglossus kaiei =

Species of amphibian

Anomaloglossus kaiei is a species of frogs in the family Aromobatidae, commonly known as the Kaie rock frog. It was named in honor of Kaie, a great Chieftain of the Patamona tribe, who sacrificed himself to the Great Spirit Makonaima by canoeing over the Kaieteur falls in order to save his own people. It is endemic to Guyana where it is known from the Kaieteur National Park and the Pacaraima Mountains. However, as it is found along the Guyana–Brazil border, it is also possibly present in Brazil. This frog shows maternal care: female frogs can provide tadpoles with trophic eggs.

== Description ==
A. kaiei displays cryptic coloration. Their dorsal ground color is medium brown, with a wide black band running laterally from its snout tip around the body and a thin, white, partially-interrupted dorsolateral stripe situated immediately above the black band. The frog's upper lip bar, chin, and flank are a dirty white color, with a few white or light blue dots speckled throughout. Its iris is a metallic reddish bronze. Fingers I and II are equal in length when appressed, and Finger IV reaches the distal subarticular tubercle on Finger III when appressed. There is moderate webbing between the toes and lateral fringes on the fingertips. It has a median lingual process shared by other related species found throughout the Guiana Shield, but no oblique lateral stripe, ventrolateral stripe, black armband, or cloacal tubercles.

Adult males have an average snout-vent length of 18.9 mm (0.74 in) and all fingers are slightly swollen. Their throats are a light grayish-pink, with dark spotting to stippling that extends down to their chest that never completely covers their throat. Their stomachs are a whitish color with sparse dark stippling. Testis are white, unpigmented.

Adult females have an average snout-vent length of 19.8 mm (0.78 in). Their throats are a pure yellow. Their stomachs are orangish-yellow and absent of melanophores.

Tadpoles are dark brown to near-black on their body and the top of their head. Their lateral head appears as light purple. In fact, this region is transparent; the purple coloration is a result of visible blood vessels in the skin. Its posterior body is gray and significantly mottled with dark brown coloration. Fins are transparent.

After being kept in preservative for 2 months, most of the frog's coloration changes to a grayish brown and ventral areas become white. Black bands and spots remain visible.

== Habitat and distribution ==
A. kaiei has only been reported from Guyana in the Kaieteur National Park, but is found throughout the Pakaraima Mountains in the Guiana Shield in South America. This species lives mainly in primary forest but can also tolerate disturbed forest. Their distribution is commonly found at ranges between 150 and 450 m (490 and 1,480 ft) above sea level, but has also been found up to 1,060 m (3,480 ft) above sea level. A. kaiei is not a migrant species and is native to the Guiana Shield.

=== Conservation ===
The most significant threat posed to A. kaiei and its habitat are gold and diamond mining and quarrying, which occurs within Kaieteur National Park and threatens the ecosystem. The IUCN assessed A. kaiei last in November 2017 and rates this species as endangered with a stable population trend. As of date, there have been no significant reported conservation efforts undertaken for the preservation of this species.

== Speciation and phylogeny ==
Originally classified as Colostethus kaiei which is now a basionym, A. kaiei is most closely related to A. beebei, A. roraima, and A. praderoi. This species lives sympatrically with A. beebei throughout Kaieteur National Park and related areas; the two species share a last common ancestor 6–12 million years ago.

== Home range and territoriality ==
A. kaiei frogs are diurnal and terrestrial, not limited to areas near and surrounding bodies of water. Males are territorial and defend territories for several weeks at a time to attract mates. Their territories are found on the forest floor and spatially distinct from reproductive habitats.

== Calls ==
A. kaiei males call at an average dominant frequency of 4.85 kHz and an average pulse rate of 7.21 pulses per second, described as cricket-like chirps. Their calls have an average note duration of 31.69 ms, average intranote duration of 106.92 ms, and average internote duration of 923.15 ms. One study found the mean number of calls in 1 minute produced by A. kaiei as 74, with a range of 49–101. Due to the sympatric relation with A. beebei, the pulse rate and dominant frequency of A. kaiei calls have been suggested to pose a limitation on selection pressures for the calls of A. beebei, as selection should tend towards signal divergence for closely related sympatric species.

Males exhibit 3 distinct call types: advertisement calls, described as a series of 1–2 short pulses; aggressive calls, described as longer overall calls that initiate with a string of multiple rapid advertisement calls followed by a long train of pulses, and courtship calls. More recently, researchers identified a fourth type of call, the pseudo-aggressive call, which consists first of several rapid advertisement calls, followed by a 3-pulse call.

=== Absence of the "Dear Enemy" effect ===
Due to its sympatric and closely related relationship with A. beebei, A. kaiei has been studied alongside A. beebei to better understand the novel evolution of the "Dear Enemy" effect, which is the phenomenon where individuals of a given species react more aggressively to conspecific strangers than neighbors because strangers are more likely to pose as competitors for limited territorial resources than neighbors.

Both frogs share a number of calling and related behavioral properties. Their calls display similar patterns of within- and between-individual variation and provide similar amounts of identity-related information. Males of both species convey territory ownership through advertisement calls and respond using aggression to other nearby males also producing advertisement calls. Their aggressive behaviors follow similar patterns of escalation: males will first switch to aggressive calls, next engage in phonotaxis towards the nearby male, then engage in physical attacks through wrestling and chasing.

What distinguishes the two species's calling behavior is the presence of the Dear Enemy effect in A. beebei, whereas A. kaiei lacks such an effect. In fact, the presence of the Dear Enemy effect is a novel evolution, as equal reaction towards neighbors and strangers is both the common and ancestral state for Neotropical frogs. Given their similar calling properties, this divergence likely arose due to each species' distinct reproductive behaviors and resources. Compared to A. beebei, A. kaiei does not defend reproductive resources, are typically situated farther away from their neighbors, and defend territories for a significantly shorter amount of time mainly for the reason of attracting potential female mates. As such, A. kaiei males follow simpler rules that govern their aggressive behaviors by exhibiting similar rates and levels of aggression to neighbors and strangers alike as both pose equivalent competition for mates, by displaying generalized habituation of aggression with the accumulation of experience with male conspecifics, and by reducing aggression overall in areas with higher densities of male conspecifics. A. kaiei rear their offspring in pools of water distant from their territories, in contrast to A. beebei, whose territories include areas for rearing tadpoles and other reproductive resources. Additionally for A. beebei, strangers pose a greater threat because they represent competition for territories and reproductive resources, whereas neighbors already have established nearby territories and are thus less likely to present as competition.

== Diet ==
A. kaiei tadpoles mainly feed on detritus found in their habitat pools. This species is facultatively oophagous, with females delivering trophic eggs to their offspring that likely facilitates faster growth and development, which in turn lessens the potential of predation, risk of desiccation, and possibility for cannibalism. In fact, crabs have been commonly observed visiting pools containing tadpoles. There is little information currently available on the diet of adult A. kaiei frogs.

== Reproduction, mating, and parental care ==
A. kaiei males hold calling and mating territories on the forest floor for up to several weeks. Breeding activity is the most abundant during the rainy season, from May to July. Males were observed making advertisement calls for all studied months from April to August, with calling rates significantly greater in March and April, prior to the peak of breeding season.

As of date, there is a lack of information on the courtship behaviors and rituals, ovipositioning, and mating behaviors and positions of A. kaiei.

A. kaiei are terrestrial breeders, which is the ancestral state in the Aromobatidae family. Females deposit fertilized eggs on the underside of dead leaves on the forest floor in the calling territory of the male. Upon hatching into tadpoles, males are responsible for transporting the tadpoles from their calling territories to outside appropriate sites for rearing young, which are typically pools of water found on the forest floor or in the phytotelmata of bromeliad plants. It is not uncommon to find tadpoles of multiple fathers sharing the same pool of water.
