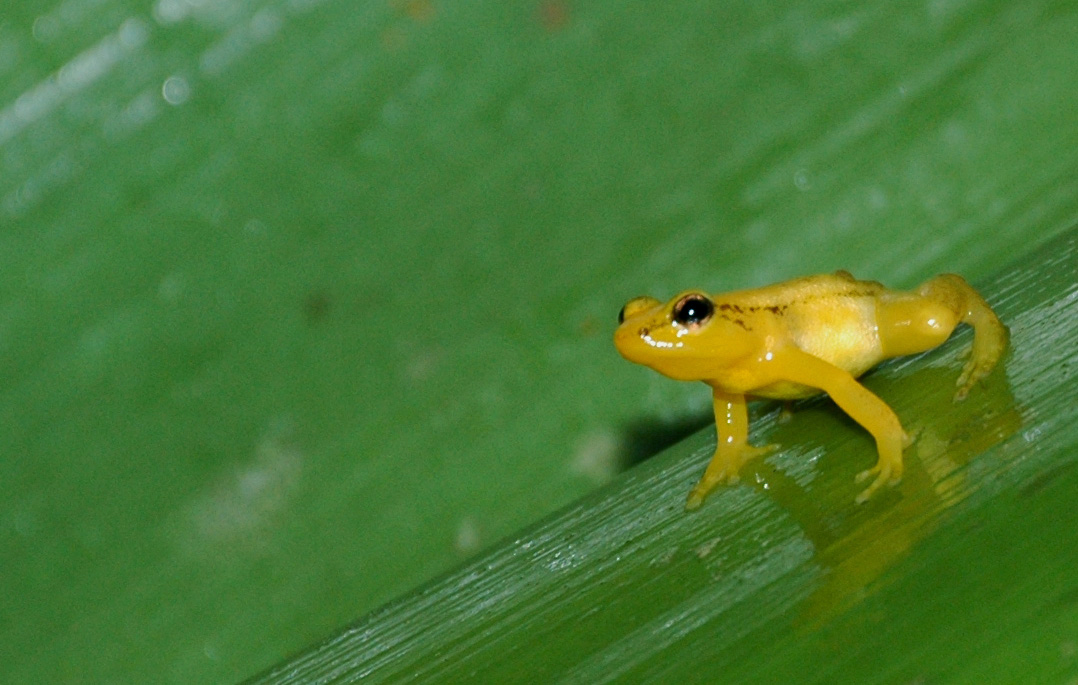
- Anomaloglossus beebei

Scientific classification
- Kingdom: Animalia
- Phylum: Chordata
- Class: Amphibia
- Order: Anura
- Family: Aromobatidae
- Subfamily: Anomaloglossinae
- Genus: Anomaloglossus; Grant, Frost, Caldwell, Gagliardo, Haddad, Kok, Means, Noonan, Schargel, and Wheeler, 2006

Type species
- Colostethus beebei Noble, 1923

Species
- 30 species (see text)

= Anomaloglossus =

Genus of amphibians

Anomaloglossus is a genus of frogs in the family Aromobatidae. The genus is endemic to the Guiana Shield in northern South America. It used to be placed in the family Dendrobatidae (together with other genera in the current Aromobatidae), and is still placed in that family by some sources. The name of the genus, from the Greek anomalos (=irregular, unusual) and glossa (=tongue), refers to the unusual tongue bearing the median lingual process, the only unambiguous phenotypic synapomorphy of this genus.

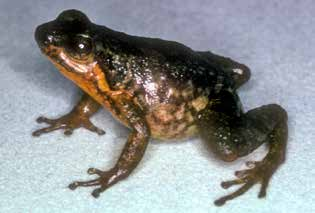
Female Anomaloglossus parkerae

== Description ==
Anomaloglossus are characterized by cryptic dorsal coloration (brown or gray). Dorsal skin is posteriorly granular. The toes are webbed, ranging from basal to extensive. The fingers have weakly expanded discs. Many species show large intraspecific morphological variability and lack of morphological characters that would allow easy species identification.

The tadpoles can be either exotrophic or endotrophic.

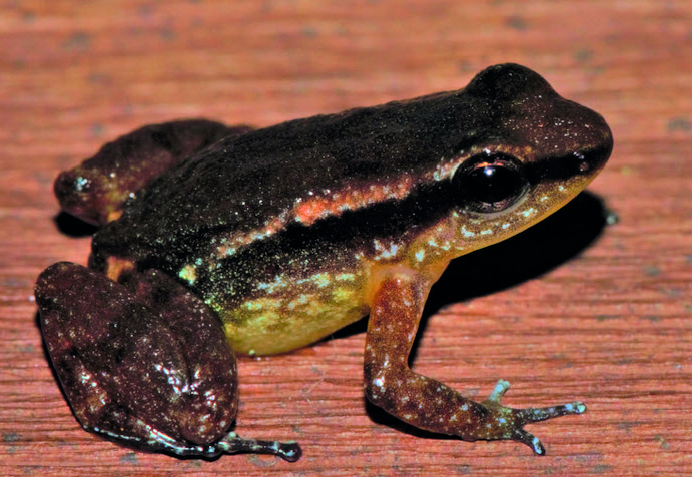
Anomaloglossus baeobatrachus

== Species ==
The following 30 species are recognised in the genus Anomaloglossus:

- Anomaloglossus apiau Fouquet, Souza, Nunes, Kok, Curcio, Carvalho, Grant, and Rodrigues, 2015
- Anomaloglossus ayarzaguenai (La Marca, 1997)
- Anomaloglossus baeobatrachus (Boistel and Massary, 1999)
- Anomaloglossus beebei (Noble, 1923)
- Anomaloglossus blanci Fouquet, Vacher, Courtois, Villette, Reizine, Gaucher, Jairam, Ouboter, and Kok, 2018
- Anomaloglossus breweri (Barrio-Amorós, 2006)
- Anomaloglossus degranvillei (Lescure, 1975)
- Anomaloglossus dewynteri Fouquet, Vacher, Courtois, Villette, Reizine, Gaucher, Jairam, Ouboter, and Kok, 2018
- Anomaloglossus guanayensis (La Marca, 1997)
- Anomaloglossus kaiei (Kok, Sambhu, Roopsind, Lenglet, and Bourne, 2006)
- Anomaloglossus leopardus Ouboter and Jairam, 2012
- Anomaloglossus meansi Kok, Nicolaï, Lathrop & MacCulloch, 2018
- Anomaloglossus megacephalus Kok, MacCulloch, Lathrop, Willaert, and Bossuyt, 2010
- Anomaloglossus mitaraka Fouquet, Vacher, Courtois, Deschamps, Ouboter, Jairam, Gaucher, Dubois, and Kok, 2019
- Anomaloglossus moffetti Barrio-Amorós and Brewer-Carias, 2008
- Anomaloglossus murisipanensis (La Marca, 1997)
- Anomaloglossus parimae (La Marca, 1997)
- Anomaloglossus parkerae (Meinhardt and Parmalee, 1996)
- Anomaloglossus praderioi (La Marca, 1997)
- Anomaloglossus roraima (La Marca, 1997)
- Anomaloglossus rufulus (Gorzula, 1990)
- Anomaloglossus shrevei (Rivero, 1961)
- Anomaloglossus stepheni (Martins, 1989)
- Anomaloglossus surinamensis Ouboter and Jairam, 2012
- Anomaloglossus tamacuarensis (Myers and Donnelly, 1997)
- Anomaloglossus tepequem Fouquet, Souza, Nunes, Kok, Curcio, Carvalho, Grant, and Rodrigues, 2015
- Anomaloglossus tepuyensis (La Marca, 1997)
- Anomaloglossus triunfo (Barrio-Amorós, Fuentes-Ramos, and Rivas-Fuenmayor, 2004)
- Anomaloglossus verbeeksnyderorum Barrio-Amorós, Santos, and Jovanovic, 2010
- Anomaloglossus wothuja (Barrio-Amorós, Fuentes-Ramos, and Rivas-Fuenmayor, 2004)
