= Anomaloglossus parimae =

Conservation status
- Data Deficient (IUCN 3.1)

Scientific classification
- Kingdom: Animalia
- Phylum: Chordata
- Class: Amphibia
- Order: Anura
- Family: Aromobatidae
- Genus: Anomaloglossus
- Species: A. parimae

Binomial name
- Anomaloglossus parimae (La Marca, 1997)

Synonyms
- Colostethus parimae La Marca, 1997

Species of frog

Anomaloglossus parimae is a species of frog in the family Aromobatidae. It is endemic to Venezuela where it is only known from its type locality, Pista Constitución in the Parima Mountains in the Amazonas state; it is expected to be found in nearby Brazil too.

== Habitat ==
Its natural habitat is tropical rainforest. Scientists know the frog from its type locality, Serranía Parima, between 640 and 670 meters above sea level.

The frog has been found within at least one protected area: Parima-Tapirapecó National Park and Alto Orinoco-Casiquiare Biosphere Reserve.

== Reproduction ==
Scientists Believe this frog has young the same way other frogs in Anomaloglossus do: The female frog lays eggs on the ground and the adult frogs carry the tadpoles to streams.

== Threatened ==
The IUCN classifies this species as data deficient. Although its habitat is remote, there was illegal gold mining taking place there in the 1990s. There are no reports covering whether this mining persists in the current century.
