= Anomaloglossus leopardus =

Conservation status
- Least Concern (IUCN 3.1)

Scientific classification
- Kingdom: Animalia
- Phylum: Chordata
- Class: Amphibia
- Order: Anura
- Family: Aromobatidae
- Genus: Anomaloglossus
- Species: A. leopardus

Binomial name
- Anomaloglossus leopardus Ouboter and Jairam, 2012

Species of frog

Anomaloglossus leopardus, the leopard rocket frog, is a species of frog in the family Aromobatidae. It is endemic to Suriname and suspected in Brazil.

== Habitat ==
This frog lives in primary rainforests near streams. It was observed 480 meters above sea level.

This frog has been found in one protected area, Sipaliwini Nature Reserve.

== Reproduction ==
Scientists believe these frogs may reproduce in the same manner as its congeners: The female lays eggs on leaves, and the adult frogs carry the tadpoles to water.

== Threats ==
The IUCN classifies this frog as least concern of extinction because of its pristine habitat. However, the fungal disease chytridiomycosis has killed many other amphibians in the area and scientists believe this species is likely to be susceptible as well.

== Original description ==
- Ouboter, Paul E.; Jairam, Rawien (2012). Amphibians of Suriname. Leiden: Brill. doi:10.1163/9789004208001. ISBN 978-90-04-20800-1.
