= Atractus matthewi =

Conservation status
- Least Concern (IUCN 3.1)

Scientific classification
- Kingdom: Animalia
- Phylum: Chordata
- Class: Reptilia
- Order: Squamata
- Suborder: Serpentes
- Family: Colubridae
- Genus: Atractus
- Species: A. matthewi

Binomial name
- Atractus matthewi Markezich & Barrio-Amorós, 2004

Synonyms
- Atractus nororientalis Sánchez, De Sousa, Esqueda & Manzanilla, 2004

Species of snake

Atractus matthewi is a species of snake in the subfamily Dipsadinae of the family Colubridae. The species is endemic to Venezuela.

== Etymology ==
The specific name, matthewi, is in honor of Matthew Markezich (born 1990), son of the senior describer.

== Description ==
Medium-sized for its genus, Atractus matthewi may attain a total length (tail included) of 36.5 cm (14.4 in). The tail is short, only about 10% of the total length. There are seven upper labials and seven lower labials (rarely six and six). The dorsal scales are arranged in 17 rows throughout the length of the body. The ventrals number 160–168, and the subcaudals 23–28.

== Geographic distribution ==
Atractus matthewi is found in the Venezuelan states of Anzoátegui and Sucre.

== Habitat ==
The preferred natural habitat of Atractus matthewi is forest, at altitudes of 1,660–2,130 m (5,450–6,990 ft), but it has also been found in coffee plantations.

== Reproduction ==
Atractus matthewi is oviparous.
