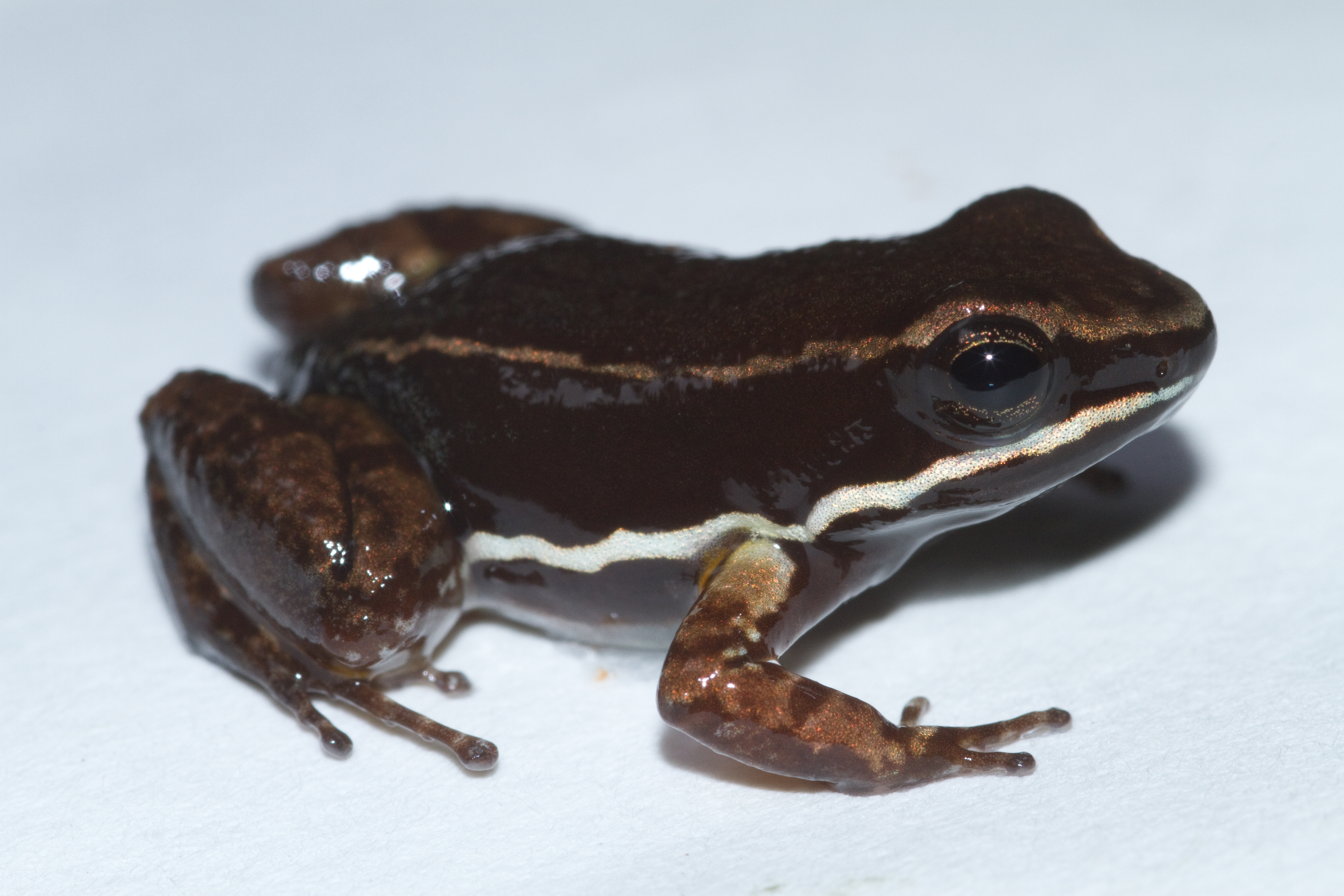

Conservation status
- Least Concern (IUCN 3.1)

Scientific classification
- Kingdom: Animalia
- Phylum: Chordata
- Class: Amphibia
- Order: Anura
- Family: Aromobatidae
- Genus: Allobates
- Species: A. talamancae

Binomial name
- Allobates talamancae (Cope, 1875)

Synonyms
- Dendrobates talamancae Cope, 1875 "1876"; Colostethus talamancae (Cope, 1875)

= Allobates talamancae =

Species of frog

Allobates talamancae (common names: Talamanca rocket frog, striped rocket frog, Talamanca striped rocket frog) is a species of frog in the family Aromobatidae. It is found in northwestern Ecuador, western Colombia, Panama, Costa Rica, and southern Nicaragua.

== Description ==
Allobates talamancae is a small, non-toxic frog, with males measuring 17–24 mm (0.67–0.94 in) in snout–vent length and females 16–25 mm (0.63–0.98 in). The dorsum is smooth and dark brown in color. The flanks are black, bordered by tan or bronze line above and a white line below. The ventrum is white. The fingers and toes are unwebbed.

== Reproduction ==
Allobates talamancae lay the eggs in the leaf-litter, and both parents carry the tadpoles to streams where they complete their development in small, water-filled depressions.

== Habitat, ecology, and conservation ==
Allobates talamancae is found in a variety of habitats in very humid lowland and premontane habitats (secondary growth and plantations, swampy areas in primary forest, but not in open areas), usually close to streams. It can be found up to 800 m (2,600 ft) (970 m (3,180 ft) in Colombia) above sea level. Its diet consists of small arthropods. Adult frogs are found to aggregate, forming small groups, likely as an anti-predator adaptation.

While it is a common species, its conservation is threatened by habitat loss, introduction of alien predatory fish, and pollution.
