= Pristimantis koki =

Scientific classification
- Kingdom: Animalia
- Phylum: Chordata
- Class: Amphibia
- Order: Anura
- Clade: Brachycephaloidea
- Family: Craugastoridae
- Genus: Pristimantis
- Species: P. koki

Binomial name
- Pristimantis koki Means, Heinicke, Hedges, MacCulloch & Lathrop, 2023

Species of frog

Pristimantis koki, the Guyanan black-rumped landfrog, is a species of frog in the family Strabomantidae. It is endemic to the Guiana Highlands of west-central Guyana, where it is currently known only from the Wokomung Massif in the Potaro-Siparuni district. The species was formally described in 2023 and is a member of the Pristimantis unistrigatus species group.

== Description ==
Pristimantis koki is a small terrestrial frog. Adult males measure approximately 12–14 mm (0.47–0.55 in) in snout–vent length, while adult females measure approximately 16–20 mm (0.63–0.79 in).

A diagnostic feature of the species is the presence of conspicuous black pigmentation surrounding the cloacal region, bordered by lighter coloration. When handled, individuals have been reported to emit volatile organic compounds that can produce a mild numbing sensation on the human tongue.

== Taxonomic history ==
The species was described by D. Bruce Means, Matthew P. Heinicke, S. Blair Hedges, Ross D. MacCulloch, and Amy Lathrop in 2023 as part of a taxonomic review of high-elevation Pristimantis frogs from the Wokomung Massif in Guyana. Pristimantis koki was assigned to the P. unistrigatus species group, a diverse assemblage of terrestrial direct-developing frogs distributed throughout northern South America and Central America. Phylogenetic comparisons identified Pristimantis kalamandeenae as its closest known relative.

== Distribution and habitat ==
The species is known only from the Wokomung Massif in the Pakaraima Mountains of Guyana and is presumed to be endemic to this region. It inhabits montane cloud forest at elevations from 1,000 to 1,600 m (3,300 to 5,200 ft), where individuals have been observed on fallen logs, sticks, and low vegetation within the forest understory.

== Ecology and behaviour ==
Like other members of the genus Pristimantis, P. koki exhibits direct development, in which eggs develop directly into miniature froglets without a free-living tadpole stage.

== Etymology ==
The specific name koki honours Belgian evolutionary biologist Philippe J. R. Kok, in recognition of his contributions to the study of amphibian diversity in the Guiana Shield.
