= "Prostherapis" dunni =

Conservation status
- Critically Endangered (IUCN 3.1)

Scientific classification
- Kingdom: Animalia
- Phylum: Chordata
- Class: Amphibia
- Order: Anura
- Family: Aromobatidae
- Genus: "Prostherapis"
- Species: "P." dunni

Binomial name
- "Prostherapis" dunni Rivero, 1961

Synonyms
- Colostethus dunni (Rivero, 1961)

Species of frog

"Prostherapis" dunni is a species of frog endemic to the Venezuelan Coastal Range. Its taxonomic position is uncertain, apart from its placement in the family Aromobatidae; it might be an Aromobates.

The frog is diurnal and lives near creeks in montane forests. It was assessed as critically endangered (possibly extinct) by the IUCN in 2019. The primary threat it faces is habitat loss and degradation due to local human activity. Chytridiomycosis has not been confirmed in the species, but the disease has been detected in other amphibians native to Cordillera de la Costa. Prostherapis dunni was last seen in 1977, with later surveys failing to find it.
