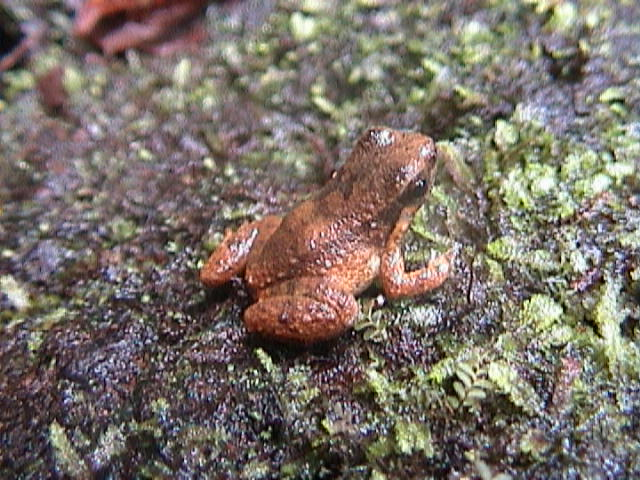

Conservation status
- Critically Endangered (IUCN 3.1)

Scientific classification
- Kingdom: Animalia
- Phylum: Chordata
- Class: Amphibia
- Order: Anura
- Family: Aromobatidae
- Genus: Anomaloglossus
- Species: A. degranvillei

Binomial name
- Anomaloglossus degranvillei (Lescure, 1975)

Synonyms
- Colostethus degranvillei Lescure, 1975

= Anomaloglossus degranvillei =

Species of frog

Anomaloglossus degranvillei (common name: Degranville's rocket frog) is a species of frog in the family Aromobatidae. It is known from French Guiana but is likely to occur also in Suriname and Brazil, and possibly in Guyana. It is named in honour of Jean-Jacques de Granville, a botanist from French Guiana.

== Description ==
Anomaloglossus degranvillei are small frogs: their snout–vent length is about 14–20.5 mm (0.55–0.81 in). Their ventral colouration is black brown with white spots. Male frogs carry tadpoles on their back where they complete their development; tadpoles do not feed.

== Habitat and conservation ==
Anomaloglossus degranvillei inhabit edges of rocky streams. They are not found where streams cross swampy or sandy terrain. They are diurnal and appear to be territorial. Scientists observed this frog about 400 meters above sea level.

Scientists have seen this frog inside one protected area, Parc Amazonien de Guyane.
