= Venezuelan mountain skink =

Conservation status
- Least Concern (IUCN 3.1)

Scientific classification
- Kingdom: Animalia
- Phylum: Chordata
- Class: Reptilia
- Order: Squamata
- Family: Scincidae
- Genus: Orosaura; Hedges & Conn, 2012
- Species: O. nebulosylvestris

Binomial name
- Orosaura nebulosylvestris (Miralles, Rivas, Bonillo, Schargel, Barros, García-Perez & Barrio-Amorós, 2009)

Synonyms
- Mabuya nebulosylvestris Miralles et al., 2009

Species of lizard

The Venezuelan mountain skink (Orosaura nebulosylvestris) is a reptile, a member of the skink family, Scincidae. It is monotypic in the genus Orosaura.

== Range and distribution ==
They are distributed throughout the highlands of the Venezuelan coastal range and the Andean Cordillerea of Mérida. The species is found in open areas at the edges of cloud forest, shrubby vegetation of subparamos, and rural gardens.

== Anatomy ==
This genus is characterized by two or four frontoparietal (rarely five or six), one row of nuchals, 48-56 dorsals, 27-38 ventrals, (these counts were by different methods, dorsolateral stripes, a dark lateral stripe, and dark ventral striping. Orosaura has what appears to be a pair of irregular, dark nape stripes or lines of spots immediately adjacent to the pale dorsolateral stripes. The maximum body size for this species is 97 mm. This species is less prone to decline due to their relatively wide range.
