= Anomaloglossus moffetti =

Conservation status
- Near Threatened (IUCN 3.1)

Scientific classification
- Kingdom: Animalia
- Phylum: Chordata
- Class: Amphibia
- Order: Anura
- Family: Aromobatidae
- Genus: Anomaloglossus
- Species: A. moffetti

Binomial name
- Anomaloglossus moffetti Barrio-Amorós and Brewer-Carias, 2008

Species of frog

Anomaloglossus moffetti, the Sarisariñama rocket frog, is a species of frog in the family Aromobatidae. It is endemic to Bolivar, Venezuela and suspected in Brazil.

== Description ==
The adult female frog can reach 26.9 mm in snout-vent length. The skin of the dorsum is brown with dark spots. The ventrum and ventral surfaces of the hind legs are yellow or orange in color. The flanks are black with silver-white spots, sometimes bordered by brown-orange stripes. There is a white or yellow stripe on each side of the body. There is light brown or orange color under each eye. There are small blue spots on the upper lip.

== Etymology ==
Scientists named this frog after photographer Mark Moffett.

== Habitat ==
This has been found in cascading streams and in the spray areas of waterfalls. It was found on the Sarisariñama-tepui flatland 1108 meters above sea level.

The frog was found exclusively within Jaua-Sarisariñama National Park.

== Reproduction ==
Scientists have not reported any observations of the tadpoles but they infer that they develop in streams, like their congeners.

== Threats ==
The IUCN classifies this frog as near threatened. Scientists cite climate change as a principal threat, both in its ability to change temperatures and humidity directly and in changes to the plants on the tepui. Like other high-altitude species, the frog would have great difficulty migrating to a new range if its current habitat should change. Diseases from fungi, bacteria, and viruses can also kill this frog.

== Original description ==
- Barrio-Amoros CL; Brewer-Carias C (2008). "Herpetological results of the 2002 expedition to Sarisarinama, a tepui in Venezuelan Guyana, with the description of five new species". Zootaxa. 1942: 1–68.
