= Anomaloglossus verbeeksnyderorum =

Conservation status
- Least Concern (IUCN 3.1)

Scientific classification
- Kingdom: Animalia
- Phylum: Chordata
- Class: Amphibia
- Order: Anura
- Family: Aromobatidae
- Genus: Anomaloglossus
- Species: A. verbeeksnyderorum

Binomial name
- Anomaloglossus verbeeksnyderorum Barrio-Amorós and Brewer-Carias, 2008

Species of frog

Anomaloglossus verbeeksnyderorum is a species of frog in the family Aromobatidae. It is endemic to Venezuela.

== Habitat ==
This diurnal frog lives in streams with granite beds that flow through primary forest. Scientists have observed this frog between 56 and 300 meters above sea level.

Scientists believe this frog's range might overlap with several protected areas, such as Sipapo Forest Reserve and Chivapure-Cuchivero Forest Area Under Protection.

== Reproduction ==
The male frogs hide in the leaf litter and call to the female frogs. Oviposition has not been observed. After the eggs hatch, the male frogs carry the tadpoles to ponds, where they develop.

== Threats ==
The IUCN classifies this species as least concern of extinction. It does face some threat from pollution and habitat loss and disturbance from tourism. Aluminim and gold mining in the area also pose some threat.

== Original publication ==
- Barrio-Amoros CL; Santos JC; Jovanovic O (2010). "A new dendrobatid frog (Anura: Dendrobatidae:Anomaloglossus) from the Orinoquian rainforest, southern Venezuela". Zootaxa. 2413: 37–50.
