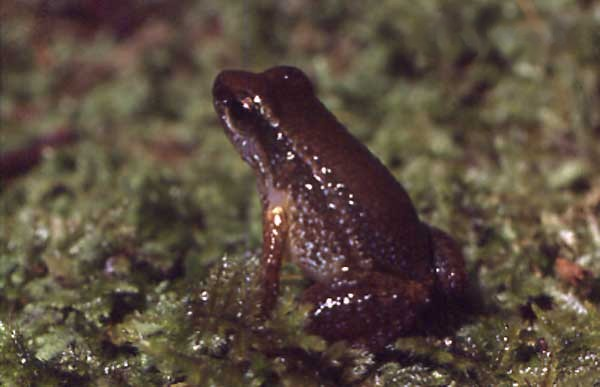

Conservation status
- Least Concern (IUCN 3.1)

Scientific classification
- Kingdom: Animalia
- Phylum: Chordata
- Class: Amphibia
- Order: Anura
- Family: Aromobatidae
- Genus: Anomaloglossus
- Species: A. stepheni

Binomial name
- Anomaloglossus stepheni (Martins, 1990)

Synonyms
- Colostethus stepheni Martins, 1990

= Anomaloglossus stepheni =

Species of frog

Anomaloglossus stepheni (common name: Stephen's rocket frog) is a species of frog in the family Aromobatidae. It is found in French Guiana and adjacent Suriname and Brazil.

== Description ==
Colostethus stepheni is a small frog. Males measure about 14–17 millimetres (0.55–0.67 in) from snout to vent and females about 16–18 mm (0.63–0.71 in). Its general colour is some shade of brown and it has a dark stripe running down either side extending about halfway along the body. There are bluish-white specks below this and on the toes. The male has a white or grey vocal sac and the female a pale throat.

== Distribution ==
Colostethus stepheni occurs in French Guiana and adjacent Suriname as well as in the Amazon rainforest of Brazil where it is widespread in the Adolfo Ducke Forest Reserve near the confluence of the Rio Negro and Solimões River.

== Biology ==
Colostethus stepheni is a diurnal, terrestrial species spending its life in forest litter where it forages on invertebrates such as termites, beetles and flies. Breeding takes place in the rainy season. The male finds a suitable location and calls to attract a female. The nesting site is a boat-shaped curled up fallen leaf with another above acting as a roof. The female lays three to six eggs with gelatinous capsules inside the hollow leaf and remains at the nest for about an hour. After that she departs and the male returns and guards the eggs. He is territorial and drives off male intruders and seldom goes further than 20 centimetres (7.9 in) from the nest, continuing to remain nearby as the tadpoles develop. Further females are encouraged to lay inside the nest which may come to have several developing clutches of eggs of different ages. The developing larvae are not transported to water, as is the case with the related dendrobatids, but complete their development on land. Metamorphosis into juvenile frogs occurs after about 31 days.

== Status ==
Colostethus stepheni is listed as being of "Least Concern" in the IUCN Red List of Threatened Species. It is assumed to have a large population and wide range and the population appears to be stable.
