= Anomaloglossus shrevei =

Conservation status
- Near Threatened (IUCN 3.1)

Scientific classification
- Kingdom: Animalia
- Phylum: Chordata
- Class: Amphibia
- Order: Anura
- Family: Aromobatidae
- Genus: Anomaloglossus
- Species: A. shrevei

Binomial name
- Anomaloglossus shrevei (Rivero, 1961)

Synonyms
- Colostethus shrevei Rivero, 1961

Species of frog

Anomaloglossus shrevei (common name: Shreve's rocket frog) is a species of frog in the family Aromobatidae. It is endemic to Venezuela where it is only known from the Cerro Marahuaca and Cerro Duida, two adjacent tepuis. Scientists have seen the frog between 350 and 1200 meters above sea level. These frogs live near streams in tropical rainforest. It is not a common species but the population may be presently stable and is protected by Parque Nacional Duida-Marahuaca.

The IUCN classifies this frog as near threatened. Diseases may pose some threat. Climate change may threaten this species less than others because of its ability to live at low, medium, or high elevations.
