= Allobates caribe =

Conservation status
- Critically Endangered (IUCN 3.1)

Scientific classification
- Kingdom: Animalia
- Phylum: Chordata
- Class: Amphibia
- Order: Anura
- Family: Aromobatidae
- Genus: Allobates
- Species: A. caribe

Binomial name
- Allobates caribe (Barrio-Amorós, Rivas-Fuenmayor, and Kaiser, 2006)

Synonyms
- Colostethus caribe Lima, Sanchez, and Souza, 2007; Allobates caribe Grant, Frost, Caldwell, Gagliardo, Haddad, Kok, Means, Noonan, Schargel, and Wheeler, 2006

Species of frog

Allobates caribe, the Caribbean nurse frog, is a frog in the family Aromobatidae. It lives in Estado Sucre, Venezuela.

== Habitat ==
Scientists know this species from the type locality, 1050 meters above sea level. They observed three female frogs in a dry streambed. This place was near but not within Península de Paria National Park, so scientists suspect the frog may live there.

== Reproduction ==
The tadpoles develop in streams and pools of water.

== Threats ==
The IUCN classifies this animal as critically endangered. The principal threat is habitat loss associated with fires, logging, and forest conversion to tourism infrastructure and farms for such crops as ocumo blanco, ocumo chino, cocoa, and occasionally coffee.

Scientists have found the fungus Batrachochytrium dendrobatidis on other amphibians in this part of the world but have yet to confirm whether chytridiomycosis has killed many A. caribe.
