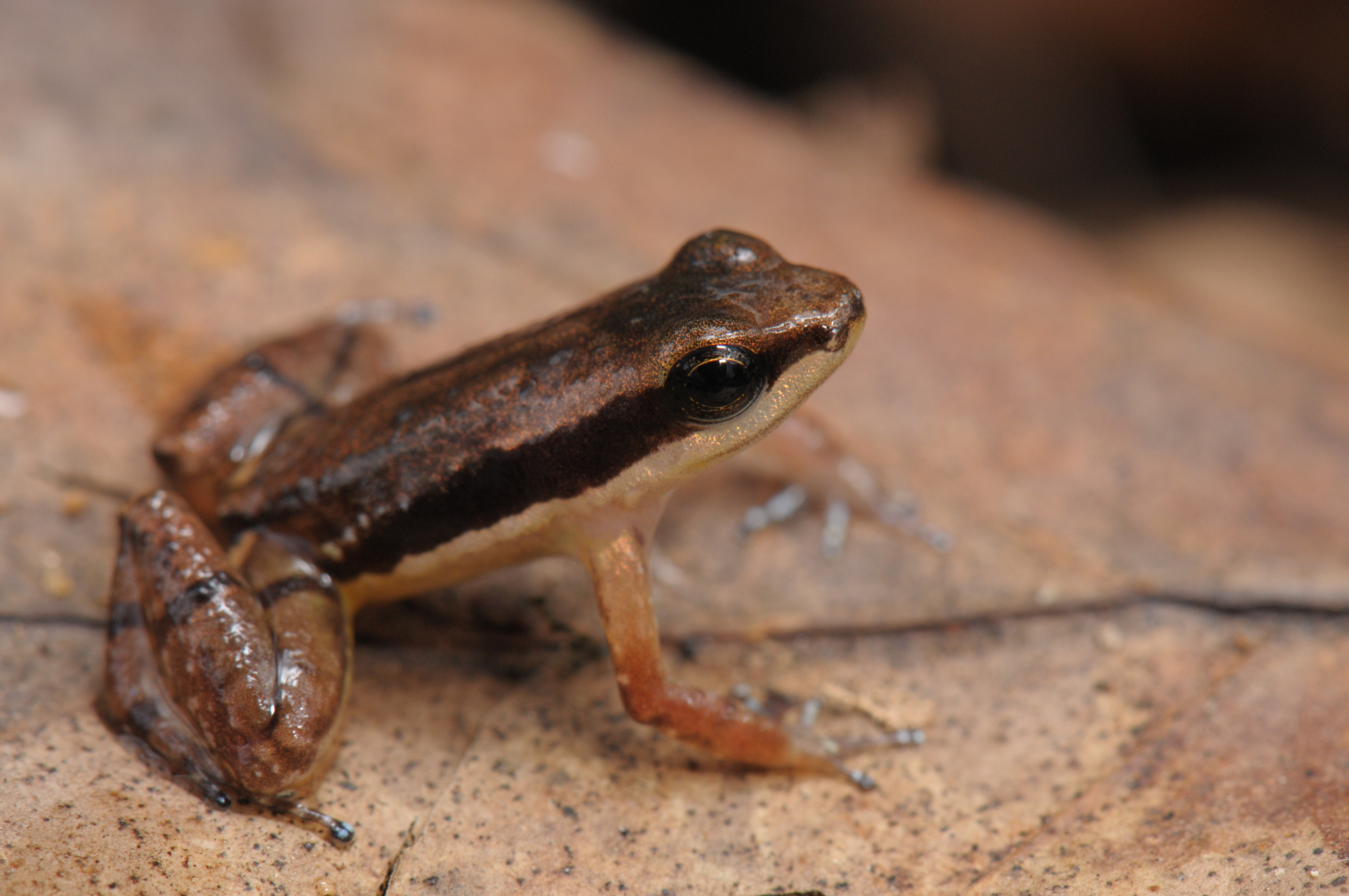

Conservation status
- Least Concern (IUCN 3.1)

Scientific classification
- Kingdom: Animalia
- Phylum: Chordata
- Class: Amphibia
- Order: Anura
- Family: Aromobatidae
- Genus: Dryadobates
- Species: D. olfersioides

Binomial name
- Dryadobates olfersioides (Lutz, 1925)

Synonyms
- Eupemphix olfersioïdes Lutz, 1925; Phyllobates olfersioides Bokermann, 1966; Colostethus olfersioides Edwards, 1971; Phyllobates capixaba Bokermann, 1967; Allobates olfersioides Grant, Frost, Caldwell, et al., 2006

= Dryadobates olfersioides =

Rio rocket frog

Species of frog

Dryadobates olfersioides, the Rio rocket frog, is a species of frog in the family Aromobatidae. It is endemic to the coastal regions of the Atlantic Forest biome of eastern Brazil.

This formerly very common species has recently declined and is now absent from many historical locations, but remains common in some areas. It is threatened by habitat loss and possibly chytridiomycosis.

The natural habitats of Dryadobates olfersioides are primary and secondary forests. It is a diurnal frog that lives on the forest floor. Clutch size is up to 11 eggs. Eggs are laid in a terrestrial nest where they hatch. Tadpoles are carried by the parents to puddles or small rivulets where they feed until metamorphosis.

== Status ==
While the IUCN currently lists this species as Least Concern, this assessment was performed under the assumption that Dryadobates olfersioides contains four subpopulations, originally described by Werner Bokermann as distinct species Phyllobates olfersiodes, P. capixaba, P. carioca, and P. alagoanus. Following the re-elevation of Dryadobates alagoanus, Dryadobates capixaba, and Dryadobates carioca to species status, D. olfersioides is confined to the IUCN-described subpopulation in Rio de Janeiro. No individual has been found in the Rio de Janeiro population since the 1970s, and Grant et al. conclude that this species is critically endangered, if not extinct.
