= Pristimantis yustizi =

Conservation status
- Vulnerable (IUCN 3.1)

Scientific classification
- Kingdom: Animalia
- Phylum: Chordata
- Class: Amphibia
- Order: Anura
- Family: Strabomantidae
- Genus: Pristimantis
- Species: P. yustizi

Binomial name
- Pristimantis yustizi (Barrio-Amorós & Chacón-Ortiz, 2004)

Synonyms
- Eleutherodactylus yustizi Barrio-Amorós & Chacón-Ortiz, 2004

Species of amphibian

Pristimantis yustizi is a species of frogs in the family Strabomantidae.

It is endemic to Venezuela. Its natural habitat is subtropical or tropical moist montane forests. It is threatened by habitat loss.
