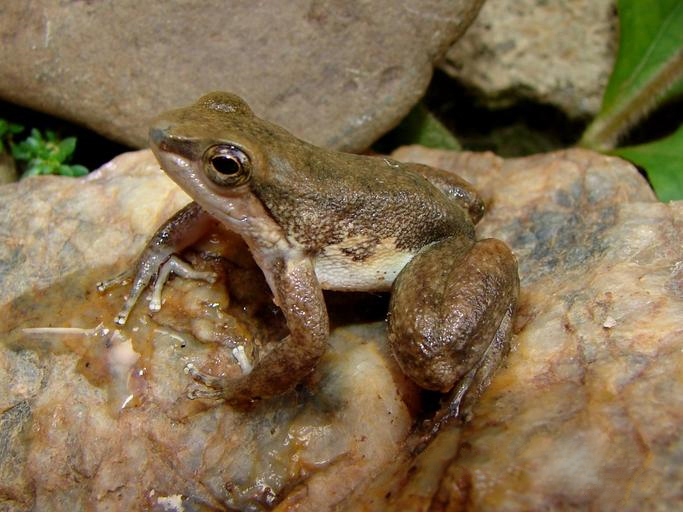

Conservation status
- Least Concern (IUCN 3.1)

Scientific classification
- Kingdom: Animalia
- Phylum: Chordata
- Class: Amphibia
- Order: Anura
- Family: Aromobatidae
- Genus: Rheobates
- Species: R. palmatus

Binomial name
- Rheobates palmatus (Werner, 1899)

Synonyms
- Phyllobates (Hypodictyon) palmatus Werner, 1899; Colostethus palmatus (Werner, 1899)

= Rheobates palmatus =

Species of frog

Rheobates palmatus is a species of frog in the family Aromobatidae. It is the type species of genus Rheobates erected in 2006. Its common name is palm rocket frog. It is endemic to Colombia. It is considered to be part of a species complex.

== Description ==
Rheobates palmatus has cryptic, brown or gray dorsal colouration and posteriorly granular skin texture. Toe webbing is extensive. It is also distinguishable by its large size. Its tadpoles are also large and are a uniform colour without markings.

== Distribution and habitat ==
Rheobates palmatus is endemic to the Colombian Andes and is found on both sides of the Cordillera Oriental and on the eastern side of the Cordillera Central range at heights of 350 to 2,200 metres (1,150 to 7,220 ft) above sea level. As it has not been found higher than 2,500 metres (8,200 ft), it is effectively divided into three distinct populations as those on the two slopes of the Cordillera Oriental are separated by a continuous, high altitude ridge. It has been found that the vocalisations of the males when seeking a mate varies between the different populations. It is a terrestrial species and is found in rainforests and cloud forests. In the Rio Magdalena Valley it is also found in pasture land, crops and even polluted streams.

This frog has been observed in one protected area: Parque Nacional Natural Serranía de Los Yariguíes.

== Status ==
Rheobates palmatus does not like being disturbed by humans. Near the Villavicencio–Bogotá road it became locally extinct but returned to its previous breeding sites when a new road was built, removing the traffic away from the old highway. The IUCN Red List of Threatened Species lists this species as being of "Least Concern" on the grounds that it has a reasonably wide range and a stable population, and seems to be an adaptable species.
