= Sierra de Lema =

Venezuelan mountain range

- Location within Venezuela

Highest point
- Elevation: 1,650 m (5,410 ft)

Geography
- Location: Bolívar state, Venezuela
- Range coordinates: 06°N 62°W
- Parent range: Guayana Shield

Geology
- Orogenies: igneous, metamorphic, & sedimentary rock
- Rock age(s): Precambrian, Mesozoic

The Sierra de Lema is an upland mountain range area with tepuis, located in Bolívar state of southeastern Venezuela.

The names Sierra Rinocote and Sierra Usupamo have historically been applied to its eastern and western portions, respectively.

== Geography ==
The Sierra de Lema is geologically part of the Guayana Shield, and biogeographically part of the Guayana Highlands.

Lying north of the Gran Sabana, it marks the drainage divide between the Caroní River and Cuyuni River drainage basins. It is partly within the bounds of Canaima National Park and encompasses a number of prominent tepuis, including the entire Los Testigos chain and Ptari Massif. The elevational range of the Sierra de Lema is around 150–1,650 metres (490–5,410 ft) above sea level.

The chain of tepui mountains that comprises the Sierra de Lema is around 30 kilometres (19 mi) wide. Because the toponymy of the region remains largely unresolved, the stated length of the Sierra de Lema can vary widely, depending on the definition used. When considering only the uplands that mark the northern boundary of the Gran Sabana, the Sierra de Lema spans around 80 km (50 mi).

The extent of the range exceeds 200 km (120 mi) if the entire chain separating the Caroní and Cuyuni drainage basins is included. By the latter definition, the Sierra de Lema stretches from Cerro Venamo in the east to Serranía Supamo and Cerro Santa Rosa (mountain) in the west, very close to the confluence of the Paragua River and Caroní River.

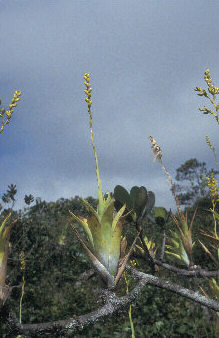
Catopsis berteroniana, an epiphyte plant in the Sierra de Lema.

== Ecology ==
The old-growth forest section of the Sierra de Lema, in the Guayanan Highlands moist forests ecoregion, remains virtually intact. It covers a contiguous area of some 1,000 square kilometres (390 sq mi). It is characterised by nutrient poor soils with a low pH and high aluminium content.

The El Mirador ("The Lookout") area at the base of the Sierra de Lema exhibits unusually high levels of the radioisotope Caesium-137, in both its soils and vegetation. This is likely related to the ground composition and cloud forest conditions of the site. The undulating, forested landscape of La Escalera ("The Staircase") also forms part of the Sierra de Lema.

== Geology ==
The Sierra de Lema consists of an igneous-metamorphic basement overlain by Precambrian sedimentary rocks of the Roraima Group, with Mesozoic diabase intrusions.

== See also ==
- Guayana Highlands topics
- Distribution of Heliamphora — with species endemic-native to the Sierra de Lema.
