= Philippe Jacques Robert Kok =

Belgian herpetologist (born 1970)

- Born: December 20, 1970; Watsa, Democratic Republic of the Congo
- Education: Leiden University, Vrije Universiteit Brussel, Université libre de Bruxelles
- Known for: Studies on the endemism and evolutionary history of the Pantepui herpetofauna
- Scientific career
- Fields: Evolutionary biology, Herpetology, Ecology
- Workplaces: University of Łódź
- Thesis: Islands in the Sky: Species diversity, evolutionary history, and patterns of endemism of the Pantepui Herpetofauna (2013)
- Doctoral advisor: Edi Gittenberger, Erik Smets

Philippe Jacques Robert Kok (born 20 December 1970) is an African-born Belgian evolutionary biologist, herpetologist, and ecologist. He is an associate professor at the University of Łódź in Poland. His research focuses on endemism in the herpetofauna of the biogeographic region of Pantepui in northern South America, particularly the tepui mountains of Venezuela.

== Biography ==
Kok was born in Watsa, near the African Great Lakes region in the Democratic Republic of the Congo. He completed his secondary education in 1989 at the Athénée Royal Émile Bockstael in Brussels and enrolled at the Université libre de Bruxelles (ULB) to study veterinary medicine, which he left in 1991. He then spent a year at the Institut Paul Lambin in Brussels studying biotechnology. At the age of 22, he decided to leave Belgium for the tropics and spent several weeks in French Guiana, where he began fieldwork in herpetology in the tropical rainforests of northern South America, his preferred field site thereafter.

Returning to Belgium, Kok became a scientific collaborator at the Royal Belgian Institute of Natural Sciences (IRSNB) in 1994. From 1996 onward, as part of a project on the systematics and biogeography of the Neotropical herpetofauna (focused on the Guiana Shield), he carried out numerous field expeditions in French Guiana, Guyana, and Venezuela. In 1998, Kok and colleagues from the IRSNB participated in a project on the reptile and amphibian diversity of Amphoe Na Haeo in Loei Province, Thailand, in collaboration with Srinakharinwirot University in Bangkok. In 1999, Kok became the Belgian government's CITES expert on amphibians and reptiles. Between 2003 and 2007, he worked as an independent scientific consultant, notably for Pairi Daiza (then Parc Paradisio) in Brugelette, Belgium. From 2004 to 2008, he received funding from the Belgian Directorate-General for Development Cooperation for a Global Taxonomy Initiative project on the biodiversity of the herpetofauna of the Kaieteur National Park in Guyana (later expanded to the Guiana Shield), which aimed to train local scientists in taxonomy and parataxonomy.

From 2007 to 2021, Kok served as co-editor of the journal Phyllomedusa – Journal of Herpetology and as subject editor of Check List from 2011 to 2014. Since 2012, he has been a member of the scientific board of the Boletim do Museu Paraense Emílio Goeldi in Belém, Brazil. He has acted as a peer reviewer for journals including the Journal of Herpetology, Zootaxa, American Museum Novitates, Herpetologica, Journal of Biogeography, and Contributions to Zoology. From 2009 to 2023, Kok was a part-time researcher at the Amphibian Evolution Lab of the Vrije Universiteit Brussel, where he also taught field herpetology to master's students in the herpetology program.

Beginning his doctoral studies in 2011, Kok earned his Ph.D. in 2013 at Leiden University under the supervision of Edi Gittenberger and Erik Smets, with the dissertation Islands in the Sky: Species diversity, evolutionary history, and patterns of endemism of the Pantepui Herpetofauna. From 2013 to 2019, Kok held a postdoctoral fellowship and lectureship funded by the FWO at the Vrije Universiteit Brussel. Since 2020, he has been an associate professor in the Department of Ecology and Vertebrate Zoology, Faculty of Biology and Environmental Protection, at the University of Łódź, where he obtained his Doctor of Science (DSc) degree in 2023.

Since 2012, Kok has served as regional co-chair of the IUCN/SSC Amphibian Specialist Group for the Guiana Shield. Since 2014, he has been a scientific advisor for the Reptile Database in Heidelberg, Germany, and since 2019, a visiting researcher at the Natural History Museum in London. Since 2021, he has been on the editorial board of the Journal of Vertebrate Zoology, published by the Institute of Vertebrate Biology in Brno, Czech Republic.

Kok founded the research group STELLAR (Systematics, Taxonomy, Ecology and Evolution of Amphibians and Reptiles), which aims to advance and disseminate knowledge about the origin and diversity of amphibians and reptiles. The group's research covers biogeography, distribution, phylogenetics, population genetics and genomics, ecology, eusociality, and physiology, mainly from an evolutionary perspective. A large part of this research focuses on taxa inhabiting the summits of the South American tepui plateaus. The group also conducts collection-based studies, especially systematic revisions of amphibian and reptile taxa from the Guiana Shield.

== Eponymy ==
In 2023, D. Bruce Means, Matthew P. Heinicke, S. Blair Hedges, Ross D. MacCulloch, and Amy Lathrop named the frog species Pristimantis koki from Guyana in honour of Philippe J. R. Kok.

In 2025, Mark Wilkinson and Gabriela B. Bittencourt-Silva named Rhinatrema koki, an amphibian found in Guyana, after Kok.
