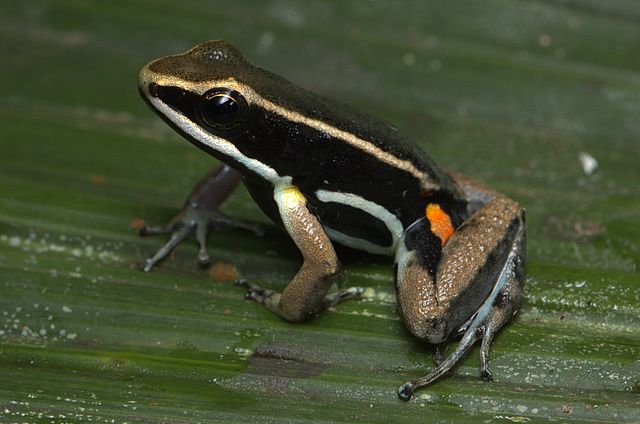
- Allobates femoralis

Scientific classification
- Kingdom: Animalia
- Phylum: Chordata
- Class: Amphibia
- Order: Anura
- Superfamily: Dendrobatoidea
- Family: Aromobatidae; Grant, Frost, Caldwell, Gagliardo, Haddad, Kok, Means, Noonan, Schargel, and Wheeler, 2006

Subfamilies and genera
- Anomaloglossinae Grant et al., 2006; Anomaloglossus; Rheobates; Aromobatinae Grant et al., 2006; Aromobates; Mannophryne; Allobatinae Grant et al., 2006; Allobates

= Aromobatidae =

Family of amphibians

The Aromobatidae are a family of frogs native to Central and South America. They are sometimes referred to as cryptic forest frogs or cryptic poison frogs. They are the sister taxon of the Dendrobatidae, the poison dart frogs, but are not as toxic as most dendrobatids are.

== Taxonomy ==
The Aromobatidae were separated from the Dendrobatidae only in 2006, and some sources continue to treat these frogs as part of the Dendrobatidae. However, their position as the sister taxa is well supported, and the question is primarily about whether they should be ranked as a family or a subfamily.

The validity of subfamilies within the Aromobatidae is also unsettled. Some evidence points to paraphyly of at least the subfamily Anomaloglossinae, and genus Allobates, largely because of the uncertain placement of Allobates olfersioides.

Some species are reported to have a skunk like odor. This strong odor is secreted through the skin but these frogs are not toxic. This strong odor is used as a defense mechanism against predators.

== Reproduction ==
Many aromobatids deposit small clutches of eggs in terrestrial nests. After hatching, one of the parents transports the tadpoles to a small water body, where they complete their development to metamorphosis.

Anomaloglossus stepheni, Anomaloglossus degranvillei, Allobates chalcopis, and Allobates nidicola are four aromobatid species that have non-feeding tadpoles.

== Subfamilies and species ==
By late 2019, 126 species in three subfamilies and five genera had been described:

- Allobatinae Grant, Frost, Caldwell, Gagliardo, Haddad, Kok, Means, Noonan, Schargel, and Wheeler, 2006 (55 spp.)
  - Allobates Zimmermann and Zimmermann, 1988 (55 spp.)
- Anomaloglossinae Grant, Frost, Caldwell, Gagliardo, Haddad, Kok, Means, Noonan, Schargel, and Wheeler, 2006 (32 spp.)
  - Anomaloglossus Grant, Frost, Caldwell, Gagliardo, Haddad, Kok, Means, Noonan, Schargel, and Wheeler, 2006 (30 spp.)
  - Rheobates Grant, Frost, Caldwell, Gagliardo, Haddad, Kok, Means, Noonan, Schargel, and Wheeler, 2006 (two spp.)
- Aromobatinae Grant, Frost, Caldwell, Gagliardo, Haddad, Kok, Means, Noonan, Schargel, and Wheeler, 2006 (38 spp.)
  - Aromobates Myers, Paolillo-O., and Daly, 1991 (18 spp.)
  - Mannophryne La Marca, 1992 (20 spp.)

In addition, "Prostherapis" dunni Rivero, 1961 is placed in this family, but its more precise placement is unknown; it might be an Aromobates.

Selected Aromobatidae species
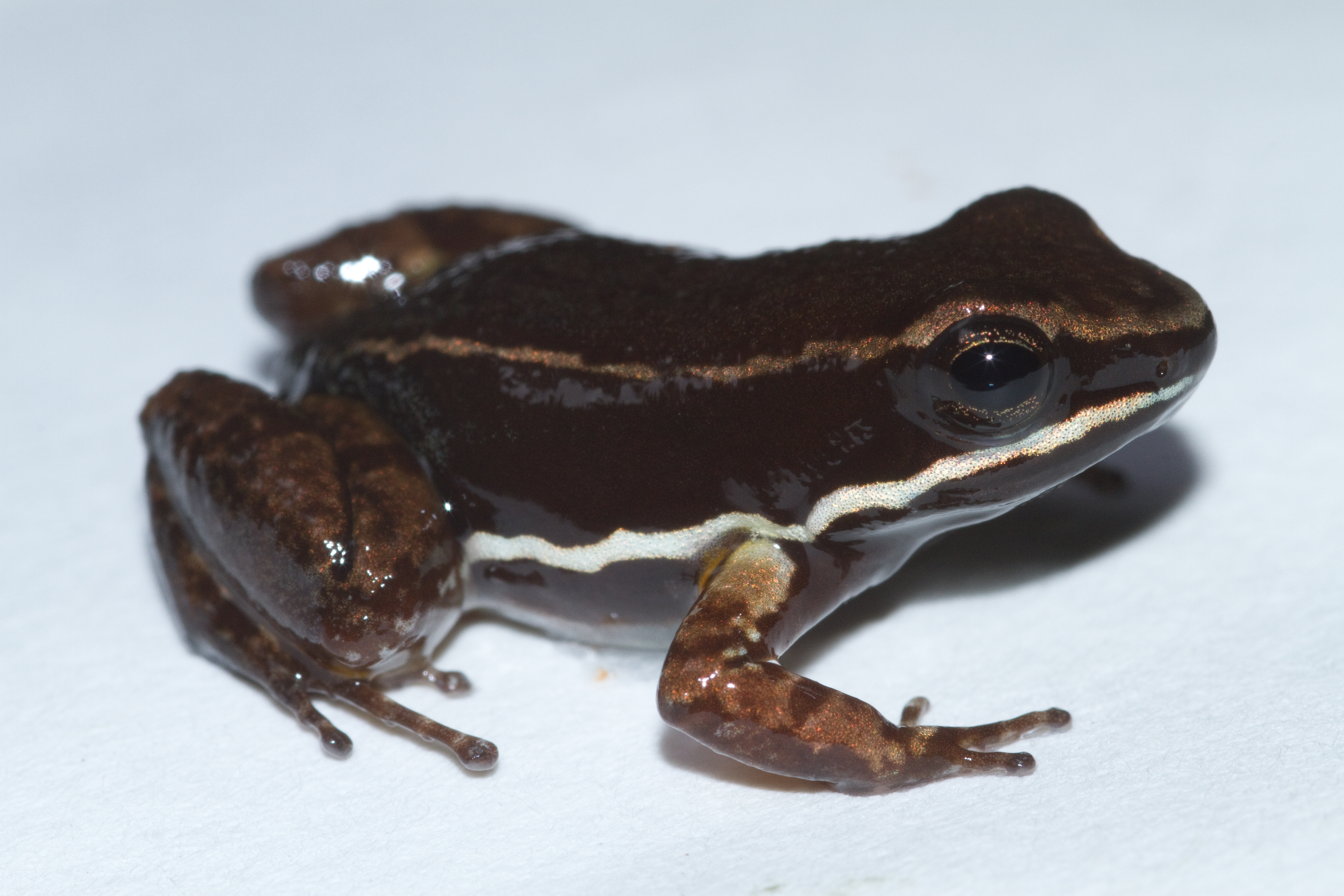
Allobates talamancae

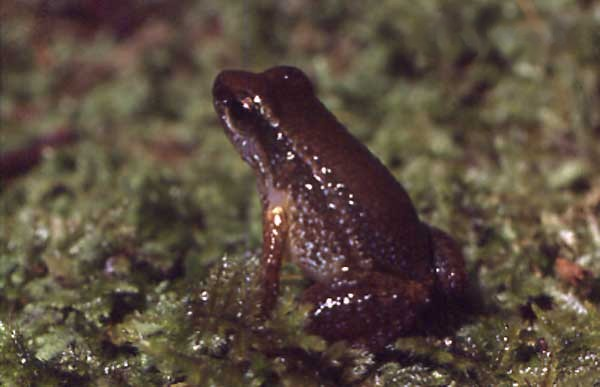
Anomaloglossus stepheni

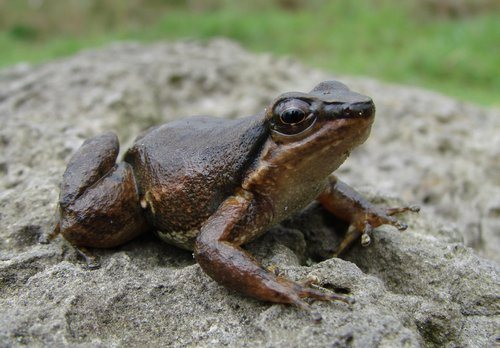
Rheobates palmatus

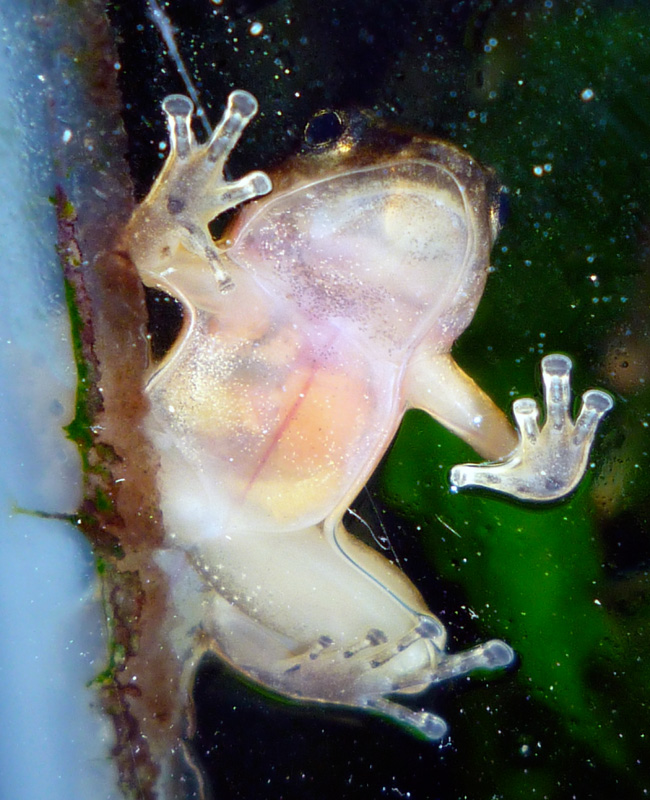
Mannophryne trinitatis
