= Geography of Guyana =

- Continent: South America
- Region: Caribbean
- Coordinates: 5°00′N 59°00′W
- Area: Ranked 83rd
  - Total: 214,969 km^{2} (83,000 sq mi)
  - Land: 91.57%
  - Water: 8.43%
- Coastline: 459 km (285 mi)
- Borders: total length 2,933 km (1,822 mi)
- Highest point: Mount Roraima; 2,762 metres (9,062 ft)
- Lowest point: Atlantic Ocean; 0 metres (0 ft)
- Longest river: Essequibo River; 1,010 km (630 mi)
- Largest lake: Capoey Lake; 9.31 km^{2} (3.59 mi^{2})
- Exclusive economic zone: 137,765 km^{2} (53,191 mi^{2})

The Geography of Guyana comprises the physical characteristics of the country in Northern South America and part of Caribbean South America, bordering the North Atlantic Ocean, between Suriname and Venezuela, with a land area of approximately 214,969 square kilometres or 83,000 square miles. The country is situated between 1 and 9 north latitude and between 56 and 62 west longitude. With a 459 km (285 mi)-long Atlantic coastline on the northeast, Guyana is bounded by Venezuela on the west, Brazil on the west and south, and Suriname on the east.

== Geographic regions ==
The land comprises three main geographical zones: the coastal plain, the white sand belt and the interior highlands.

The coastal plain, which occupies about 5 percent of the country's area, is home to more than 90 percent of its inhabitants. The plain ranges from five to six kilometers wide and extends from the Corentyne River in the east to the Venezuelan border in the northwest.

The coastal plain is made up largely of alluvial mud swept out to sea by the Amazon River, carried north by ocean currents, and deposited on the Guyanese shores. A rich clay of great fertility, this mud overlays the white sands and clays formed from the erosion of the interior bedrock and carried seaward by the rivers of Guyana. Because much of the coastal plain floods at high tide, efforts to dam and drain this area have gone on since the 18th century. A recent global remote sensing analysis suggested that there were 1,178 square kilometres or 455 square miles of tidal flats in Guyana, making it the 30th ranked country in terms of tidal flat area.

Guyana has no well-defined shoreline or sandy beaches. Approaching the ocean, the land gradually loses elevation until it includes many areas of marsh and swamp. Seaward from the vegetation line is a region of mud flats, shallow brown water, and sandbars. Off New Amsterdam, these mud flats extend almost 25 kilometres (16 mi). The sandbars and shallow water are a major impediment to shipping, and incoming vessels must partially unload their cargoes offshore in order to reach the docks at Georgetown and New Amsterdam.

A line of swamps forms a barrier between the white sandy hills of the interior and the coastal plain. These swamps, formed when water was prevented from flowing onto coastal croplands by a series of dams, serve as reservoirs during periods of drought.

Share of forest area in total land area, top countries (2021). Guyana has the second highest percentage of forest cover in the world.

The white sand belt lies south of the coastal zone. This area is 150 to 250 kilometers wide and consists of low sandy hills interspersed with rocky outcroppings. The white sands support a dense hardwood forest. These sands cannot support crops, and if the trees are removed erosion is rapid and severe. Most of Guyana's reserves of bauxite, gold, and diamonds are found in this region.

The largest of Guyana's three geographical regions is the interior highlands, a series of plateaus, flat-topped mountains, and savannahs that extend from the white sand belt to the country's southern borders. The Pacaraima Mountains dominate the western part of the interior highlands. In this region are found some of the oldest sedimentary rocks in the Western Hemisphere. Mount Roraima, on the Venezuelan border, is part of the Pakaraima range and, at 2,762 metres or 9,062 feet, is Guyana's tallest peak. Farther south lies the Kaieteur Plateau, a broad, rocky area about 600 metres or 2,000 feet in elevation; the 1,000-metre (3,300 ft) high Kanuku Mountains; and the low Acarai Mountains situated on the southern border with Brazil.

Much of the interior highlands consist of grassland. The largest expanse of grassland, the Rupununi Savannah, covers about 15,000 square kilometres or 5,800 square miles in southern Guyana. This savannah also extends far into Venezuela and Brazil. The part in Guyana is split into northern and southern regions by the Kanuku Mountains. The sparse grasses of the savannah in general support only grazing, although Amerindian groups cultivate a few areas along the Rupununi River and in the foothills of the Kanuku Mountains.

== Hydrology ==
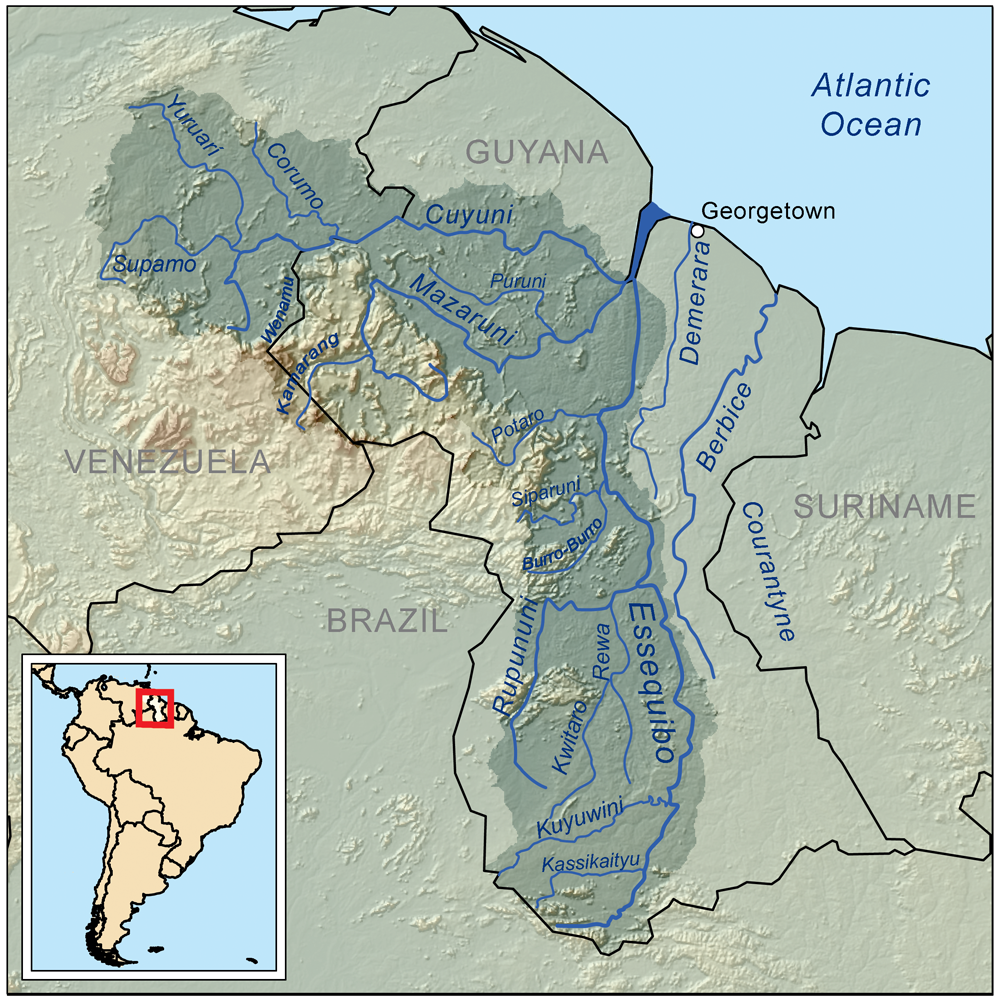
Map of the Essequibo drainage basin

Guyana is a water-rich country. Numerous rivers flow into the Atlantic Ocean, generally in a northward direction. A number of rivers in the western part of the country, however, flow eastward into the Essequibo River, draining the Kaieteur Plateau. The Essequibo, the country's major river, runs from the Brazilian border in the south to a wide delta west of Georgetown. The rivers of eastern Guyana cut across the coastal zone, making east–west travel difficult, but they also provide limited water access to the interior.

Waterfalls generally limit water transport to the lower reaches of each river. Some of the waterfalls are spectacular; for example, Kaieteur Falls on the Potaro River drops 226 metres or 741 feet. Other enormous waterfalls are King Edward VIII Falls (256 metres or 840 feet), Kumerau Falls (190 metres or 623 feet), Oshi Falls (160 to 210 metres or 525 to 689 feet). In the country are known to exist more than 200 rapids and more than 70 large waterfalls. Many waterfalls are little known and most are not measured yet, it is possible that there are waterfalls in excess of 300 metres or 980 feet tall.

Drainage throughout most of Guyana is poor and river flow sluggish because the average gradient of the main rivers is only one meter every five kilometers. Swamps and areas of periodic flooding are found in all but the mountainous regions, and all new land projects require extensive drainage networks before they are suitable for agricultural use. The average square kilometer on a sugar plantation, for example, has six kilometers of irrigation canals, eighteen kilometers of large drains, and eighteen kilometers of small drains. These canals occupy nearly one-eighth of the surface area of the average sugarcane field. Some of the larger estates have more than 550 kilometres or 340 miles of canals; Guyana itself has a total of more than 8,000 kilometres or 5,000 miles. Even Georgetown is below sea level and must depend on dikes for protection from the Demerara River and the Atlantic Ocean.

=== Surface waters of Guyana ===
River	Basin size (10^{3} km^{2})		Average discharge (km^{3}/year)	
River	Guyana	Total	Guyana	Total
Berbice	15.8	15.8	14.7	14.7
Courantyne	26	64	16.3	47
Demerara	7.5	7.5	11.6	11.6
Essequibo	115	154.2	148.8	178
Pomeroon	3.9	3.9	5.3	5.3
Other	46.8		44.3	
Guyana	215		241	

== Climate ==
Guyana map of Köppen climate classification.

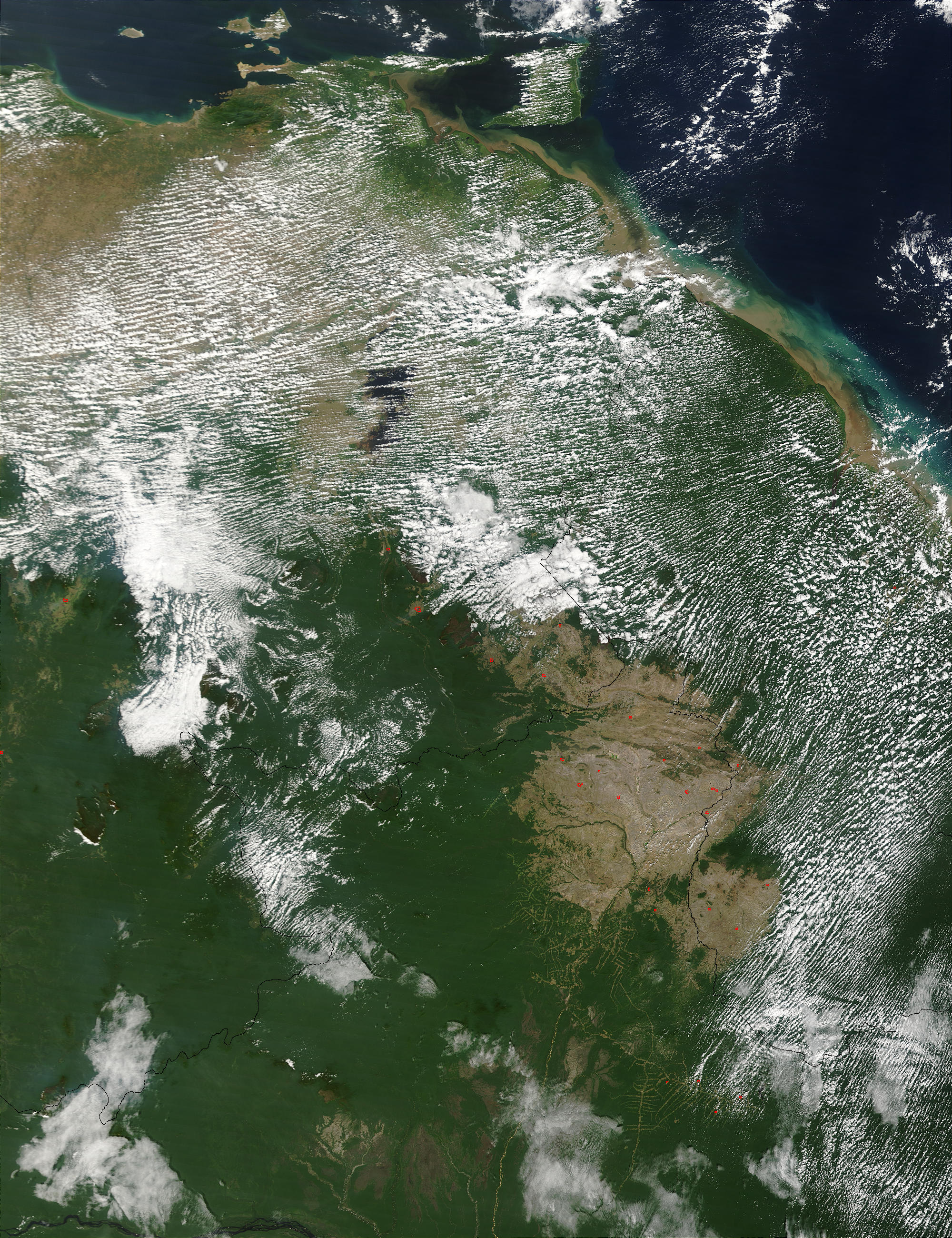
A few scattered fires (red dots) in northern South America: Venezuela (left), Guyana (right) and Brazil (bottom centre)

Guyana has a tropical climate, with two wet seasons (December to early February and from late April to mid-August). Temperatures are consistent throughout the year.

Although the temperature never gets dangerously high, the combination of heat and humidity can at times seem oppressive. The entire area is under the influence of the northeast trade winds, and during the midday and afternoon sea breezes bring relief to the coast. Guyana lies south of the path of Caribbean hurricanes and none are known to have hit the country.

Temperatures in Georgetown are quite constant, with an average high of 32 °C (89.6 °F) and an average low of 24 °C (75.2 °F) in the hottest month (July), and an average range of 29 to 23 °C (84.2 to 73.4 °F) in February, the coolest month. The highest temperature ever recorded in the capital was 34 °C (93 °F) and the lowest 20 °C (68 °F). Humidity averages 70 percent year-round. Locations in the interior, away from the moderating influence of the ocean, experience slightly wider variations in daily temperature, and nighttime readings as low as 12 °C (53.6 °F) have been recorded. Humidity in the interior is also slightly lower, averaging around 60 percent.

Rainfall is heaviest in the northwest and lightest in the southeast and interior. Annual averages on the coast near the Venezuelan border are near 2,500 millimetres (98.4 in), farther east at New Amsterdam 2,000 millimetres (78.7 in), and 1,500 millimetres (59.1 in) in southern Guyana's Rupununi Savannah. Areas on the northeast sides of mountains that catch the trade winds average as much as 3,500 millimetres (137.8 in) of precipitation annually. Although rain falls throughout the year, about 50 percent of the annual total arrives in the summer rainy season that extends from May to the end of July along the coast and from April through September farther inland. Coastal areas have a second rainy season from November through January. Rain generally falls in heavy afternoon showers or thunderstorms. Overcast days are rare; most days include four to eight hours of sunshine from morning through early afternoon.

Climate data for Georgetown (1961–1990)
Month	Jan	Feb	Mar	Apr	May	Jun	Jul	Aug	Sep	Oct	Nov	Dec	Year
Mean daily maximum °C (°F)	28.6 (83.5)	28.9 (84.0)	29.2 (84.6)	29.5 (85.1)	29.4 (84.9)	29.2 (84.6)	29.6 (85.3)	30.2 (86.4)	30.8 (87.4)	30.8 (87.4)	30.2 (86.4)	29.1 (84.4)	29.6 (85.3)
Daily mean °C (°F)	26.1 (79.0)	26.4 (79.5)	26.7 (80.1)	27.0 (80.6)	26.8 (80.2)	26.5 (79.7)	26.6 (79.9)	27.0 (80.6)	27.5 (81.5)	27.6 (81.7)	27.2 (81.0)	26.4 (79.5)	26.8 (80.2)
Mean daily minimum °C (°F)	23.6 (74.5)	23.9 (75.0)	24.2 (75.6)	24.4 (75.9)	24.3 (75.7)	23.8 (74.8)	23.5 (74.3)	23.8 (74.8)	24.2 (75.6)	24.4 (75.9)	24.2 (75.6)	23.8 (74.8)	24.0 (75.2)
Average rainfall mm (inches)	185.2 (7.29)	88.5 (3.48)	111.0 (4.37)	140.5 (5.53)	285.5 (11.24)	327.7 (12.90)	268.0 (10.55)	201.4 (7.93)	97.5 (3.84)	107.2 (4.22)	185.9 (7.32)	261.9 (10.31)	2,260.3 (88.99)
Average rainy days (≥ 1.0 mm)	16	10	10	12	19	23	21	15	9	9	12	18	174
Mean monthly sunshine hours	201.0	208.6	219.7	197.9	178.8	156.7	201.6	233.7	229.8	235.3	210.9	186.6	2,460.6
Source: NOAA

Climate data for Lethem
Month	Jan	Feb	Mar	Apr	May	Jun	Jul	Aug	Sep	Oct	Nov	Dec	Year
Mean daily maximum °C (°F)	32.1 (89.8)	32.2 (90.0)	32.6 (90.7)	32.2 (90.0)	31.7 (89.1)	30.5 (86.9)	30.3 (86.5)	31.1 (88.0)	32.8 (91.0)	33.6 (92.5)	33.1 (91.6)	32.8 (91.0)	32.1 (89.8)
Daily mean °C (°F)	27.4 (81.3)	27.5 (81.5)	27.9 (82.2)	27.8 (82.0)	27.5 (81.5)	26.5 (79.7)	26.4 (79.5)	26.9 (80.4)	28.2 (82.8)	28.7 (83.7)	28.4 (83.1)	28.1 (82.6)	27.6 (81.7)
Mean daily minimum °C (°F)	22.7 (72.9)	22.8 (73.0)	23.2 (73.8)	23.4 (74.1)	23.3 (73.9)	22.6 (72.7)	22.5 (72.5)	22.8 (73.0)	23.6 (74.5)	23.8 (74.8)	23.8 (74.8)	23.4 (74.1)	23.2 (73.7)
Average rainfall mm (inches)	20 (0.8)	28 (1.1)	30 (1.2)	93 (3.7)	268 (10.6)	348 (13.7)	353 (13.9)	225 (8.9)	91 (3.6)	61 (2.4)	60 (2.4)	22 (0.9)	1,599 (63.2)
Source: Climate-Data.org

Climate data for New Amsterdam
Month	Jan	Feb	Mar	Apr	May	Jun	Jul	Aug	Sep	Oct	Nov	Dec	Year
Mean daily maximum °C (°F)	30.1 (86.2)	30.4 (86.7)	30.6 (87.1)	30.4 (86.7)	30.7 (87.3)	30.6 (87.1)	30.8 (87.4)	31.4 (88.5)	31.9 (89.4)	31.8 (89.2)	31.6 (88.9)	30.8 (87.4)	30.9 (87.7)
Daily mean °C (°F)	26.5 (79.7)	26.7 (80.1)	27.0 (80.6)	26.9 (80.4)	27.1 (80.8)	27.0 (80.6)	27.0 (80.6)	27.5 (81.5)	27.9 (82.2)	27.8 (82.0)	27.6 (81.7)	27.1 (80.8)	27.2 (80.9)
Mean daily minimum °C (°F)	23.0 (73.4)	23.1 (73.6)	23.4 (74.1)	23.4 (74.1)	23.5 (74.3)	23.4 (74.1)	23.3 (73.9)	23.6 (74.5)	23.9 (75.0)	23.8 (74.8)	23.7 (74.7)	23.4 (74.1)	23.5 (74.2)
Average rainfall mm (inches)	153 (6.0)	83 (3.3)	90 (3.5)	135 (5.3)	199 (7.8)	225 (8.9)	185 (7.3)	132 (5.2)	64 (2.5)	65 (2.6)	65 (2.6)	174 (6.9)	1,570 (61.9)
Source: Climate-Data.org

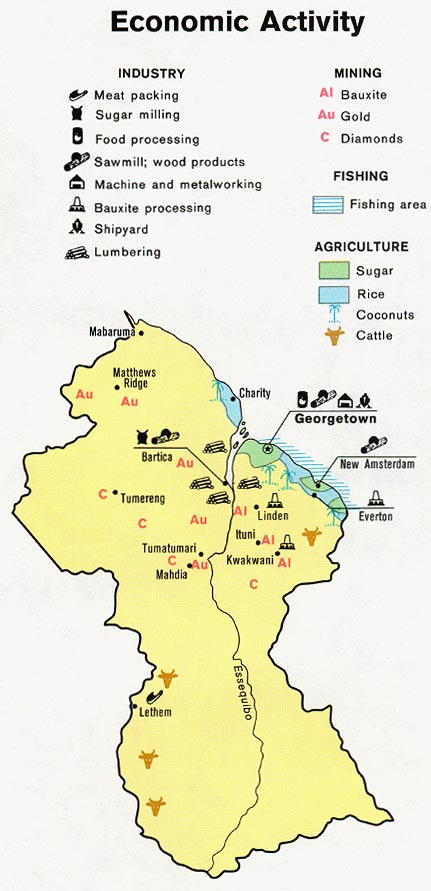
Economic activity map of Guyana

== Forests ==
=== Tree cover extent and loss ===
Global Forest Watch publishes annual estimates of tree cover loss and 2000 tree cover extent derived from time-series analysis of Landsat satellite imagery in the Global Forest Change dataset. In this framework, tree cover refers to vegetation taller than 5 m (including natural forests and tree plantations), and tree cover loss is defined as the complete removal of tree cover canopy for a given year, regardless of cause.

For Guyana, country statistics report cumulative tree cover loss of 376,137 ha (3,761.37 km^{2}) from 2001 to 2024 (about 2.0% of its 2000 tree cover area). For tree cover density greater than 30%, country statistics report a 2000 tree cover extent of 18,996,038 ha (189,960.38 km^{2}). The charts and table below display this data. In simple terms, the annual loss number is the area where tree cover disappeared in that year, and the extent number shows what remains of the 2000 tree cover baseline after subtracting cumulative loss. Forest regrowth is not included in the dataset.

Annual tree cover loss in Guyana, 2001–2024. View chart definition.
Tree cover extent in 2000 minus cumulative tree cover loss in Guyana, 2001–2024 (loss-only residual; does not account for gain). View chart definition.

Annual tree cover extent and loss
Year	Tree cover extent (km2) (Note: This residual measure does not include forest regrowth.)	Annual tree cover loss (km2)
2001	189,859.99	100.39
2002	189,811.72	48.27
2003	189,737.54	74.18
2004	189,696.92	40.62
2005	189,638.60	58.32
2006	189,579.27	59.33
2007	189,526.77	52.50
2008	189,432.17	94.60
2009	189,349.51	82.66
2010	189,248.52	100.99
2011	189,164.89	83.63
2012	189,033.76	131.13
2013	188,962.58	71.18
2014	188,841.04	121.54
2015	188,710.20	130.84
2016	188,445.07	265.13
2017	188,250.74	194.33
2018	188,133.13	117.61
2019	187,909.89	223.24
2020	187,752.19	157.70
2021	187,656.81	95.38
2022	187,551.18	105.63
2023	187,272.36	278.82
2024	186,199.01	1,073.35

=== REDD+ reference levels and monitoring ===
Under the UNFCCC REDD+ framework, Guyana has submitted multiple national reference-level benchmarks. On the UNFCCC REDD+ Web Platform, the 2015 and 2025 submission packages are both listed as having assessed reference levels. The 2015 package lists a national strategy, safeguards information, and a reported national forest monitoring system, while the 2025 package lists the national strategy and safeguards as reported but the forest monitoring system as "not reported".

The first assessed submission, technically assessed in 2015, was a national forest reference emission level (FREL) covering "reducing emissions from deforestation" and "reducing emissions from forest degradation". Using a combined reference level approach based on 2001-2012 data, the assessed FREL was 46,301,251 t CO2 eq per year. The technical assessment states that it included above-ground biomass and below-ground biomass for both activities, plus dead wood for forest degradation, and reported CO2 only.

A second package, technically assessed in 2025, was Guyana's first assessed forest reference level (FRL) and second assessed FREL. Using a 2018-2022 reference period, the modified submission was assessed at 32,695,707 t CO2 eq per year for emissions from deforestation and forest degradation, with an adjustment for national circumstances, and -68,113,829 t CO2 eq per year for removals from conservation of forest carbon stocks and sustainable management of forests. The technical assessment reports that the updated benchmark included above-ground biomass, below-ground biomass, deadwood, litter and soil organic carbon, and included CO2, CH_{4} and N_{2}O.

== Area and boundaries ==
Geographic coordinates
- 5°00′N 59°00′W

Area
- Total: 214,969 square kilometres (83,000 mi^{2})
  - country rank in the world: 83rd
- Land: 196,849 square kilometres (76,004 mi^{2})
- Water: 18,120 square kilometres (7,000 mi^{2})

Area comparative
- Australia comparative: slightly smaller than Victoria
- Canada comparative: slightly more than 1/2 the size of Newfoundland and Labrador
- United Kingdom comparative: approximately 6/7 the size of the United Kingdom
- United States comparative: slightly larger than Kansas; slightly smaller than Idaho
- EU comparative: slightly more than twice the size of Bulgaria

Land boundaries
- Total: 2,933 kilometres (1,822 mi)
- Border countries:
  - Brazil: 1,308 kilometres or 813 miles
  - Suriname: 836 kilometres or 519 miles
  - Venezuela: 789 kilometres or 490 miles

Coastline
- 459 km (285 mi)

Maritime claims
- Territorial sea: 12 nmi (22.2 km; 13.8 mi)
- Exclusive economic zone: 137,765 km^{2} (53,191 mi^{2}) and 200 nmi (370.4 km; 230.2 mi)
- Continental shelf: 200 nmi (370.4 km; 230.2 mi) or to the outer edge of the continental margin

Terrain
- Mostly rolling highlands; low coastal plain; savanna in south.

Elevation extremes
- Lowest point: Atlantic Coast, −1 metre or −3.3 feet
- Highest point: Mount Roraima, 2,762 metres or 9,062 feet

Natural resources
- Bauxite, gold, diamonds, hardwood timber, shrimp, fish.

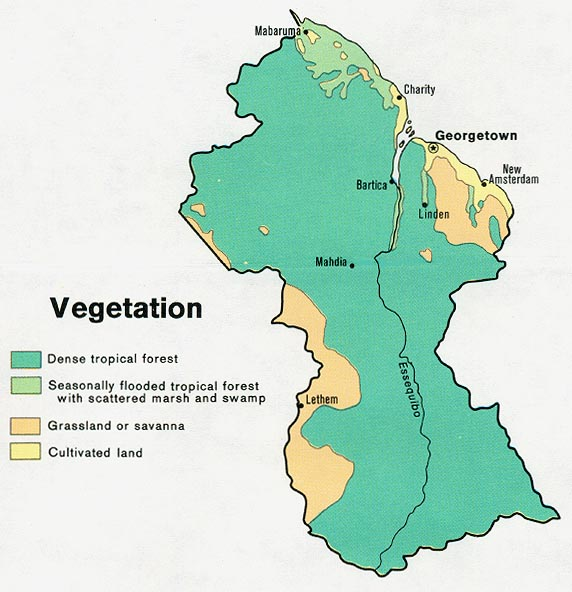
Vegetation map of Guyana

Land use
- Arable land: 2.13%
- Permanent crops: 0.14%
- Other: 97.72%

Irrigated land
- 1,501 square kilometres or 580 square miles (2003)

Total renewable water resources
- 241 cubic kilometres or 58 cubic miles (2011)

Freshwater withdrawal (domestic/industrial/agricultural)
- Total: 1.64 km^{3} (0.39 mi^{3})/yr (.4%/1%/94%)
- Per capita: 2,222 m^{3} (78,500 cu ft)/yr (2010)

Natural hazards
- Flash floods are a constant threat during rainy seasons
- Hurricanes are becoming a threat during summertime

Environment – current issues
- Water pollution from sewage and agricultural and industrial chemicals; deforestation

Environment – international agreements
- Party to:
  - Biodiversity
  - Climate Change
  - Desertification
  - Endangered Species
  - Hazardous Wastes
  - Law of the Sea
  - Ozone Layer Protection
  - Ship Pollution
  - Tropical Timber 83
  - Tropical Timber 94

== Extreme points ==
- Northernmost point – Waini Peninsula, Barima-Waini Region
- Southernmost point – border with Brazil near Wai-Wai, Upper Takutu-Upper Essequibo Region
- Westernmost point – Mount Venamo, border with Venezuela, Cuyuni-Mazaruni Region
- Easternmost point – border with Suriname and Brazil, East Berbice-Corentyne Region
- Highest point – Mount Roraima: 2,835 m
- Lowest point – Atlantic Coast: 0 m

== See also ==
- List of cities in Guyana
- Category:Rivers of Guyana
- Category:Waterfalls of Guyana.
