= Waukauyengtipu =

Mountain in Cuyuni-Mazaruni, Guyana

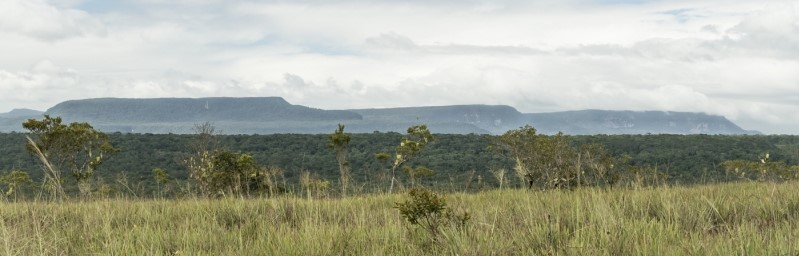
- Massif of Waukauyengtipu photographed from the savannas around Uchii Falls in Guyana

Highest point
- Coordinates: 05°51′00″N 61°11′15″W

Naming
- Etymology: "The mountain of the place of the butterfly"
- Language of name: Arekuna

Geography
- Location: Cuyuni-Mazaruni, Guyana

Waukauyengtipu (or Waukauyeng-tipu, meaning "the mountain of the place of the butterfly" in the local Indigenous Arekuna language) is a mountain in South America situated in most part within the boundaries of the Paruima territory in the Cuyuni-Mazaruni Region of Guyana. The major part of its area is approx. 1,520 metres (4,990 ft) with some areas elevated up to approx. 1800m a.s.l., although its actual elevation has never been accurately measured and as for now can only be estimated from satellite imagery. The plateau belongs to the westernmost area in Guyana and is also one of the highest mountains in the country.

== Biology ==
Cloud forest vegetation is present on Waukauyengtipu on its upper slopes and summit plateau. The plateau hosts typical Pantepui vegetation including large amounts of plants such as Brocchinia tatei, Brocchinia acuminata, Clusia species, Didymiandrum stellatum, and Philodendron insigne.

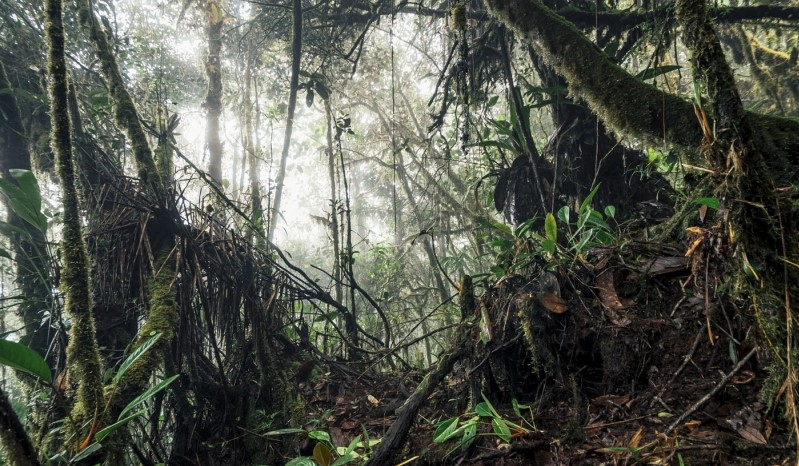
Cloudforest on the summit plateau of Waukauyengtipu

In the central part of the mesa there are scattered occurrences of tepui scrub forests with Bonnetia sessilis and occasional transitions into peat wetlands dominated by Stegolepis ptaritepuiensis. The peat wetlands host other species like Orectanthe sceptrum or Drosera roraimae, making Waukauyengtipu one of just few locations in Guyana where such plants can be observed.

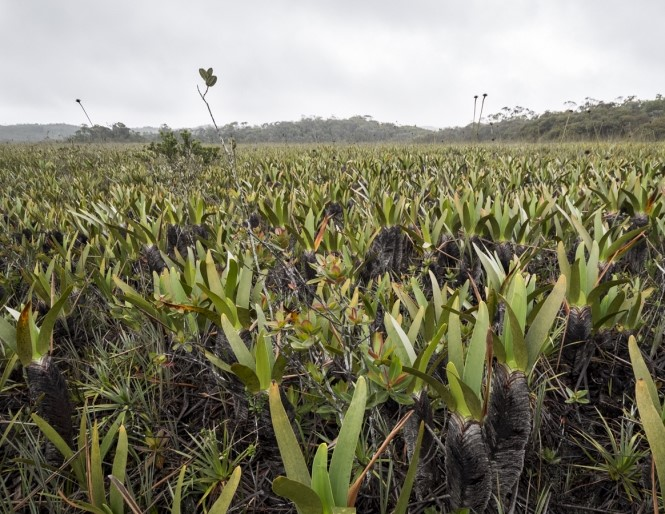
Pantepui peat wetland dominated by Stegolepis ptaritepuiensis plants on the summit plateau of Waukauyengtipu.

== History of exploration ==
The first recorded ascent of the mountain was completed during a Smithsonian botanical expedition led by H. David Clarke between in July 1997, during which extensive herbarium material was collected.

The second successful ascent and short botanical exploration of the summit plateau took place in January 2019.

== Nomenclatural inaccuracies ==
Waukauyengtipu is often mistakenly synonymized with Mount Venamo, yet they are separate plateaus and each should be recognized by their respective, separate names. Most of the information about the true location and elevation of Cerro Venamo are taken from the results of Julian A. Steyermark's and Galfrid Dunsterville's botanical exploration of the mountain in Venezuela in 1963 and 1964. Due to the assumptions regarding the true elevation and area of the massif having been made with only the instrumentation available at that time, some information proves to be inaccurate when compared to modern satellite data. Moreover, the exploration history of both Mount Venamo and Waukauyengtipu is limited to a few overland expeditions and short helicopter landings, all of which had succeeded in studying only isolated, scattered areas of the plateaus. Waukauyengtipu is situated approximately 27 km southeast of Cerro Venamo.
