= Astrothelium rimosum =

Scientific classification
- Kingdom: Fungi
- Division: Ascomycota
- Class: Dothideomycetes
- Order: Trypetheliales
- Family: Trypetheliaceae
- Genus: Astrothelium
- Species: A. rimosum

Binomial name
- Astrothelium rimosum Aptroot (2016)

Species of lichen

Astrothelium rimosum is a species of corticolous (bark-dwelling), crustose lichen in the family Trypetheliaceae. Found in Guyana and Colombia, it was formally described as a new species in 2016 by Dutch lichenologist André Aptroot. The type specimen was collected by Harrie Sipman in Kaieteur National Park (Potaro-Siparuni region, Guyana) at an altitude of 400 m (1,300 ft); there, in a sclerophyllous forest, it was found growing on smooth tree bark. The lichen has an olive-green to yellowish-green thallus with a thick, hyaline cortex (but lacking a prothallus), and a yellow medulla. The thallus texture is chinked and fissured (rimose); its species epithet rimosum alludes to this characteristic. the lichen covers areas of up to 9 cm (3.5 in) in diameter. Its thallus and medulla contain an anthraquinone that results in a K+ (red) chemical spot test. The combination of characteristics of the lichen that distinguish it from others in Astrothelium are the external and internal yellow pigment of its ascomata, and the form and dimensions of its ascospores (110–150 μm long by 30–37 μm broad with between 7 and 11 septa).
