= Astrothelium zebrinum =

Scientific classification
- Kingdom: Fungi
- Division: Ascomycota
- Class: Dothideomycetes
- Order: Trypetheliales
- Family: Trypetheliaceae
- Genus: Astrothelium
- Species: A. zebrinum

Binomial name
- Astrothelium zebrinum Aptroot (2016)

Species of lichen

Astrothelium zebrinum is a species of corticolous (bark-dwelling) lichen in the family Trypetheliaceae. Found in Brazil and Guyana, it was formally described as a new species in 2016 by André Aptroot. The type specimen was collected in a sclerophyllous forest near the airstrip of Kaieteur Falls National Park (Potaro-Siparuni region, Guyana). Characteristics of the lichen include its fused ostioles, lack of lichen products, and ascospores that have seven septa and dimensions of 14–28 μm wide by 60–70 μm long. A year after its original description, the species was recorded from the Brazilian Amazon.
