= Brocchinia uaipanensis =

Scientific classification
- Kingdom: Plantae
- Clade: Tracheophytes
- Clade: Angiosperms
- Clade: Monocots
- Clade: Commelinids
- Order: Poales
- Family: Bromeliaceae
- Subfamily: Brocchinioideae
- Genus: Brocchinia
- Species: B. uaipanensis

Binomial name
- Brocchinia uaipanensis (Maguire) Givnish

Synonyms
- Ayensua uaipanensis (Maguire) L.B.Sm.; Barbacenia uaipanensis Maguire; Vellozia uaipanensis (Maguire) L.B.Sm.

Genus of plants

Brocchinia uaipanensis is a species of bromeliad (family Bromeliaceae) endemic to southern Venezuela. It has been treated as the sole species in the genus Ayensua under the synonym Ayensua uaipanensis, but Ayensua is now included in Brocchinia. The species was first described in 1957 by Bassett Maguire as Barbacenia uaipanensis.
