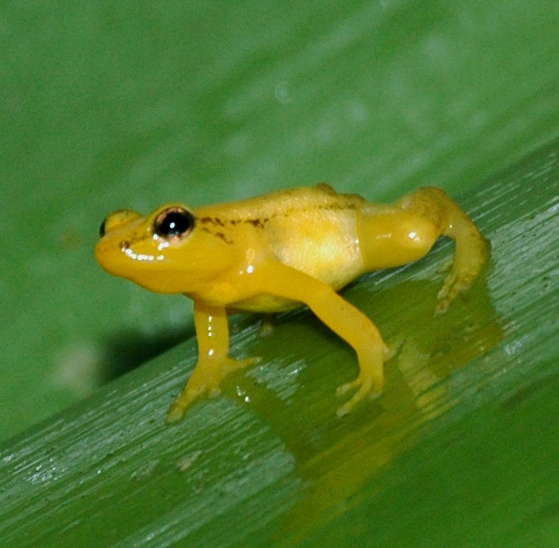

Conservation status
- Endangered (IUCN 3.1)

Scientific classification
- Kingdom: Animalia
- Phylum: Chordata
- Class: Amphibia
- Order: Anura
- Family: Aromobatidae
- Genus: Anomaloglossus
- Species: A. beebei

Binomial name
- Anomaloglossus beebei (Noble, 1923)

Synonyms
- Colostethus beebei (Noble, 1923)

= Anomaloglossus beebei =

Species of amphibian

Anomaloglossus beebei (common names: Beebe's rocket frog, golden rocket frog) is a species of frog in the family Aromobatidae. This frog is endemic to Guyana, specifically in the Kaieteur National Park. It mainly survives on the giant bromeliad called Brocchinia micrantha. The phytotelmata of this bromeliad is the site of oviposition and tadpole rearing and are defended over time by the males. The females of this species are more brightly golden coloured whereas males are more of a dull tan with brown pigmentation. Males take care of offspring and are preferred due to the elongation of their calls.

== Description ==
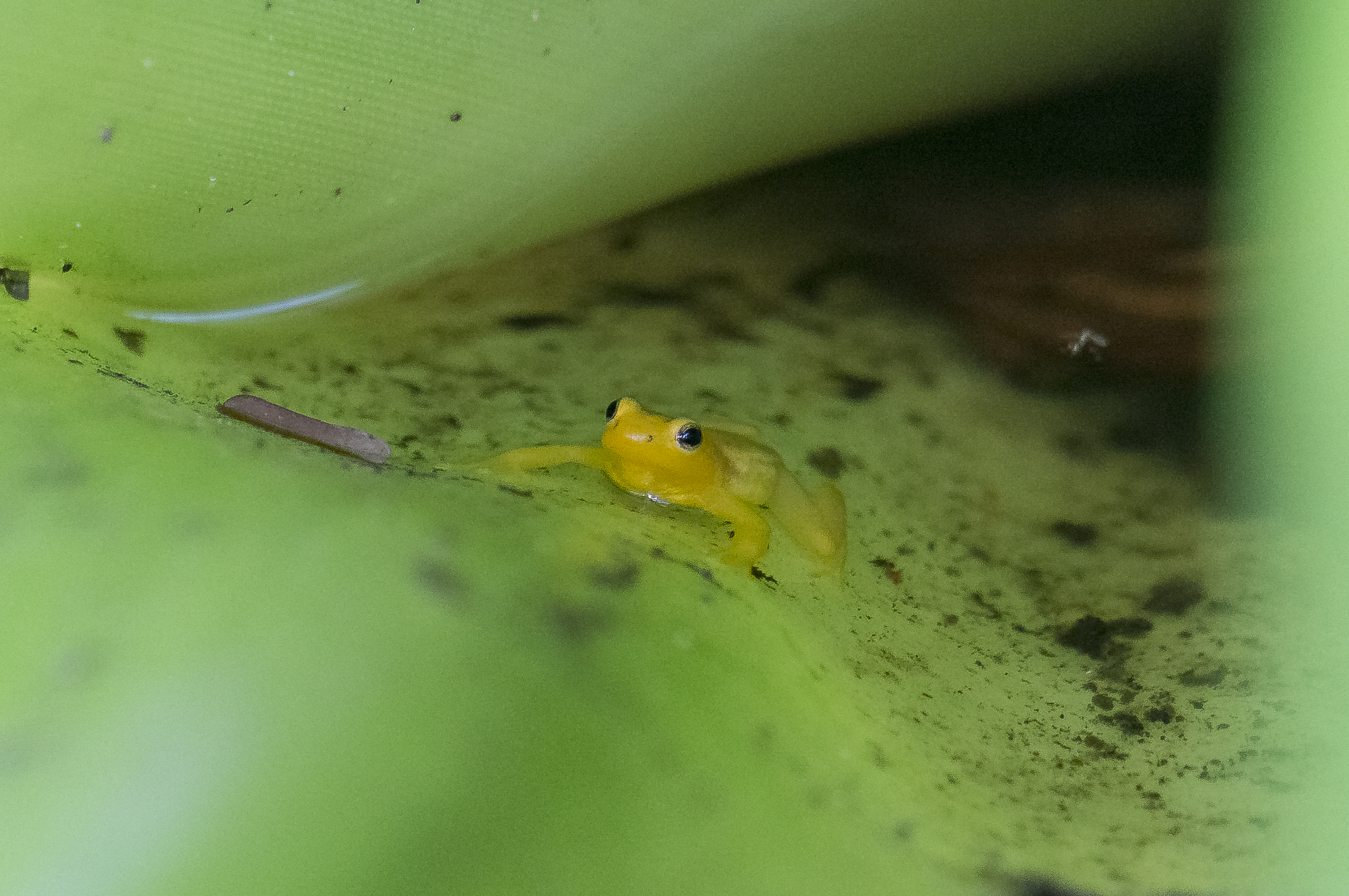
Golden rocket frog seen in Kaieteur Falls taken by Dan Sloan on 10 December 2015, 15:20

A. beebei has granular central skin, and moderate basal toe webbing. The male A. beebei has a snout-vent length maximum of 16.80 mm. This frog has a shorter finger I than finger II and dorsolateral stripes, which help differentiate them from other species. The golden rocket frog species exhibits a rare phenomenon of reverse sexual dichromatism, meaning that the females are showier than the males. In the case of this species, the females are more brightly coloured compared to the males. The females are a bright golden colour, whereas the males tend to be a dull tan with partial brown pigmentation located on their dorsal surface, flanks, and legs. The presence of this brown pigmentation increases when calling. Males have partial brown pigmentation on their dorsal surface, flanks, and legs. Orange colouration development is seen in only sexually mature females. According to some scientists, this bright colouration is not due to aposematic signalling as this species is not poisonous according to some accounts nor is it a form of Batesian mimicry as there are no toxic poison frogs near the site. It is possible that this may be due to the colour being a sex recognition signal, a target of male mate choice, or a form of female dominance or aggression. The colour difference between males and females within this species is possible due to an intraspecific signal. Females are not known to call whereas males are known to call.

Males of this species can be differentiated due to the distinctiveness of the advertisement calls that they make. The feature of call interval and call rate provides the information for there to be distinctiveness as there is extensive variation amongst males. The tadpoles for this species are yellow and larger than the tadpoles of the A. kaiei.."

There are conflicting reports regarding whether this frog is poisonous or not.

The A. beebei and A. roraima species are separated via allopatric speciation.

== Habitat and distribution ==
The golden rocket frog is native and restricted to Guyana, which is in South America. Specifically, this frog is found only on the Kaieteur plateau in the Kaieteur National Park. The species is found at an elevation of around 450 metres. Kaieteur National Park is the region where Brocchinia micrantha, a species of bromeliad flower, is found. The frogs use this plant for living and breeding. The leaves are beneficial as they serve as oviposition and tadpole-rearing sites. The Brocchinia micrantha flowers are able to hold some water from rainwater or mist on the leaves which tend to be utilized by A. beebei. These wells associated with the leaves are called phytotelmata. The water that is accumulated in these microhabitats tends to be acidic and low in dissolved oxygen and conductivity.". Additionally, the density of distribution of the frog is influenced by the Kaieteur Falls. Some researchers believe this is due to the mist produced by these falls.

== Conservation ==
This species is listed as endangered under the IUCN Red List of Threatened Species as it is found only in one location, which is the Kaieteur National Park, and within the park it occupies less than 20 square kilometres.

== Behaviour ==
This species was formerly called Colostethus beebei, is now called Anomaloglossus beebei. Social recognition plays a large role in this species as seen through the presence of the dear enemy effect. This effect mediates neighbour recognition and has been documented in songbirds and other frogs including bullfrogs and olive frogs. Dear enemy effect indicates that there is a behavioural discrimination between individuals, in that there would be a more aggressive response to strangers compared to the response to neighbours. This can be seen through differences in vocal output. In an experiment involving male golden rocket frogs and speakers emitting neighbour calls and non-neighbour calls, the results show that the males approached the non-neighbour call speaker while vocalizing aggressive calls. This effect mediates neighbour recognition and has been documented in songbirds and other frogs including bullfrogs and olive frogs. Some scientists point to the idea that convergent evolution may have occurred as this specific social recognition behaviour is seen in the golden rocket frog, which is a dendrobatid, and in some ranid species of frogs.

== Diet ==
When the tadpoles are in the phytotelm, they will sometimes feed on fallen leaves and microorganisms. Tadpoles tend to obtain nutrients by grazing on algal mats and catching prey in the pools created in the bromeliad. Additionally, sometimes the females lay unfertilized eggs in the phytotelma for the purpose of the eggs to be consumed by the tadpoles for nutritional purposes. It has been observed that larger tadpoles will exhibit cannibalism by eating the smaller tadpoles, however, this is uncommon.

== Reproduction and life cycle ==
Breeding occurs year-round but is the highest from June to August. These months are the rainiest, which is beneficial as it fills up the wells created by the phytotelm with water. Reproduction occurs on the plant. Males defend the phytotelm territory, which allows for the female mate to oviposit. Egg provisioning is preceded by courtship. This species is theorized to exhibit long-term pair bonding. Compared to where tadpole rearing occurred, areas, where oviposition was common, tend to have lower temperatures and leaf angles, less water, more dissolved oxygen, and more crabs. This Neotropical species of frog exhibits biparental care. Males tend to have a higher potential reproductive rate than females as they can care for egg clutches from multiple females. Once females accept the site from the calling male, they remain in the phytotelm. The female tends to deposit about 4-6 eggs near the water line. Soon after, the male transports the tadpoles to another phytotelma. Males moisten eggs by squirting fluid from their cloacae when humidity is low. Female parental care in A. beebei has plasticity. This has been noticed in both laboratory settings and in natural conditions when there is an absence of a male caregiver. Plasticity is shown by the female performing the action of the male, which is transporting the tadpoles. Additionally, mothers can lay trophic eggs while repeatedly visiting offspring.

== Mating ==
=== Female/male interactions ===
This type of frog has different forms of calling meant for different situations. Males use three different types of vocalizations: courtship calls, territorial encounters, and advertisements. When males are in their phytotelmata territory, they try to attract females using long-range advertisement calls. These advertisement calls are composed of three or four high-pitched, short and rapid repeated pulses with 35 millisecond durations. These pulses occur at rates of 10 to 12 pulses per second. Once the females are drawn in, the males use a different form of calling, which is categorized as close-range courtship calls. This call convinces the females to mate with them. About 40% of a male golden rocket frog's energy for activity is used for vocalizations. Males tend to call from their territories for several hours a day Some scientists have concluded that females tend to prefer males with higher call rates, as a high call rate is associated with a good male body condition. Thus, the call rate indirectly provides information regarding a male's resource acquiring and competitive abilities. Other scientists have concluded that the main feature of a call that is looked at by females when determining a mate is the duration of the call. A longer duration of call has been associated with better parental care. Females that respond to the calls are led to multiple phytotelmata by the courting male. In some instances, it was found that the females might leave the male that was calling and look at other sites. These frogs tend to have more acoustic complexity when performing vocalizations meant for mating and courtship compared to when the vocalization is meant for aggressive behaviours.

=== Call differentiation ===
The properties of a male's calling are not correlated to snout-vent length or mass and dominant frequency. It is possible that the calling provides information so that species recognition can occur as there are frogs that are similar and live nearby the golden rocket frog. For example, the Kaiei's rocket frog is closely related to the golden rocket frog and its call is like the advertisement calls of the golden rocket. However, the Kaiei's rocket frog has a call with a lower dominant frequency and pulse rate.

The three calls that the Anomaloglossuss beebei frog produces are advertisement, courtship, and aggressive calls. All three calls include a short period of multiple pulses, but there are also noticeable differences between the calls in different parts of each. The advertisement calls are produced at a high amplitude and have longer individual pulses themselves when compared to the courtship and aggressive calls. The courtship calls were distinguishable by their low frequencies. The aggressive calls included a higher number of pulses for each call and had longer waiting periods between each call produced. The aggressive call even sometimes has one or two beginning pulses before the pulsed call begins.

=== Male/male interactions ===
Males are able to differentiate neighbours of the same species from individuals from another species, which is beneficial. Territorial disputes can occur between males, which results to an escalation to physical aggression. This involves wrestling and chasing that can last for several days. Additionally, the ability to differentiate is important as it indicates the presence of the taxonomically common ability of nonassociative learning, thus allowing for a modulation of the male's aggression.

=== Female/female interactions ===
Females are sometimes aggressive to other females and to males, however it is limited as they are not involved in defending the whole bromeliads like males.

== Predators ==
Predators of golden rocket frog embryos and tadpoles are found in the bromeliads. These predators include the grapsid crab, dragonfly larvae, and spiders found in phytotelmata. These predators were more prevalent in phytotelmata that have lower leaf angles. Grapsid crabs also consume adults. Adults are not defensive towards the crab; however they try to minimize predation risks.
