= Brocchinia hechtioides =

Scientific classification
- Kingdom: Plantae
- Clade: Embryophytes
- Clade: Tracheophytes
- Clade: Spermatophytes
- Clade: Angiosperms
- Clade: Monocots
- Clade: Commelinids
- Order: Poales
- Family: Bromeliaceae
- Genus: Brocchinia
- Species: B. hechtioides

Binomial name
- Brocchinia hechtioides Mez

Synonyms
- Heterotypic Synonyms: Brocchinia cryptantha L.B.Sm.

Species of flowering plant

Brocchinia hechtioides is a species of flowering plant in the family Bromeliaceae. It is native to Colombia, Guyana, andVenezuela. It is one of the two or three members of the genus (the others being B. reducta and possibly B. tatei) that appear to be carnivorous. The leaves form an urn which captures water and also serves as a pitfall trap for insects.
