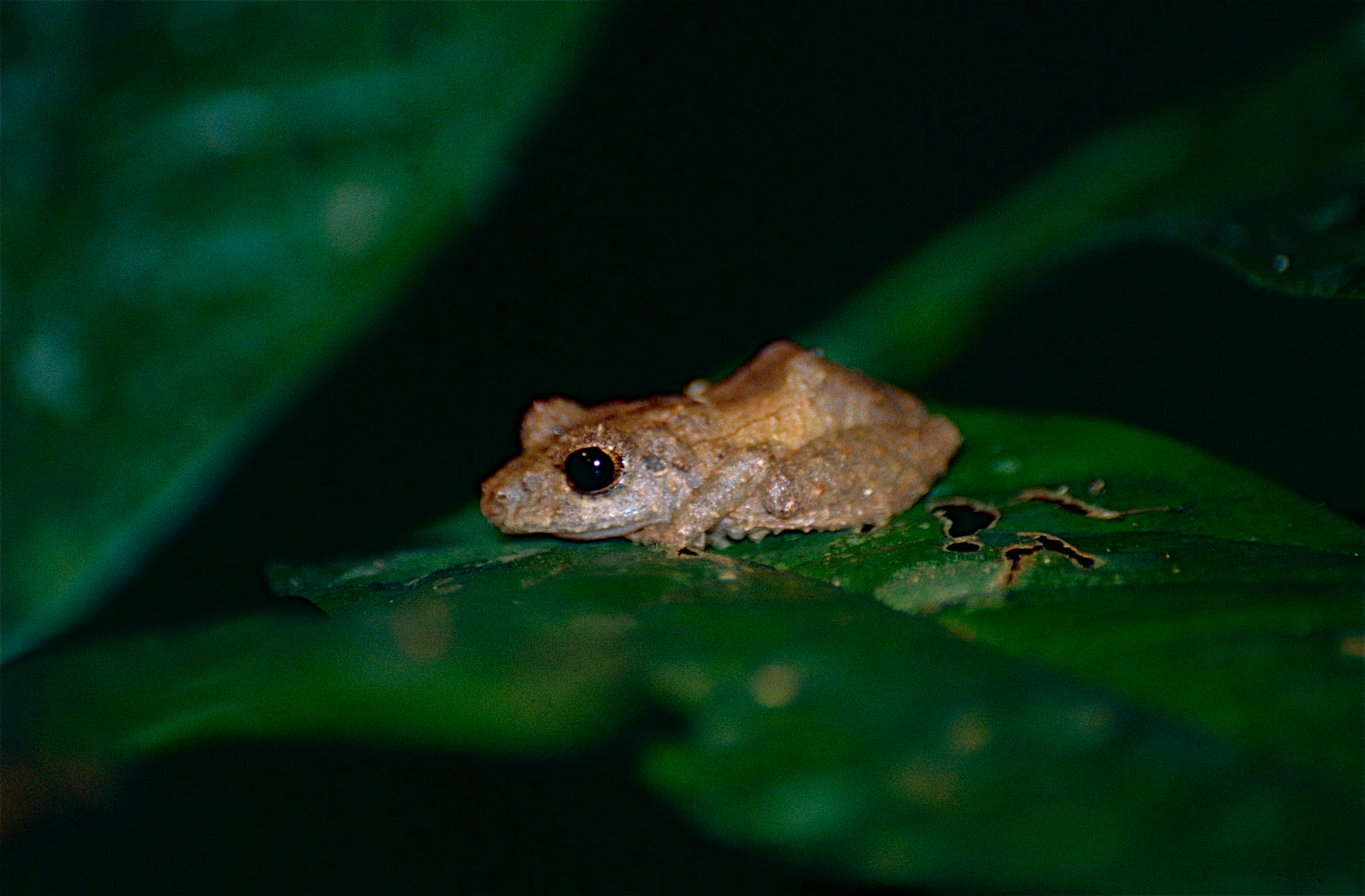
- Rain Frog (Pristimantis inguinalis)

Conservation status
- Least Concern (IUCN 3.1)

Scientific classification
- Kingdom: Animalia
- Phylum: Chordata
- Class: Amphibia
- Order: Anura
- Family: Strabomantidae
- Genus: Pristimantis
- Subgenus: Pristimantis
- Species: P. inguinalis

Binomial name
- Pristimantis inguinalis (Parker, 1940)

Synonyms
- Eleutherodactylus inguinalis Parker, 1940

= Pristimantis inguinalis =

New River robber frog

Species of frog

Pristimantis inguinalis is a species of frog in the family Strabomantidae. It is found in Guyana, Suriname, French Guiana, and northern Brazil (Amapá state). The type locality is New River, in the disputed area claimed by both Guyana and Suriname. Common names New River robber frog and New River South American rain frog have been coined for it.

== Description ==
Adult males measure on average 20.2 mm (0.80 in) in snout–vent length.

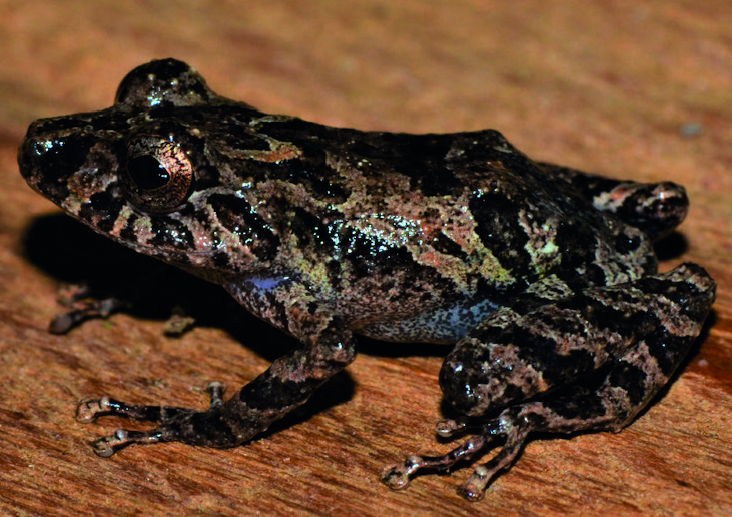
Amapá, Brazil

Specimens from French Guiana have light brown dorsal surface with large brownish black markings. The marking behind the head is W-shaped, and another is a chevron. Supralabial bars are black. Ventral surface is light gray with numerous small black dots (Fouquet et al. describe it as black). There is a yellowish orange spot in the groin. The iris is gray to reddish and has fine, irregular black lines. Specimens from Kaieteur National Park (Guyana) have more variable coloration, with dorsum greenish brown, brown, or dark brown. A dorsolateral stripe may be present. The flecks on ventral surfaces are dark brown or white. The iris can be gold in its upper part, reddish gray in the lower.

The male advertisement call is a single note of about 3 kHz emitted every 3–5 seconds.

== Habitat and conservation ==
Pristimantis inguinalis occurs in primary forests at elevations of 50–700 m (160–2,300 ft) above sea level. It is an arboreal species that lays the eggs underneath the moss on trees, some 3 to 5 m (10 to 16 ft) above the ground. Males call from trees 4–6 m (13–20 ft) above the ground. It is a common species, and no significant threats to it are known. Its range overlaps with several protected areas.
