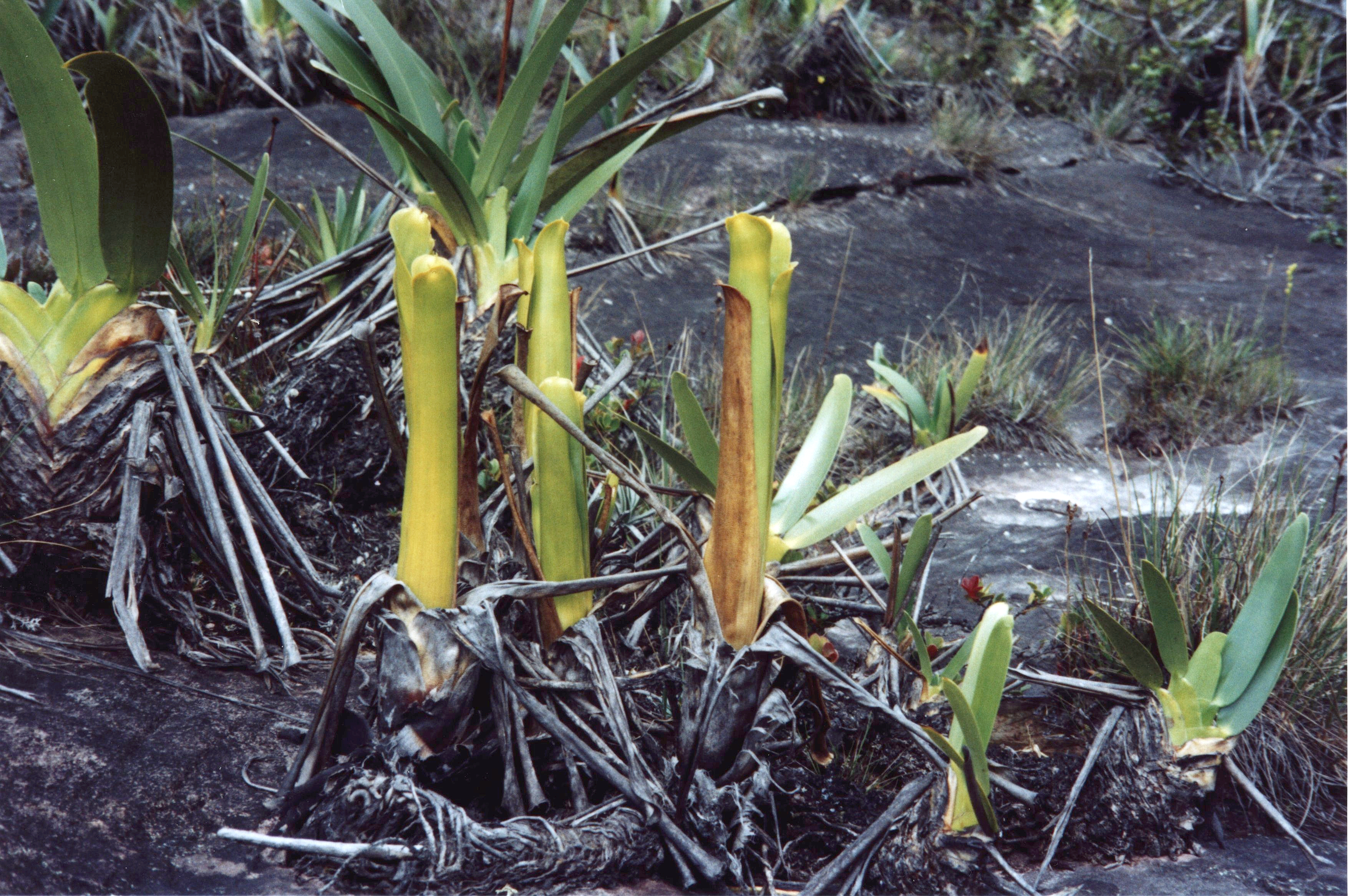
- Brocchinia reducta on Mount Roraima

Scientific classification
- Kingdom: Plantae
- Clade: Tracheophytes
- Clade: Angiosperms
- Clade: Monocots
- Clade: Commelinids
- Order: Poales
- Family: Bromeliaceae
- Genus: Brocchinia
- Species: B. reducta

Binomial name
- Brocchinia reducta Baker 1882
- Brocchinia reducta distribution

= Brocchinia reducta =

Species of carnivorous plant

Brocchinia reducta /brɒˈkɪniə riːˈdʌktə/ is a carnivorous plant in the bromeliad family. It is native to southern Venezuela, Brazil, Colombia, and Guyana, and is found in areas with nutrient-poor, high moisture soil. B. reducta is able to grow in sparse conditions, which is evident when it uses its roots as anchors over rocks. Its funnel-like structure and waxy coating, among other characteristics, suggest that this plant is carnivorous.

== Structure ==
Brocchinia reducta, like many other bromeliads, forms a water-storing cup with its tightly overlapping, bright yellow and green leaves, creating a cylinder when growing outdoors called a rosette. The leaves surrounding the cup of B. reducta are coated with a very loose yet thick wax coat. This coating is highly reflective of ultraviolet light, which also protects the plant from harmful rays. Since many insects are attracted to ultraviolet (it is also reflected by many flowers), this is an efficient lure. The water in the cup also emits a sweet odor, which may serve to attract ants and other insects. However, several studies have determined that the reflective wax coating serves mainly to cause insects to slip into the water cup below. Once trapped, it is nearly impossible for insects to crawl out of the steep slippery leaves; they eventually drown.

== Carnivorous behavior ==
B. reducta still has many unknowns and is debated among some biologists as to if it truly qualifies to be called a carnivore. However, what is known suggests that it qualifies as a carnivorous bromeliad, along with Brocchinia hechtioides and Catopsis beteroniana. Its waxy surface, water collection, odor emission, and potential digestive enzymes within the pool of water all point to a passive pitfall trap. In addition, B. reducta leaves are covered in trichomes that are able to absorb nutrients. Its trichomes, located on the outer cell wall, can transport molecules as small as 6.6 nm.

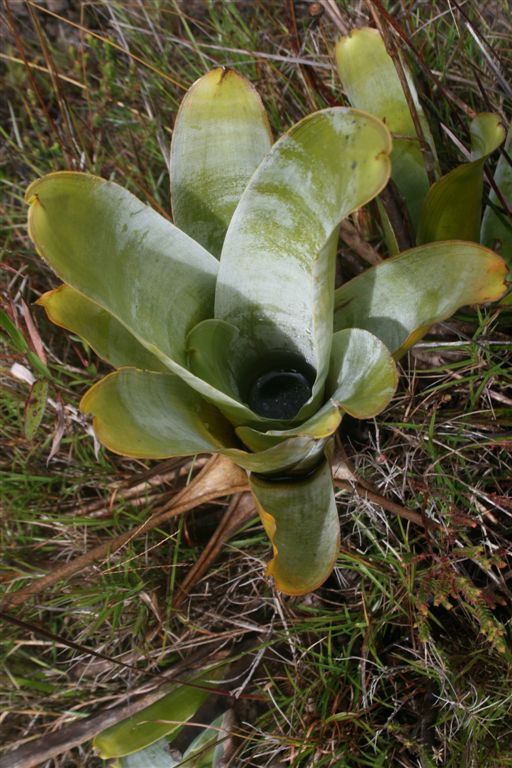
Looking down the waxy rosette of a B. reducta specimen displaying looser-packed leaves

== Commercial use ==
B. reducta has been sold commercially on several carnivorous plant websites as a carnivorous specimen that people can own at home. However, there is potential for a large difference in a B. reducta specimen that is grown in its natural habitat than one sold and grown commercially. Where a natural growth specimen is bright yellow green, a B. reducta grown without its normal light exposure can be darker shades of green. Additionally, the leaves will grow less condensed, and the plant will not reach its natural height.

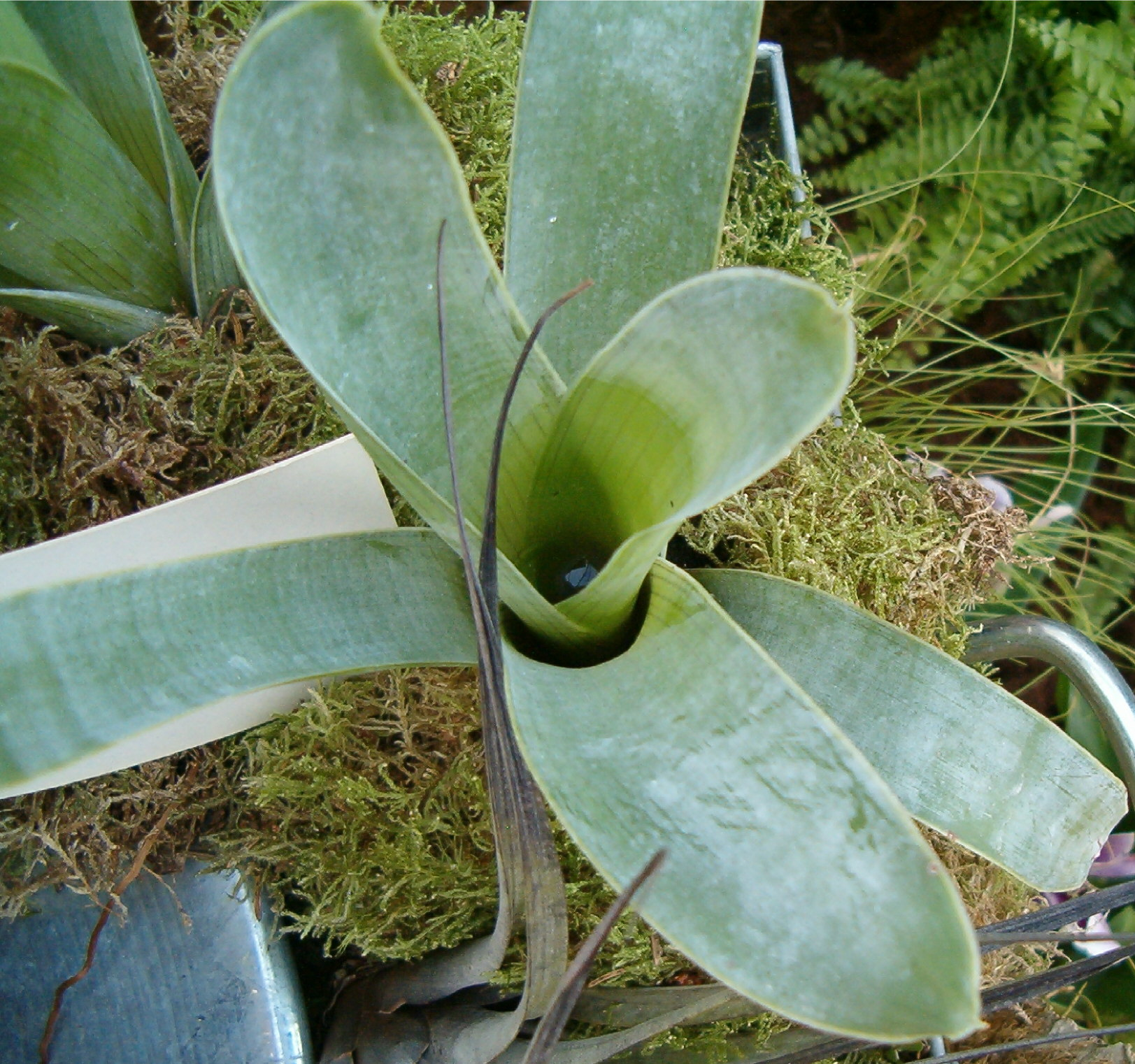
B. reducta grown outside of its natural habitat, showing looser leaves and darker pigment
