= Brocchinia steyermarkii =

Scientific classification
- Kingdom: Plantae
- Clade: Tracheophytes
- Clade: Angiosperms
- Clade: Monocots
- Clade: Commelinids
- Order: Poales
- Family: Bromeliaceae
- Genus: Brocchinia
- Species: B. steyermarkii

Binomial name
- Brocchinia steyermarkii L.B.Sm.

Species of flowering plant

Brocchinia steyermarkii is a species of plant in the genus Brocchinia. This species is native to Venezuela and Guyana.
