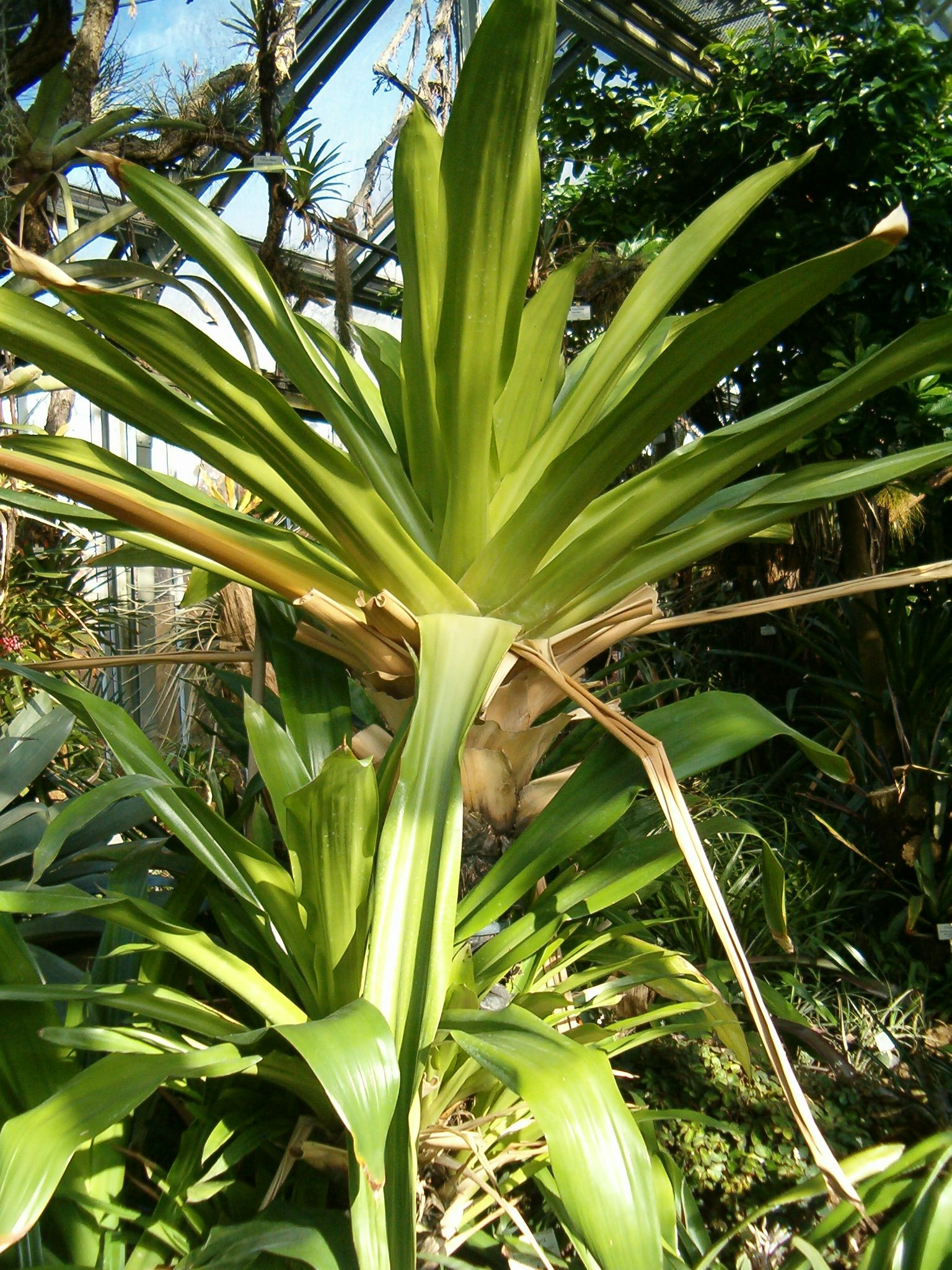

Scientific classification
- Kingdom: Plantae
- Clade: Tracheophytes
- Clade: Angiosperms
- Clade: Monocots
- Clade: Commelinids
- Order: Poales
- Family: Bromeliaceae
- Genus: Brocchinia
- Species: B. micrantha

Binomial name
- Brocchinia micrantha (Baker) Mez

Synonyms
- Cordyline micrantha Baker; Brocchinia cordylinoides Baker; Brocchinia andreana Baker

= Brocchinia micrantha =

Species of plant

Brocchinia micrantha is a South American species of plant, in the genus Brocchinia, of the bromeliad family (Bromeliaceae). This species is native to Venezuela and Guyana. In Venezuela, these plants may be found within Canaima National Park, near to Salto Ángel (Angel Falls), the world’s tallest free-falling waterfall. In Guyana, this plant is commonly found at Kaieteur National Park.

As Brocchinia are a member of the bromeliad family, the funnel-like structure of their leaves will fill with rainwater periodically, thus serving as a shelter and habitat for a variety of vertebrates, invertebrates and microorganisms, with one single plant maintaining its own unique “community” in-miniature. The plants are popular homes for tiny frogs, with their leaf folds of pooling water often serving as nurseries for tadpoles, including from several species of poison dart frog, and notably the golden rocket frog (Anomaloglossus beebei).
