= Brocchinia gilmartiniae =

Scientific classification
- Kingdom: Plantae
- Clade: Tracheophytes
- Clade: Angiosperms
- Clade: Monocots
- Clade: Commelinids
- Order: Poales
- Family: Bromeliaceae
- Genus: Brocchinia
- Species: B. gilmartiniae

Binomial name
- Brocchinia gilmartiniae G.S.Varad.

Species of flowering plant

Brocchinia gilmartiniae is a species of plant in the genus Brocchinia. This species is endemic to the State of Bolívar in southeastern Venezuela. It is named for US botanist Amy Jean Gilmartin (1932-1989).
