= Brocchinia paniculata =

Scientific classification
- Kingdom: Plantae
- Clade: Tracheophytes
- Clade: Angiosperms
- Clade: Monocots
- Clade: Commelinids
- Order: Poales
- Family: Bromeliaceae
- Genus: Brocchinia
- Species: B. paniculata

Binomial name
- Brocchinia paniculata Schultes f.

Synonyms
- Pitcairnia brocchinia D.Dietr

Species of flowering plant

Brocchinia paniculata is a species of plant in the genus Brocchinia. This species is native to Colombia and Venezuela.
