= Mount Venamo =

Mountain in Venezuela and Guyana

Highest point
- Elevation: 1,890 m (6,200 ft)
- Coordinates: 5.977°N 61.396°W

Geography
- Location: Guyana – Venezuela border

Mount Venamo (Spanish: Cerro Venamo) is a mountain in South America that forms part of the international boundary between Guyana and Venezuela. The mountain is 1,890 metres (6,200 ft) high and is the westernmost point in Guyana. The mountain is named after the Venamo River, which flows nearby. It is often wrongly synonymized with Waukauyengtipu, a different tabletop mountain within the territory of Guyana, situated approximately 25 km (16 mi) southeast of Mount Venamo.

== Nomenclatural inaccuracies ==
A mountain in Guyana named Waukauyengtipu is often mistakenly synonymized with Mount Venamo, yet they are separate plateaus and each should be recognized by their respective, separate names. Most of the information about the true location and elevation of Cerro Venamo is taken from the results of Julian A. Steyermark's and G. C. K. Dunsterville's botanical exploration of the mountain in Venezuela in 1963 and 1964. Due to the assumptions regarding the geography of the massif having been made with only the instrumentation available at that time, some information, especially its area and elevation, has proven to be inaccurate when compared to modern satellite data. Waukauyengtipu is situated approximately 27 km (17 mi) southeast of Cerro Venamo.
