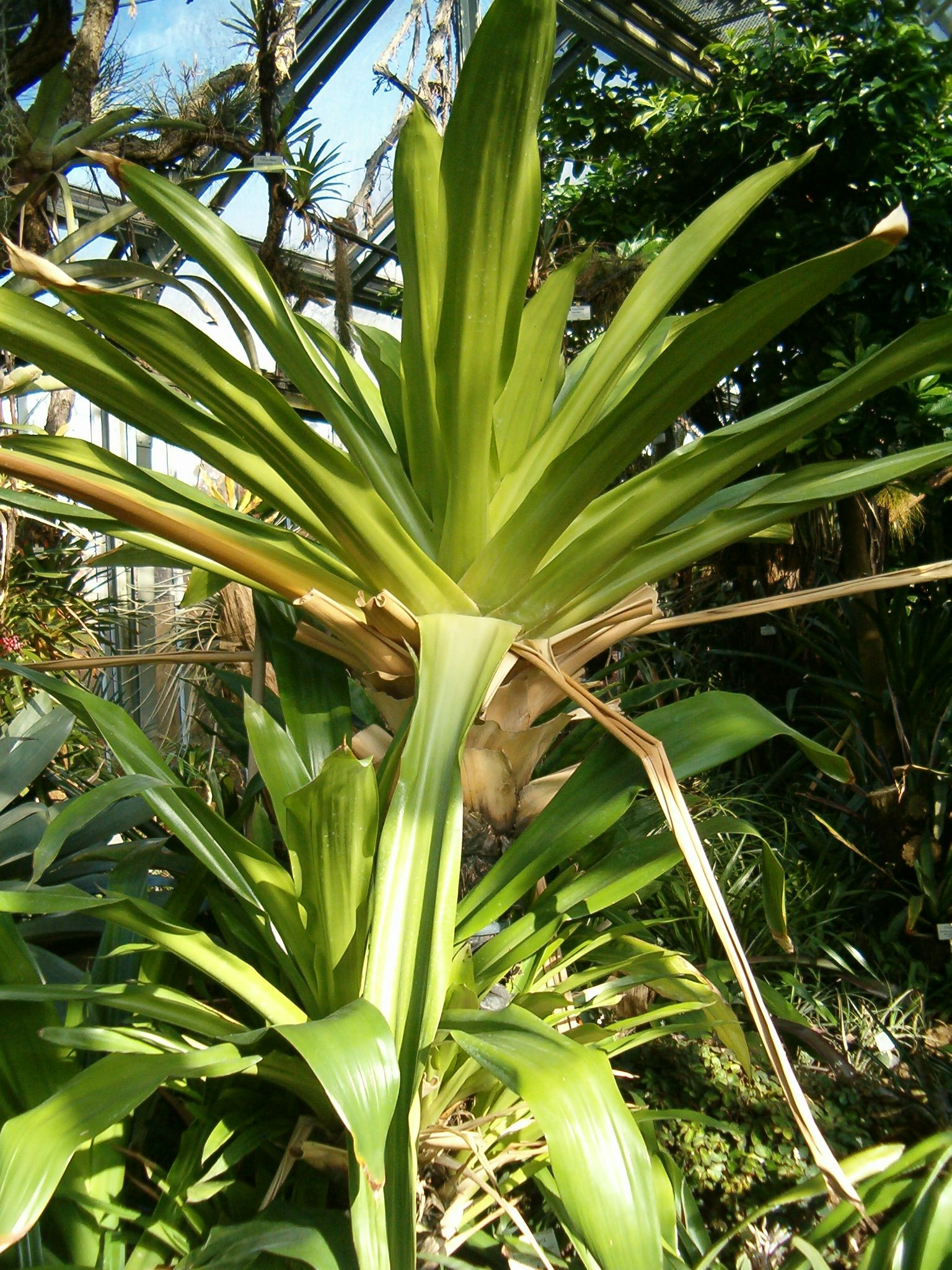
- Brocchinia micrantha

Scientific classification
- Kingdom: Plantae
- Clade: Embryophytes
- Clade: Tracheophytes
- Clade: Spermatophytes
- Clade: Angiosperms
- Clade: Monocots
- Clade: Commelinids
- Order: Poales
- Family: Bromeliaceae
- Subfamily: Brocchinioideae; Givnish
- Genus: Brocchinia; J.H.Schult. ex J.A.Schult. & J.H.Schult. (1830)

Synonyms
- Sequencia Givnish

= Brocchinia =

Genus of carnivorous plants

Brocchinia is a genus of the botanical family Bromeliaceae, and is the sole genus of the subfamily Brocchinioideae, containing 20 species. The genus is named after Giovanni Battista Brocchi, Italian naturalist (1772–1826). Brocchinia species are native primarily to the ancient Guayana Shield in southern Venezuela and Guyana, with some species extending into Colombia and northern Brazil. Its species are generally restricted to areas of sand and sandstone of the Roraima Formation; a few occur on granite.

Based on chloroplast DNA sequence variation, Brocchinia appears to be sister to all other bromeliads. Calibration of the molecular family tree of bromeliads against the known ages of various fossil monocots suggests that Brocchinia lineage diverged from other bromeliads nearly 20 million years ago, and that some of the living species of Brocchinia began diverging from each other soon thereafter. The next lineage to diverge from other bromeliads included Lindmania and Connellia, which are also endemic to the Guayana Shield; at least one other subfamily Navioideae is also almost entirely restricted to that region. Consequently, it is quite likely that the family as a whole arose in the Guayana Shield. Previously, Brocchinia was thought to be a member of the bromeliad subfamily Pitcairnioideae, based on its possession of winged seeds like those seen in other members of that group. This view has now been overturned after the recognition that Pitcairnioideae as originally circumscribed more than a century ago represents several morphologically similar but independently derived groups that share only ancestral (plesiomorphic) characters, not true synapomorphies (shared derived characters).

Brocchinia has undergone a spectacular adaptive radiation in mechanisms of nutrient capture, apparently in response to the unusually infertile, heavily leached substrates of the Guayana Shield. At least two species, B. reducta and B. hechtioides, appear to be carnivorous. Like most species of Brocchinia – and indeed, of many other bromeliad genera – these two species impound rain water in a tank formed by tightly overlapping leaves arranged in a basal rosette. In these species, however, the leaves are nearly vertical, their inner surfaces are covered with fine wax that readily exfoliates, the tank fluid is highly acid (pH c. 3.0) and emits a sweet, nectar-like odor, and the tank itself is full of the dead remains of ants (B. reducta) or bees and wasps (B. hechtioides). Recently, it has been shown that at least B. reducta secretes a phosphatase into its tanks.

Another species, Brocchinia acuminata, is ant-fed myrmecophyte, apparently depending in part on nutrients and dead nestmates dropping into the tank from ants that live among the swollen, achlorophyllous leaf bases. The facultative epiphyte B. tatei, and the tree-like B. micrantha up to 8 m (26 ft) in height with its massive, gutter-like leaf axils that hold liters of rainwater, capture a great deal of falling vegetable debris. One terrestrial population of B. tatei was discovered with heterocystous cyanobacteria in its tanks, suggesting nitrogen fixation.

The earliest divergent members of the genus – including Brocchinia prismatica in the Prismatica clade, and such species as B. melanacra and B. vestita in the Maguirei clade – lack tanks entirely and appear to depend solely on soil nutrients. Acquisition of the tank habit seems likely to have been the key innovation driving the evolution of specialized mechanisms of nutrient capture in Brocchinia, and is associated with thin leaf cross-sections and the later evolution of carnivory, ant-fed myrmecophily, epiphytism, and N fixation in the Acuminata and Reducta clades. Each of the nutritionally specialized species have relatively large areas of live trichomes on the leaf bases that can absorb amino acids at high rates. Tanks and absorptive trichomes were later lost secondarily in Brocchinia steyermarkii, a terrestrial species common in wet sandy areas in the Gran Sabana. Brocchinia melanacra is especially adapted to ground fires, with highly sclerotized leaf tips that protect that single bud in unexpanded leaves but appear to be useless (often dangling limply in the breeze) in fully expanded leaves. Brocchinia serrata, a highly aberrant taxon with tough, serrate leaves that is found only on a few mesetas in Colombia, has now been shown to be completely unrelated and has been described as the sole member of a new genus Sequencia, with its name reflecting its initial recognition based on DNA sequence data. The ecology of the dwarf species Brocchinia cataractarum, B. delicatula, and B. rupestris, remain enigmatic.

== Species ==
As of November 2022, Plants of the World Online accepted the following species:

- Brocchinia acuminata L.B.Sm.
- Brocchinia amazonica L.B.Sm.
- Brocchinia cataractarum (Sandwith) B.Holst
- Brocchinia cowanii L.B.Sm.
- Brocchinia delicatula L.B.Sm.
- Brocchinia gilmartiniae G.S.Varad.
- Brocchinia hechtioides Mez
- Brocchinia hitchcockii L.B.Sm.
- Brocchinia maguirei L.B.Sm.
- Brocchinia melanacra L.B.Sm.
- Brocchinia micrantha (Baker) Mez
- Brocchinia paniculata Schult. & Schult.f.
- Brocchinia prismatica L.B.Sm.
- Brocchinia reducta Baker
- Brocchinia rupestris (Gleason) B.Holst
- Brocchinia steyermarkii L.B.Sm.
- Brocchinia tatei L.B.Sm.
- Brocchinia vestita L.B.Sm.
- Brocchinia wurdackiana B.Holst
