= King Edward VIII Falls =

Waterfall in Guyana

Coordinates: 5°29′10″N 59°47′53″W

King Edward VIII Falls is an 260-metre-tall (850 ft) single plunge waterfall found on the Semang River in the Cuyuni-Mazaruni highlands, named for King Edward VIII.

Waterfall has formed on the escarpment of Pacaraima Mountains and has eroded the Precambrian quartzite and conglomerate, forming an amphitheatre.

Falls was noted by explorer Paul A. Zahl in 1935 and a photograph of the falls is found in his book, "To the Lost World". This remote area is seldom visited.

This waterfall often is confused with another waterfall - a lengthy set of rapids on the New River (itself a major tributary to the Corentyne River) named King Edward VI Falls (not to be confused with King George VI Falls, a tall plunge near the Venezuelan border). There are several falls in Guyana that are named after British kings and this has created some long standing confusion.

== See also ==
- List of waterfalls
