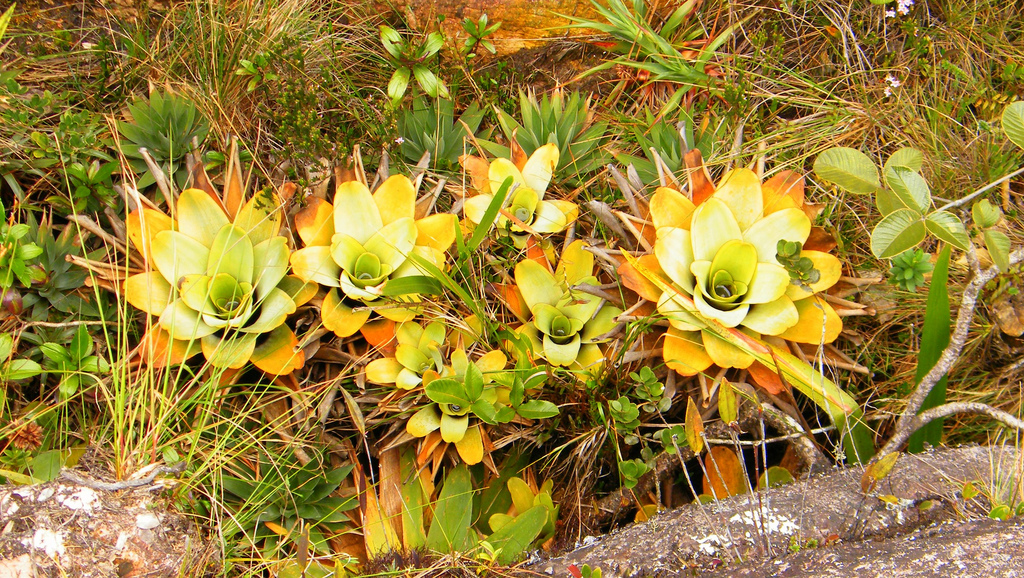
- Brocchinia tatei on Mount Roraima

Scientific classification
- Kingdom: Plantae
- Clade: Tracheophytes
- Clade: Angiosperms
- Clade: Monocots
- Clade: Commelinids
- Order: Poales
- Family: Bromeliaceae
- Genus: Brocchinia
- Species: B. tatei

Binomial name
- Brocchinia tatei L.B.Sm.

Synonyms
- Brocchinia secunda L.B.Sm.; Brocchinia oliva-estevae Steyerm. & L.B.Sm.

= Brocchinia tatei =

Species of epiphyte

Brocchinia tatei is a species of plant in the genus Brocchinia. This species is native to Venezuela and Guyana.
