= Kaieteur Falls =

Waterfall in the Essequibo

Kaieteur
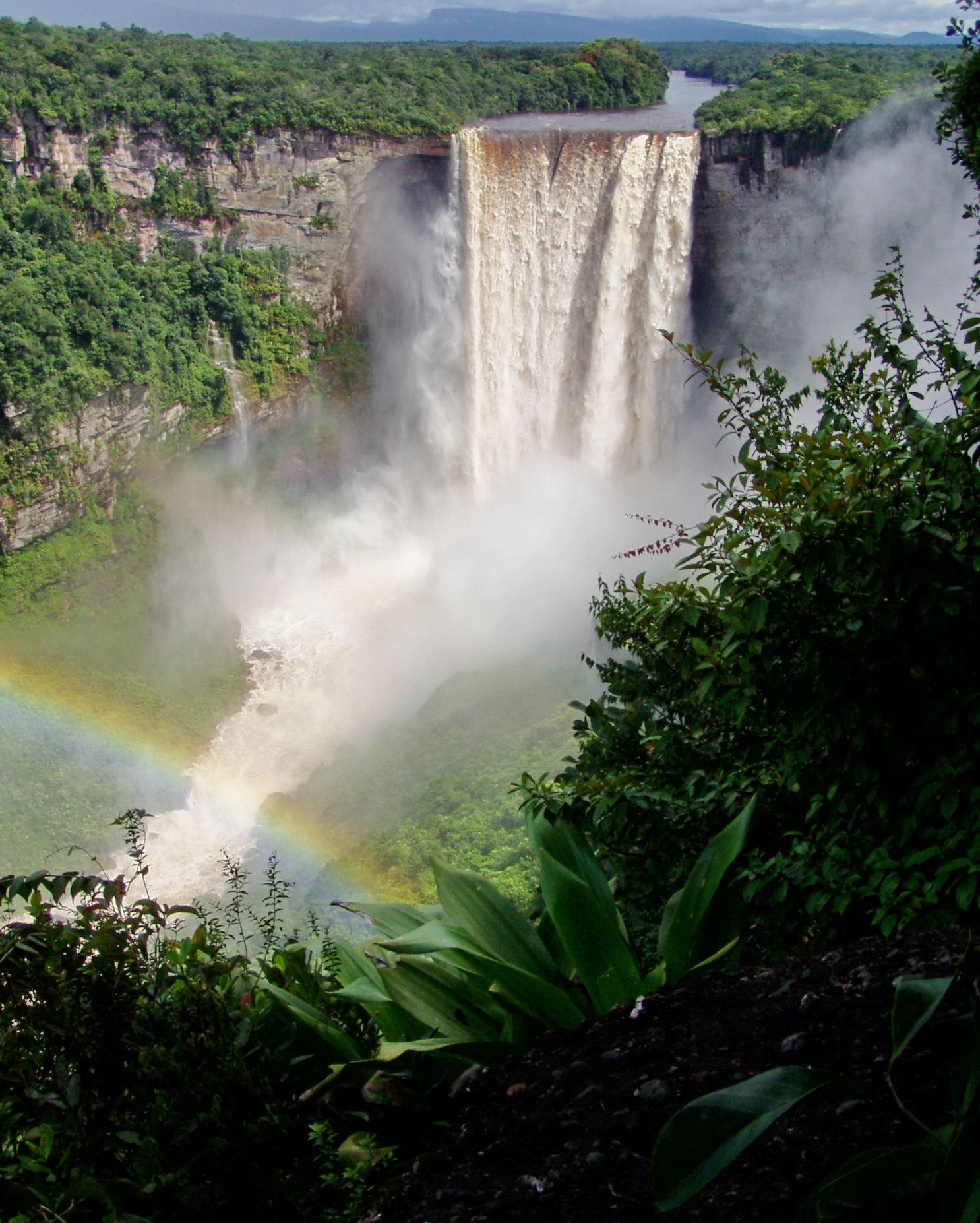
- Kaieteur, Guyana, in rainy season 2004

- Interactive map of Kaieteur
- Location: Guyana
- Coordinates: 5°10′30″N 59°28′49.8″W
- Type: Plunge
- Total height: 741 ft (226 m)
- Number of drops: 1 (highest flow single drop waterfall of the world)
- Longest drop: 741 ft (226 m)
- Average width: 371 ft (113 m)
- Watercourse: Potaro River
- Average flow rate: 660 m^{3}/s (23,000 cu ft/s)
- World height ranking: 123

Kaieteur Falls is one of the most powerful single-drop waterfalls in the world. It is located on the Potaro River in Kaieteur National Park, central Essequibo Territory, Guyana. It is 226 metres (741 ft) high when measured from its plunge over a sandstone and conglomerate cliff to the first break. It then flows over a series of steep cascades that, when included in the measurements, bring the total height to 251 metres (822 ft). While many falls have greater height or greater flow, few have the combination of height and water volume, and Kaieteur is among the most powerful waterfalls in the world with an average flow rate of 663 cubic meters per second (23,400 cubic feet per second). Kaieteur Falls is about four and a half times the height of Niagara Falls, on the border between Canada and the United States, and about twice the height of Victoria Falls, on the border of Zambia and Zimbabwe in Africa.

Upriver from the falls, the Potaro Plateau stretches out to the distant escarpment of the Pakaraima Mountains. The Potaro River empties into the Essequibo River which is the 34th longest river in South America and the longest river in Guyana.

== History and discovery ==
Long known about by Indigenous nations in the area, the falls were noticed by Europeans in 1870 by a party led by Charles Barrington Brown, a British geologist appointed as a government surveyor to the colony of British Guiana. Brown and his partner James Sawkins had arrived in Georgetown in 1867; they worked both together and independently, which resulted in Brown discovering the falls alone. He did not have time to investigate Kaieteur Falls closely, so he returned one year later to make comprehensive measurements. Brown's book Canoe and Camp life in British Guiana was published in 1876. Two years later, in 1878, he published Fifteen Thousand Miles on the Amazon and its tributaries.

According to a Patamona Indian legend, Kaieteur Falls was named for Kuik'tuwuk old man or man, a Toshao (chief) who sacrificed himself. Makonaima is a god for Patomana people so by paddling over the falls to save his people. Another legend though was told to Brown by indigenous people on the night of discovery of the falls. Thus, the fall was named "Kaieteur"(kuik-man, tu'wuk -large place, falls means e'me'lú which means "old-man-fall").

== Tourism ==
Kaieteur Falls is a major tourist attraction in Guyana. It is in Kaieteur National Park in the centre of Guyana's rainforest. The park is served by Kaieteur International Airport, about a 15-minute walk from the top of Kaieteur falls, with frequent flights to Ogle Airport and Cheddi Jagan International Airport in Georgetown.

== Popular culture ==
Kaieteur Falls is featured in:

- the documentary film The White Diamond by Werner Herzog and Animal Planet's River Monsters with Jeremy Wade.
- the science fiction animation television series G Gundam. The lead character trains and bathes under the falls before his final fight.
- the opening of the fourth season credits of the Discovery Channel's series Gold Rush (2013). It also features in the body of a few episodes of that season.
- episode 6 of David Attenborough's series Life on Earth in which the native frogs, which thrive in the moist conditions, are discussed.
- episode 1 of Steve Backshall's series Deadly Adventures where Steve abseils to the bottom and camps overnight.
- the ending of the final episode of the fourth season of River Monsters features the falls.
- Evelyn Waugh's 1934 travel book Ninety-two Days.

== Gallery ==
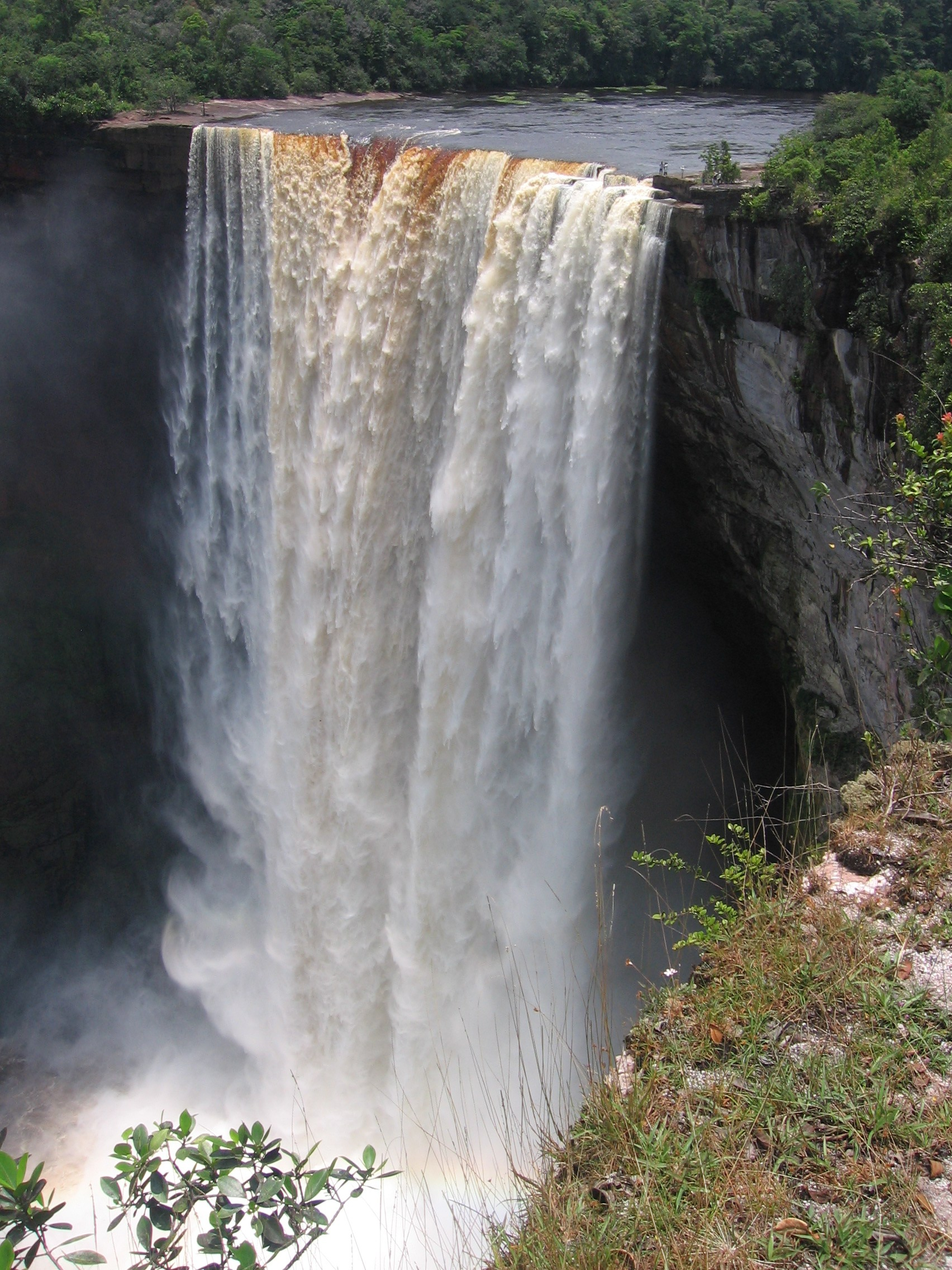
Kaieteur Falls September 2007

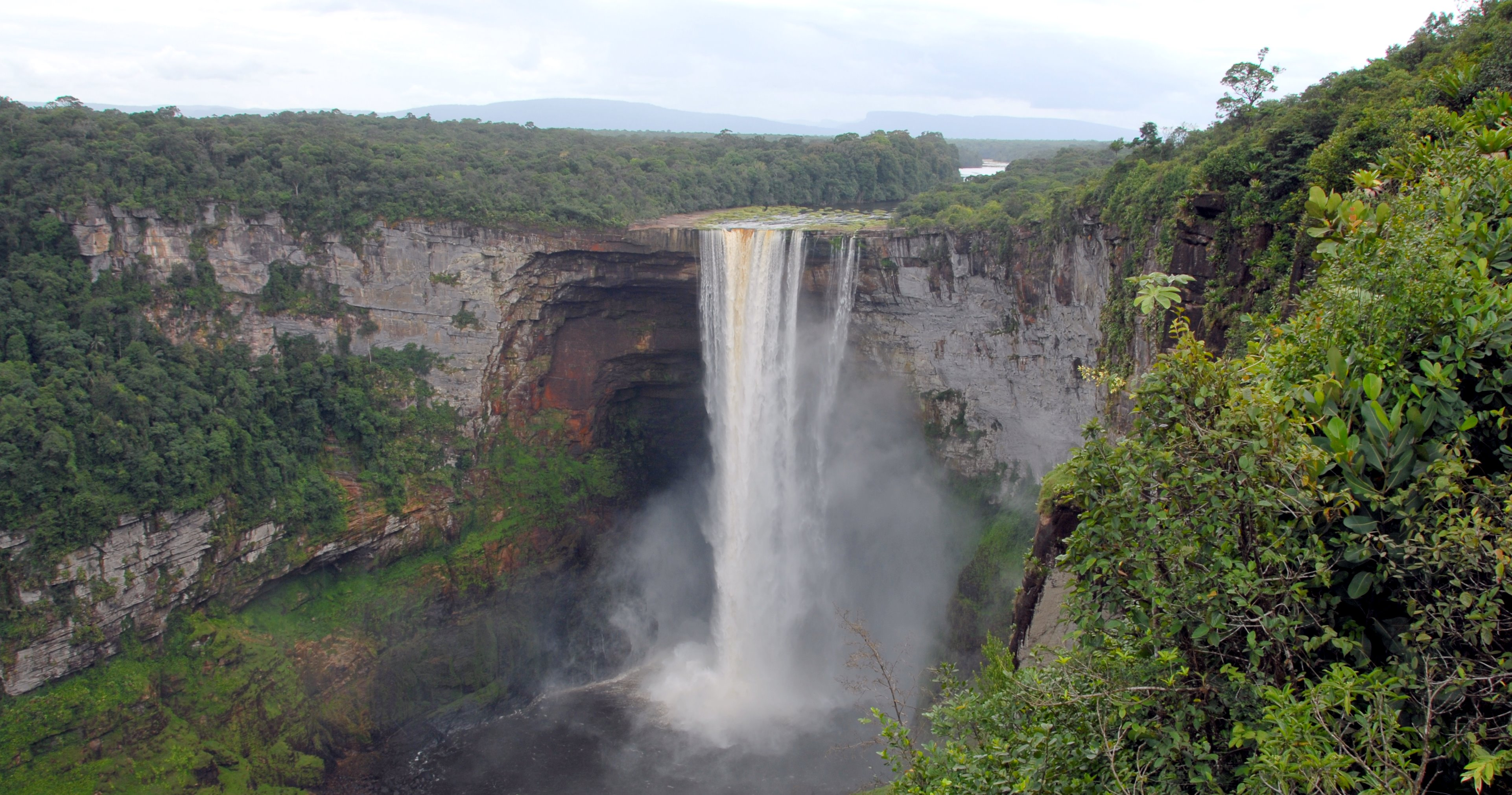
Kaietur Falls in the Dry Season, Feb 2007

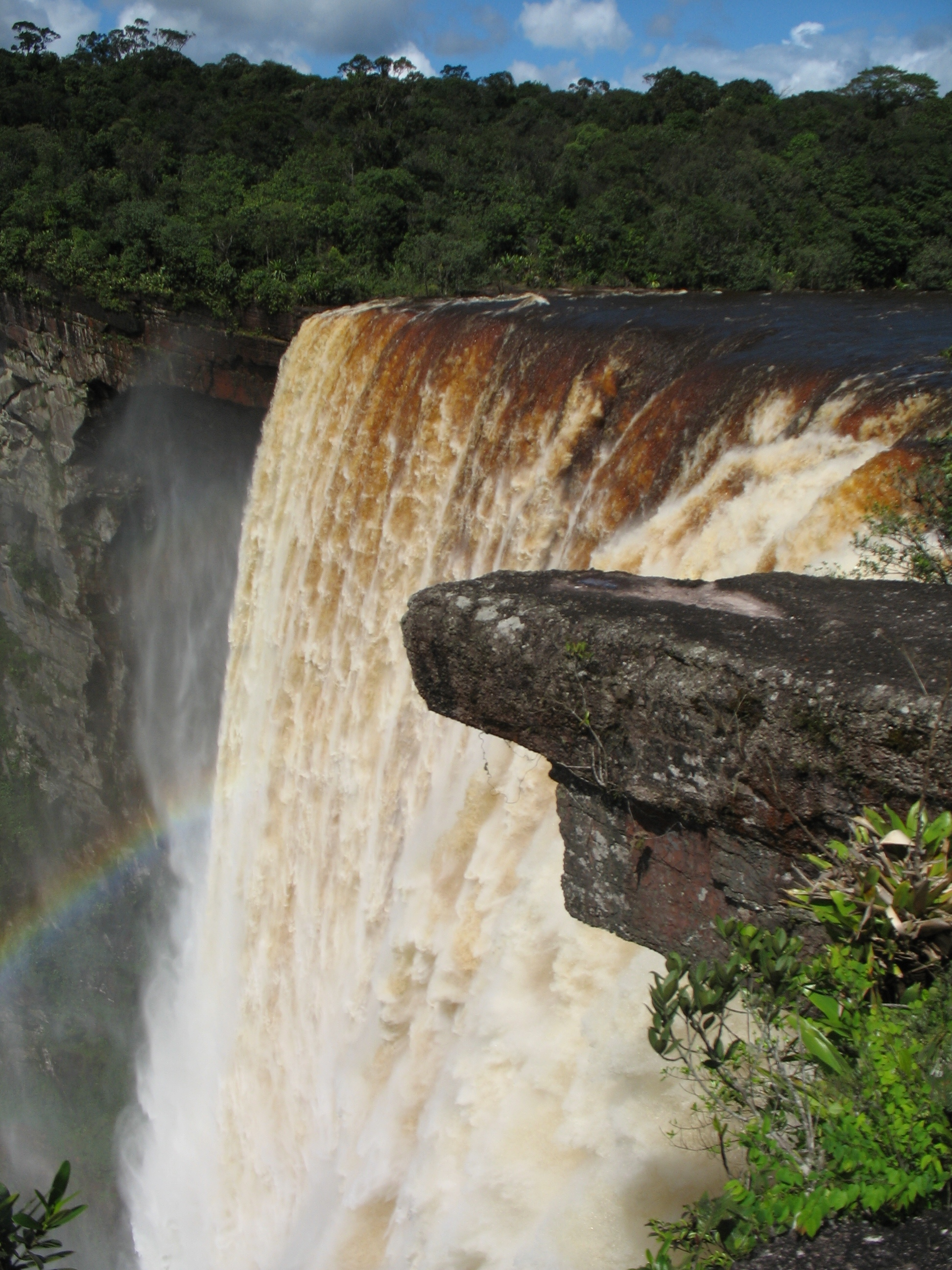
Kaieteur Falls, September 2007

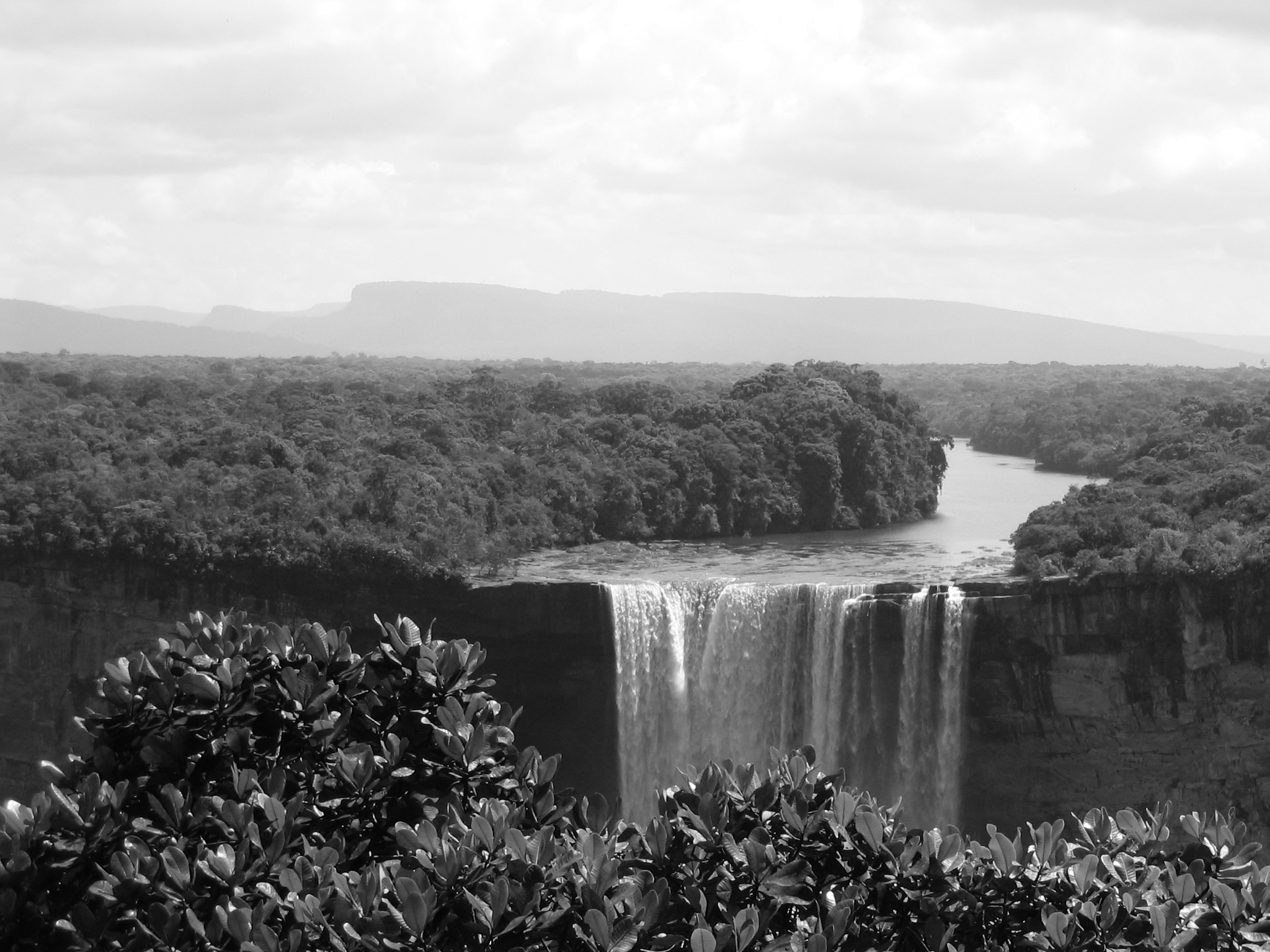
Kaieteur Falls 2006

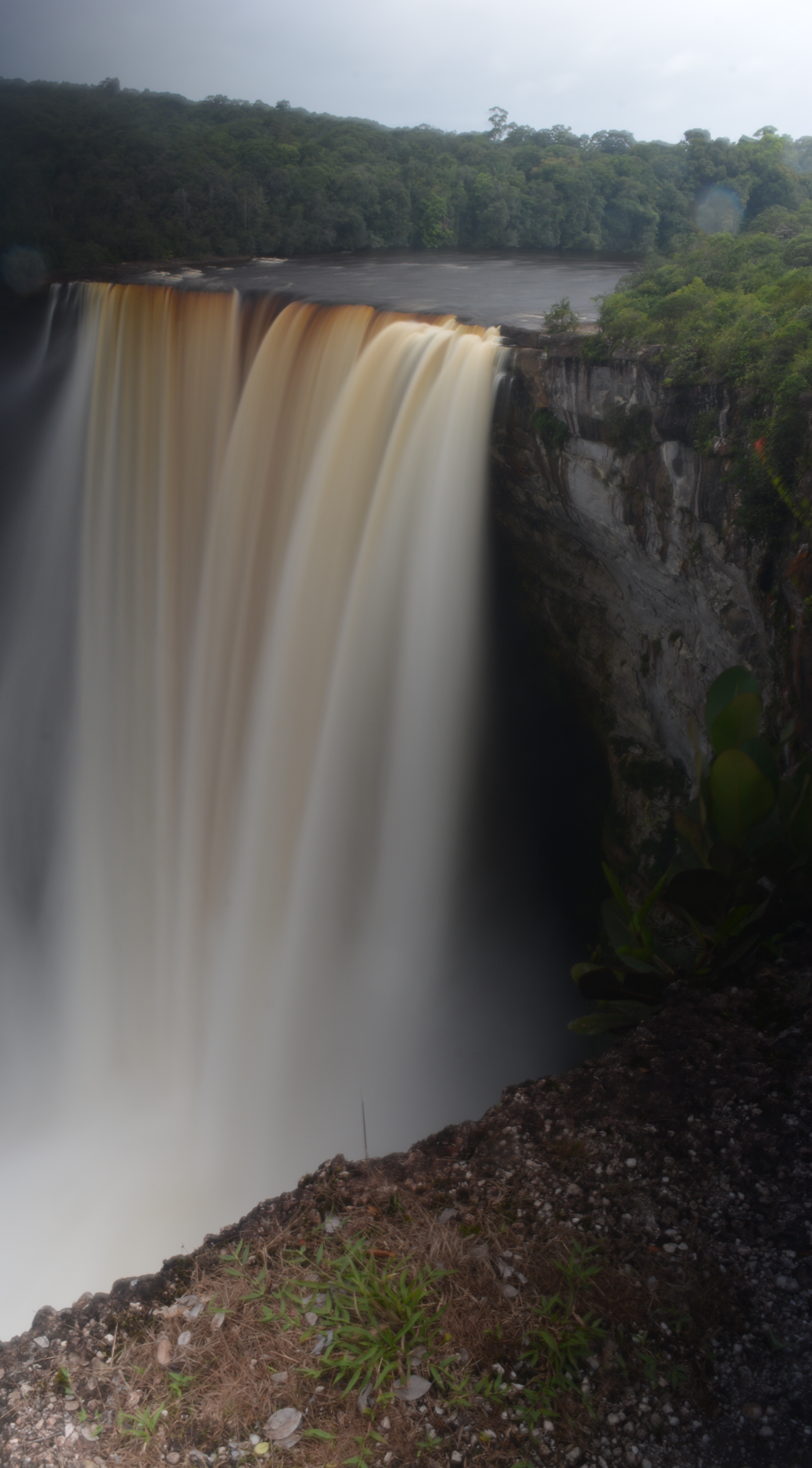
Kaieteur Falls December 2018

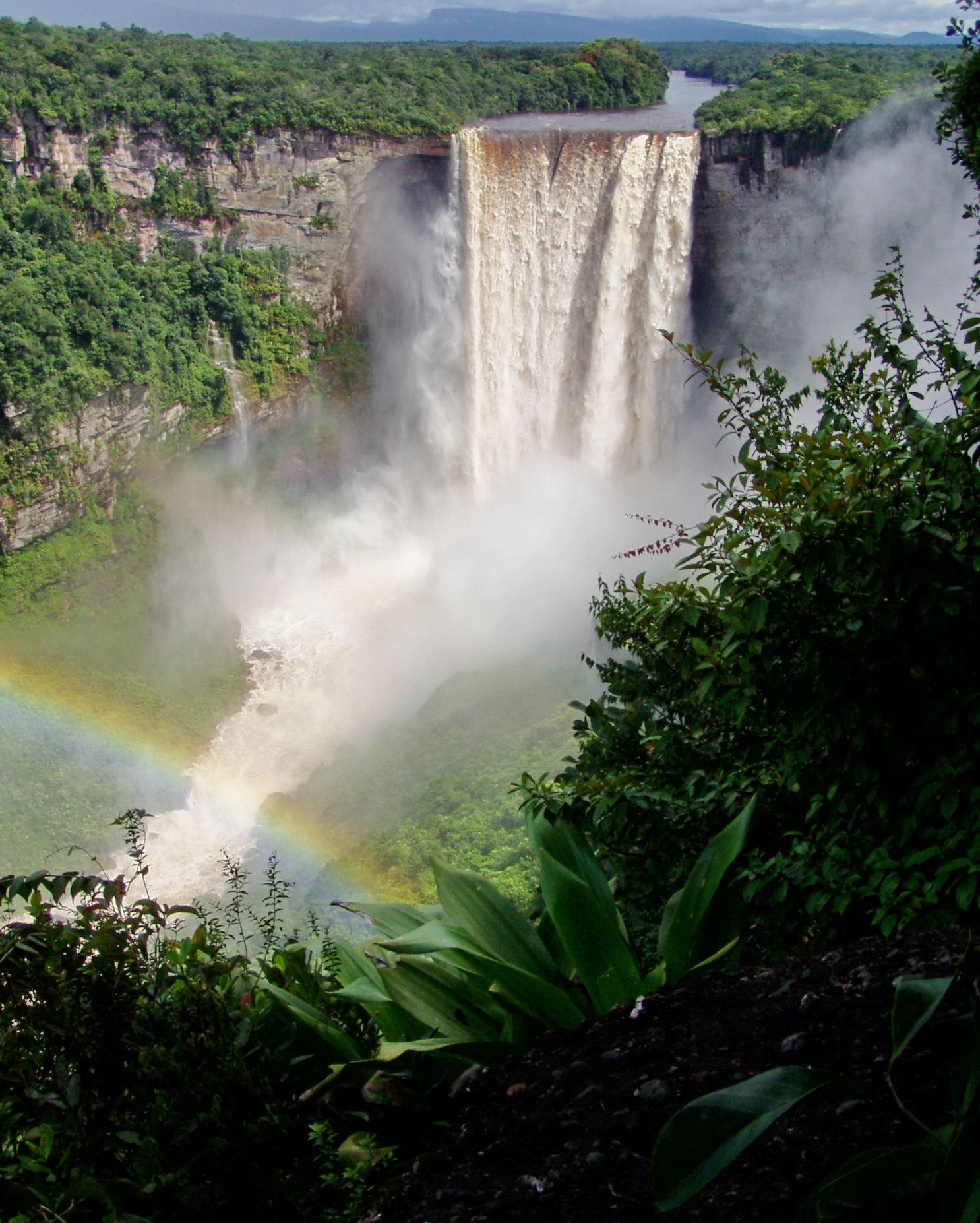
Kaieteur Falls, 2004

== See also ==
- List of waterfalls
- List of waterfalls by flow rate
