= Kaieteur National Park =

National park in Guyana

- IUCN category II (national park)
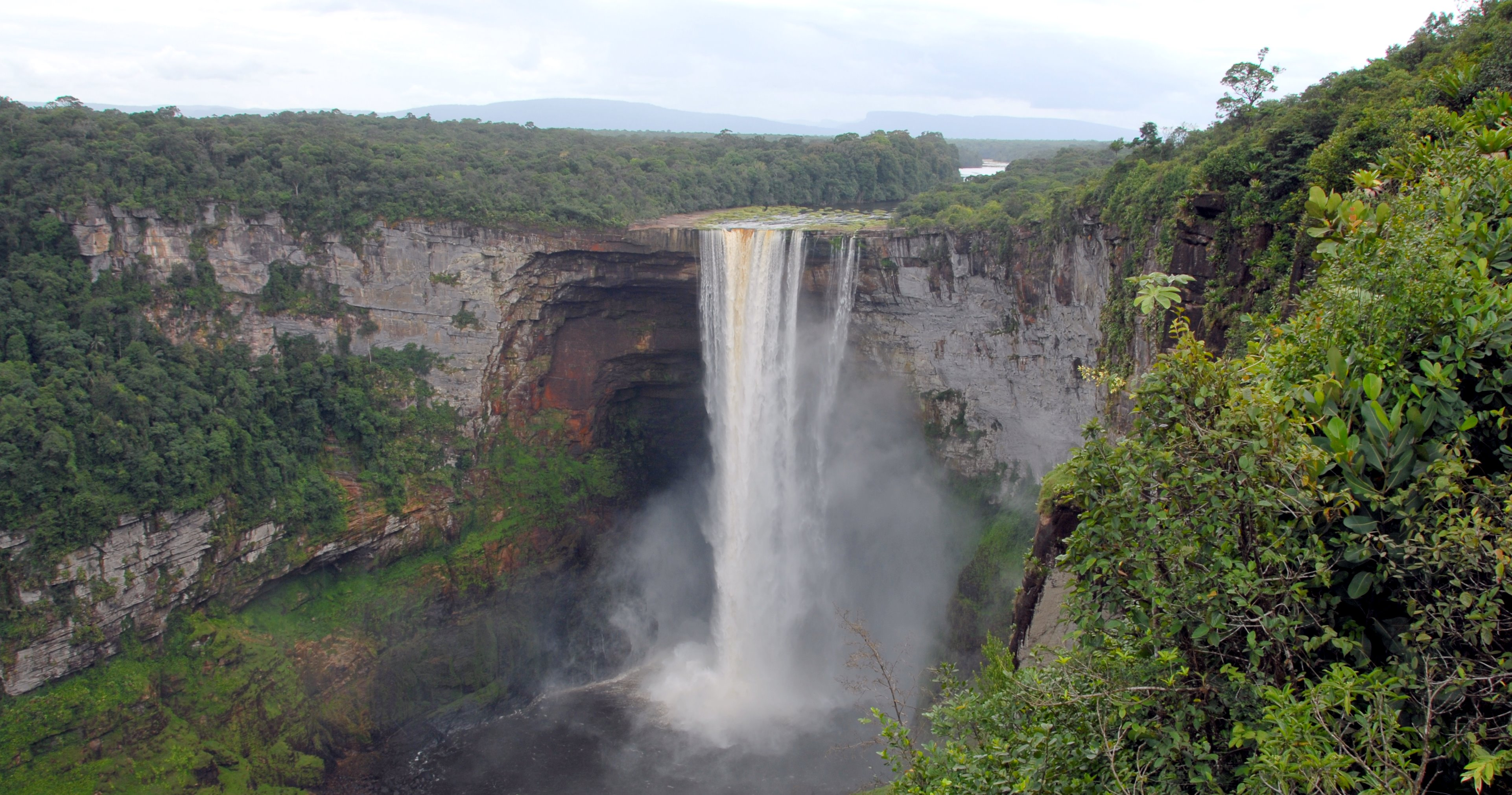
- Kaieteur Falls in the Kaieteur National Park
- Interactive map of Kaieteur National Park
- Location: Potaro-Siparuni Region of Guyana
- Coordinates: 5°13′N 59°25′W
- Area: 242 sq mi (630 km^{2})
- Established: 1929
- Governing body: Protected Areas Trust

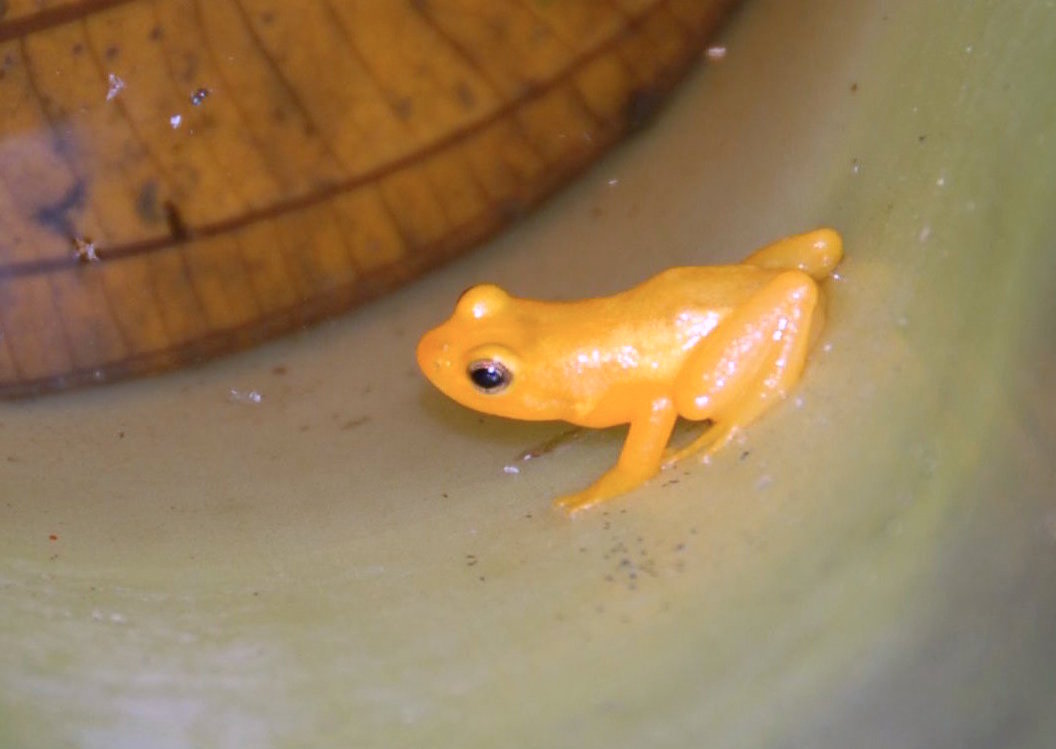
Golden rocket frog, Kaieteur National Park.

Kaieteur National Park is a national park located in the Potaro-Siparuni Region of Guyana, roughly 633 km (393.33 miles) south of Georgetown, the nation's capital, closer to the border with Brazil than to the Caribbean coast. It is widely considered the country's only national park, as the capital's National Park is a not a true wilderness reserve. Kaieteur is part of the Guianan moist forests ecoregion. The main tourist attraction in the park is Kaieteur Falls, considered the largest single-drop waterfall anywhere on earth, by volume of water.

The Kaieteur National Park Act was enacted by the government to protect the region's wealth of natural resources, its unique natural features (such as the aforementioned Kaieteur Falls), its biodiversity of Amazonian flora and fauna, and for the several Amerindian tribes whom have lived and thrived in this forest for millennia. The Act is administered by the Kaieteur National Park Commission. There are organisms unique to this region that cannot be found anywhere else on earth, such as the golden rocket frog (Anomaloglossus beebei), a diminutive frog that only breeds within the leaves of the bromeliad species Brocchinia micrantha (within the park), and nowhere else in the world.

The region is served by Kaieteur International Airport, which is situated at Kaieteur Falls.

== Boundaries ==
In 1999 the park's area was increased from 5 square miles (10 km^{2}) to 242 square miles (630 km^{2}) by a Presidential Order.

== Mining ==
In 2017, two dozen villagers from the Chenapau community were arrested for illegal mining within the Kaieteur National Park boundaries but were later released without any charges.

In November 2023, villagers were again accused of illegal mining within the park boundaries, which led to a protest by the villagers voicing their need to mine as a main source of income. The Chief Warden and the Guyana Geology and Mines Commission (GGMC) ordered the protesters to leave or face consequences. The villagers claimed to be mining in a buffer zone that was marked as land to be used for mining in accordance with the Amerindian Act.

Minister of Natural Resources Vickram Bharrat claimed that the GGMC will help the villagers find another area to mine that does not include boundaries within the National Park.
