= List of amphibians of Russia =

There are thirty species of amphibians recorded in Russia.

== List of species ==
=== Order Caudata ===
==== Family Hynobiidae ====
  - Genus Salamandrella
    - Siberian salamander (Salamandrella keyserlingii)
    - Schrenck Siberian salamander (Salamandrella schrenckii)
  - Genus Onychodactylus
    - Fischer's clawed salamander (Onychodactylus fischeri)

==== Family Salamandridae ====
  - Genus Lissotriton
    - Smooth newt (Lissotriton vulgaris)
  - Genus Ommatotriton
    - Southern banded newt (Ommatotriton vittatus)
  - Genus Triturus
    - Northern crested newt (Triturus cristatus)
    - Southern crested newt (Triturus karelinii)

=== Order Anura ===
==== Family Bombinatoridae ====
  - Genus Bombina
    - European fire-bellied toad (Bombina bombina)
    - Oriental fire-bellied toad (Bombina orientalis)

==== Family Pelobatidae ====
  - Genus Pelobates
    - Common spadefoot (Pelobates fuscus)
    - Eastern spadefoot (Pelobates syriacus)

==== Family Pelodytidae ====
  - Genus Pelodytes
    - Caucasian parsley frog (Pelodytes caucasicus)

==== Family Bufonidae ====
  - Genus Bufo
    - Common toad (Bufo bufo)
    - Caucasian toad (Bufo verrucosissimus)
    - Asiatic toad (Bufo gargarizans)
    - European green toad (Bufo viridis)
    - Natterjack toad (Bufo calamita)
    - Mongolian toad (Bufo raddei)

==== Family Hylidae ====
  - Genus Hyla
    - European tree frog (Hyla arborea)
    - Japanese tree frog (Hyla japonica)

==== Family Ranidae ====
  - Genus Rana
    - Common frog (Rana temporaria)
    - Moor frog (Rana arvalis)
    - Long-legged wood frog (Rana macrocnemis)
    - Siberian wood frog (Rana amurensis)
    - Dybowski's frog (Rana dybowskii)
    - Hokkaidō frog (Rana pirica)
  - Genus Pelophylax
    - Marsh frog (Pelophylax ridibundus)
    - Pool frog (Pelophylax lessonae)
    - Edible frog (Pelophylax kl. esculentus)
    - Dark-spotted frog (Pelophylax nigromaculatus)
