= Guizhou salamander =

Conservation status
- Data Deficient (IUCN 3.1)

Scientific classification
- Kingdom: Animalia
- Phylum: Chordata
- Class: Amphibia
- Order: Urodela
- Family: Hynobiidae
- Genus: Pseudohynobius
- Species: P. guizhouensis

Binomial name
- Pseudohynobius guizhouensis Li, Tian & Gu, 2010

Species of amphibian

The Guizhou salamander (Pseudohynobius guizhouensis) is a species of salamander in the family Hynobiidae. This recently described species is so far known only from its type locality, Yanxia Village (altitude 1,650 m) in Guiding County in Guizhou; it is endemic to China. Adult salamanders measure 157–203 mm (6.2–8.0 in) in total length.

The original species description relied on morphological characteristics only. Genetic methods, however, have confirmed the Guizhou salamander is a valid species. According to the original description, it is most similar to the Kuankuoshui salamander and the yellow-spotted salamander (P. kuankuoshuiensis and P. flavomaculatus, respectively); genetic data suggest the Jinfo Mountain salamander (P. jinfo) to be its close relative too.
