= Yunnan firebelly toad =

Yunnan firebelly toad may refer to two different species of toads:

- Bombina maxima, found in Yunnan, China, and likely Myanmar
- Bombina microdeladigitora, found in south-western China to north-western Vietnam, eastern Myanmar, and likely Laos
