= Taibai =

Taibai may refer to:

- Taibai County (太白县), of Baoji, Shaanxi
- Li Bai (701-762), style name Taibai, Chinese poet
- Mount Taibai, mountain peak in Shaanxi Province.

Towns (太白镇)

- Taibai, Dangtu County, in Dangtu County, Anhui
- Taibai, Suiyang County, in Suiyang County, Guizhou
- Taibai, Wuyuan County, Jiangxi, in Wuyuan County, Jiangxi

== See also ==
- Taebaek, in Gangwon Province, South Korea
