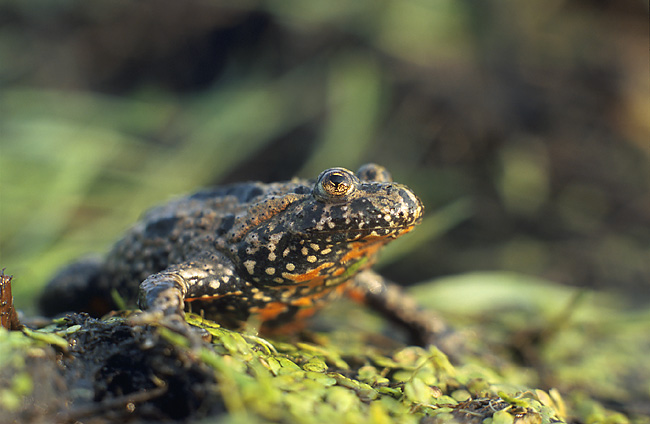

Conservation status
- Least Concern (IUCN 3.1)

Scientific classification
- Kingdom: Animalia
- Phylum: Chordata
- Class: Amphibia
- Order: Anura
- Family: Bombinatoridae
- Genus: Bombina
- Species: B. bombina

Binomial name
- Bombina bombina (Linnaeus, 1758)
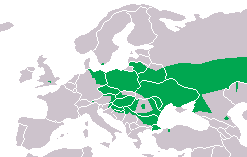

Synonyms
- List: Rana bombina (Linnaeus, 1758); Buffo ignicolor (Lacépède, 1788); Bufo bombinus (Latreille in Sonnini de Manoncourt and Latreille, 1801); Rana ignea (Shaw, 1802); Bufo pluvialis (Daudin, 1802); Rana cruenta (Pallas, 1814); Bombinator igneus (Merrem, 1820); Bombina ignea (Sturm, 1828); Bufo (Bombinator) bombina (Cuvier, 1829); Bombitator bombinus (Wagler, 1830); Bufo cruentus (Dvigubsky, 1832); Bufo bombinus (Schinz, 1833); Bufo bombina (Schinz, 1837); Bombinator igneus (Boulenger, 1882); Bombinator bombina (Bedriaga, 1890); Bombinator variegatus bombina (Prazák, 1898); Bombina bombina (Stejneger, 1907); Bombina (Bombina) bombina (Tian and Hu, 1985)

= European fire-bellied toad =

Species of amphibian

The European fire-bellied toad (Bombina bombina) is a species of fire-bellied toad native to eastern parts of mainland Europe, where it can be found near waterbodies such as ponds and marshes. It is known for its red colored belly used to ward off predators, an example of aposematism, and its distinctive "whoop" call.

== Description ==
The European fire-bellied toad is a medium-sized frog, growing up to approximately 5.6 centimetres (2 3/16 in). The dorsal coloration can vary from gray to brown to green, while the stomach is red with thick black mottling. The backs of these frogs are covered in warts.

When threatened by a predator, the fire-bellied toad will lift up its arms (sometimes flipping over) to expose its red coloration and show off its toxicity to the potential predator. This is known as Unkenreflex, and is an example of aposematism.

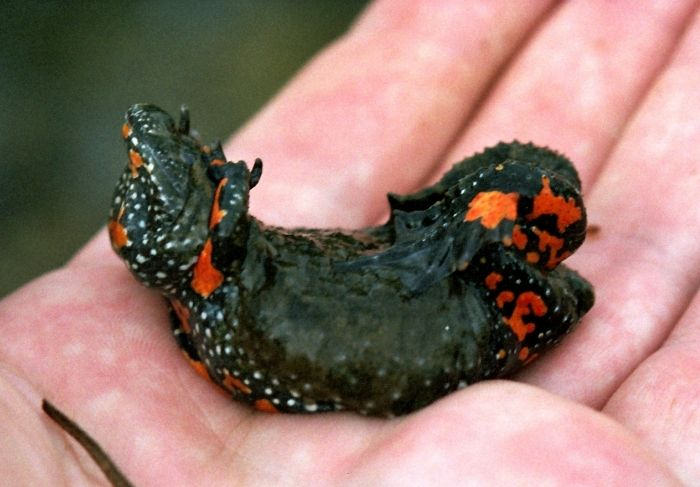
European fire-bellied toad lifting its arms and legs as a defense mechanism, called the unkenreflex

== Distribution ==
The European fire-bellied toad is found throughout Central and Eastern Europe. More particularly, its range starts in eastern Germany (including eastern Denmark and parts of southern Sweden), and then east to the Volga District of Russia where they are stopped by the Ural Mountains. The frog's most southern range is Bulgaria and the Marmara region of Turkey.

There is an introduced population of European fire-bellied toads in Lorraine, France, over 500 kilometres (310 mi) away from their natural range in eastern Germany. This population was first discovered in 2009 in Moselle but has since been found in several other nearby locations up to 30 kilometres (19 mi) away, which suggests they were moved by humans intentionally. They can potentially impact the local yellow-bellied toads through hybridization.

While they are listed as "Least Concern" by the IUCN, this frog has been suffering some losses throughout its range. For example, 15 known breeding populations of these frogs were identified in Denmark in 1974, but by 1988 only 8 of those populations remained. In the Puszcza Romincka Landscape Park in Poland, the fire-bellied toad was described as uncommon, rare in the Coastal Landscape Park, and in an amphibian survey in Warsaw the fire-bellied toad only made up 9% of the observed species. However, in some areas they are recovering through human intervention, such as in Funen County, Denmark, where dozens of ponds were dug for the frogs to live and breed in, increasing their population approximately five-fold in a decade.

== Ecology ==
This frog generally prefers to live in lowland areas such as ponds and marshes without too much woody vegetation. In larger lakes these frogs will stay on the edges (50 to 70 centimetres (20 to 28 in) deep) in reed beds and floodplains. They feed on all sorts of small invertebrates, in particular springtails, beetles, flies, and ants. In return, the frogs are preyed on by many other animals such as snakes and birds, while tadpoles are eaten by leeches and fish.

They will typically hibernate once temperatures dip down to 4 °C (39 °F), during which they burrow into soil or a rotting log and remain in a state of torpor until spring. Breeding commences once temperatures reach 16 °C (61 °F) and is usually done at night time or early morning, where females will deposit up to 15 to 40 eggs depending on their size. Tadpoles are born in about a week and develop for approximately a month before metamorphosing at a size of about 3.8 centimetres (1 1/2 in)).

== Evolution ==
The European fire-bellied toad (B. bombina) and yellow-bellied toad (B. variegata) are the product of clinal speciation. They emerged from an ancient divergence event, however they continue to hybridise where they overlap geographically. Yanchukov et al. 2006's survey of these species aids understanding of clinal speciation itself: Because different subpopulations carry different combinations of the reproductive isolation mechanisms, and because they combine data from a new transect with four preceding transects, their comparison and reanalysis of this speciation process helps to understand the contribution of single-nucleotide polymorphisms to clinal speciation. Clinal speciation is a challenging dynamic to study and so Yanchukov is one of the few to provide insight into this relationship.

Their speciation occurred during the Pleistocene epoch. The ancestor to both species was confined to southern Europe during the Last Glacial Maximum, where B. variegata evolved in the mountains in the west (Apennine and Balkans) and B. bombina in the lowlands to the east (the steppes around the Black and Caspian Sea). As the glaciers receded, both species spread out to the rest of Europe but hybridized and competed with each other until B. bombina occupied the lowlands and B. variegata the higher altitudes.

While the two frogs hybridize in narrow hybrid zones of approximately 2 to 7 kilometres (1.2 to 4.3 mi) wide, they generally avoid it by differing in their morphology and behavior. B. bombina prefers to breed in lowland seasonal ponds, such as wet meadows and floodplains, but ones that are still close to nearby permanent waterbodies. On the other hand, B. variegata prefers to breed in higher elevations in ephemeral ponds that are quick to dry up. B. bombina also spends more time confined to a waterbody compared to B. variegata, which is more terrestrial and has evolved longer legs and thicker skin to aid in their frequent migrations onto dry land. Additionally, B. variegata is unable to sing as loudly as B. bombina due to their lack of internal vocal sacs, which forces them to find other breeding ponds without the other species of fire-bellied toad.

== Secondary metabolites ==
Like its relatives – including B. variegata and B. orientalis – B. bombina produces bombinins. The H. Michl group in Vienna were the first to study B. bombina and B. variegata, first publishing a partial bombinin amino acid sequence in Kiss & Michl 1962. A few years later they discovered it was merely the carboxy terminal of a larger molecule in Csordás & Michl 1970, also showing antibacterial effect. The antifungal effect of bombinins in the toads' skin makes them promising factors for incorporation into food packaging to retard spoilage. More recently Jilek et al. 2005 searched for homologues of the isomerase and found the closest in Xenopus tropicalis, but also finding predicted homologues in various other vertebrates including the chicken (Gallus domesticus).

The prokineticin family of compounds was first discovered in this species and B. variegata. These two species produce Bv8 and subsequently other prokineticins have been isolated from other species in the genus, and predicted in Rana temporaria and Pelophylax esculentus.
