= Eobarbourula =

Eobarbourula Temporal range: Ypresian

Scientific classification
- Kingdom: Animalia
- Phylum: Chordata
- Class: Amphibia
- Order: Anura
- Family: Bombinatoridae
- Genus: †Eobarbourula; Folie et al., 2012
- Species: †E. delfinoi

Binomial name
- †Eobarbourula delfinoi Folie et al., 2012

Extinct genus of amphibians

Eobarbourula delfinoi is an extinct toad which existed in what is now Gujarat, India, during the Middle Ypresian age of the early Eocene. It was described by Annelise Folie, Rajendra S. Rana, Kenneth D. Rose, Ashok Sahni, Kishor Kumar, Lachham Singh and Thierry Smith in 2012, and is the only species in the genus Eobarbourula. The name of the genus is a combination of "Eo", referring to the epoch in which the animal existed, and Barbourula, the generic name of the jungle toads, while the specific epithet refers to Massimo Delfino, an Italian paleontologist.
