= Suiyang =

Suiyang may refer to the following locations in China:

- Suiyang District (睢阳区), Shangqiu, Henan
- Suiyang County (绥阳县), of Zunyi, Guizhou
- Suiyang, Fenggang County (绥阳镇), town in Guizhou
- Suiyang, Dongning County (绥阳镇), town in Heilongjiang
- Suiyang (睢阳), historical name of Shangqiu, Henan
