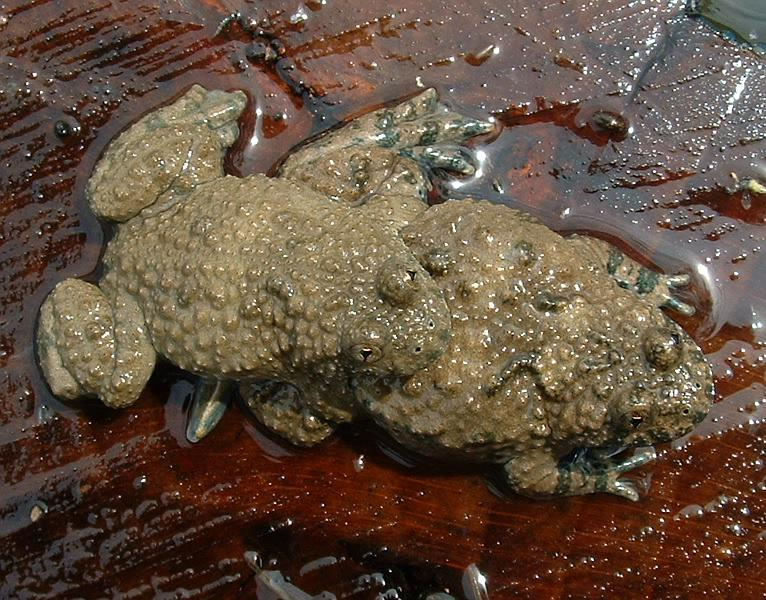
- Bombina variegata

Scientific classification
- Kingdom: Animalia
- Phylum: Chordata
- Class: Amphibia
- Order: Anura
- Suborder: Archaeobatrachia
- Family: Bombinatoridae; Gray, 1825

Genera
- See text
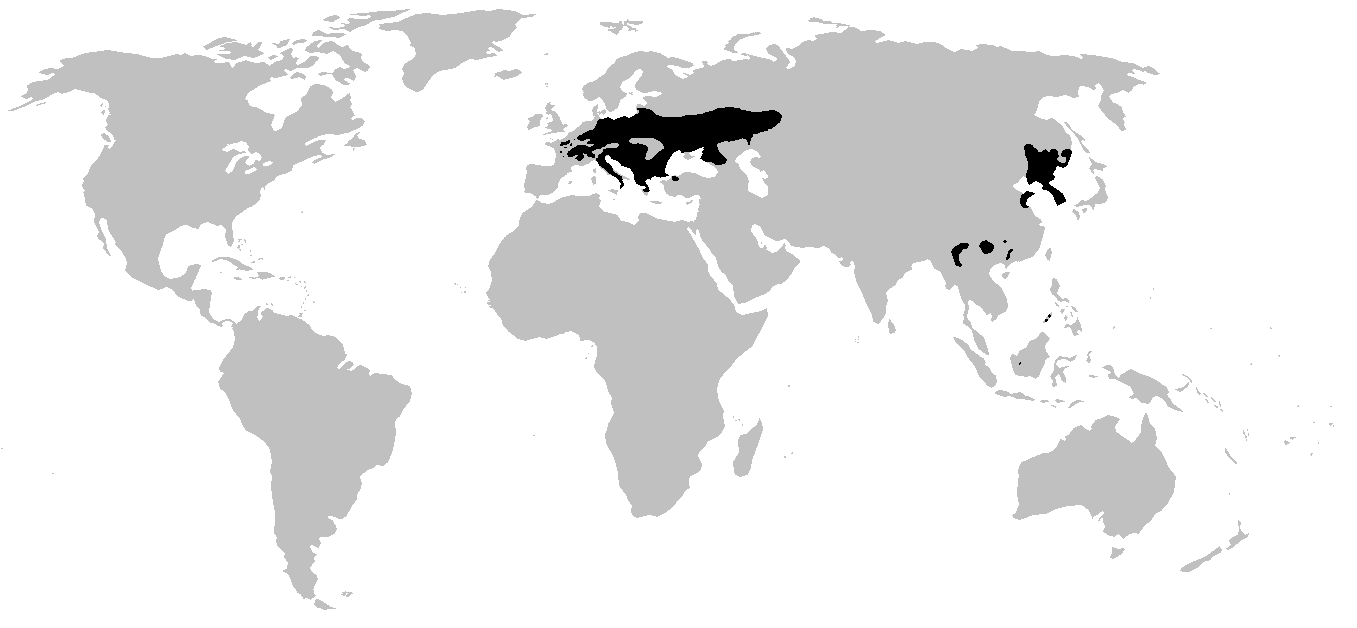
- Distribution of Bombinatoridae (in black)

= Bombinatoridae =

Bombinatoridae Temporal range: Maastrichtian–Recent

Family of amphibians

Bombinatoridae is a family of toads found in Eurasia. Species of the family have flattened bodies and some are highly toxic.

== Taxonomy and systematics ==
Fossil specimens of the genus Bombina are known from the Pliocene to the Pleistocene. The earliest fossil specimens are Eobarbourula from the Eocene of India, and Hatzegobatrachus from Late Cretaceous of Hateg island, Romania. The genus Barbourula was considered to be situated intermediate between Discoglossus and Bombina, but closer to the latter, so was added to the Bombinatoridae when that family was split from the Discoglossidae.

=== Genera ===
Currently, there are two extant and at least two extinct genera recognised in the family Bombinatoridae:

Image	Genus	Species
	Barbourula (Taylor and Noble, 1924) - jungle toads	Philippine flat-headed frog (B. busuangensis) or Busuanga jungle toad; Bornean flat-headed frog (B. kalimantanensis) or Kalimantan jungle toad
	Bombina (Oken, 1816) - firebelly toads	Bombina bombina (Linnaeus, 1761) – European fire-bellied toad; Bombina microdeladigitora (Liu, Hu & Yang, 1960) – Hubei firebelly toad, and other names; Bombina maxima (Boulenger, 1905) – Yunnan firebelly toad; Bombina orientalis (Boulenger, 1890) – Oriental fire-bellied toad; Bombina pachypus (Bonaparte, 1838) – Apennine yellow-bellied toad; Bombina variegata (Linnaeus, 1758) – yellow-bellied toad

=== Extinct Genera ===
- †Eobarbourula (Folie et al., 2012)
- †Hatzegobatrachus (Venczel & Csiki, 2003)

== Description ==
Bombina species are warty, aquatic toads about 7 cm (2.8 in) in length, and most noted for their bright bellies. They often display the unken reflex when disturbed; the animal will arch its back and limbs to expose the bright belly, and may turn over on its back. This acts as a warning to predators. The vocal behavior of some Bombina species are unusual in that the call is produced during inhalation rather than exhalation as in other frogs. They lay pigmented eggs in ponds.

== Distribution and habitat ==
Species of the genus Barbourula occur in the Philippine Islands and Borneo, while species of the genus Bombina are found throughout Eurasia. They are slightly less colored than Bombina spp., and possess webbed fingers in addition to webbed toes. Characteristics of tadpoles of Barbourula spp. are unknown.
