= Kuankuoshui salamander =

Conservation status
- Critically Endangered (IUCN 3.1)

Scientific classification
- Kingdom: Animalia
- Phylum: Chordata
- Class: Amphibia
- Order: Urodela
- Family: Hynobiidae
- Genus: Pseudohynobius
- Species: P. kuankuoshuiensis

Binomial name
- Pseudohynobius kuankuoshuiensis Xu, Zeng, & Fu, 2007

Species of amphibian

The Kuankuoshui salamander (Pseudohynobius kuankuoshuiensis) is a species of salamander in the family Hynobiidae endemic to China and only know from its type locality, Puchang-Kuankuoshui Nature Reserve (蒲昌宽阔水) in Suiyang County, Guizhou Province. Its natural habitats are temperate forests, streams, and pools. It is threatened by habitat loss. The Kuankuoshui salamander is a relative large salamander, about 20 cm (7.9 in) in total length.
