= Paradactylodon mustersi =

Conservation status
- Endangered (IUCN 3.1)

Scientific classification
- Kingdom: Animalia
- Phylum: Chordata
- Class: Amphibia
- Order: Urodela
- Family: Hynobiidae
- Subfamily: Hynobiinae
- Genus: Paradactylodon
- Species: P. mustersi

Binomial name
- Paradactylodon mustersi (Smith, 1940)

Synonyms
- (Species): Batrachuperus mustersi Smith, 1940; Afghanodon mustersi Dubois and Raffaëlli, 2012

Genus of amphibians

Paradactylodon mustersi is a species of salamander endemic to Afghanistan. It is also known as the Afghanistan brook salamander, Paghman Mountain Salamander, Afghan brook salamander, Afghanistan mountain salamander, Paghman mountain salamander, and Paghman stream salamander. It inhabits cool highland streams. The total population is estimated at 1,000–2,000 adults. It is only found in an area of 10 km^{2}.

P. mustersi is known to reside in the Paghman Mountains in Afghanistan, where it lives in fast-running waters (the adults and the eggs or larvae in calmer, deeper water) which are formed from melting glaciers. Currently, it can only be found in cold water: it has only been found in water ranging from 0 to 14 °C.

The males are larger than the females, with the largest about 18 cm in length. They are not very similar to other salamander species in many respects. They may look similar to salamander species, but unlike many others, the Paghman stream salamander can feed in water, they are found under rocks in the fast running water, and even catch prey on land. They have long tongues which they use to catch prey, and the adults prefer to catch prey larger than their own size.

The current population is unknown at this time, but older estimates numbered the salamanders from 1000 to 2000; quite possibly the numbers have gone down since the time of this count. They are expected to be found in the southern slopes of the Hindu Kush near Afghanistan. The population is declining due to the invasion of humans on their land. Irrigation systems disturb the salamanders' habitat. The more the land is being used by humans, the worse it gets for the Paghman stream salamander. To remain a part of Afghanistan's ecosystem, its habitat needs to be conserved.
