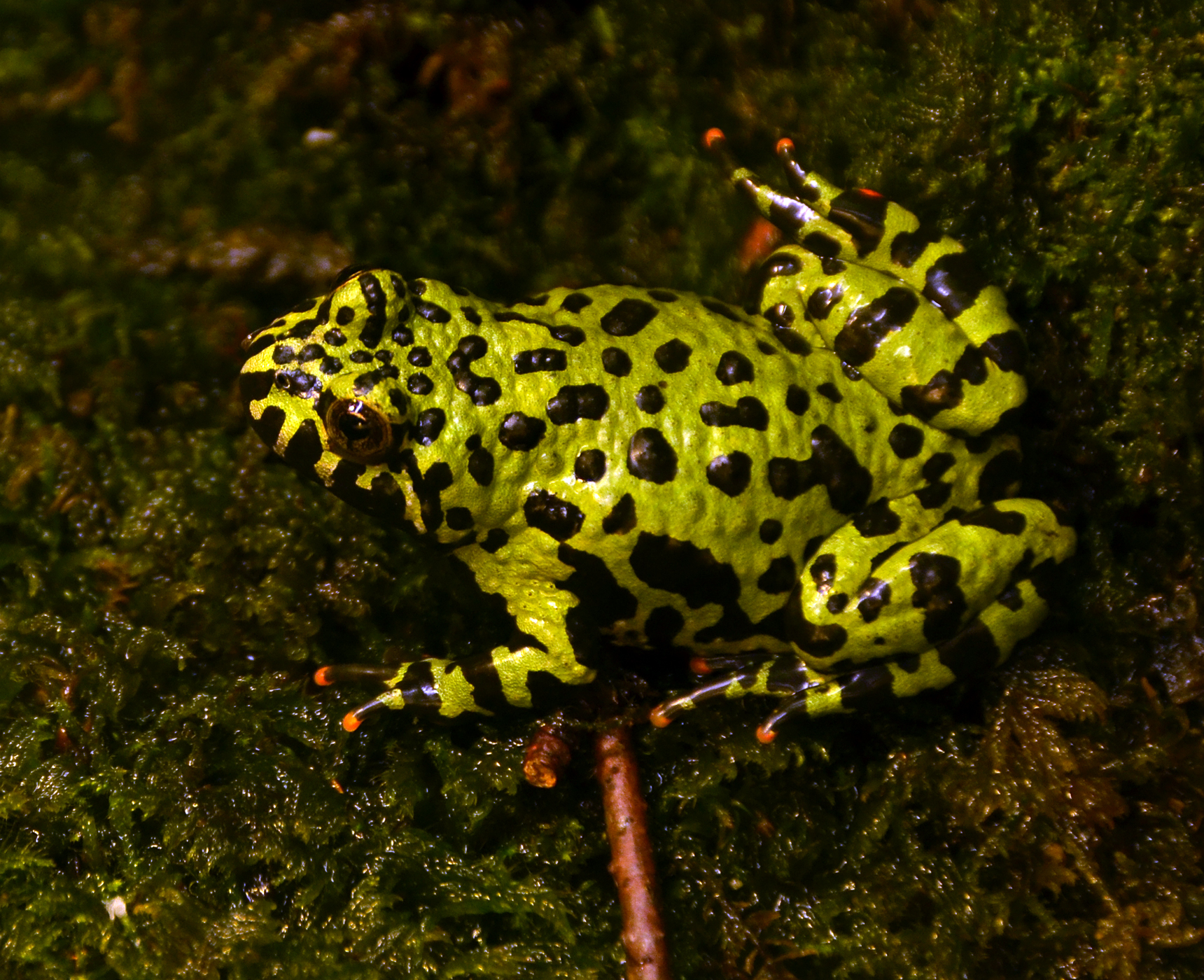

Conservation status
- Least Concern (IUCN 3.1)

Scientific classification
- Kingdom: Animalia
- Phylum: Chordata
- Class: Amphibia
- Order: Anura
- Family: Bombinatoridae
- Genus: Bombina
- Species: B. orientalis

Binomial name
- Bombina orientalis (Boulenger, 1890)

Synonyms
- Bombinator orientalis (Boulenger, 1890); Bombina orientalis practicola (Korotkov, 1972); Bombina orientalis silvatica (Korotkov, 1972)

= Oriental fire-bellied toad =

Species of amphibian

The Oriental fire-bellied toad (Bombina orientalis) is a small semiaquatic frog species found in northeastern Asia, where they primarily dwell in slow-moving bodies of water and temperate forests. Quite common throughout much of their range, these frogs have mild toxins that can be excreted through their skin, with their vibrant underbellies serving as a warning of this. While not a true toad, their green and black skin is covered in small tubercles, giving them a toadlike appearance. Their sounds, mainly produced by males during the mating season, are very unlike those of other frogs. While their population is in decline, their numbers are still high overall, with the International Union for Conservation of Nature (IUCN) rating them as a least-concern species. They are commonly kept as pets in land and water vivaria, as a relatively easy-to-care for species. They are also frequently used in scientific research, with their behavior, vocalizations, and learning skills all moderately studied.

== Etymology ==
According to the American Museum of Natural History, the red-bellied toad, Chinese bell toad, Oriental bell toad, eastern fire-bellied toad, and Korean fire-bellied toad are all common names that have been used to describe the species at one point or another.

== Taxonomy ==
The Oriental fire-bellied toad was first described by George Albert Boulenger as Bombinator orientalis, who placed it within the same genus as the European fire-bellied toad and the Apennine yellow-bellied toad, noting their many similarities. He considered it an "intermediate" between the latter two species, although he thought it was closer to the Apennine yellow-bellied toad overall. His research was based on 19 specimens housed in the British Museum. The three species were moved into the genus Bombina in 1907 by Leonhard Stejneger.

The toad was later divided into two subspecies in 1972, B. o. practicola and B. o. silvatica, with the former being more aquatic and the latter more terrestrial, although newer research has found them to display few genetic differences, despite some physical ones. These findings support their classification as a monotypic species, albeit one with multiple morphs that may have diverged rather recently. A population in Beijing, despite having existed for less than a hundred years, has shown signs of evolution at a molecular level, displaying genetic uniqueness from the original population. While genetic diversity is somewhat low, it is still high enough that the Beijing toads may continue to survive.

In the late Quaternary, seismic activity at the Yilan–Yitong fault zone is believed to have split the toad into two subpopulations in its native range, with the much smaller western one having low genetic diversity. In more recent times, gene flow has begun to occur between the two.

== Description ==
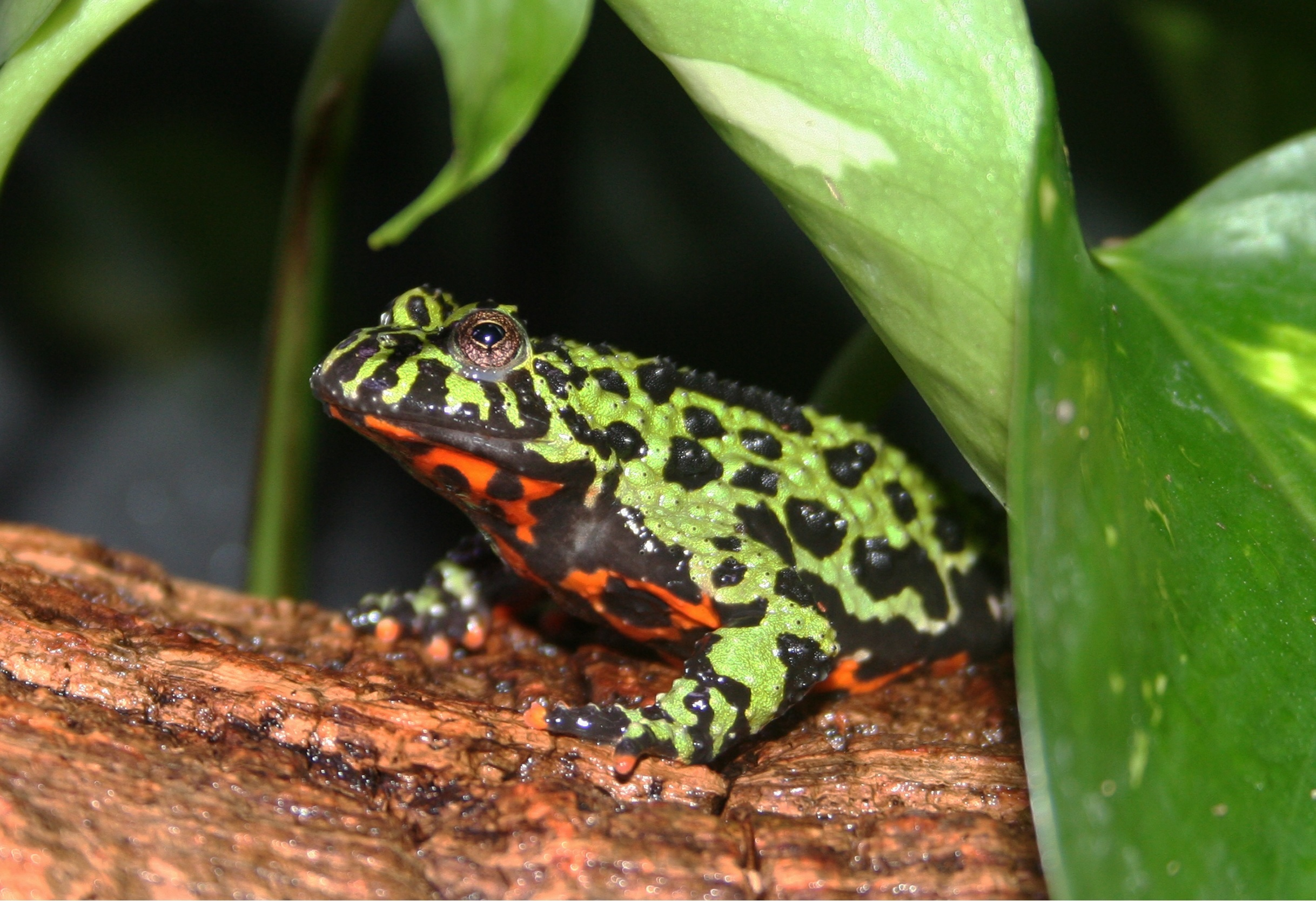
A fire-bellied toad showing off the characteristic green and black back with orange toes

Oriental fire-bellied toads can be bright, grayish, or brownish green, with black mottling on their dorsal regions. Like other Bombina species, B. orientalis has a brightly colored ventral region, which can be yellow, red, or orange-red, mottled with dark spots. The finger and toe tips are usually red. The skin on its upper side is covered in small tubercles, the most pronounced of the genus Bombina. Although it is typically referred to as a toad, the fire-bellied toad is not a true toad. They can reach a length of about 3.8–5.1 centimetres (1.5–2.0 in), weighing about 28–57 grams (0.99–2.01 oz). Males and females can be told apart by the males' nuptial pads on their first and second fingers.

Besides having more noticeable tubercles on their skin, B. orientalis can also be distinguished from other members of Bombina by their lack of gular sacs (like B. pachypus and unlike B. bombina) and nuptial pads (like B. bombina and unlike B. pachypus, although later research has shown that males do in fact have a few, as previously mentioned). Subtler differences include their belly coloration, which is typically more red than yellow (unlike B. pachypus) and bright finger tips (unlike B. bombina).

== Distribution and habitat ==
The toad can be found in Korea, northeastern Russia, (where they have become rather rare) and northeastern China, and possibly southern Japan, specifically Tsushima Strait, although the latter is very likely erroneous, as a team of Japanese researchers in the later half of the 20th century was unable to locate any. There is also a somewhat genetically distinct population in Beijing that was introduced from Yantai in Shandong in 1927 by Mr. Liu Cheng-chao. About 200 were released into wetland habitats, where they later bred. There have been multiple reports of escaped specimens in Broward County, Florida, US, mostly in the immediate vicinity of an animal importer's facility. There have been no other reports of such occurrences in the United States, and there are no well-established escaped populations.

They are semiaquatic, generally dwelling in slow-moving streams or ponds. When out of the water, they can often be found in coniferous and broadleaved forests. They can be found at elevations of up to 1,100 metres (3,600 ft). They are very resilient to environmental disturbance, especially compared to other amphibians, and as such can be found living and even breeding in heavily polluted water.

== Behavior and ecology ==
Bombina orientalis are one of the most plentiful amphibians in their native lands, particularly the central part of their range. The toads are diurnal (active during the day), and studies have found that while they can acquire some from their diet, Oriental fire-bellied toads rely partly on sunlight to obtain adequate levels of vitamin D_{3}.

=== Diet ===
As larvae, Oriental fire-bellied toads consume algae, fungi, detritus, plants and protozoans. As adults, their diet consists of terrestrial invertebrates, including worms, molluscs and insects. Their diet in the wild contributes to their toxicity, and for that reason, wild specimens have more potent toxins. Oriental fire-bellied toads are incapable of extending their tongues to catch prey, but must instead leap at their target.

=== Breeding ===
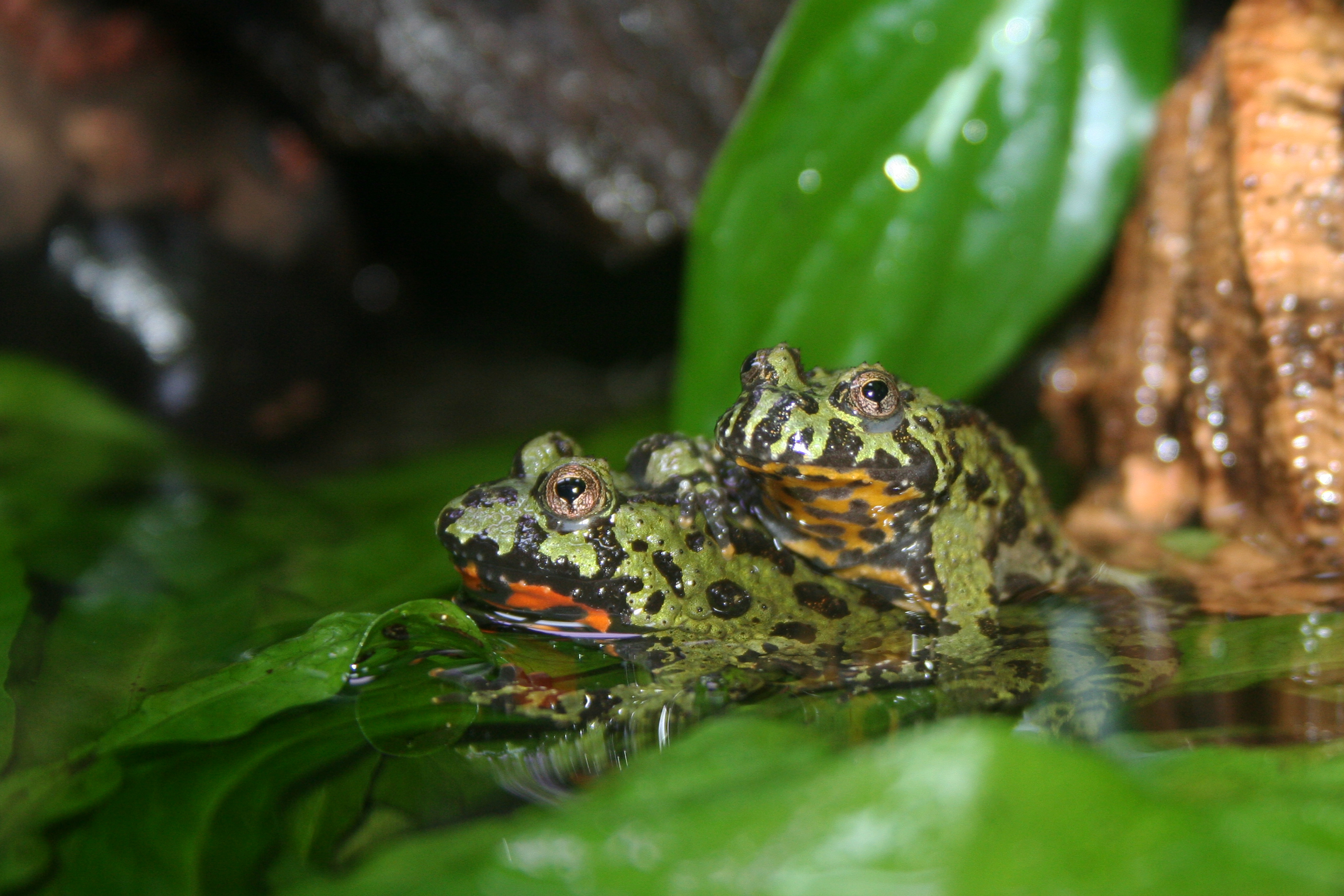
A mating pair of Oriental fire-bellied toads

Breeding takes place around mid-May, when temperatures become warmer. It is at this time that the toads emerge from hibernation. Males call to the females with a light sound that is comparable to a musical triangle. They will jump onto the backs of any other fire-bellied toad that happens to pass by, which in some cases will cause them to accidentally attempt to mate with other species of amphibians, fish, plants, or even human fingers. Females lay 40 to 110 eggs in a large cluster near the surface of the water. The tadpoles begin to develop legs in 6–8 weeks, and are fully metamorphosed by August or September.

=== Vocalizations ===
Unusually for a frog species, the Oriental fire-bellied toad does not have an eardrum or resonator, making their calls by inhaling. The males' light mating calls are similar to those of B. bombina. While vocalizing, males will attempt to space out their calls so as to avoid overlap between different individuals, a behavior also observed in European fire-bellied toads. Females have been found to be quickly attracted to the advertisement call, but not the release call, displaying an ability to differentiate between them. Males typically ignore the advertisement calls, but will approach the source of release calls. In both cases, visual stimuli are also necessary to trigger a reaction. In addition to their lighter sounds, they can also produce a croaking noise.

=== Predation ===
Oriental fire-bellied toads can discourage most predators with their poisonous skin, with the bright colors of their undersides warning predators of their toxicity. The toxin is secreted through the skin mostly from the hind legs, and sometimes the belly, in a milky substance when the frog is disturbed or frightened. When producing this substance, the frogs may also lie on their backs to show the color of their bellies, indicating their potential danger, holding up their limbs and arching their heads. This does not always work, and in addition to predation by birds and mammals, grass snakes and other water dwelling snakes are known to the consume the toads without any ill effect.

== Research ==
=== Bombesin ===
The skin of Oriental fire-bellied toads contains bombesin, a peptide first isolated from their relatives, European fire-bellied toads (and later other types of frogs, in the genera Rana and Phyllomedusa). Among other effects, bombesin hinders gastric functions in mammals, including dogs, cats, rabbits, and rodents. Later studies on B. orientalis discovered that the peptide came in three separate forms.

=== Intelligence ===
Oriental fire-bellied toads are rapid learners, especially compared to other frogs. In an experiment, slightly dehydrated toads were found able solve both simple and more complex mazes using water as a reinforcement, unlike other types of frogs (members of Rana, Bufo, and Hyla simply either did not try or leapt around aimlessly). In a simple T-maze, with their target on the right side, 80% had navigated their way successfully in only three days, with 100% having finished after four days. The left side proved more challenging, with 80% finished in three days, but the rest not done until day eight.

=== As a model organism ===
As common amphibians, B. orientalis make excellent model organisms for studying the effects of pollution and toxic chemicals on local environments. Studies involving them having demonstrated the harmful effects of carbaryl (which include bent trunks, thicker-set bodies, bent tails, and ventral blistering) and nonylphenol (which significantly decreased overall survival rates) on amphibian embryonic development.

== Conservation status ==
The oriental fire-bellied toad was listed as least concern species by the International Union for Conservation of Nature with little threat of extinction, although the population is declining, but not at a significant rate. They occur in many protected areas in China and the Koreas, as well as six Russian nature reserves. The population in the Russian part of their range may be more threatened than others. Dangers include pollution, urbanization, and use in traditional Chinese medicine.

== In captivity ==
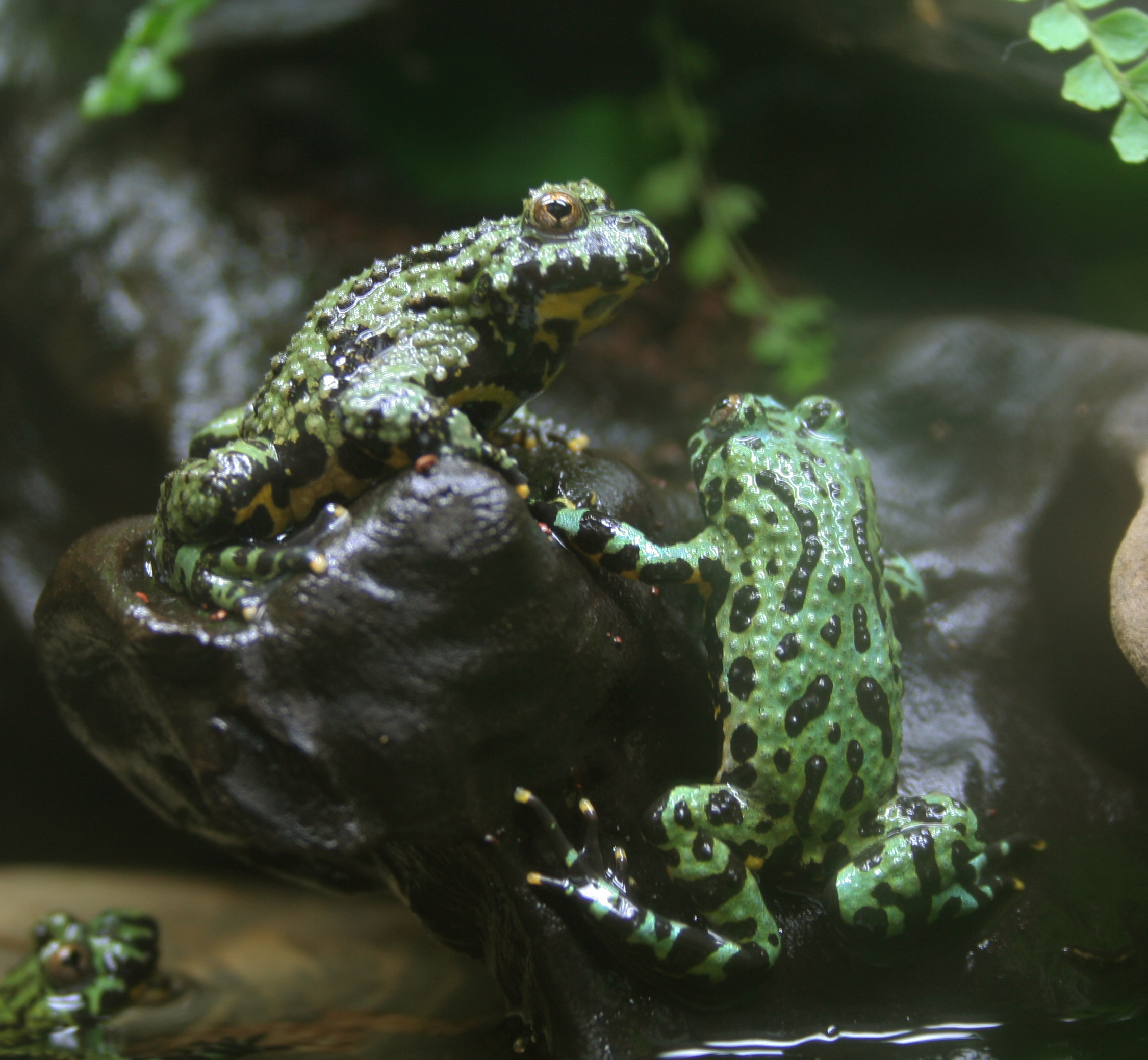
Oriental fire-bellied toads in a terrarium

Bombina orientalis are relatively easy to care for in captivity, requiring little in the way of specialized lighting or heating and readily consuming feeder insects or small feeder fish. Handling can require caution, as although harmless to the skin, the mucus can cause discomfort to the mouth and eyes, however captive individuals generally are less toxic. The toxin does not pose a significant threat to human health. In captivity, Oriental fire-bellied toads often live for around 12 years, but in some cases can live up to 30.
