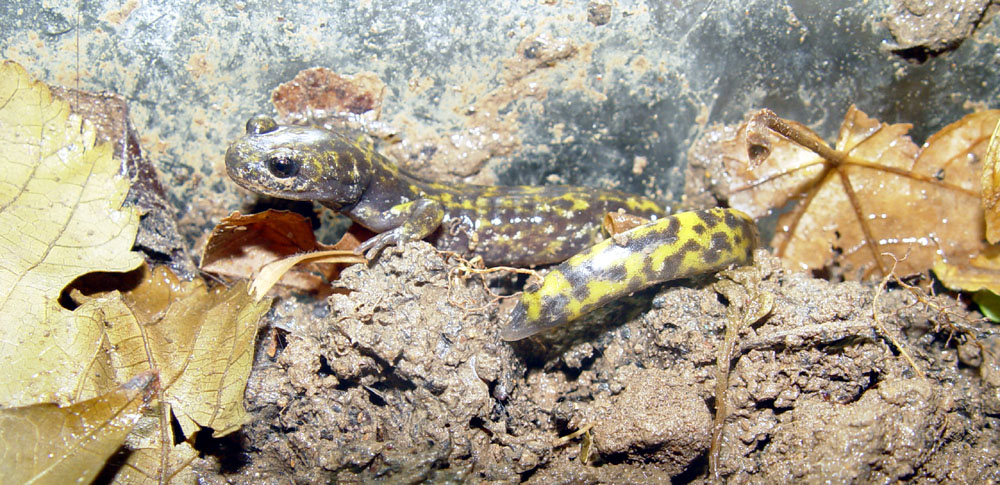

Conservation status
- Vulnerable (IUCN 3.1)

Scientific classification
- Kingdom: Animalia
- Phylum: Chordata
- Class: Amphibia
- Order: Urodela
- Family: Hynobiidae
- Genus: Paradactylodon
- Species: P. persicus

Binomial name
- Paradactylodon persicus (Eiselt & Steiner, 1970)

Synonyms
- Batrachuperus persicus Eiselt and Steiner, 1970; Batrachuperus gorganensis Clergue-Gazeau and Thorn, 1979; Paradactylodon gorganensis Clergue-Gazeau and Thorn, 1979

= Persian brook salamander =

Species of amphibian

The Persian brook salamander or Persian mountain salamander (Paradactylodon persicus) is an endemic amphibian species of salamander in the family Hynobiidae found in Iran and possibly Azerbaijan.

== Description ==
Adults have 4 fingers and toes, are darkly colored with scattered yellow spots and have rectangular heads and rounded tails oftentimes longer than the rest of their body. Larvae have large rounded triangular heads with short fin-like tails roughly shorter than the rest of their body and are generally light yellow without any distinct spots. The juveniles complexion darkens and develops mottled yellow spots while their head become more rectangular, and their tails become longer and more rounded. Larvae and juveniles sizes are roughly the same ranging from 4-10 cm while the larger adults commonly range from 15-20 cm. The total length of the longest specimen was 26.85cm. Larvae have external gills that suit their solely aquatic habitats while adults replace these with lungs as they mature.

== Taxonomy ==
Phylogenetic analysis has indicated that populations of the former Paradactylodon gorganensis are contained within this species.

== Distribution & habitat ==
The only known populations of this species inhabit the temperate rainforest region along the southwestern tip of the Caspian Sea in Iran. This species is also believed to inhabit parts of Azerbaijan where the temperate rainforest that these salamanders are known to inhabit reaches north however no definitive sightings have been verified. The native range of these salamanders is roughly 2,000 km^{2}, limited almost exclusively to the rivers, inland karsts, and caves of the area due to the aquatic nature of the species.

== Behavior & diet ==
The cave and karst dwelling adults of this species are active at all times of the year while adults in other localities are found hiding in their burrows during the day and are thought to become more active at night. This species typically breeds in running water habitats rather than stagnant water habitats where these stream-type larvae frequent rocky areas of these fast-flowing streams so they have plenty of cover from predators.

At all stages of life these salamanders are carnivorous and known to feed on arthropods and small creatures that share their habitat. Additionally, when dissecting cave dwelling adult specimens researchers discovered (Myotis blythyii) bat remains within the salamanders stomach. This is one of the only known instances of a salamander species preying on the small winged mammals. These salamanders are also known to be cannibalistic as adults and juveniles have been found with larvae of the same species in their stomachs.

== Threats ==
This species occurs in the protected Hyrcanian forest region and has been most recently assessed by The IUCN Red List of Threatened Species in 2008 when it was conclusively listed as near threatened due to habitat loss. The specific threats that fall under habitat loss for this species are urban sprawl around the coast and foothills of the Caspian Sea, agriculture (specifically rice cultivation in this area), logging (siltation in streams that the larvae rely upon), and surface water & groundwater pollution (because this species is so reliant upon aquatic habitats this threat is especially influential). It is also speculated that this species could be threatened by drought periods and collection for the pet trade. Because of increases in threats and a deteriorating climate this species is near qualifying as vulnerable.

Overall little is known about thus reclusive and rare species of salamander. More field surveys are necessary to fathom the reality of this species natural range. Research on what the ecological requirements are for both the larvae and adults of this species is needed to facilitate conservation efforts.
