= Bombinin =

Identifiers
- Symbol: Bombinin
- Pfam: PF05298
- InterPro: IPR007962
- OPM superfamily: 211
- OPM protein: 2ap8
Available protein structures:
- PDB: IPR007962 PF05298 (ECOD; PDBsum)
- AlphaFold: IPR007962; PF05298

The bombinin family of antimicrobial peptides includes the bombinin and maximin proteins from Bombina maxima (Giant fire-bellied toad). Two groups of antimicrobial peptides have been isolated from skin secretions of B. maxima. Peptides in the first group, named maximins 1, 2, 3, 4 and 5, are structurally related to bombinin-like peptides (BLPs). Unlike BLPs, sequence variations in maximins occurred all through the molecules. In addition to the potent antimicrobial activity, cytotoxicity against tumour cells and spermicidal action of maximins, maximin 3 possessed a significant anti-Simian-Human immunodeficiency virus (HIV) activity. Maximins 1 and 3 have been found to be toxic to mice. Peptides in the second group, termed maximins H1, H2, H3 and H4, are homologous with bombinin H peptides.
