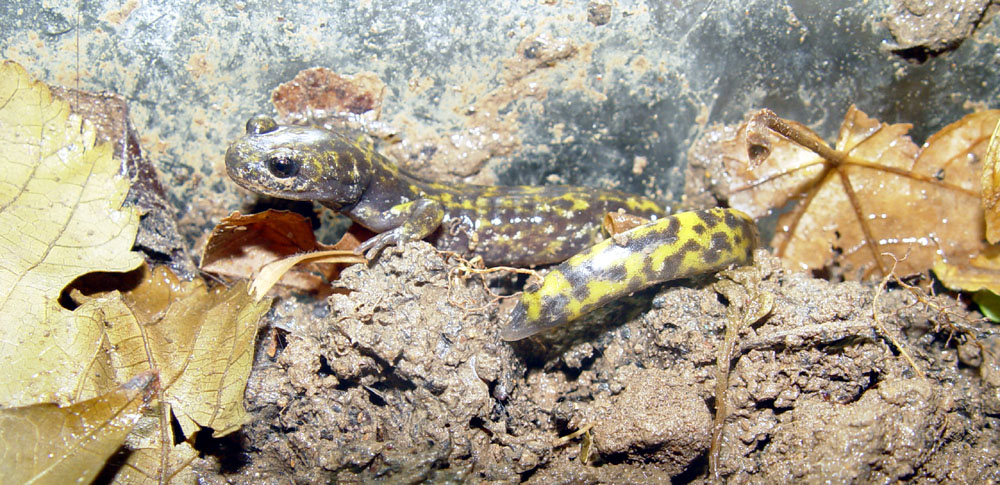
- Paradactylodon persicus

Scientific classification
- Kingdom: Animalia
- Phylum: Chordata
- Class: Amphibia
- Order: Urodela
- Family: Hynobiidae
- Subfamily: Hynobiinae
- Genus: Paradactylodon; Risch, 1984

= Paradactylodon =

Genus of salamanders

Paradactylodon, the mountain salamanders or Middle Eastern stream salamanders, is a genus of salamanders in the family Hynobiidae found in Iran and Afghanistan.

The following species are recognised in the genus Paradactylodon:

- Paradactylodon persicus
- Paradactylodon mustersi
