= Pseudohynobius =

Scientific classification
- Kingdom: Animalia
- Phylum: Chordata
- Class: Amphibia
- Order: Urodela
- Family: Hynobiidae
- Subfamily: Hynobiinae
- Genus: Pseudohynobius; Fei & Yang, 1983

Genus of salamanders

Pseudohynobius is a genus of salamanders in the family Hynobiidae and is endemic to China. It contains these species:

- Pseudohynobius flavomaculatus (Hu and Fei, 1978) (yellow-spotted salamander)
- Pseudohynobius guizhouensis Li, Tian, and Gu, 2010 (Guizhou salamander)
- Pseudohynobius jinfo Wei, Xiong, and Zeng, 2009 (Jinfo Mountain salamander)
- Pseudohynobius kuankuoshuiensis Xu and Zeng, 2007 (Kuankuoshui salamander)
- Pseudohynobius puxiongensis (Fei and Ye, 2000) (Puxiong salamander)
- Pseudohynobius shuichengensis Tian, Gu, Li, Sun, and Li, 1998 (Shuicheng salamander)
