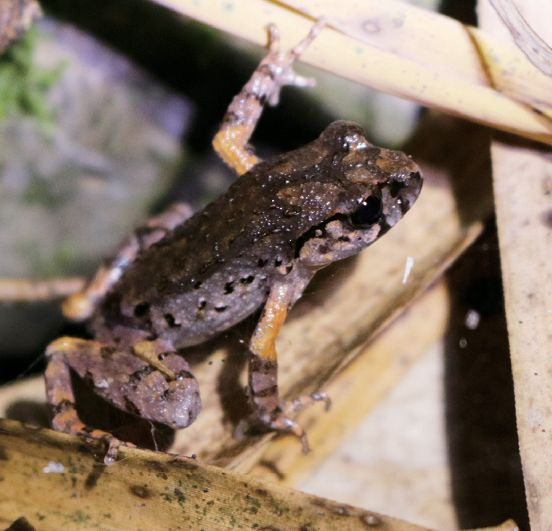
- Holotype in life

Scientific classification
- Kingdom: Animalia
- Phylum: Chordata
- Class: Amphibia
- Order: Anura
- Family: Megophryidae
- Genus: Leptobrachella
- Species: L. suiyangensis

Binomial name
- Leptobrachella suiyangensis Luo, Xiao, Gao, and Zhou, 2020
- Leptobrachella suiyangensis is only known from the Huoqiuba Nature Reserve in Suiyang County, Guizhou, China

= Leptobrachella suiyangensis =

Species of frog

Leptobrachella suiyangensis, also known as Suiyang leaf-litter toad, is a species of frog in the family Megophryidae. It is endemic to Guizhou province in southern China and so far [when?] known only from Huoqiuba Nature Reserve, its type locality in the eponymous Suiyang County.

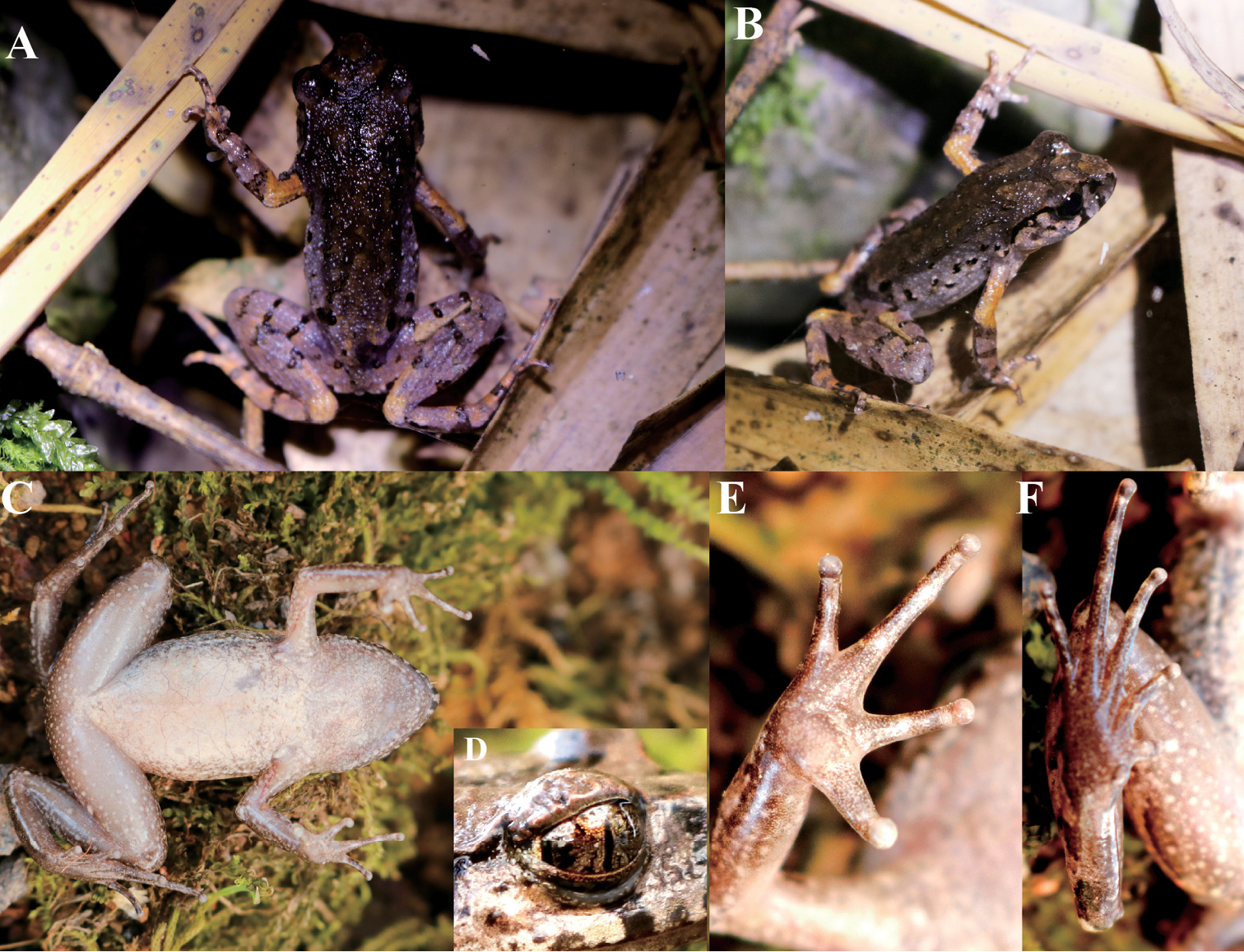
Holotype of Leptobrachella suiyangensis, an adult male. Top row: dorsal views. Bottom left: ventral view. Bottom middle: eye. Bottom right: hand and foot.

== Description ==
Adult males measure 29–30 mm (1.1–1.2 in) and adult females 31–34 mm (1.2–1.3 in) in snout–vent length. The head is slightly longer than it is wide. The snout is slightly protruding. The tympanum is distinct and rounded; the supratympanic fold is also distinct. The finger and toe tips are rounded and slightly swollen. The fingers have no webbing whereas the toes have rudimentary webbing. Skin is dorsally shagreened. Dorsal coloration is purple-brown, turning to brown-purplish between the eyes and the scapular region. There are various dark-brown to black-brown markings. The elbows and upper arms have distinct dark-orange coloration. The ventral surface of the throat is grey-white; chest and belly are yellowish creamy-white. The iris is bicolored: coppery orange on the upper half and silver grey on the lower half.

== Habitat and conservation ==
This species is known only from its type locality at 1,501 m (4,925 ft) above sea level in the Huoqiuba Nature Reserve. The general area is characterized by subtropical evergreen broad-leaved forest and evergreen deciduous broad-leaved mixed forest. The type series was collected from a shallow stream about one half meter wide and ten centimeters deep and from a nearby, well-preserved bamboo forest. During the time of collection in June, males were calling from under bamboo leaves. Others individuals were found perching on or hiding under rocks by the stream side.

As of late 2020, Leptobrachella suiyangensis had not yet been assessed for the IUCN Red List of Threatened Species. The type locality is a reserve, but grazing and herb collection have caused disturbance in the area and could threaten this species. The range of this species might also extend into the adjacent Kuankuoshui National Nature Reserve.
