= Shuicheng salamander =

Conservation status
- Critically Endangered (IUCN 3.1)

Scientific classification
- Kingdom: Animalia
- Phylum: Chordata
- Class: Amphibia
- Order: Urodela
- Family: Hynobiidae
- Genus: Pseudohynobius
- Species: P. shuichengensis

Binomial name
- Pseudohynobius shuichengensis Tian, Gu, Sun and Li, 1998

Species of amphibian

The Shuicheng salamander (Pseudohynobius shuichengensis) is a species of salamander in the family Hynobiidae, endemic to China. Its type locality is Shuicheng in Guizhou Province, and it is not yet known from elsewhere; it is not likely to be widely distributed. It lives in a karstic region. The adults live on the forest floor near streams. Breeding takes places in pools, ponds, or near the springs, and the larvae develop in these habitats. It is threatened by habitat loss and pollution.
