= Yellow-spotted salamander =

Conservation status
- Vulnerable (IUCN 3.1)

Scientific classification
- Kingdom: Animalia
- Phylum: Chordata
- Class: Amphibia
- Order: Urodela
- Family: Hynobiidae
- Genus: Pseudohynobius
- Species: P. flavomaculatus

Binomial name
- Pseudohynobius flavomaculatus (Hu & Fei, 1978)

Synonyms
- Ranodon flavomaculatus (Hu & Fei, 1978)

Species of amphibian

The yellow-spotted salamander (Pseudohynobius flavomaculatus) is a species of salamander in the family Hynobiidae, endemic to China, where it is known from Nanchuan in Chongqing (formerly Sichuan), Suiyang in Guizhou, Lichuan in Hubei, and Sangzhi in Hunan Province. However, genetic methods have revealed cryptic species within the Liua–Pseudohynobius complex, and the actual distribution of the yellow-spotted salamander is turning out to be different. Only animals from Lichuan in Hubei and Sangzhi have been positively identified as being yellow-spotted salamanders, whereas animals collected from Nanchuan were described as a new species, P. jinfo, by Wei et al. in 2009.

The yellow-spotted salamander, known locally as fei, has a total length of 158–189 mm (6.2–7.4 in) in males and 138–180 mm (5.4–7.1 in) in females.
