= Hatzegobatrachus =

Hatzegobatrachus Temporal range: Late Cretaceous, 70.6–65.5 Ma

Scientific classification
- Kingdom: Animalia
- Phylum: Chordata
- Class: Amphibia
- Order: Anura
- Family: Bombinatoridae
- Genus: †Hatzegobatrachus; Venczel & Csiki, 2003

Type species
- † Hatzegobatrachus grigorescui Venczel & Csiki, 2003

Extinct genus of amphibians

Hatzegobatrachus is an extinct genus of toad. It is sometimes considered the earliest known member of the family Bombinatoridae. It is known from the Late Cretaceous Densuş-Ciula Formation and Sard Formation of Romania, in the region that was once Hateg Island.

== See also ==
- Prehistoric amphibian
- List of prehistoric amphibians
