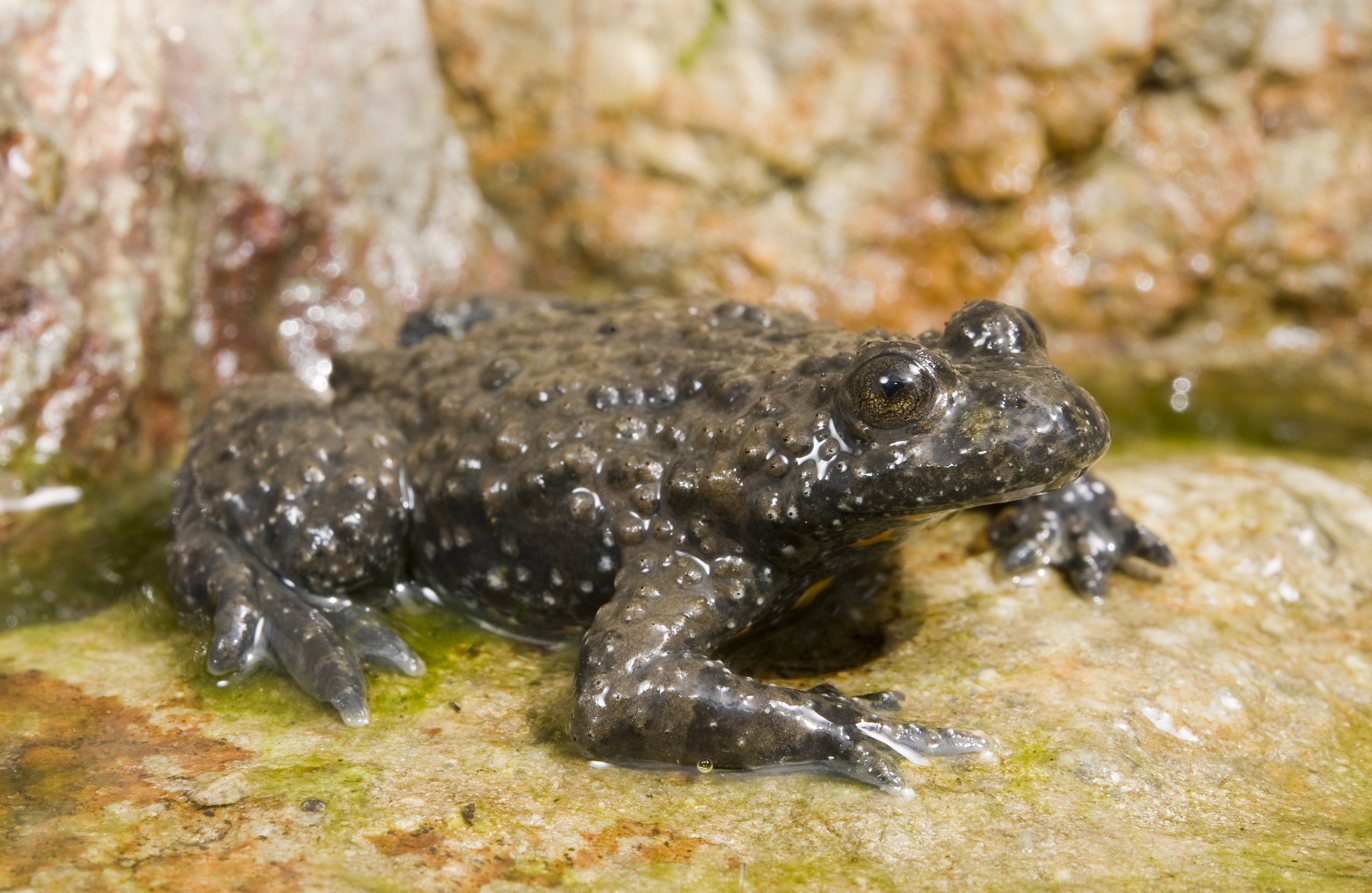

Conservation status
- Endangered (IUCN 3.1)

Scientific classification
- Kingdom: Animalia
- Phylum: Chordata
- Class: Amphibia
- Order: Anura
- Family: Bombinatoridae
- Genus: Bombina
- Species: B. pachypus

Binomial name
- Bombina pachypus (Bonaparte, 1838)
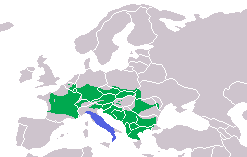
- Distribution of the Apennine yellow-bellied toad (in blue)

= Apennine yellow-bellied toad =

Species of amphibian

The Apennine yellow-bellied toad (Bombina pachypus) is a species of toad in the family Bombinatoridae endemic to Italy. Its natural habitats are temperate forests, temperate grassland, swamps, freshwater marshes, intermittent freshwater marshes, arable land, pastureland, ponds, open excavations, irrigated land, and seasonally flooded agricultural land. It is threatened by habitat loss.

== Description ==
This species was once thought to be a subspecies of the yellow-bellied toad B. variegata. It has a compact body and a rounded snout and the skin of the back is covered with tubercles. The pupil of the eye is triangular. The dorsal surface is dark tan or dark greyish-brown, often with washed-out, bright spots. The underparts, including the inner sides of the limbs, the fingers and toes, is greyish-blue to black-blue with striking, bright yellow to orange spots or patches, usually covering more than half of the underside.

== Distribution and habitat ==
The Apennine yellow-bellied toad is endemic to Italy, where it is found south of the Valley of the River Po, throughout the Apennine Hills and southwards to the tip of the Italian mainland. Its range varies from 20 to 1,700 m (66 to 5,577 ft) above sea level. It is found in ponds and ditches in forests and open areas. It breeds in ponds, wetlands, ditches, ruts, pools, and drinking troughs.

== Behaviour ==
The Apennine yellow-bellied toad is a diurnal species, and hibernates from about November to April. Breeding activity starts soon after the toads leave hibernation, and females lay multiple clutches of a few eggs in temporary water bodies.

This species produces a toxic secretion from its skin. If attacked by a predator, it arches its back to expose its brilliantly coloured aposematic underparts which give warning of its toxicity.

== Status ==
This toad seems to be declining in numbers, although it is not clear why. Changes in agricultural practices may partly be to blame or the fungal disease chytridiomycosis may be the cause. The IUCN has listed it as "Endangered", and believes further investigation should be undertaken into its decline.
