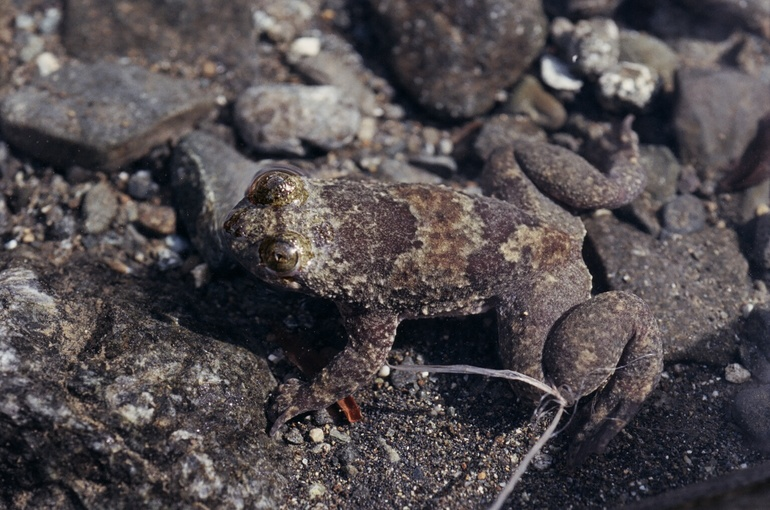

Conservation status
- Near Threatened (IUCN 3.1)

Scientific classification
- Kingdom: Animalia
- Phylum: Chordata
- Class: Amphibia
- Order: Anura
- Family: Bombinatoridae
- Genus: Barbourula
- Species: B. busuangensis

Binomial name
- Barbourula busuangensis Taylor and Noble, 1924

= Barbourula busuangensis =

Species of amphibian

Barbourula busuangensis is a species of frog in the family Bombinatoridae. It is also known under the common names Philippine flat-headed frog, Palawan flat-headed frog, Busuanga jungle toad, Busuanga disk-tongued toad, and Philippine aquatic frog. It is endemic to the Busuanga, Culion, Balabac, and Palawan islands in the Philippines. It is an inhabitant of clear-water streams and is threatened by habitat loss.

== Description ==
Barbourula busuangensis is a large aquatic species of frog. Its body is flattened dorso-ventrally and its nostrils and eyes are located at the top of its head. It has no external tympani. Both fore and hind limbs are robust and powerful, and the digits of the hands are webbed as well as those of the feet. The surface of the body is covered with fine tubercles. This frog is a dark greenish-black in colour with some faint pale green hatching and spotting on the hind limbs.

== Distribution and habitat ==
This frog is endemic to the western Philippines where it is present on Busuanga, Culion, Balabac, and Palawan. Its typical habitat is fast-flowing, unpolluted streams in lowland tropical forests at elevations below 800 m (2,600 ft) asl. It often floats on the surface, but is very wary and dives to the bottom and hides if it is disturbed.

== Breeding ==
Little is known of the breeding habits of this rare species, and tadpoles have not been observed. Pregnant females have been found with some large, unpigmented eggs. This led researchers to hypothesize that development may be direct without an intervening tadpole stage. Attempts to get the species to breed in the laboratory have been unsuccessful.

== Status ==
The IUCN lists this frog as "near threatened". The reasons given are that it occurs in a few locations, its populations are fragmented, and its numbers are declining. The main threats it faces are degradation of its habitat, changing agricultural practices, quarrying, mining and pollution of the streams with runoff from agricultural land.
