= Jinfo Mountain salamander =

Scientific classification
- Kingdom: Animalia
- Phylum: Chordata
- Class: Amphibia
- Order: Urodela
- Family: Hynobiidae
- Genus: Pseudohynobius
- Species: P. jinfo

Binomial name
- Pseudohynobius jinfo Wei, G., Xiong, J.-L., Hou, M., Zeng, X.-M., 2009

Species of amphibian

The Jinfo Mountain salamander (Pseudohynobius jinfo) is a species of salamander in the family Hynobiidae endemic to China, known only from Nanchuan District in Chongqing (formerly Sichuan). Its type locality is a spring-fed pond on Mount Jinfo. P. jinfo specimens from Nanchuan were first assumed to be yellow-spotted salamanders (P. flavomaculatus), but genetic methods, and later on, discovery of adult salamanders, allowed them to be identified as a new species.
