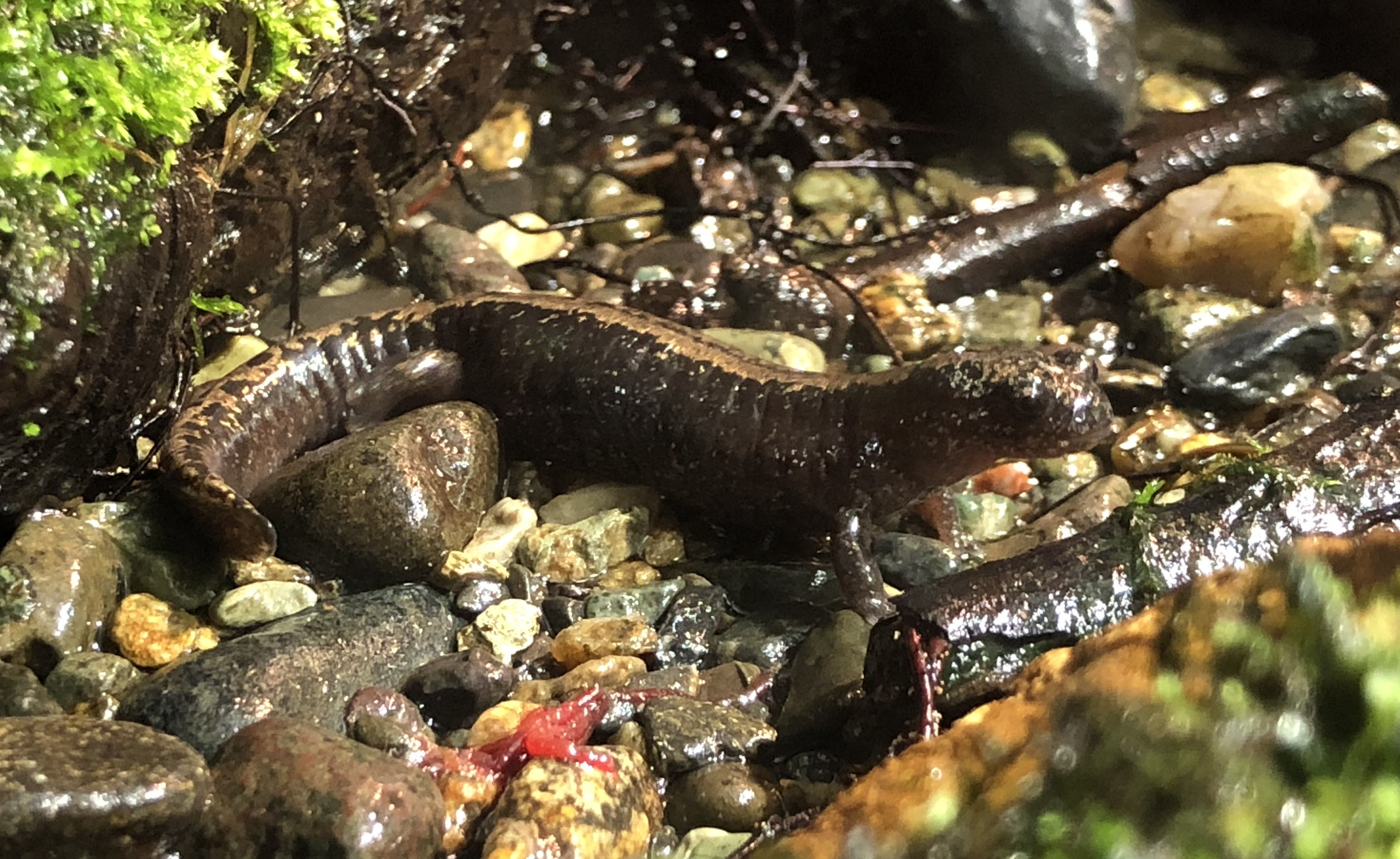
- Salamandrella keyserlingii

Scientific classification
- Kingdom: Animalia
- Phylum: Chordata
- Class: Amphibia
- Order: Urodela
- Family: Hynobiidae
- Subfamily: Hynobiinae
- Genus: Salamandrella; Dybowski, 1870

= Salamandrella =

Genus of salamanders

Salamandrella is a genus of salamanders in the family Hynobiidae.

It contains these species:

- Salamandrella keyserlingii Dybowski, 1870
- Salamandrella tridactyla Nikolskii, 1905
