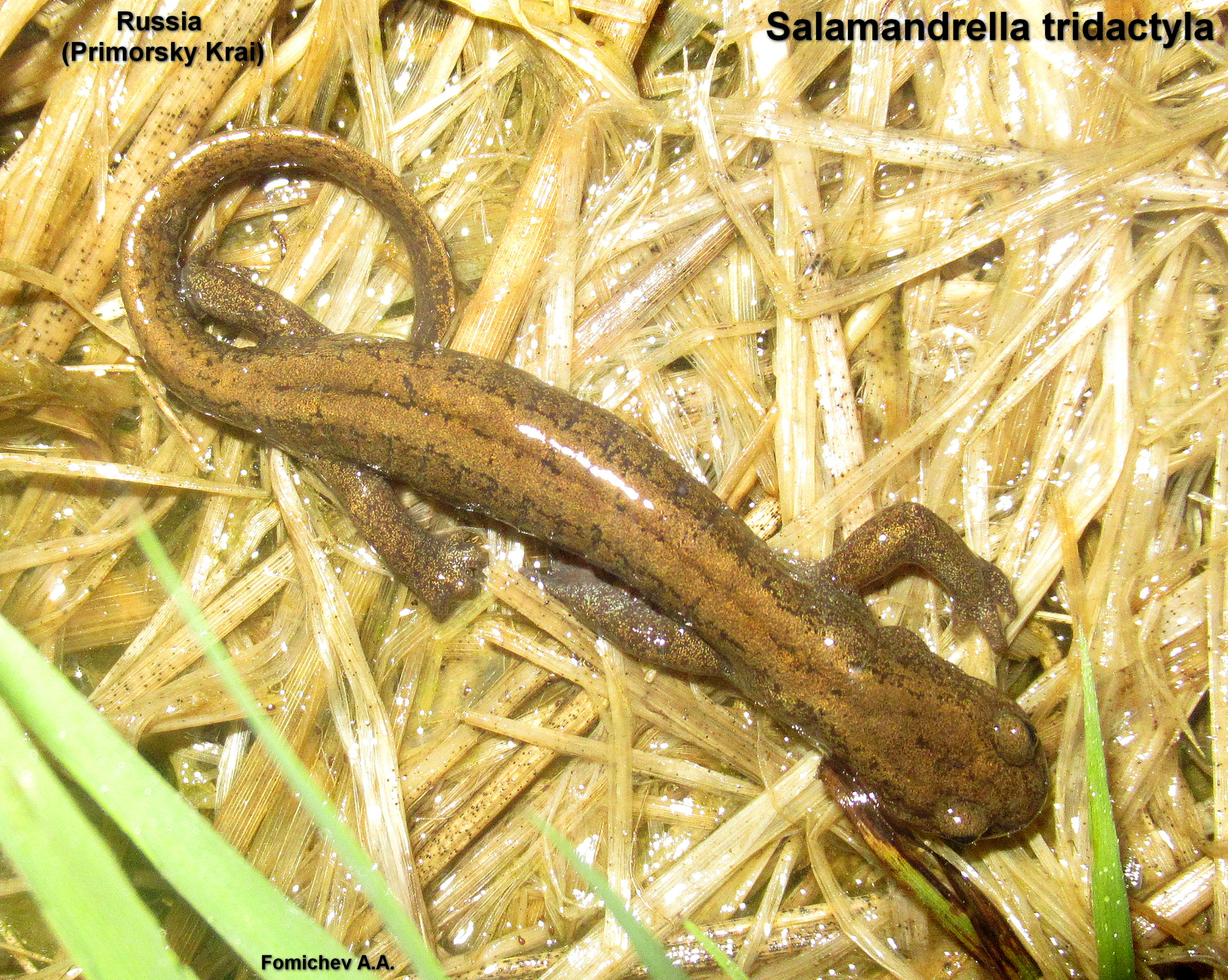

Scientific classification
- Domain: Eukaryota
- Kingdom: Animalia
- Phylum: Chordata
- Class: Amphibia
- Order: Urodela
- Family: Hynobiidae
- Genus: Salamandrella
- Species: S. tridactyla

Binomial name
- Salamandrella tridactyla (Nikolskii, 1906)

Synonyms
- Salamandrella schrenckii auct.; Salamandrella keyserlingii tridactyla

= Salamandrella tridactyla =

Species of amphibian

Salamandrella tridactyla is a species of salamander in the family Hynobiidae, occurring in Far East Russia and the northernmost China.
