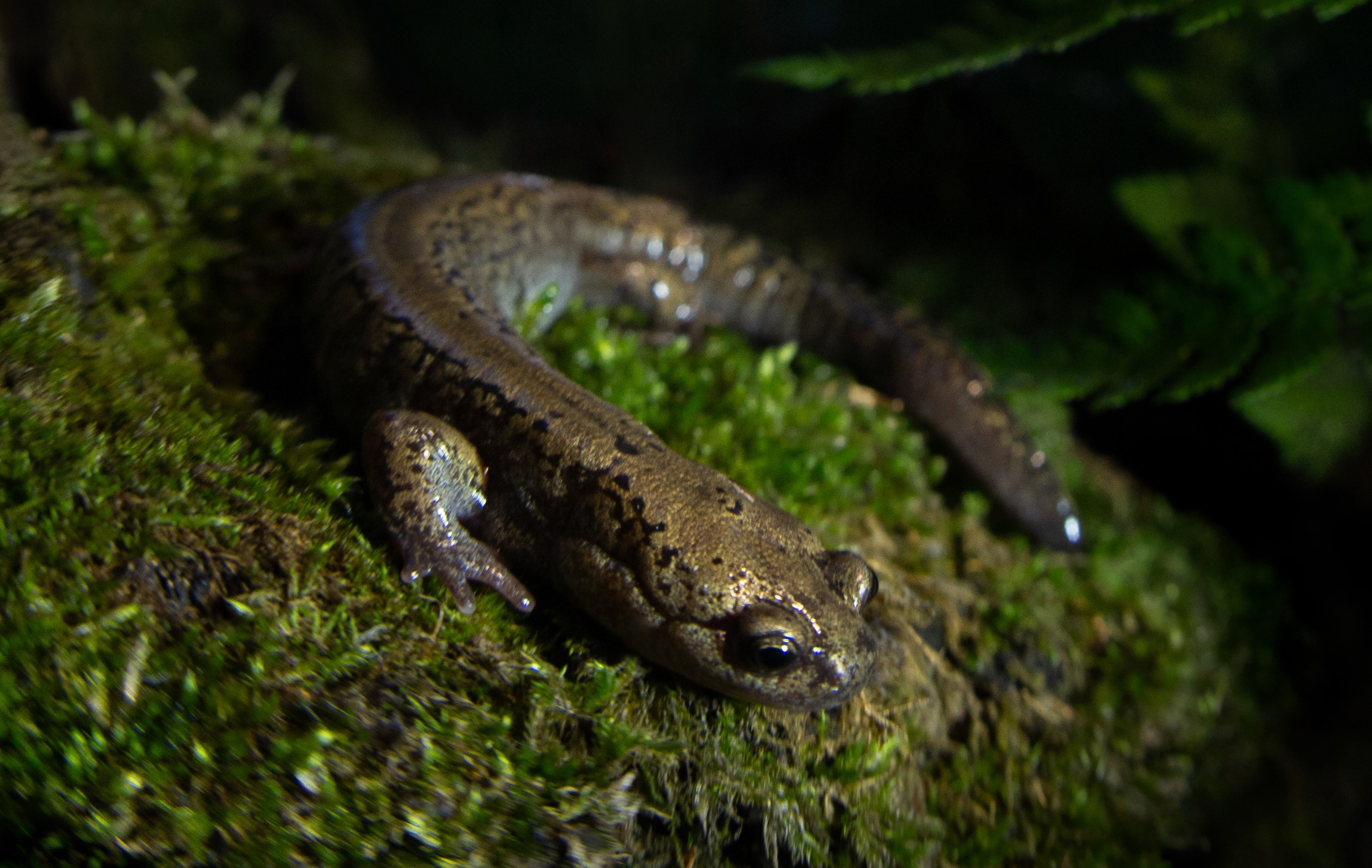

Conservation status
- Least Concern (IUCN 3.1)

Scientific classification
- Kingdom: Animalia
- Phylum: Chordata
- Class: Amphibia
- Order: Urodela
- Family: Hynobiidae
- Genus: Salamandrella
- Species: S. keyserlingii

Binomial name
- Salamandrella keyserlingii Dybowski, 1870

Synonyms
- Hynobius keyserlingii Boulenger, 1910

= Salamandrella keyserlingii =

Species of amphibian

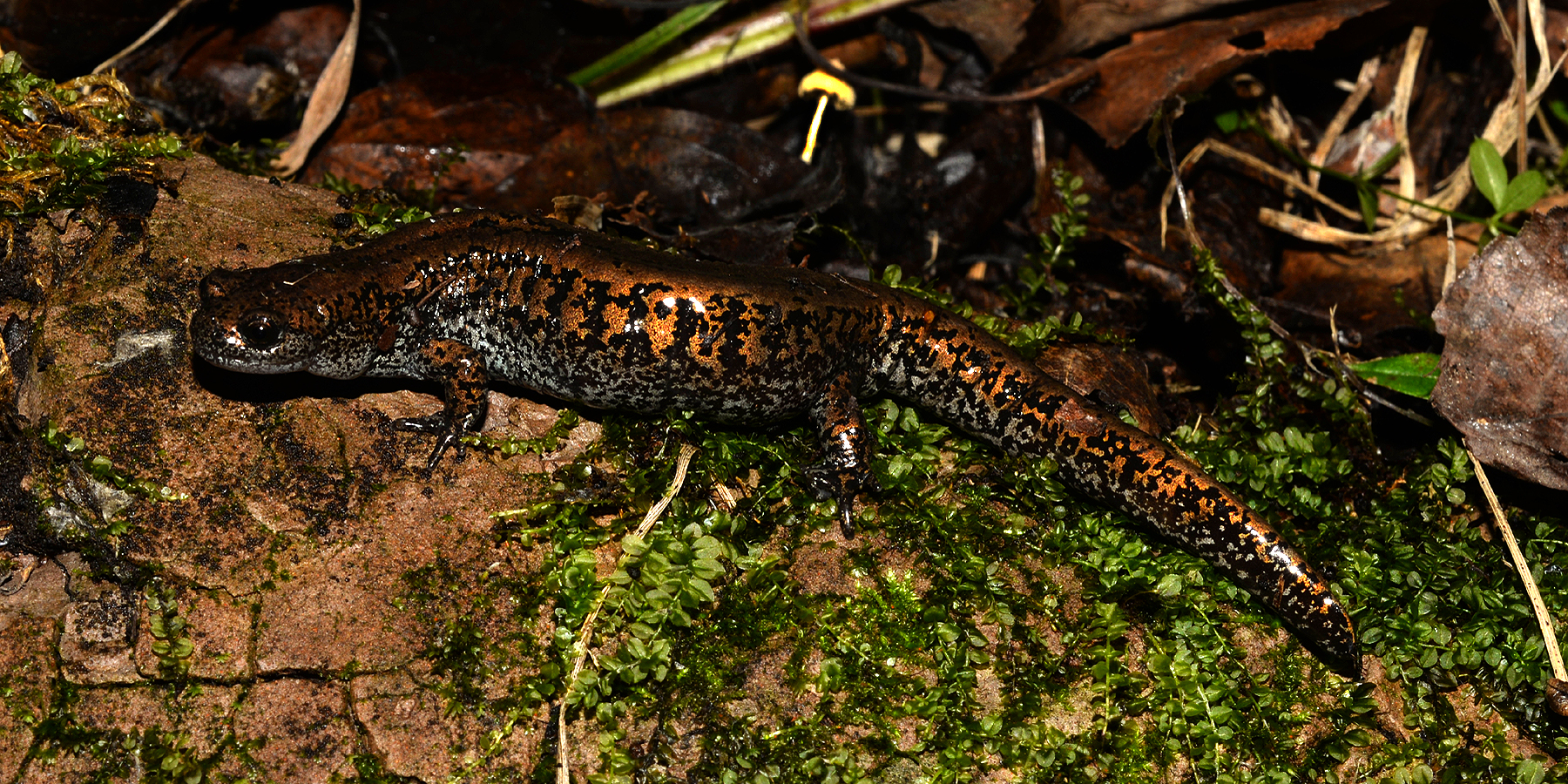
Siberian salamander (Salamandrella keyserlingii), near Wuying, Heilongjiang, China (8 September 2016)

Salamandrella keyserlingii, the Siberian salamander, is a species of salamander found in Northeast Asia. It lives in wet woods and riparian groves.

== Distribution ==
It is found primarily in Siberia east of the Sosva River and the Urals, in the East Siberian Mountains, including the Verkhoyansk Range, northeast to the Anadyr Highlands, east to the Kamchatka Peninsula and south into Manchuria, with outlying populations also in northern Kazakhstan and Mongolia, northeastern China, and on the Korean Peninsula. It is believed to be extirpated from South Korea. An isolated population exists on Hokkaidō, Japan, in the Kushiro Shitsugen National Park. A breeding ground of Siberian salamanders in Paegam, South Hamgyong, is designated North Korean natural monument #360.

== Description ==
Adults are from 9.0 to 12.5 cm in length. Their bodies are bluish-brown in color, with a purple stripe along the back. Thin, dark brown stripes occur between and around the eyes, and also sometimes on the tail. Four clawless toes are on each foot. The tail is longer than the body. Males are typically smaller than females.

The species is known for surviving deep freezes (as low as −50 °C). They accomplish this by losing one fourth of their body weight through water loss and liver shrinkage, and by increasing the concentration of glycerol in their body.

== Discovery ==
The Polish naturalist Benedykt Dybowski published the original description of the species in 1870 based on a series of specimens from Lake Baikal, and other localities in Russia, naming it Salamandrella Keyserlingii. In 1910 George A. Boulenger transferred it to the genus Hynobius but his arrangement was not wildly accepted by subsequent taxonomists.

== General behavior ==
The Siberian salamander is fairly nocturnal, foraging above ground at night and staying under moist logs or woody debris during the day.

== Habitat ==
Within its extensive range, the habitat of the Siberian salamander is wet conifer, mixed deciduous forests in the taiga and riparian grooves in the tundra and forest steppe. They can be found near ephemeral or permanent pools, wetlands, sedge meadows, off near oxbow lakes.

== Reproduction ==
Their breeding season occur during May or beginning of June, in pools of water. A single egg sac contains 50–80 eggs on average, with a female typically laying up to 240 eggs in a season. The light-brown eggs hatch three to four weeks after being laid, releasing larval salamanders of 11–12 mm in length.
