= Unkenreflex =

Defensive posture of some amphibians

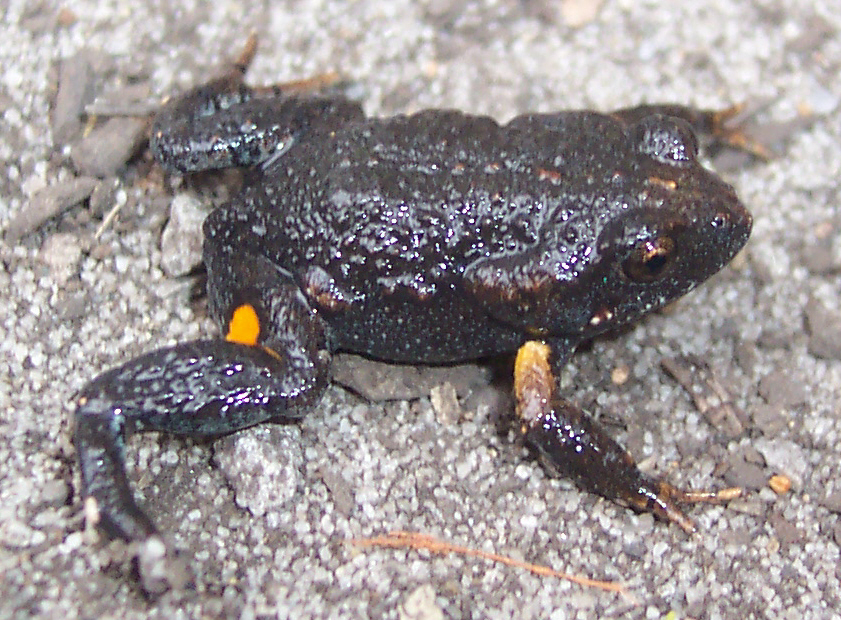
A dusky toadlet displaying patches normally concealed

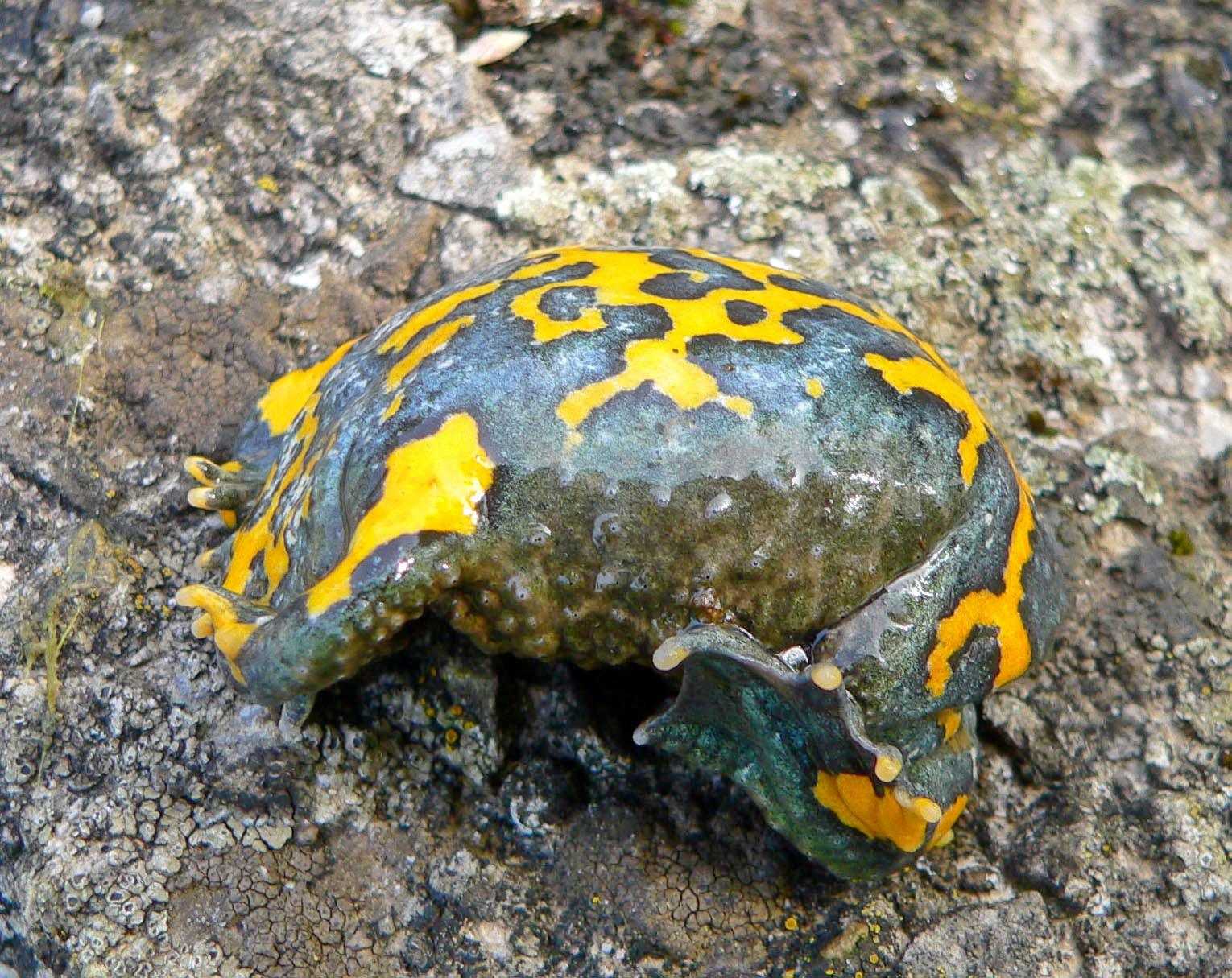
The underside of a yellow-bellied toad

Unkenreflex – interchangeably referred to as unken reflex (Unke is the German word for fire-bellied toads) – is a defensive posture adopted by several branches of the amphibian class, including salamanders, toads, and certain species of frogs. Implemented most often in the face of an imminent attack by a predator, unkenreflex is characterized by the subject’s contortion or arching of its body to reveal previously hidden bright colors of the ventral side, tail, or inner limb; the subject remains immobile while in unkenreflex.

During the course of unkenreflex, the amphibian in question releases bufotoxins from its parotid glands, tenses its entire body, and swallows air to bloat itself in an attempt to look larger. These secretions, along with the aposematic coloring common among the amphibians which display unkenreflex, serve as a warning to nearby predators that the amphibian may be poisonous.

Not all amphibians which display unkenreflexes possess aposematic coloring, nor do all amphibians display unkenreflex to the same degree. Certain species of anurans, such as the adult male Rana macrocnemis, only half-complete unkenreflex (also called low-intensity, or partial unken reflex) by only twisting its body slightly and not revealing the entire underside coloring, or by shielding their face with raised feet that have dramatic coloration, or by curling their tail and exposing the tail's underside. This half completion of unkenreflex can be found both in species that display aposematic coloring and those that do not; unkenreflex is not entirely limited to poisonous amphibians.

This behavior is named after the fire-bellied toad (German: Unke; combining form: Unken-) which exhibits this reflex.

== See also ==
- Signalling theory
