= Bombina microdeladigitora =

Conservation status
- Least Concern (IUCN 3.1)

Scientific classification
- Kingdom: Animalia
- Phylum: Chordata
- Class: Amphibia
- Order: Anura
- Family: Bombinatoridae
- Genus: Bombina
- Species: B. microdeladigitora

Binomial name
- Bombina microdeladigitora Tian & Wu, 1978

Synonyms
- List: Bombina fortinuptialis Hu and Wu in Liu, Hu, Tian, and Wu, 1978; Bombina fortinuptialis Tian and Wu In Hu, Tian, and Wu, 1981; Bombina (Glandula) microdeladigitora Tian and Hu, 1985; Bombina (Glandula) fortinuptialis Tian and Hu, 1985; Bombina (Grobina) microdeladigitora Dubois, 1987; Bombina (Grobina) fortinuptialis Dubois, 1987; Bombina lichuanensis Ye and Fei in Ye, Fei, and Hu, 1993; Bombina (Grobina) lichuanensis Fei, Ye, Huang, Jiang, and Xie, 2005; Bombina maxima microdeladigitora Yu, Yang, Zhang, and Rao, 2007

Species of amphibian

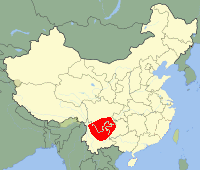
This image shows where Bombina maximae is distributed.

Bombina microdeladigitora is a species of toad in the family Bombinatoridae endemic to Guangxi, Hubei and Sichuan in China. It is commonly known by several names including Guangxi firebelly toad, Hubei firebelly toad, large-spined bell toad, Lichuan bell toad, small-webbed bell toad, and Yunnan firebelly toad. Its natural habitats are subtropical or tropical moist montane forests, temperate forests, rivers, swamps, and freshwater marshes. It is threatened by habitat loss.
