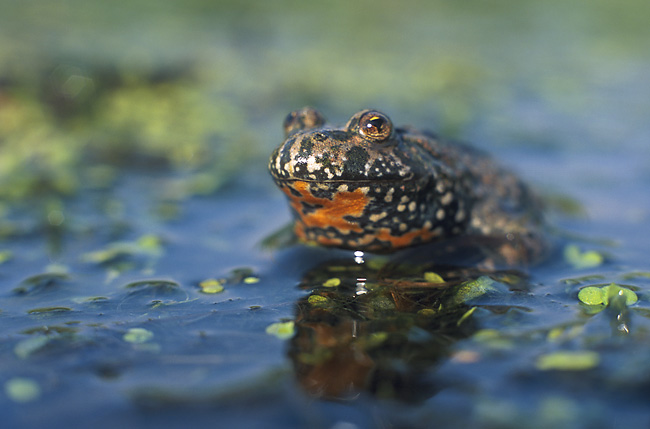
- European fire-bellied toad (Bombina bombina)

Scientific classification
- Kingdom: Animalia
- Phylum: Chordata
- Class: Amphibia
- Order: Anura
- Family: Bombinatoridae
- Genus: Bombina; Oken, 1816

Species
- See text

Synonyms
- List: Bombinator Merrem, 1820; Bombitator Wagler, 1830; Glandula Tian and Hu, 1985; Grobina Dubois, 1987

= Fire-bellied toad =

Fire-bellied toads

Genus of amphibians

The fire-bellied toads are a group of six species of small toads (most species typically no longer than 1.6 in or 4.1 cm) belonging to the genus Bombina.

The name "fire-bellied" is derived from the brightly colored red- or yellow-and-black patterns on the toads' ventral regions, which act as aposematic coloration, a warning to predators of the toads' reputedly foul taste. The other parts of the toads' skins are green or dark brown. When confronted with a potential predator, these toads commonly engage in an unkenreflex, Unken- being the combining form of Unke, German for fire-bellied toad. In the unkenreflex, the toad arches its back, raising its front and back legs to display the aposematic coloration of its ventral side.

== Species ==
The currently recognized species are:

Image	Name	Distribution
	Bombina bombina (Linnaeus, 1761) – European fire-bellied toad	mainland Europe
	Bombina microdeladigitora (Liu, Hu & Yang, 1960) – Hubei firebelly toad, and other names	Guangxi, Hubei and Sichuan in China.
	Bombina maxima (Boulenger, 1905) – Yunnan firebelly toad	Yunnan, China and likely to Myanmar.
	Bombina orientalis (Boulenger, 1890) – Oriental fire-bellied toad	Korea, northeastern China, and adjacent parts of Russia.
	Bombina pachypus (Bonaparte, 1838) – Apennine yellow-bellied toad	Italy.
	Bombina variegata (Linnaeus, 1758) – yellow-bellied toad	middle and southern Europe

== Biology ==
The female of the species typically lays 80–300 eggs that can be found hanging off plant stems. The offspring develop in pools or puddles. Their metamorphosis is complete within a few weeks, peaking in July–August. The toadlets attain a length of 12–15 mm. The eggs, laid in August, metamorphose only after the winter, with the toadlets attaining a length of 3–5 cm. These toadlets still have white bellies.

Tadpoles eat mainly algae and higher plants. The young toads and the adult toads consume insects, such as flies and beetles, shrimp and larvae; but also annelid worms and terrestrial arthropods. Fire-bellied toads are sometimes active during the day, but are more so during the night. The mating call of the male sounds like a dog's bark, rather than the typical drawn out croaking groan.

== Distribution and habitat ==
The species can be found both in Europe and in areas in Asia with a moderate climate.

All kinds of toads prefer habitats of stagnant water, which they are reluctant to leave. The fire-bellied toad lives primarily in a continental climate in standing water or calmer backwaters of rivers or ponds. The species can also be found in flood pools and in floodplains. The yellow-bellied species typically live at higher altitude, where they are primarily found in small bodies of water like ponds or water-filled ruts, often near small mountain streams. The Asian species also live in small bodies of water and can live at altitudes of over 3000 meters.

== Captivity ==
Several species in the genus Bombina, particularly B. orientalis, B bombina, and B. variegata, are commonly kept as exotic pets and are readily available in pet stores. In captivity, they are easily maintained in vivaria, and when provided with proper food and environmental conditions, often prove to be robust, flamboyant, and long-lived amphibians. Captive fire-bellied toads can live from 3–10 years and some captive specimens have reached over 20 years.

In captivity, they eat a wide variety of food, including crickets, moths, minnows, blood worms and pinkie mice, though some frogs cannot handle certain foods, due to their size. They can sometimes act very aggressively against each other, particularly males. They have a ferocious appetite. Due to this, its best to monitor their food intake to ensure they're not over eating.

Fire-bellied toads breed extremely easily in captivity. Pet owners can expect to hear their mating calls largely starting in May and continuing to mid-August. Breeding will happen unprovoked by the owner. Younger females will have smaller clutches of around 60 to 80 eggs where older females can lay around 200. Fire-bellied toads bred in captivity will often have darker and less vibrant coloration having a more orange underside. Wild caught specimens tend to be brighter and have deeper red stomachs.

Fire-bellied toads are easy to raise and handle in solitude. This makes them advantageous to study in various sciences.

== Toxicity ==
Fire-bellied toads secrete bombesin and 5-hydroxytryptamine, which cause irritation to the skin and eyes. Most reported exposures are of young children, did not result in major clinical effects, and were treated by rinsing.
