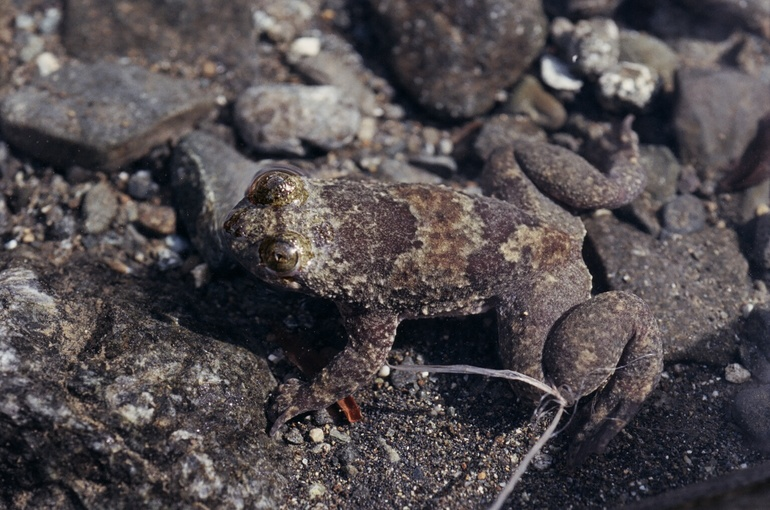
- Barbourula busuangensis

Scientific classification
- Domain: Eukaryota
- Kingdom: Animalia
- Phylum: Chordata
- Class: Amphibia
- Order: Anura
- Family: Bombinatoridae
- Genus: Barbourula; Taylor & Noble, 1924

= Barbourula =

Genus of amphibians

Barbourula is a genus of amphibian commonly referred to as jungle toads. They are small toads of the fire-bellied toad family, Bombinatoridae, found in the Philippines and Borneo.

== Species ==
Image	Name	Distribution
	Philippine flat-headed frog (B. busuangensis) or Busuanga jungle toad	Busuanga, Culion, Balabac, and Palawan islands in the Philippines.
	Bornean flat-headed frog (B. kalimantanensis) or Kalimantan jungle toad	Kalimantan, the Indonesian part of the island of Borneo.
