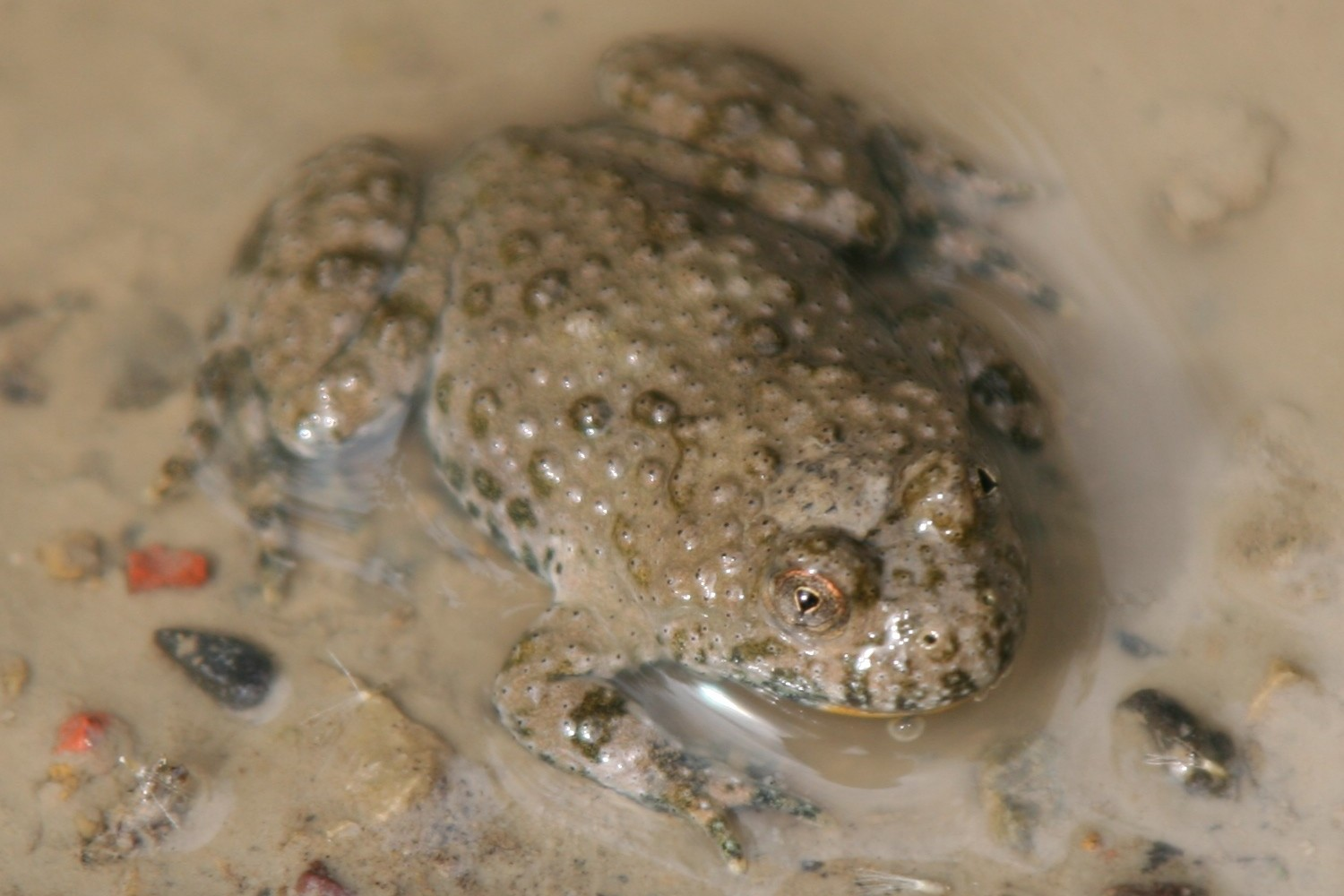

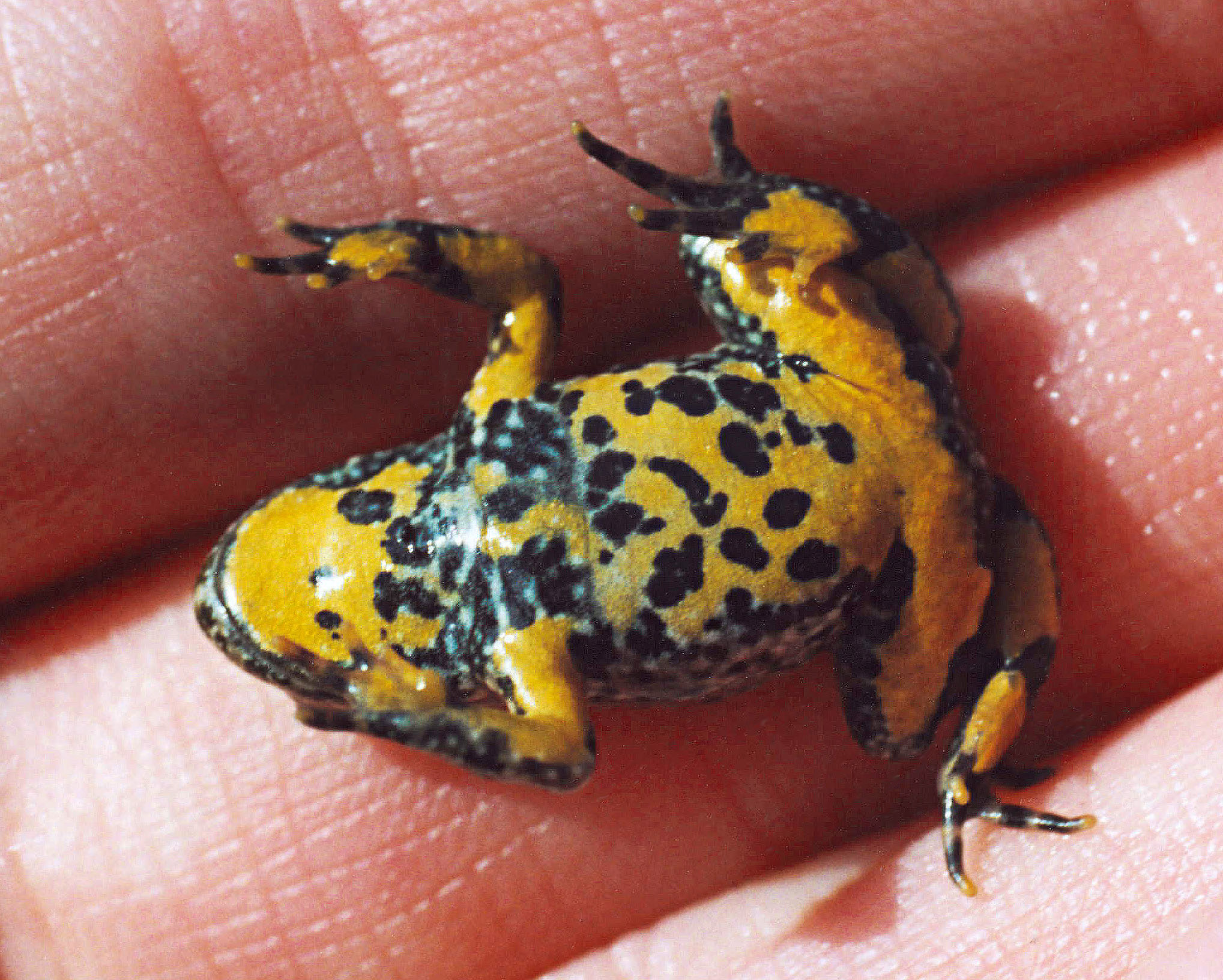

Conservation status
- Least Concern (IUCN 3.1)

Scientific classification
- Kingdom: Animalia
- Phylum: Chordata
- Class: Amphibia
- Order: Anura
- Family: Bombinatoridae
- Genus: Bombina
- Species: B. variegata

Binomial name
- Bombina variegata (Linnaeus, 1758)
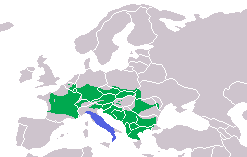
- Distribution of the yellow-bellied toad (in green)

= Yellow-bellied toad =

Species of amphibian

The yellow-bellied toad (Bombina variegata) belongs to the order Anura, the archaeobatrachial family Bombinatoridae, and the genus of fire-bellied toads. The toad is distributed mainly across western Europe as well as a handful of countries in eastern Europe. While the population of the toad is steadily decreasing over time, its numbers are not critical enough to be considered threatened or endangered. Conservation efforts in Germany are taking place to remedy the declining population before it is too late.

The toad is characterized by its bright 'yellow belly,' and has a dark brown and green dorsal body. The toad displays crypsis to camouflage itself from predators. It also positions itself to display yellow coloration when facing a threat. The warts found on the dorsal side allow for the toad's toxins to be readily excreted when needed.

== Description ==
Specimens range from 28–56 mm, typically weighing between 2.3 and 12 g. This places them among the smaller members of the family Bombinatoridae, which can reach sizes of 7 cm. Their top side is grey-brown, often with washed-out, bright spots. Their under side, including the inner sides of the limbs, fingers, and toes, is grey-blue to black-blue with striking, bright yellow to orange spots or patches, usually covering more than half of the underside. Yellow-bellied toads have compact bodies - though not so flat as the related European fire-bellied toad - and a rounded snout. The pupils are heart-shaped, with the eardrums not visible. The overside has numerous warts with raised swirls. A study conducted by researchers from Brill Academic Publishers had concluded that there are sexually dimorphic differences noted within the species. Males of the species have notably longer humerus length resulting in a longer forelimb length; It is believed to give them an advantage while coupling and while fighting other males of the same species.

=== Variation ===
A study conducted by Bogdan Stugren and Stefan Vancea in 1968 on yellow-bellied toads in Romania and the USSR established eight different forms of B. variegata, expanding on the three forms previously posited by Michalowski in 1958. Each of these forms represents a ratio of yellow to black markings on the underside of the toad, ranging from nearly completely yellow (Form 1) to nearly completely black (Form 8). Stugren and Vancea found that the undersides of B. variegata specimens from northern regions typically had greater coverage by black markings than those that were found in southern regions.

== Habitat and distribution ==
The yellow-bellied toad is found in mountainous regions, typically in Western Europe. Within Europe, two species of Bombina exist, Bombina variegata and Bombina bombina. Due to postglacial advance of the latter, Bombina variegata has been found in lower numbers in comparison. The yellow-bellied toad is also found in a much smaller, more isolated, region. France, Germany, Belgium, and the Netherlands are the most common locations in which the toad would be found. Due to habitat disturbances, the areas of occupancy for the yellow-bellied toads have seen a significant decrease in size.

== Conservation ==
Factors associated with climate change, including habitat loss, loss of genetic variation and increase in disease spread have all greatly contributed to the decline of the Yellow-bellied toad. It is important to obtain accurate information about the exact issues plaguing the population at a local, regional, and continental scale. Each level requires a different solution and multiple conservation efforts must be performed to get the species outside of endangered. The species has been largely isolated in recent years due to habitat complications, the largest of which is fragmentation. The reduced genetic diversity can arise from the known habitat fragmentation or the result of post-glacial dispersal, resulting in high levels of inbreeding. In populations that are affected by both, the decline in genetic diversity is evident. Current conservation efforts must focus on the improvement of habitat in an effort to increase genetic diversity.

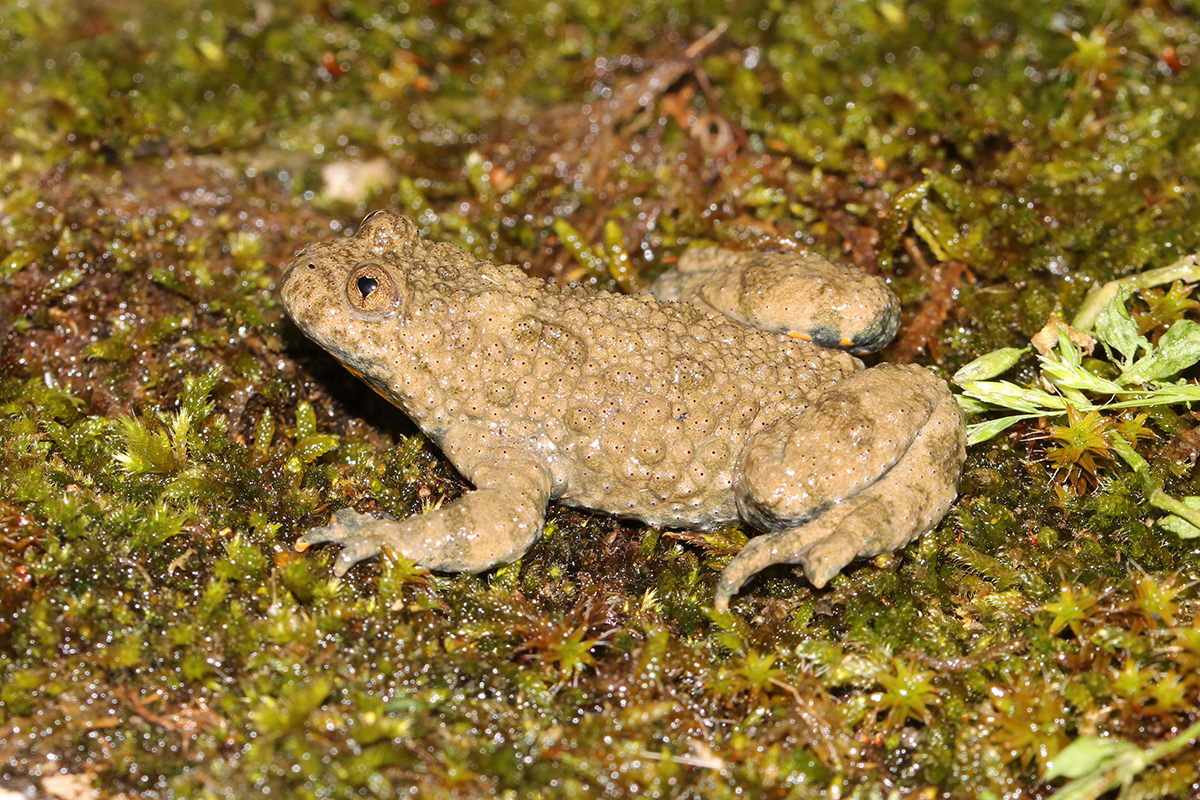
Yellow-bellied toad (Bombina variegata)

The yellow-bellied toad is endangered in Germany. Experiments have been done in an attempt to increase the current population by moving individuals in higher density areas to areas with low populations of the frog. Due to this movement, the ability of the frog to adapt its coloration to suit the environment they are placed in is critical to their survival. Variation in coloration plasticity amongst individuals in the species forces researchers to consider assessing an individual's ability to change coloration prior to relocation. Another issue arising with the relocation of some individuals to another habitat is the spread of disease that can come with it. Ensuring individuals of the species have a better chance of interaction would increase the negative effects habitat fragmentation has had. Therefore, on a continental scale, conservation efforts should focus on the creation of metapopulations as a counteractive mechanism, allowing for more interactions to take place and increasing variation through breeding.

== Reproduction and life cycle ==
Female yellow-bellied toads have the ability to produce offspring multiple times each mating season and long-lived individuals are possible. However, to find a female actually producing offspring multiple times per year is rare. Female reproductive output is also very low, having the capacity to lay over 200 eggs at a given time, but typically seen to only lay about 40. This is because there is little incentive to produce offspring in conditions when adult survival is high and offspring have a more variable likelihood of survival.

=== Life span ===
The life span of yellow-bellied toads encompasses the broad range of 5–23 years. Mortality rates directly determine the average lifespan. The range an individual falls in the fast-slow continuum is dependent on factors such as climate, habitat, and food availability. Climate especially plays the largest extrinsic role as it mediates the predictability of a habitat for an individual as well as the availability of breeding sites. The risk of predation is another factor that plays a large role in the life span of an individual. The yellow-bellied toad has defense mechanisms such as skin-secreting toxins that decrease its appeal to predators, allowing for a longer life span. Interestingly, in the yellow-bellied toad, specific populations exhibit a wide range of life spans across the fast-slow continuum, with climate conditions accounting for a significant amount of variation.

=== Life cycle ===
Tadpoles develop rapidly and can reach 55mm in length. They have a blunt tail and are typically grayish-brown or, in rare cases, transparent. Tadpoles and eggs are vulnerable to predation from various small pond-dwelling creatures, such as leeches, fish, and some aquatic beetles. A study published in 2016 in the Canadian Journal of Zoology indicated that tadpoles in warmer water develop more quickly than those in cooler climates, meant to mimic the differing environments found in forested areas and sunny quarries.

== Mating ==
=== Mate searching behavior ===
Mating calls

To maximize mating for a male, some yellow-bellied male toads will engage in water-wave-producing behavior. This is where a male will kick its hind legs into a small body of water, generating a wave-like pattern. This pattern not only attracts females but is a mechanism of making a male's territory known. Since yellow-bellied toads have very specific, typically risky, breeding sites, having a territory is very important since the highest chance of offspring survival occurs ponds that last longer. Not all males can exhibit this wave-generating behavior because it is exclusive to ponds of a specific depth.

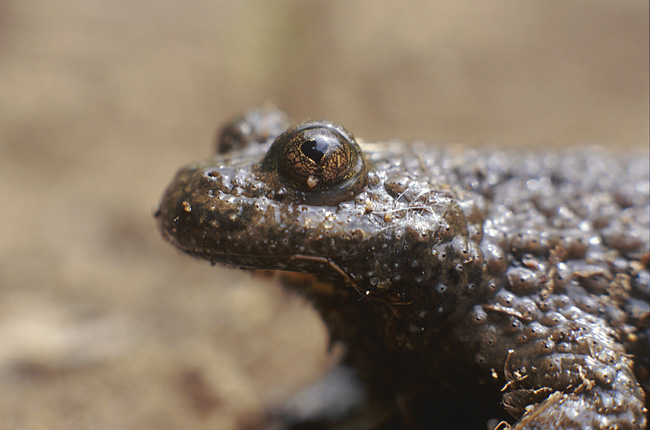
Note the heart-shaped pupils

=== Male/male interactions ===
In the instance where the owner of a territory comes into contact with an intruder, the owner will move towards the intruder and engage in a fight. The fight consists of each male trying to climb the other's back, with the winner eventually holding the other frog down through its legs while climbing its back. The loser immediately swims away while the winner begins exhibiting wave-producing behavior at very high frequencies, marking its territory.

== Parental care ==
=== Site selection for egg-laying ===
The yellow-bellied toad has the ability to breed in unpredictable habitats and locations, including shallow pools that have the ability to disappear overnight. Within the Bombinatoridae family, the yellow-bellied toad is the only species that chooses to breed in such unpredictable sites.

The yellow-bellied toad lays eggs in ponds of a particular temperature and duration. When given the choice between a warm pond, or a cooler one, the frog will lay its eggs in the warmer pool because of heat being conducive for healthy egg growth and development. Therefore, laying in warmer ponds increases the reproductive fitness of the frog.The frog would also prefer ponds that persist for an intermediate period of time because laying eggs in a pond that persists for a long time risks the introduction of a large number of predators to the eggs while short-lived ponds have too few as well as carrying the risk of desiccation. A key component of site selection is the ability for rapid development to occur. Site selection and rapid development are key to survival because most deaths occur at this stage. It was found that pond duration, rather than risk of predation is the most critical factor to site selection. Pond desiccation, unlike predation, has the ability to kill an entire group of tadpoles or eggs.

== Protective coloration and behavior ==
The frog's displays a darker brown or green coloration on its dorsal body allowing the species to participate in crypsis, thereby giving the frog a camouflage effect against prospective predators. The yellow bellied toad also displays aposematism in its ventral body with varying shades of yellow displayed as a warning signal to predators of its poisonous skin. Different individuals in the yellow-bellied toad species display variations of the darker dorsal and yellow ventral body, depending on their specific location. When placed in lighter or darker environments the frogs are also able to alter the shade of their coloration in an attempt to better disguise themselves. There is a natural variation in coloration amongst the species, with some individuals having a brighter coloration. It was found that these individuals adapted to enhance their crypsis, for example covering themselves with pond soil, suggesting an awareness that their dorsal body does not conceal them perfectly in comparison to their environment. This ability to rapidly change coloration when moving to lighter or darker environments is achieved by the movement of melanosomes, or pigment containing vesicles, to different parts of the cell. The ability to alter the shade of coloration is very important in reducing the amount of time the frog is vulnerable to predators as the longer they stand out amongst other individuals in the species, the higher the risk of predation is.

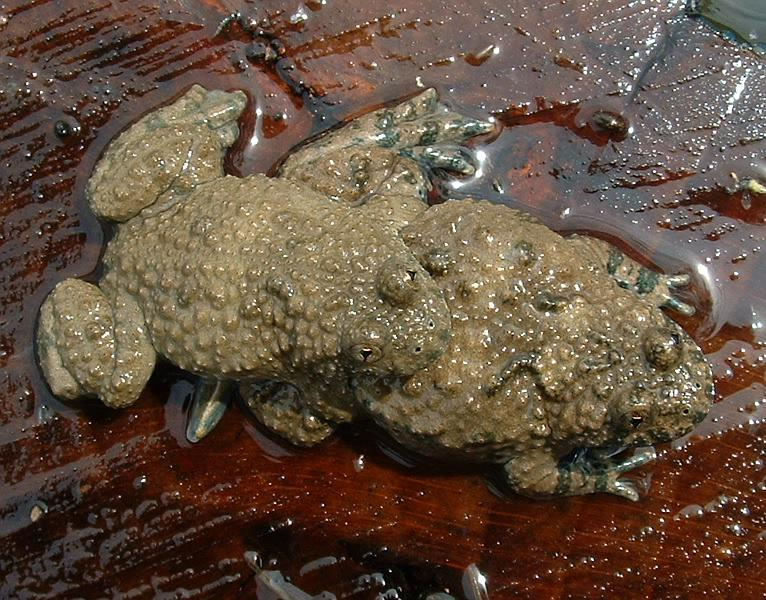
A pair of yellow-bellied toads in amplexus

The warts present on the dorsal side of the yellow-bellied toad allow for an opening of venom glands when threatened. The difference in coloration on the cryptic dorsal side and bright yellow ventral body allow for the yellow-bellied toad to remain camouflaged most of the time, only flashing its coloration under duress. Escape, full, and partial threat responses are the most commonly seen among yellow-bellied toads. The toad was also seen to puff up their chest, discouraging predators who prefer to capture and swallow their prey at once. Immobility is the most passive of responses, with the toad remaining still in an attempt to conceal itself as much as possible, avoiding confrontation entirely. While the toxin of the yellow-bellied toad is not fatal to humans, it can cause significant discomfort to most animals and is fatal to smaller ones.

The difference in what type of defense mechanism is used by yellow-bellied toads varies significantly among populations, even more so than species. The differences in predators among the populations is responsible for this difference. If one individual encounters snakes more often, it will employ the defense of puffing up more often than individuals that have never encountered a snake.

== Synonyms ==
- Rana variegata, Linnaeus, 1758
- Bombynator pachypus, Bonaparte 1838
