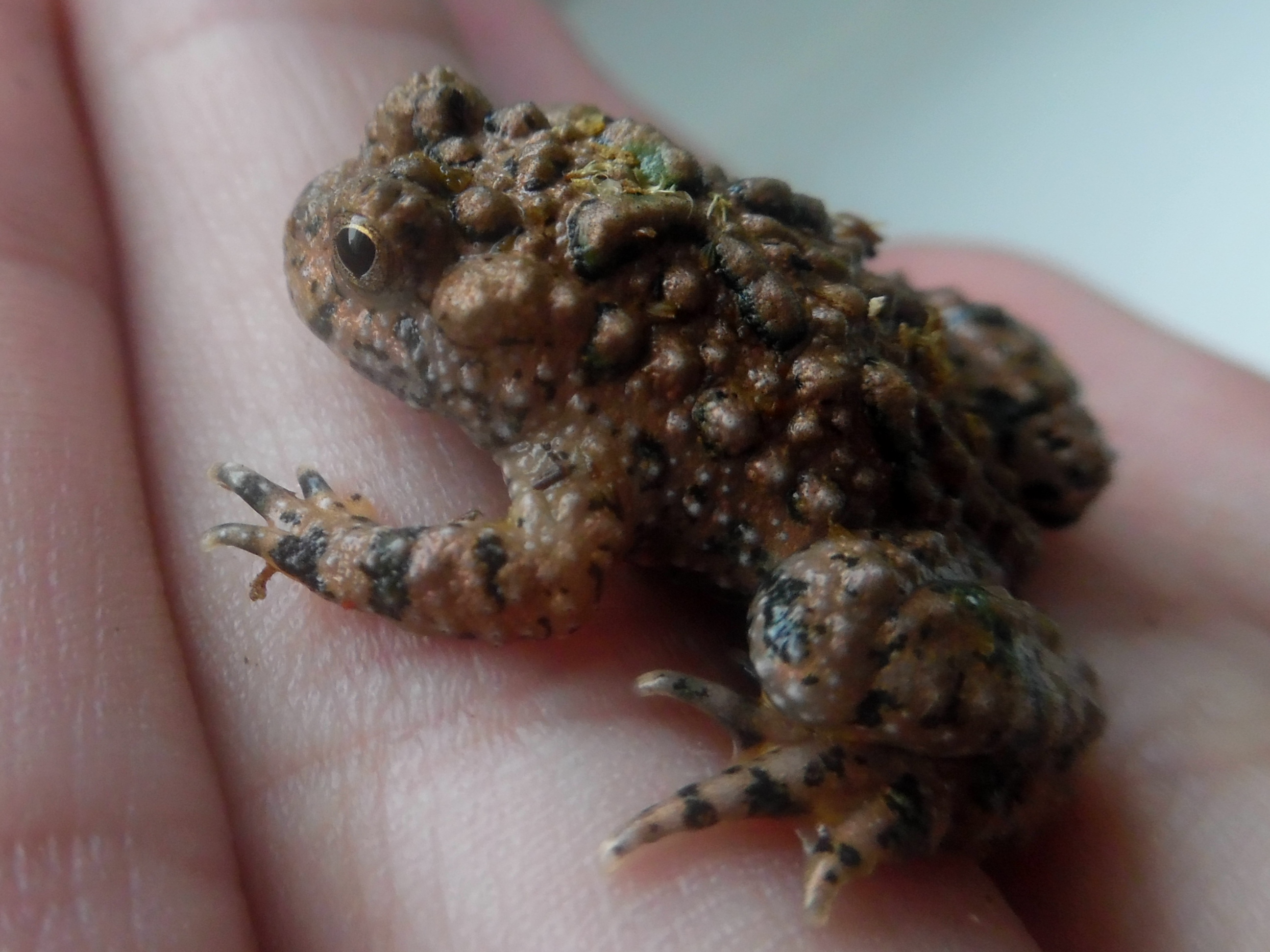

Conservation status
- Least Concern (IUCN 3.1)

Scientific classification
- Kingdom: Animalia
- Phylum: Chordata
- Class: Amphibia
- Order: Anura
- Family: Bombinatoridae
- Genus: Bombina
- Species: B. maxima

Binomial name
- Bombina maxima (Boulenger, 1905)

Synonyms
- List: Bombinator maximus Boulenger, 1905; Bombina maxima Stejneger, 1905; Bombina (Glandula) maxima Tian and Hu, 1985; Bombina (Grobina) maxima Dubois, 1987

= Bombina maxima =

Species of amphibian

Bombina maxima, commonly known as the Yunnan firebelly toad or large-webbed bell toad, is a species of toad in the family Bombinatoridae found in Yunnan, China and likely also in Myanmar. Its natural habitats include swamps, springs, marshes, arable land, canals, and ditches. Although easy to care for, handling a large-webbed toad should be kept to a minimum because their skin secretes a toxin that can cause irritation. This toxin is rich in active proteins and antimicrobial peptides that are essential in maintaining its innate immunity and protecting it from predators that come in contact with its skin. This antimicrobial peptide rich skin is used for local medicine.
