= Suiyang County =

Suiyang County 绥阳县
- County
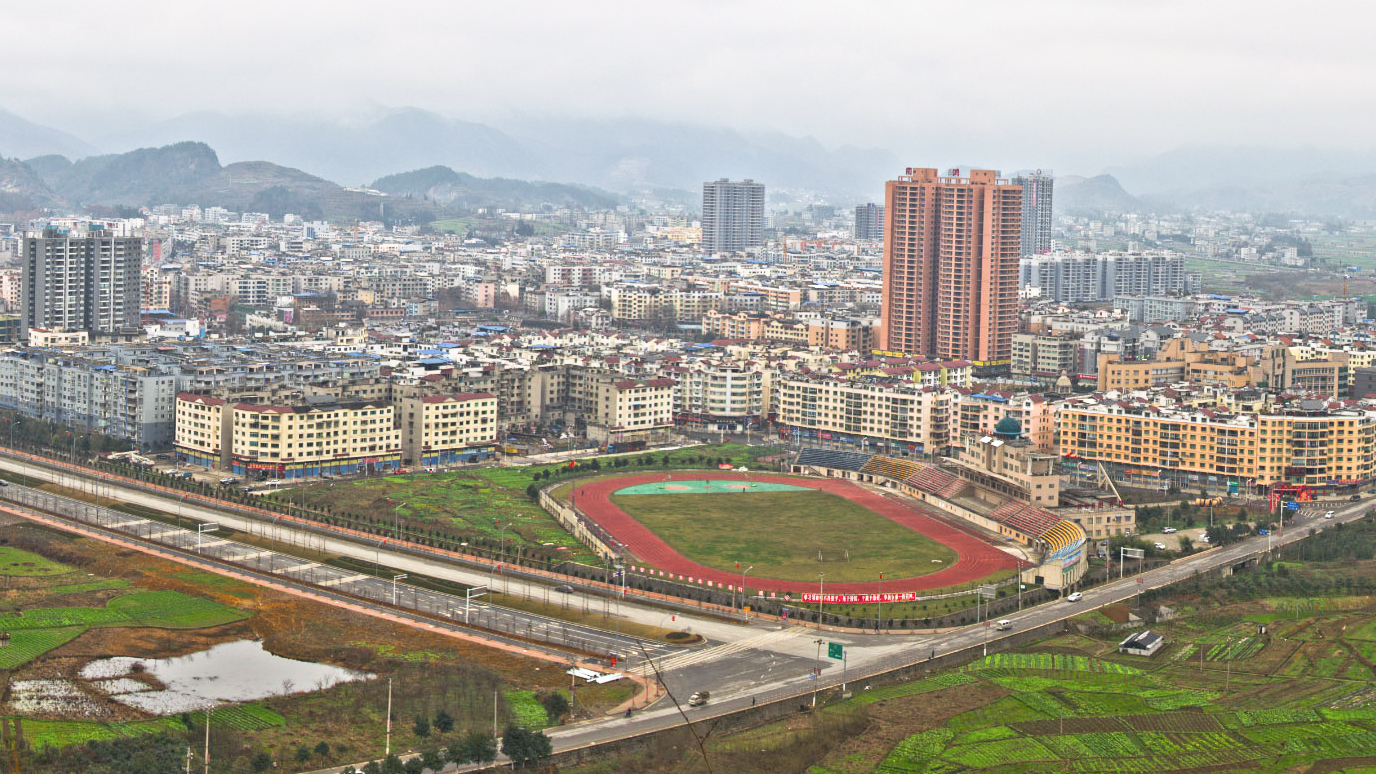

- Location of the seat in Guizhou Suiyang (Southwest China)
- Coordinates (Suiyang County government): 27°56′46″N 107°11′28″E
- Country: China
- Province: Guizhou
- Prefecture-level city: Zunyi
- County seat: Yangchuan

Area
  - Total: 2,566 km^{2} (991 sq mi)

Population (2017)
  - Total: 560,000
  - Density: 220/km^{2} (570/sq mi)
- Time zone: UTC+8 (China Standard)
- Website: www.suiyang.gov.cn

Suiyang County (simplified Chinese: 绥阳县; traditional Chinese: 綏陽縣; pinyin: Suíyáng Xiàn) is a county in Guizhou Province, China. It is under the jurisdiction of the prefecture-level city of Zunyi. It has an area of 2,566 square kilometers and a population of 560,000 as of 2017.

Suiyang leaf-litter toad, Leptobrachella suiyangensis, is only known from the Huoqiuba Nature Reserve in Suiyang County.

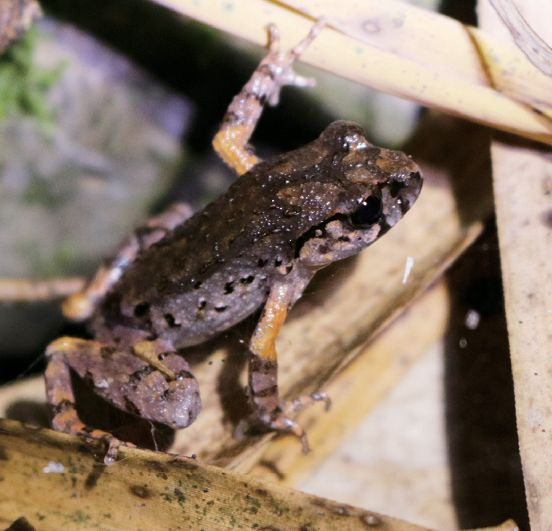
Suiyang has a frog named after it, Leptobrachella suiyangensis

== Administrative divisions ==
Suiyang County is divided into 1 subdistrict, 12 towns and 2 townships:

subdistrict

- Yangchuan 洋川街道

towns

- Zhengchang 郑场镇
- Wangcao 旺草镇
- Puchang 蒲场镇
- Fenghua 风华镇
- Maoya 茅垭镇
- Jianba 枧坝镇
- Kuankuo 宽阔镇
- Huangyang 黄杨镇
- Qinggangtang 青杠塘镇
- Taibai 太白镇
- Wenquan 温泉镇
- Pingle 坪乐镇

townships

- Dalucao 大路槽乡
- Xiaoguan 小关乡

== Climate ==
Climate data for Suiyang, elevation 889 m (2,917 ft), (1991–2020 normals)
Month	Jan	Feb	Mar	Apr	May	Jun	Jul	Aug	Sep	Oct	Nov	Dec	Year
Mean daily maximum °C (°F)	7.3 (45.1)	10.2 (50.4)	14.9 (58.8)	20.6 (69.1)	24.3 (75.7)	26.7 (80.1)	29.7 (85.5)	29.9 (85.8)	25.9 (78.6)	19.8 (67.6)	15.2 (59.4)	9.5 (49.1)	19.5 (67.1)
Daily mean °C (°F)	4.4 (39.9)	6.6 (43.9)	10.6 (51.1)	15.7 (60.3)	19.5 (67.1)	22.4 (72.3)	24.9 (76.8)	24.5 (76.1)	21.1 (70.0)	16.0 (60.8)	11.4 (52.5)	6.3 (43.3)	15.3 (59.5)
Mean daily minimum °C (°F)	2.4 (36.3)	4.3 (39.7)	7.7 (45.9)	12.4 (54.3)	16.1 (61.0)	19.5 (67.1)	21.6 (70.9)	20.9 (69.6)	17.9 (64.2)	13.6 (56.5)	8.9 (48.0)	4.1 (39.4)	12.5 (54.4)
Average precipitation mm (inches)	23.6 (0.93)	22.9 (0.90)	47.5 (1.87)	89.6 (3.53)	152.2 (5.99)	205.8 (8.10)	163.1 (6.42)	121.6 (4.79)	98.6 (3.88)	101.8 (4.01)	44.3 (1.74)	20.1 (0.79)	1,091.1 (42.95)
Average precipitation days (≥ 0.1 mm)	15.3	14.4	16.4	16.9	18.1	17.9	14.5	13.2	12.9	17.3	13.7	13.2	183.8
Average snowy days	4.6	2.5	0.6	0	0	0	0	0	0	0	0	1.8	9.5
Average relative humidity (%)	82	80	80	80	79	82	78	77	79	83	82	80	80
Mean monthly sunshine hours	26.0	34.0	55.3	79.4	92.9	83.7	151.1	167.9	109.7	58.6	55.4	37.3	951.3
Percentage possible sunshine	8	11	15	21	22	20	36	42	30	17	17	12	21
Source: China Meteorological Administration
