= List of amphibian genera =

List of amphibian genera lists the vertebrate class of amphibians by genus, spanning two superorders.

== Superorder Batrachia ==
=== Order Anura ===
Frogs

==== Suborder Archaeobatrachia ====
- Family Alytidae - sometimes called Discoglossidae
  - Genus Alytes - Midwife toad
  - Genus Discoglossus
  - Genus Latonia
- Family Ascaphidae
  - Genus Ascaphus - Tailed frog
- Family Bombinatoridae
  - Genus Barbourula
  - Genus Bombina - Fire-bellied toad
- Family Leiopelmatidae
  - Genus Leiopelma

==== Suborder Mesobatrachia ====
- Family Megophryidae
  - Genus Borneophrys
  - Genus Brachytarsophrys - Karin Hills frog
  - Genus Leptobrachella
  - Genus Leptobrachium - Eastern spadefoot toad
  - Genus Leptolalax
  - Genus Megophrys
  - Genus Ophryophryne
  - Genus Oreolalax
  - Genus Scutiger
- Family Pelobatidae
  - Genus Pelobates - European spadefoot toad
- Family Pelodytidae
  - Genus Pelodytes - Parsley frog
- Family Pipidae
  - Genus Hymenochirus - African dwarf frog
  - Genus Pipa
  - Genus Pseudhymenochirus - Merlin's dwarf gray frog
  - Genus Xenopus
- Family Rhinophrynidae
  - Genus Rhinophrynus
- Family Scaphiopodidae - American spadefoot toad
  - Genus Scaphiopus
  - Genus Spea

==== Suborder Neobatrachia ====
- Family Amphignathodontidae – sometimes in Hemiphractidae
  - Genus Flectonotus
  - Genus Gastrotheca
- Family Aromobatidae – sometimes in Dendrobatidae
  - Genus Allobates
  - Genus Anomaloglossus
  - Genus Aromobates
  - Genus Mannophryne
  - Genus Rheobates
- Family Arthroleptidae
  - Genus Arthroleptis
  - Genus Astylosternus
  - Genus Cardioglossa
  - Genus Leptodactylodon
  - Genus Leptopelis
  - Genus Nyctibates
  - Genus Scotobleps
  - Genus Trichobatrachus
- Family Brachycephalidae
  - Genus Brachycephalus - Saddleback toad
  - Genus Ischnocnema
- Family Bufonidae - True toad
  - Genus Adenomus
  - Genus Altiphrynoides
  - Genus Amazophrynella
  - Genus Amietophrynus - see Sclerophrys
  - Genus Anaxyrus
  - Genus Ansonia
  - Genus Atelopus
  - Genus Blythophryne
  - Genus Bufo
  - Genus Bufoides
  - Genus Capensibufo
  - Genus Churamiti
  - Genus Crepidophryne - see Incilius
  - Genus Dendrophryniscus
  - Genus Didynamipus - Four-digit toad
  - Genus Duttaphrynus
  - Genus Epidalea - Natterjack toad
  - Genus Frostius
  - Genus Incilius
  - Genus Ingerophrynus
  - Genus Laurentophryne - Parker's tree toad
  - Genus Leptophryne
  - Genus Melanophryniscus
  - Genus Mertensophryne
  - Genus Metaphryniscus
  - Genus Nectophryne
  - Genus Nectophrynoides
  - Genus Nimbaphrynoides
  - Genus Oreophrynella
  - Genus Osornophryne
  - Genus Parapelophryne
  - Genus Pedostibes
  - Genus Pelophryne
  - Genus Pseudepidalea
  - Genus Pseudobufo
  - Genus Rhinella
  - Genus Sabahphrynus
  - Genus Sclerophrys
  - Genus Schismaderma - African red toad
  - Genus Truebella
  - Genus Werneria
  - Genus Wolterstorffina
  - Genus Xanthophryne
- Family Calyptocephalellidae - sometimes in Bufonidae
  - Genus Calyptocephalella
  - Genus Telmatobufo
- Family Centrolenidae – Glass frog, including Allophrynidae
  - Genus Allophryne - Tukeit Hill frog
  - Genus Celsiella
  - Genus Centrolene
  - Genus Chimerella
  - Genus Cochranella
  - Genus Espadarana
  - Genus Hyalinobatrachium
  - Genus Ikakogi
  - Genus Nymphargus
  - Genus Rulyrana
  - Genus Sachatamia
  - Genus Teratohyla
  - Genus Vitreorana
- Family Ceratobatrachidae - often listed in Family Ranidae
  - Genus Alcalus
  - Genus Cornufer
  - Genus Liurana
  - Genus Platymantis
- Family Ceratophryidae
  - Genus Ceratophrys
  - Genus Chacophrys
  - Genus Lepidobatrachus
- Family Conrauidae - often listed in Family Ranidae
  - Genus Conraua
- Family Craugastoridae - formerly in Dendrobatidae
  - Genus Barycholos
  - Genus Bryophryne
  - Genus Ceuthomantis
  - Genus Craugastor
  - Genus Dischidodactylus
  - Genus Euparkerella
  - Genus Geobatrachus
  - Genus Haddadus
  - Genus Holoaden
  - Genus Hypodactylus
  - Genus Lynchius
  - Genus Niceforonia
  - Genus Noblella
  - Genus Oreobates
  - Genus Phrynopus
  - Genus Pristimantis
  - Genus Psychrophrynella
  - Genus Strabomantis
  - Genus Yunganastes
- Family Dendrobatidae - Poison dart frog
  - Genus Adelphobates
  - Genus Ameerega
  - Genus Andinobates
  - Genus Colostethus
  - Genus Dendrobates
  - Genus Epipedobates
  - Genus Excidobates
  - Genus Hyloxalus
  - Genus Minyobates
  - Genus Oophaga
  - Genus Phyllobates
  - Genus Ranitomeya
  - Genus Silverstoneia
- Family Dicroglossidae - often listed in Family Ranidae
  - Genus Allopaa
  - Genus Chrysopaa
  - Genus Euphlyctis
  - Genus Fejervarya
  - Genus Hoplobatrachus
  - Genus Ingerana
  - Genus Limnonectes
  - Genus Minervarya
  - Genus Nannophrys
  - Genus Nanorana -
  - Genus Occidozyga
  - Genus Ombrana
  - Genus Quasipaa
  - Genus Sphaerotheca
  - Genus Zakerana
- Family Eleutherodactylidae - formerly in Brachycephalidae
  - Genus Adelophryne
  - Genus Diasporus
  - Genus Eleutherodactylus
  - Genus Phyzelaphryne
- Family Heleophrynidae - Ghost frog
  - Genus Hadromophryne - Natal ghost frog
  - Genus Heleophryne
- Family Hemiphractidae
  - Genus Cryptobatrachus
  - Genus Flectonotus
  - Genus Fritziana
  - Genus Gastrotheca
  - Genus Hemiphractus
  - Genus Stefania
- Family Hemisotidae
  - Genus Hemisus - Shovelnose frog
- Family Hylidae – including Cryptobatrachidae, Hemiphractidae
  - Genus Acris – Cricket frog
  - Genus Agalychnis
  - Genus Anotheca – Spiny-headed tree frog
  - Genus Aparasphenodon
  - Genus Aplastodiscus – Canebrake tree frogs
  - Genus Argenteohyla
  - Genus Bokermannohyla
  - Genus Bromeliohyla
  - Genus Charadrahyla
  - Genus Corythomantis
  - Genus Cruziohyla
  - Genus Cyclorana
  - Genus Dendropsophus
  - Genus Duellmanohyla
  - Genus Ecnomiohyla
  - Genus Exerodonta
  - Genus Hyla
  - Genus Hylomantis
  - Genus Hyloscirtus
  - Genus Hypsiboas
  - Genus Isthmohyla
  - Genus Itapotihyla
  - Genus Litoria
  - Genus Lysapsus
  - Genus Megastomatohyla
  - Genus Myersiohyla
  - Genus Nyctimantis
  - Genus Nyctimystes
  - Genus Osteocephalus – Slender-legged tree frogs
  - Genus Osteopilus
  - Genus Pachymedusa – Mexican leaf frog
  - Genus Pelodryas
  - Genus Phasmahyla
  - Genus Phrynomedusa
  - Genus Phyllodytes
  - Genus Phyllomedusa
  - Genus Plectrohyla – Spikethumb frog
  - Genus Pseudacris – Chorus frog
  - Genus Pseudis
  - Genus Ptychohyla
  - Genus Scarthyla
  - Genus Scinax
  - Genus Smilisca – Mexican burrowing tree frog
  - Genus Sphaenorhynchus
  - Genus Tepuihyla
  - Genus Tlalocohyla
  - Genus Trachycephalus
  - Genus Triprion
  - Genus Xenohyla
- Family Hylodidae
  - Genus Crossodactylus
  - Genus Hylodes
  - Genus Megaelosia
- Family Hyperoliidae
  - Genus Acanthixalus
  - Genus Afrixalus
  - Genus Alexteroon
  - Genus Arlequinus
  - Genus Callixalus
  - Genus Chlorolius
  - Genus Chrysobatrachus
  - Genus Cryptothylax
  - Genus Heterixalus
  - Genus Hyperolius
  - Genus Kassina
  - Genus Kassinula
  - Genus Morerella
  - Genus Opisthothylax
  - Genus Paracassina
  - Genus Phlyctimantis
  - Genus Semnodactylus - Weale's running frog
  - Genus Tachycnemis - Seychelles treefrog
- Family Leiuperidae - sometimes in Leptodactylidae
  - Genus Edalorhina
  - Genus Engystomops
  - Genus Physalaemus
  - Genus Pleurodema
  - Genus Pseudopaludicola
- Family Leptodactylidae – including Cycloramphidae
  - Genus Adenomera
  - Genus Crossodactylodes
  - Genus Edalorhina - see Family Leiuperidae
  - Genus Engystomops - see Family Leiuperidae
  - Genus Hydrolaetare
  - Genus Leptodactylus
  - Genus Lithodytes
  - Genus Paratelmatobius
  - Genus Physalaemus - see Family Leiuperidae
  - Genus Pleurodem - see Family Leiuperidae
  - Genus Pseudopaludicola - see Family Leiuperidae
  - Genus Rupirana
  - Genus Scythrophrys
- Family Mantellidae
  - Genus Aglyptodactylus
  - Genus Blommersia
  - Genus Boehmantis
  - Genus Boophis
  - Genus Gephyromantis
  - Genus Guibemantis
  - Genus Laliostoma
  - Genus Mantella
  - Genus Mantidactylus
  - Genus Spinomantis
  - Genus Tsingymantis
  - Genus Wakea
- Family Microhylidae – including Brevicipitidae
  - Genus Adelastes
  - Genus Anodonthyla
  - Genus Aphantophryne
  - Genus Arcovomer
  - Genus Asterophrys
  - Genus Austrochaperina
  - Genus Barygenys
  - Genus Callulops
  - Genus Chaperina
  - Genus Chiasmocleis
  - Genus Choerophryne
  - Genus Cophixalus
  - Genus Cophyla
  - Genus Copiula
  - Genus Ctenophryne
  - Genus Dasypops
  - Genus Dermatonotus
  - Genus Dyscophus
  - Genus Elachistocleis
  - Genus Gastrophryne
  - Genus Gastrophrynoides
  - Genus Genyophryne
  - Genus Glyphoglossus
  - Genus Hamptophryne
  - Genus Hoplophryne
  - Genus Hylophorbus
  - Genus Hypopachus
  - Genus Kalophrynus
  - Genus Kaloula
  - Genus Liophryne
  - Genus Madecassophryne
  - Genus Mantophryne
  - Genus Melanobatrachus
  - Genus Metamagnusia
  - Genus Metaphrynella
  - Genus Microhyla
  - Genus Micryletta
  - Genus Mini
  - Genus Myersiella
  - Genus Mysticellus - Franky's narrow-mouthed frog
  - Genus Oninia
  - Genus Oreophryne
  - Genus Otophryne
  - Genus Oxydactyla
  - Genus Paedophryne
  - Genus Paradoxophyla
  - Genus Parhoplophryne
  - Genus Phrynella
  - Genus Phrynomantis
  - Genus Plethodontohyla
  - Genus Pseudocallulops
  - Genus Rhombophryne
  - Genus Scaphiophryne
  - Genus Sphenophryne
  - Genus Stereocyclops
  - Genus Stumpffia
  - Genus Synapturanus
  - Genus Uperodon
  - Genus Vietnamophryne
  - Genus Xenorhina
- Family Myobatrachidae - including Limnodynastidae, Rheobatrachidae
  - Genus Adelotus - Tusked frog
  - Genus Arenophryne
  - Genus Assa
  - Genus Crinia
  - Genus Geocrinia
  - Genus Heleioporus
  - Genus Lechriodus
  - Genus Limnodynastes
  - Genus Metacrinia
  - Genus Mixophyes - Barred frogs
  - Genus Myobatrachus
  - Genus Neobatrachus
  - Genus Notaden
  - Genus Opisthodon
  - Genus Paracrinia - Haswell's frog
  - Genus Philoria
  - Genus Pseudophryne
  - Genus Rheobatrachus - Gastric-brooding frog
  - Genus Spicospina
  - Genus Taudactylus
  - Genus Uperoleia
- Family Nasikabatrachidae - often listed in Family Sooglossidae
  - Genus Nasikabatrachus
- Family Nyctibatrachidae - often listed in Family Ranidae
  - Genus Astrobatrachus
  - Genus Lankanectes
  - Genus Nyctibatrachus
- Family Petropedetidae - often listed in Family Ranidae
  - Genus Arthroleptides
  - Genus Ericabatrachus
  - Genus Petropedetes
- Family Phrynobatrachidae - often listed in Family Ranidae
  - Genus Phrynobatrachus
- Family Pseudidae
  - Genus Pseudis - see Family Hylidae
- Family Ptychadenidae - often listed in Family Ranidae
  - Genus Hildebrandtia
  - Genus Lanzarana
  - Genus Ptychadena
- Family Pyxicephalidae - often listed in Family Ranidae
  - Genus Amietia
  - Genus Anhydrophryne
  - Genus Arthroleptella
  - Genus Aubria
  - Genus Cacosternum
  - Genus Microbatrachella - Micro frog
  - Genus Natalobatrachus - Natal diving frog
  - Genus Nothophryne
  - Genus Poyntonia
  - Genus Pyxicephalus
  - Genus Strongylopus
  - Genus Tomopterna
- Family Ranidae – True frog, including Ceratobatrachidae, Dicroglossidae, Micrixalidae, Nyctibatrachidae, Petropedetidae, Phrynobatrachidae, Ptychadenidae, Pyxicephalidae
  - Genus Afrana
  - Genus Allopaa - see Family Dicroglossidae
  - Genus Amietia - see Famlily Pyxicephalidae
  - Genus Amolops
  - Genus Anhydrophryne - see Famlily Pyxicephalidae
  - Genus Arthroleptella - see Famlily Pyxicephalidae
  - Genus Arthroleptides - see Famlily Petropedetidae
  - Genus Aubria - see Famlily Pyxicephalidae
  - Genus Babina - sometimes included in Rana
  - Genus Batrachylodes
  - Genus Cacosternum - see Famlily Petropedetidae
  - Genus Ceratobatrachus - see Family Ceratobatrachidae
  - Genus Chaparana - see Family Dicroglossidae
  - Genus Chrysopaa - see Family Dicroglossidae
  - Genus Clinotarsus - formerly in Rana, includes Nasirana
  - Genus Conraua - see Family Conrauidae
  - Genus Dimorphognathus - see Phrynobatrachus
  - Genus Ericabatrachus - see Famlily Petropedetidae
  - Genus Euphlyctis - see Family Dicroglossidae
  - Genus Fejervarya - see Family Dicroglossidae, formerly in Rana, paraphyletic
  - Genus Glandirana - formerly in Rana
  - Genus Hildebrandtia
  - Genus Hoplobatrachus - see Family Dicroglossidae
  - Genus Huia - polyphyletic
  - Genus Hylarana - formerly in Rana
  - Genus Humerana
  - Genus Indirana
  - Genus Ingerana - see Family Dicroglossidae
  - Genus Lankanectes - see Family Nyctibatrachidae
  - Genus Lanzarana - see Family Ptychadenidae
  - Genus Limnonectes - see Family Dicroglossidae
  - Genus Lithobates - formerly in Rana
  - Genus Meristogenys - might belong in Huia
  - Genus Micrixalus
  - Genus Microbatrachella - see Family Pyxicephalidae
  - Genus Minervarya - see Family Dicroglossidae
  - Genus Nannophrys - see Family Dicroglossidae
  - Genus Nanorana - see Family Dicroglossidae
  - Genus Natalobatrachus - see Family Pyxicephalidae
  - Genus Nothophryne - see Family Pyxicephalidae
  - Genus Nyctibatrachus - see Family Nyctibatrachidae
  - Genus Occidozyga - see Family Dicroglossidae
  - Genus Odorrana - formerly in Rana
  - Genus Paa - see Family Dicroglossidae
  - Genus Palmatorappia - see Family Ceratobatrachidae genus Cornufer
  - Genus Pelophylax - formerly in Rana, probably paraphyletic
  - Genus Petropedetes - see Family Petropedetidae
  - Genus Phrynobatrachus - see Family Phrynobatrachidae
  - Genus Phrynodon - see Family Phrynobatrachidae
  - Genus Platymantis - see Family Ceratobatrachidae
  - Genus Pseudoamolops - see Rana
  - Genus Poyntonia - see Family Pyxicephalidae
  - Genus Pterorana - Indian flying frog
  - Genus Ptychadena - see Family Ptychadenidae
  - Genus Pyxicephalus - see Famlily Pyxicephalidae
  - Genus Rana
  - Genus Sanguirana - formerly in Rana
  - Genus Sphaerotheca - see Family Dicroglossidae
  - Genus Staurois
  - Genus Strongylopus - see Famlily Pyxicephalidae
  - Genus Tomopterna - see Famlily Pyxicephalidae
- Family Ranixalidae - sometimes in Ranidae
  - Genus Indirana
- Family Rhacophoridae
  - Genus Beddomixalus
  - Genus Buergeria
  - Genus Chiromantis
  - Genus Feihyla
  - Genus Ghatixalus
  - Genus Gracixalus
  - Genus Kurixalus
  - Genus Liuixalus
  - Genus Mercurana
  - Genus Nasutixalus
  - Genus Nyctixalus
  - Genus Philautus
  - Genus Polypedates
  - Genus Pseudophilautus
  - Genus Raorchestes
  - Genus Rhacophorus
  - Genus Taruga
  - Genus Theloderma
- Family Rhinodermatidae – sometimes in Cycloramphidae
  - Genus Rhinoderma
- Family Sooglossidae
  - Genus Sechellophryne
  - Genus Sooglossus
- Family Strabomantidae - some formerly in Brachycephalidae, all listed in Craugastoridae
  - Genus Atopophrynus
  - Genus Barycholos
  - Genus Bryophryne
  - Genus Dischidodactylus
  - Genus Euparkerella
  - Genus Geobatrachus
  - Genus Holoaden
  - Genus Hypodactylus
  - Genus Lynchius
  - Genus Niceforonia
  - Genus Noblella
  - Genus Oreobates
  - Genus Phrynopus
  - Genus Pristimantis
  - Genus Psychrophrynella
  - Genus Strabomantis

=== Order Urodela ===
Salamanders

==== Suborder Cryptobranchoidea ====
- Family Cryptobranchidae - Giant salamander
  - Genus Andrias
  - Genus Cryptobranchus - Hellbender
- Family Hynobiidae - Asiatic salamander
  - Genus Batrachuperus
  - Genus Hynobius
  - Genus Liua
  - Genus Onychodactylus
  - Genus Pachyhynobius
  - Genus Paradactylodon
  - Genus Pseudohynobius
  - Genus Protohynobius - Puxiong salamander
  - Genus Ranodon
  - Genus Salamandrella

==== Suborder Salamandroidea ====
- Family Ambystomatidae
  - Genus Ambystoma - Mole salamander
- Family Amphiumidae
  - Genus Amphiuma
- Family Dicamptodontidae
  - Genus Dicamptodon - Pacific giant salamander
- Family Plethodontidae
  - Genus Aneides - Climbing salamander
  - Genus Atylodes - Brown cave salamander
  - Genus Batrachoseps - Slender salamander
  - Genus Bolitoglossa
  - Genus Bradytriton
  - Genus Chiropterotriton
  - Genus Cryptotriton
  - Genus Dendrotriton
  - Genus Desmognathus
  - Genus Ensatina
  - Genus Eurycea - Brook salamander
  - Genus Gyrinophilus
  - Genus Hemidactylium - Four-toed salamander
  - Genus Hydromantes
  - Genus Karsenia - Korean crevice salamander
  - Genus Nototriton
  - Genus Nyctanolis
  - Genus Oedipina
  - Genus Parvimolge
  - Genus Phaeognathus - Red Hills salamander
  - Genus Plethodon - Woodland salamander
  - Genus Pseudoeurycea
  - Genus Pseudotriton
  - Genus Speleomantes
  - Genus Stereochilus - Many-lined salamander
  - Genus Thorius
  - Genus Urspelerpes
- Family Proteidae
  - Genus Necturus
  - Genus Proteus - Olm
- Family Rhyacotritonidae
  - Genus Rhyacotriton - Torrent salamander
- Family Salamandridae
  - Genus Calotriton
  - Genus Chioglossa - Gold-striped salamander
  - Genus Cynops - Fire belly newts
  - Genus Echinotriton
  - Genus Euproctus
  - Genus Ichthyosaura - Alpine newt
  - Genus Lissotriton
  - Genus Lyciasalamandra
  - Genus Mertensiella - Caucasian salamander
  - Genus Neurergus
  - Genus Notophthalmus
  - Genus Ommatotriton
  - Genus Pachytriton
  - Genus Paramesotriton
  - Genus Pleurodeles
  - Genus Salamandra
  - Genus Salamandrina
  - Genus Taricha
  - Genus Triturus
  - Genus Tylototriton
- Family Sirenidae
  - Genus Pseudobranchus - Dwarf siren
  - Genus Siren

== Superorder Gymnophiona ==
=== Order Apoda ===
Caecilians

- Family Caeciliidae
  - Genus Boulengerula - see Family Herpelidae
  - Genus Brasilotyphlus - see Family Siphonopidae
  - Genus Caecilia
  - Genus Dermophis - see Family Dermophiidae
  - Genus Gegeneophis - see Family Indotyphlidae
  - Genus Geotrypetes - see Family Dermophiidae
  - Genus Grandisonia
  - Genus Gymnopis - see Family Dermophiidae
  - Genus Herpele - see Family Herpelidae
  - Genus Hypogeophis - see Family Indotyphlidae
  - Genus Idiocranium - see Family Indotyphlidae
  - Genus Indotyphlus - see Family Indotyphlidae
  - Genus Luetkenotyphlus - see Family Siphonopidae
  - Genus Microcaecilia
  - Genus Mimosiphonops - see Family Siphonopidae
  - Genus Oscaecilia
  - Genus Parvicaecilia
  - Genus Praslinia - see Family Indotyphlidae
  - Genus Schistometopum - see Family Dermophiidae
  - Genus Siphonops - see Family Siphonopidae
- Family Chikilidae
  - Genus Chikila
- Family Dermophiidae
  - Genus Dermophis
  - Genus Geotrypetes
  - Genus Gymnopis
  - Genus Schistometopum
- Family Herpelidae
  - Genus Boulengerula
  - Genus Herpele
- Family Ichthyophiidae
  - Genus Caudacaecilia
  - Genus Ichthyophis
  - Genus Uraeotyphlus
- Family Indotyphlidae
  - Genus Gegeneophis
  - Genus Grandisonia - see Family Caeciliidae
  - Genus Hypogeophis
  - Genus Idiocranium - Makumuno Assumbo caecilian
  - Genus Indotyphlus
  - Genus Praslinia - Praslin's caecilian
  - Genus Sylvacaecilia
- Family Rhinatrematidae
  - Genus Epicrionops
  - Genus Rhinatrema
- Family Scolecomorphidae
  - Genus Crotaphatrema
  - Genus Scolecomorphus
- Family Siphonopidae
  - Genus Brasilotyphlus
  - Genus Caecilita - see Microcaecilia
  - Genus Luetkenotyphlus
  - Genus Microcaecilia
  - Genus Mimosiphonops
  - Genus Parvicaecilia - see Family Caeciliidae
  - Genus Siphonops
- Family Typhlonectidae
  - Genus Atretochoana
  - Genus Chthonerpeton
  - Genus Nectocaecilia
  - Genus Potamotyphlus
  - Genus Typhlonectes

== See also ==
- Amphibian
- Herping
