= Acanthixalus sonjae =

Conservation status
- Vulnerable (IUCN 3.1)

Scientific classification
- Kingdom: Animalia
- Phylum: Chordata
- Class: Amphibia
- Order: Anura
- Family: Hyperoliidae
- Genus: Acanthixalus
- Species: A. sonjae

Binomial name
- Acanthixalus sonjae Rödel, Kosuch, Veith, and Ernst, 2003
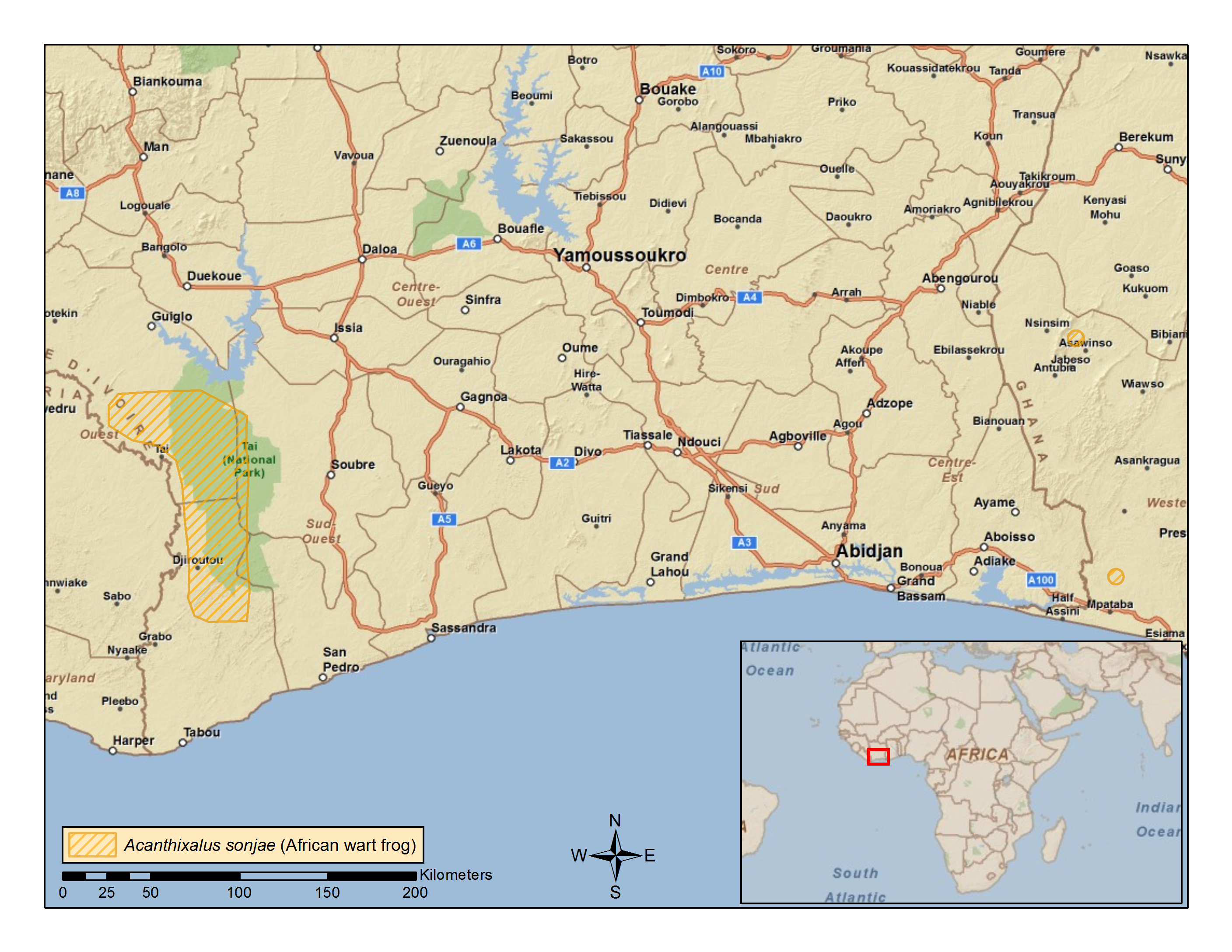

Species of amphibian

Acanthixalus sonjae (common name: Ivory Coast wart frog, or African wart frog) is a species of frog in the family Hyperoliidae. It is found in south-western Ivory Coast (including Taï National Park, its type locality) and in south-western Ghana, and possibly in adjacent Liberia.

== Etymology ==
The specific name sonjae honors Sonja Wolters, the person who caught the first specimen of this species and triggered interest on fauna of larger water-filled tree holes.

== Description ==
Males measure 33–38 mm (1.3–1.5 in) and females 36–39 mm (1.4–1.5 in) in snout–vent length. The body is flattened and the snout is long and pointed. The eyes are protruding with rhomboid pupils. Both the hands and feet are webbed, and the finger and toe tips are enlarged to discs. The back and extremities are clear yellow green in the ground color, broken by numerous black spots and lines and three larger black cross bands. Females can change their color from green to almost black within minutes. Juveniles are more brightly colored, often yellow to orange.

Males appear to be mute. They have a pair of subgular glands and hook-like tarsal spines. The discs are larger in males than in females.

== Reproduction ==
The species uses large tree holes for breeding (diameter about 40 cm (16 in)); it has not been found in small tree holes (less than about one liter in volume) occupied by Phrynobatrachus guineensis. It appears to be mute. The egg clutches are attached to the walls or ceiling of the cavity, and hatch into larvae after about 11 to 14 days. The duration of the larval period is relatively long, at least three months.

== Habitat and conservation ==
Its natural habitat is primary and secondary lowland wet evergreen forest and moist semi-deciduous forest. It uses very large tree holes for breeding, a factor that may restrict its distribution. It is an uncommon species threatened by deforestation caused by agricultural development, timber extraction and human settlement. It occurs in a number of protected areas, including the Taï National Park and the Ankasa Conservation Area.
