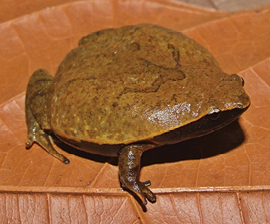
- S. histrio

Scientific classification
- Kingdom: Animalia
- Phylum: Chordata
- Class: Amphibia
- Order: Anura
- Family: Microhylidae
- Subfamily: Gastrophryninae
- Genus: Stereocyclops; Cope, 1870

Type species
- Stereocyclops incrassatus Cope, 1870 "1869"

Species
- 4, see text.

Synonyms
- Emydops Miranda-Ribeiro, 1920; Ribeirina Parker, 1934; Hyophryne Carvalho, 1954

= Stereocyclops =

Genus of amphibians

Stereocyclops (common name: Brazilian dumpy frogs) is a small genus of microhylid frogs. It is endemic to the Atlantic forest of eastern Brazil. Molecular phylogeny suggests that it is sister taxon to the clade containing Dasypops and Myersiella.

== Description ==
Stereocyclops can be defined by features of its osteology. In the skull, palatine bone is present, as is the posterior part of prevomer. The clavicle is fully developed and long. Furthermore, the dorsal coloration is light and sharply separated from the dark ventrum by a light line. The head is flattened and the mouth is relatively large. Notice, however, that at the time of this description, the genus was monotypic and Hyophryne was considered a separate genus; a thorough morphological study of the genus as presently understood is lacking.

== Beheavior ==
One species, Stereocyclops parkeri, is known to show defensive behavior that may enhance its cryptic appearance, giving an impression of a casually dislodged leaf: when an individual is disturbed, it makes a short leap, landing with its legs stretched backwards. It will then remain still, sometimes as long as 30 minutes, although it may also move a little forward with a quick movement of the feet, resembling a flicked leaf.

== Species ==
There are four species in the genus:

Species	Common name	Image
Stereocyclops histrio (Carvalho, 1954)	Bahia yellow frog	
Stereocyclops incrassatus Cope, 1870	Brazilian dumpy frog	
Stereocyclops palmipes Caramaschi, Salles, and Cruz, 2012		
Stereocyclops parkeri (Wettstein, 1934)		
