= Paracassina obscura =

Conservation status
- Least Concern (IUCN 3.1)

Scientific classification
- Kingdom: Animalia
- Phylum: Chordata
- Class: Amphibia
- Order: Anura
- Family: Hyperoliidae
- Genus: Paracassina
- Species: P. obscura

Binomial name
- Paracassina obscura (Boulenger, 1895)

Synonyms
- Kassina obscura (Boulenger, 1895); Tornierella obscura (Boulenger, 1895)

Species of frog

Paracassina obscura (common names: Ethiopia striped frog, Boulenger's mountain kassina) is a species of frog in the family Hyperoliidae. It is endemic to Ethiopian highlands west of the Rift Valley. Its natural habitats are montane grasslands, less commonly forest margins. It is also known from a few clearings in tropical deciduous forest, rural gardens, and urban areas. It could be threatened by habitat loss.
