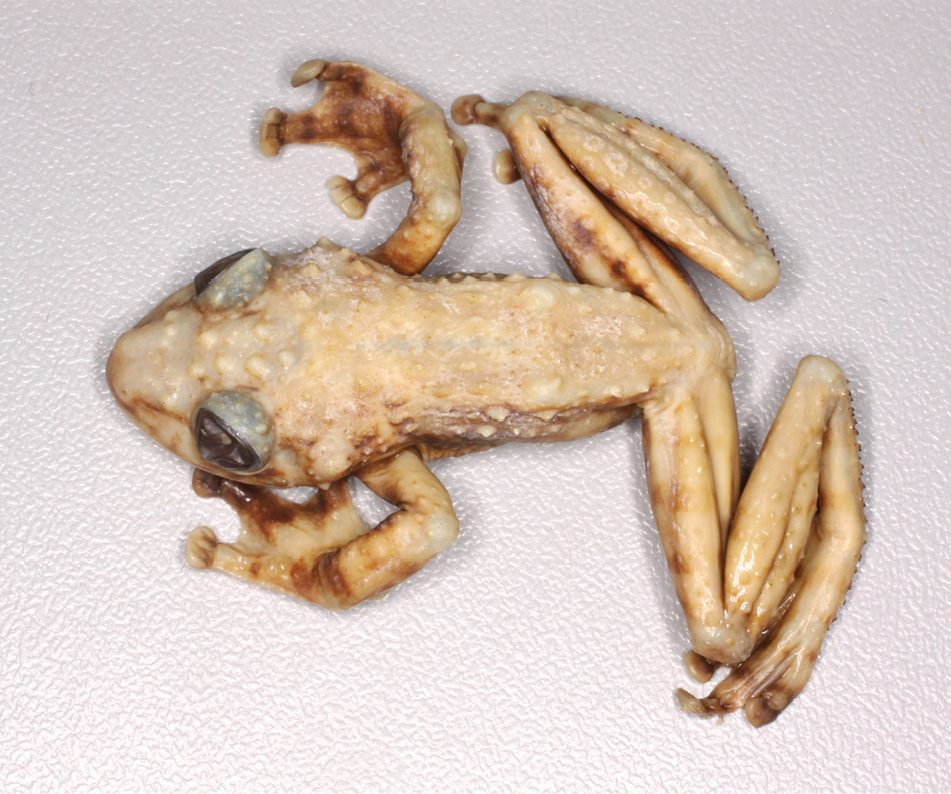

Conservation status
- Least Concern (IUCN 3.1)

Scientific classification
- Kingdom: Animalia
- Phylum: Chordata
- Class: Amphibia
- Order: Anura
- Family: Hyperoliidae
- Genus: Acanthixalus
- Species: A. spinosus

Binomial name
- Acanthixalus spinosus (Buchholz and Peters, 1875)

Synonyms
- Hyperolius spinosus Buchholz and Peters, 1875

= Acanthixalus spinosus =

Species of frog

Acanthixalus spinosus, commonly known as the African wart frog, is a species of frog in the family Hyperoliidae, the sedge and bush frogs. It is native to Africa, where it can be found from south-eastern Nigeria to Gabon and the Democratic Republic of the Congo.

== Description ==
Males measure 30–38 mm (1.2–1.5 in) and females 32–36 mm (1.3–1.4 in) in snout–vent length. The dorsum is warty, black or brownish to olive in color, and bears an hourglass pattern consisting of very irregular transverse bands on dorsum and limbs. Males have no vocal sac or vocal sac openings and are believed to be mute. Males also have strong spines on the tarsus, and they have larger digital discs than females.

The tadpoles grow to 60 mm (2.4 in) in total length. Newly metamorphosed juveniles are brightly colored: they are dorsally orange, with the top of the head and bars across the middle of the back and in the lumbar region deep maroon.

== Habitat and conservation ==
This frog lives in lowland rainforest. It is mostly aquatic, living in water-filled holes in trees. Apparently, they leave the tree holes only during night to forage. The eggs are deposited a few centimeters above the water surface. Upon hatching, the tadpoles fall into the water. The development takes approximately three months. They are detritivores.

Because this species depends on large trees with holes that collect rainwater, it is vulnerable to ongoing forest loss.

== Ecological interactions ==
This frog is host to the commensal protists Opalina proteus and Cepedea couillardi.
