= Cryptothylax greshoffii =

Conservation status
- Least Concern (IUCN 3.1)

Scientific classification
- Kingdom: Animalia
- Phylum: Chordata
- Class: Amphibia
- Order: Anura
- Family: Hyperoliidae
- Genus: Cryptothylax
- Species: C. greshoffii

Binomial name
- Cryptothylax greshoffii (Schilthuis, 1899)

Species of amphibian

Cryptothylax greshoffii is a species of frogs in the family Hyperoliidae. It is found in Angola, Cameroon, the Central African Republic, the Democratic Republic of the Congo, Equatorial Guinea, Gabon, and possibly Republic of the Congo. Its natural habitats are subtropical or tropical moist lowland forests, subtropical or tropical moist shrubland, rivers, swamps, freshwater lakes, freshwater marshes, intermittent freshwater marshes, rural gardens, heavily degraded former forests, and aquaculture ponds. Cryptothylax greshoffii and "Hyperolius" robustus have a phylogenetic relatationship
