= Paracassina kounhiensis =

Conservation status
- Vulnerable (IUCN 3.1)

Scientific classification
- Kingdom: Animalia
- Phylum: Chordata
- Class: Amphibia
- Order: Anura
- Family: Hyperoliidae
- Genus: Paracassina
- Species: P. kounhiensis

Binomial name
- Paracassina kounhiensis (Mocquard, 1905)

Synonyms
- Tornierella pulchra Ahl, 1924; Kassina kounhiensis (Mocquard, 1905); Tornierella kounhiensis (Mocquard, 1905)

Species of frog

Paracassina kounhiensis (common names: Kouni Valley striped frog, Mocquard's mountain kassina) is a species of frog in the family Hyperoliidae. It is endemic to Ethiopian highlands east of the Rift Valley. Its natural habitats is montane grassland, less commonly the margins of montane forest. It breeds in marshes and pools. While still locally abundant, it is threatened by habitat loss. A part of its range is within the Bale Mountains National Park.
