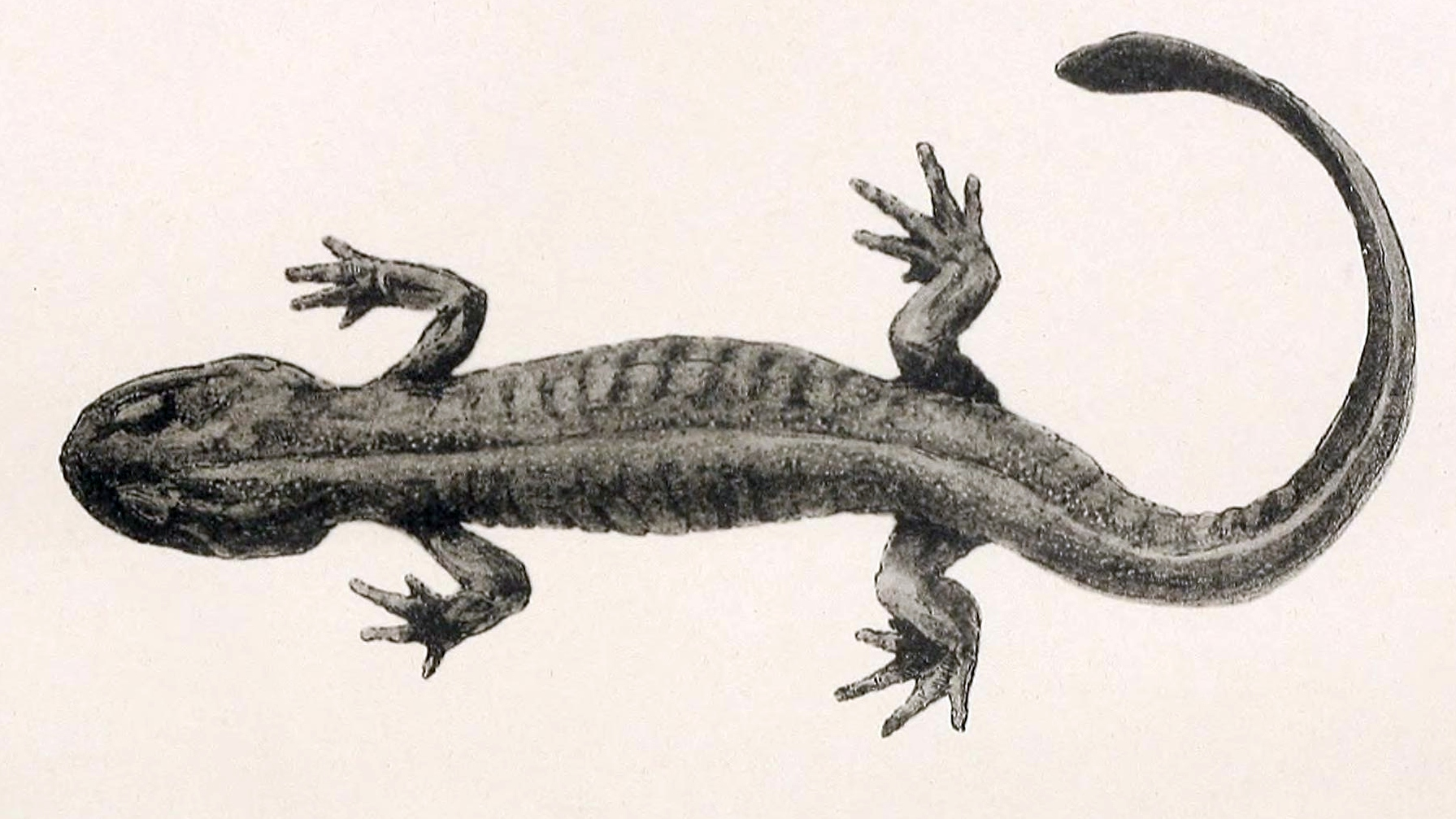

Conservation status
- Endangered (IUCN 3.1)

Scientific classification
- Kingdom: Animalia
- Phylum: Chordata
- Class: Amphibia
- Order: Urodela
- Family: Hynobiidae
- Subfamily: Hynobiinae
- Genus: Ranodon; Kessler, 1866
- Species: R. sibiricus

Binomial name
- Ranodon sibiricus Kessler, 1866

= Ranodon =

Genus of salamanders

Ranodon is a monotypic genus of salamanders in the family Hynobiidae. It currently contains only one species, the Central Asian salamander (Ranodon sibiricus). The species lives in streams and has reduced lungs. It was previously assumed the fertilization was the opposite of that other salamanders with external fertilization, with the male first depositing a large mass of sperm, which the female then placed her eggs on. But this appears to have been an error, and that the male fertilize the eggs only after the female has laid them.

Formerly in this genus were:

- Wushan salamander (Liua shihi)
- Tsinpa salamander (Liua tsinpaensis)
- Yellow-spotted salamander (Pseudohynobius flavomaculatus)

== Distribution ==
The Central Asian salamander is found in the Dzungarian Alatau mountains on the border of China and Kazakhstan. Its natural habitat is temperate forest, tundra, temperate grassland, rivers, and freshwater marshes, and springs. The species is threatened by habitat loss.
