= Hyperolius fasciatus =

Conservation status
- Data Deficient (IUCN 3.1)

Scientific classification
- Kingdom: Animalia
- Phylum: Chordata
- Class: Amphibia
- Order: Anura
- Family: Hyperoliidae
- Genus: Hyperolius
- Species: H. fasciatus

Binomial name
- Hyperolius fasciatus (Ferreira, 1906)

Species of frog

Hyperolius fasciatus is a species of frog in the family Hyperoliidae.

== Location ==
It is endemic to Angola. Its natural habitats are rivers, freshwater marshes, and intermittent freshwater marshes. It is recorded that it breeds in waterbodies and has a larval development breeding strategy.
