= Cryptothylax minutus =

Conservation status
- Data Deficient (IUCN 3.1)

Scientific classification
- Kingdom: Animalia
- Phylum: Chordata
- Class: Amphibia
- Order: Anura
- Family: Hyperoliidae
- Genus: Cryptothylax
- Species: C. minutus

Binomial name
- Cryptothylax minutus Laurent, 1976

Species of amphibian

Cryptothylax minutus is a species of frogs in the family Hyperoliidae found in the Democratic Republic of the Congo and possibly the Republic of the Congo. Its natural habitats are subtropical or tropical moist lowland forests, rivers, swamps, freshwater lakes, freshwater marshes, intermittent freshwater marshes, rural gardens, and heavily degraded former forests.
