= Hyperolius koehleri =

Conservation status
- Least Concern (IUCN 3.1)

Scientific classification
- Kingdom: Animalia
- Phylum: Chordata
- Class: Amphibia
- Order: Anura
- Family: Hyperoliidae
- Genus: Hyperolius
- Species: H. koehleri

Binomial name
- Hyperolius koehleri Mertens, 1940

Synonyms
- Chlorolius koehleri (Mertens, 1940)

Species of frog

Hyperolius koehleri is a species of frog in the family Hyperoliidae. It is known from southeastern Nigeria, southern Cameroon, and northern Gabon. It is likely to also be found in Equatorial Guinea and the adjacent Republic of the Congo. Common name Koehler's green frog has been coined for it.

== Taxonomy and systematics ==
Hyperolius koehleri was described by Robert Mertens in 1940, based on material collected from Musake springs, above Buea, on Mount Cameroon. In 1988 Perret placed it in its own genus, which he named Chlorolius in view of its "chlorophyll color". He cited both its breeding habits (low, chirping male call and breeding in pure, well-oxygenated waters) and morphology (e.g., numerous black spines on flanks, underside of limbs and feet of breeding males) as diagnostic characteristics for the new genus. However, molecular data clearly show that this species is embedded within Hyperolius.

== Description ==
Hyperolius koehleri measure 26–29 mm (1.0–1.1 in) in snout–vent length, with the range 26–27 mm (1.0–1.1 in) indicated for adult males. The head is rather flat. The dorsum is grass green with diffuse red-brown spots and a chrome yellow dorsolateral stripe. Legs are somewhat lighter and more yellowish. Underside of limbs is pale green; feet and hands are yellow. Throat is turquoise, breast white, and abdomen translucent green. The eye is golden green or, in juveniles, reddish, and has horizontal pupil. Males have numerous black spines on flanks, underside of limbs and feet when in breeding condition.

The male advertisement call is a feeble, barely audible twittering or chirping. Females lay 40–60 eggs measuring 2–2.3 mm (0.079–0.091 in) in diameter. The tadpoles grow a maximum length of 39 mm (1.5 in).

== Habitat and conservation ==
Hyperolius koehleri inhabits moist montane and lowland forest, grassy meadows, and coffee plantations at elevations up to 1,850 m (6,070 ft) above sea level. It is often found near mountain streams with pure and well-aerated water and where it breeds. This species is almost mute, making it hard to find, and its abundance is unknown. Although somewhat adaptable, severe and widespread forest loss is a probable threat, especially when this reduces the water quality.
