= Stereocyclops parkeri =

Conservation status
- Least Concern (IUCN 3.1)

Scientific classification
- Kingdom: Animalia
- Phylum: Chordata
- Class: Amphibia
- Order: Anura
- Family: Microhylidae
- Genus: Stereocyclops
- Species: S. parkeri

Binomial name
- Stereocyclops parkeri (Wettstein, 1934)

Synonyms
- Hypopachus parkeri Wettstein, 1934

Species of frog

Stereocyclops parkeri is a species of frog in the family Microhylidae. It is endemic to southeastern Brazil and known from the southwestern part of the state of Rio de Janeiro and from Ilha de São Sebastião ("Ilhabela"), São Paulo state. For a period it was treated as a synonym of Stereocyclops incrassatus, but is now recognized as valid species.

== Etymology ==
The specific name parkeri honors Hampton Wildman Parker, an English zoologist and herpetologist. It is sometimes known with the common name the Parker's Brazilian dumpy frog.

== Description ==
Stereocyclops parkeri measure about 40 mm (1.6 in) in snout–vent length. The appearance is cryptic.

== Behavior ==
Stereocyclops parkeri show defensive behavior that may enhance its cryptic appearance, giving an impression of a casually dislodged leaf: when disturbed, the individual makes a short leap, landing with its legs stretched backwards. It will then remain still, sometimes as long as 30 minutes, although it may also move a little forward with a quick movement of the feet, resembling a flicked leaf. Similar behavior is observed in Proceratophrys belzebul (reported as Proceratophrys appendiculata, see Dias et al. (2013)) and, in somewhat lesser form, in Zachaenus parvulus. Similar behavior in distantly related frogs suggests convergent evolution.

== Habitat and conservation ==
Stereocyclops parkeri inhabit coastal restinga scrub forests, forest edges, and primary and secondary forests near sea level. They live in leaf litter. The locality in Ilhabela was a vacant lot in an urban area where males were having a chorus in flooded grass. Habitat loss caused by fire, tourism, and human settlement could be a threat to this species.
