= Congolius =

Congolius robustus

Conservation status
- Data Deficient (IUCN 3.1)

Scientific classification
- Kingdom: Animalia
- Phylum: Chordata
- Class: Amphibia
- Order: Anura
- Family: Hyperoliidae
- Genus: Congolius; Nečas, Badjedjea, and Gvoždik, 2021
- Species: C. robustus

Binomial name
- Congolius robustus (Laurent, 1979)

Synonyms
- Hyperolius robustus Laurent, 1979

Genus of frog

Congolius is a genus of frogs in the family Hyperoliidae. It is monotypic, being represented by the single species Congolius robustus. It is endemic to the Democratic Republic of the Congo. Its natural habitats are subtropical or tropical moist lowland forests, swamps, freshwater marshes, intermittent freshwater marshes, rural gardens, and heavily degraded former forest.
