= Nyctimantis siemersi =

Conservation status
- Endangered (IUCN 3.1)

Scientific classification
- Kingdom: Animalia
- Phylum: Chordata
- Class: Amphibia
- Order: Anura
- Family: Hylidae
- Subfamily: Lophyohylinae
- Genus: Nyctimantis
- Species: N. siemersi

Binomial name
- Nyctimantis siemersi (Mertens, 1937)

Synonyms
- Argenteohyla siemersi (Mertens, 1937); Argenteohyla siemersi pederseni Williams & Bosso, 1994; Hyla siemersi Mertens, 1937

Genus of amphibians

Nyctimantis siemersi, commonly known as red-spotted Argentina frog, is a species of frog in the family Hylidae. It is found in the catchment of Paraná River in Argentina and Paraguay, and in the southern coast of Uruguay.

There are two subspecies that might be distinct species: Nyctimantis siemersi siemersi and Nyctimantis siemersi pederseni Williams and Bosso, 1994. A. s. pederseni occurs in leaf axils of terrestrial Aechmea bromeliads in gallery forests along main river systems. It reproduces in temporary pools close to the bromeliads. The nominal subspecies occurs and reproduces in wetlands and the delta of Río Paraná. This rare frog is threatened by habitat loss.
