= Phrynobatrachus phyllophilus =

Conservation status
- Least Concern (IUCN 3.1)

Scientific classification
- Kingdom: Animalia
- Phylum: Chordata
- Class: Amphibia
- Order: Anura
- Family: Phrynobatrachidae
- Genus: Phrynobatrachus
- Species: P. phyllophilus

Binomial name
- Phrynobatrachus phyllophilus Rödel and Ernst, 2002

Species of amphibian

Phrynobatrachus phyllophilus is a species of frogs in the family Phrynobatrachidae. It is found in Sierra Leone, southern Guinea, Liberia, and Ivory Coast. Prior to its description in 2002, it was confused with Phrynobatrachus guineensis, one of its closest relatives. The specific name phyllophilus is derived from the Greek phyllon for leaves and philein for loving. It refers to on the close association of this species with leaf litter.

== Description ==
Adult males measure 12–17 mm (0.47–0.67 in) and adult females 15–23 mm (0.59–0.91 in) in snout–vent length. The snout is moderately pointed. The tympanum is small but distinct. The digits are enlarged to discs. The fingers are unwebbed but the toes are moderately webbed. Roughness of the skin changes within individuals; skin is normally smooth in reproductive males. The dorsal colouration ranges from beige to dark brown. There are black lateral bands. Flanks have sometimes clear spots on flanks, ranging from white, yellow, yellow with a red central part, or red with a fine orange border in colour. There might be a broad orange to red transverse band may cross the back. There is one (occasionally two even three) dark transverse bar on femur and tibia. The belly is white. Throat is black in reproductive males but can be almost white with few blacks spots in non-reproductive males. Females have white to gray throats with irregular dark spots and patches.

The male advertisement call is a series of different brief "clicks" with a metallic quality.

The tadpoles are uniformly brown with hyaline fin carrying few small dots. The largest tadpoles (ready to metamorphose) measure 13 mm (0.51 in) in total length, including a 5 mm body. Metamorphosed froglets measure about 5 mm (0.20 in) in snout–vent length.

== Habitat and ecology ==
Phrynobatrachus phyllophilus occur in swampy parts of primary rainforest at elevations up to 1,000 m (3,300 ft) above sea level, possibly higher. They live in leaf litter. The eggs are deposited terrestrially close to water, the only Phrynobatrachus known to do so. The tadpoles develop in extremely small puddles. The diet consists mostly of insects, particularly coleopterans.

== Conservation ==
Phrynobatrachus phyllophilus is a very common species. It is negatively impacted by habitat loss caused by agricultural development, logging, and expanding human settlements. It might also be locally threatened by mining activities. It occurs in several protected areas, including the Taï National Park (where its type locality is), Mont Péko National Park, and Mount Nimba World Heritage Site.
