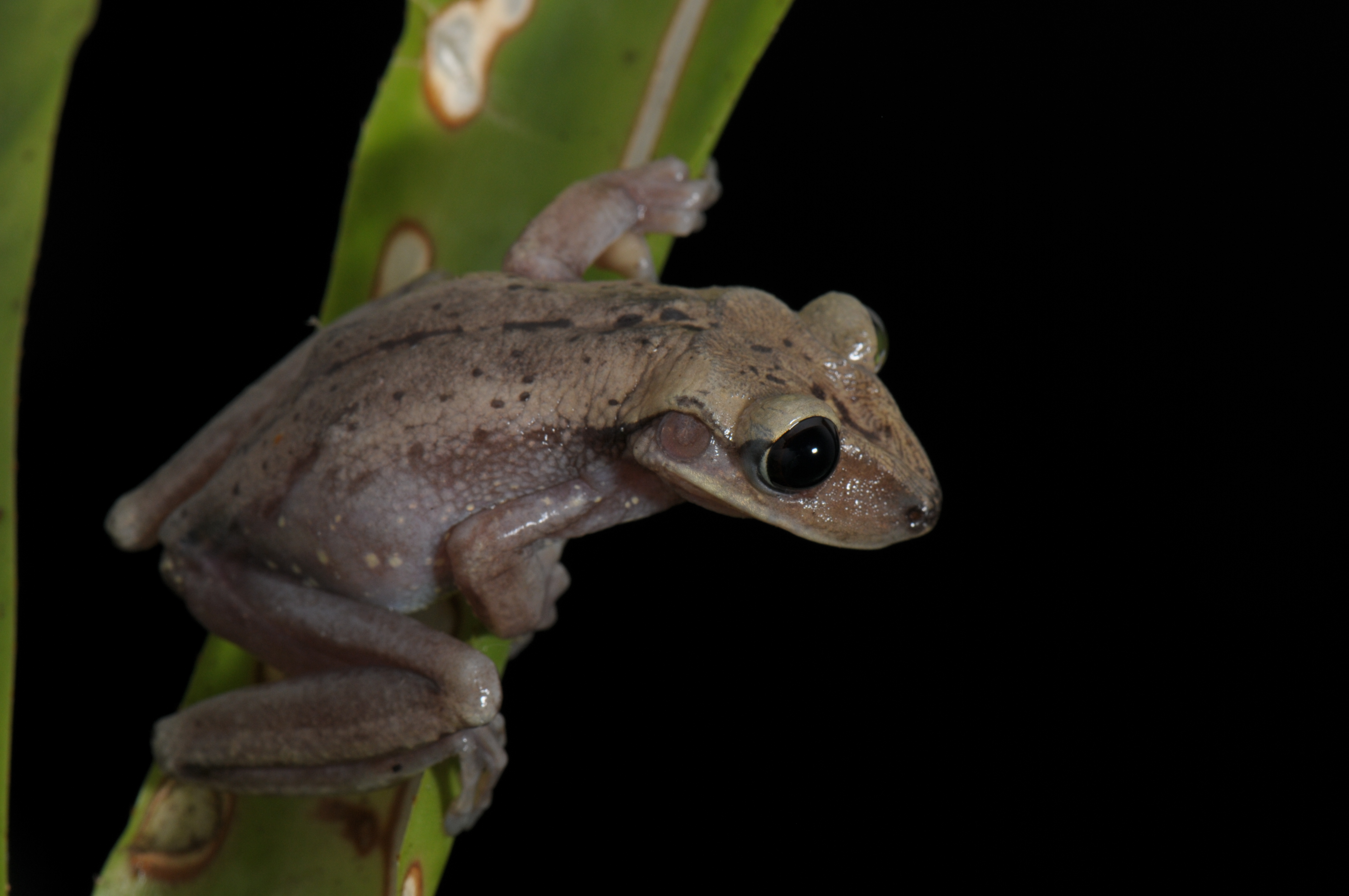

Conservation status
- Data Deficient (IUCN 3.1)

Scientific classification
- Kingdom: Animalia
- Phylum: Chordata
- Class: Amphibia
- Order: Anura
- Family: Hylidae
- Genus: Nyctimantis
- Species: N. bokermanni

Binomial name
- Nyctimantis bokermanni (Pombal, 1993)

Synonyms
- Aparasphenodon bokermanni Pombal, 1993

= Bokermann's casque-headed frog =

Species of amphibian

Bokermann's casque-headed frog (Nyctimantis bokermanni) is a species of frog in the family Hylidae. It is endemic to Brazil, known only from Juréia-Itatins Ecological Station, another location 10 km away and Rio Verde. Its natural habitats are subtropical or tropical moist lowland forests.
