= Nyctimantis arapapa =

Scientific classification
- Kingdom: Animalia
- Phylum: Chordata
- Class: Amphibia
- Order: Anura
- Family: Hylidae
- Genus: Nyctimantis
- Species: N. arapapa

Binomial name
- Nyctimantis arapapa (Pimenta, Napoli, and Haddad, 2009)

Synonyms
- Asparasphenodon arapapa Pimenta, Napoli, and Haddad, 2009

Species of amphibian

Nyctimantis arapapa, also known as Bahia's broad-snout casque-headed tree frog, is a species of frog endemic to the Atlantic Rainforest of southern Bahia, Brazil. The frogs of the genus Nyctimantis are distinguished by a bony plate on top of their heads, referred to as "casque-headed". Casque-headed frogs are characterized by their phragmotic behavior. N. arapapa is further characterized by the long bill-shaped "snout" they possess, similar to that of Triprion petasatus, a head longer than it is wide, and their small size (male snout-vent length 57.4–58.1 mm). This species, and all species of Nyctimantis, use their unique head shape to seal off the leaves of bromeliads, the plant they inhabit solely. This has two known purposes: warding off predators from the frog as well as their young (the male performs this action), and trapping moisture.
