= Nyctimantis pomba =

Scientific classification
- Kingdom: Animalia
- Phylum: Chordata
- Class: Amphibia
- Order: Anura
- Family: Hylidae
- Genus: Nyctimantis
- Species: N. pomba

Binomial name
- Nyctimantis pomba (Assis, Santana, Silva, Quintela, and Feio, 2013)

Synonyms
- Aparasphenodon pomba Assis, Santana, Silva, Quintela, and Feio, 2013

Species of frog

Nyctimantis pomba is a frog in the family Hylidae, endemic to Brazil. Scientists have seen it in exactly one place, 233 meters above sea level in the rainforest in Minas Gerais.

The adult male frog measures 51.6–60.5 mm in snout-vent length and the adult female frog 58.7–62.1 mm. The skin of the dorsum and limbs is dark brown with cream-colored reticulation marks. There are cream-colored spots on the ventrum, and the lips are white. There is a cream-colored stripe extending from the snout over eac eye to the axilla. The iris of the eye is red in color. The specific epithet references the discovery location near the Pomba River.
