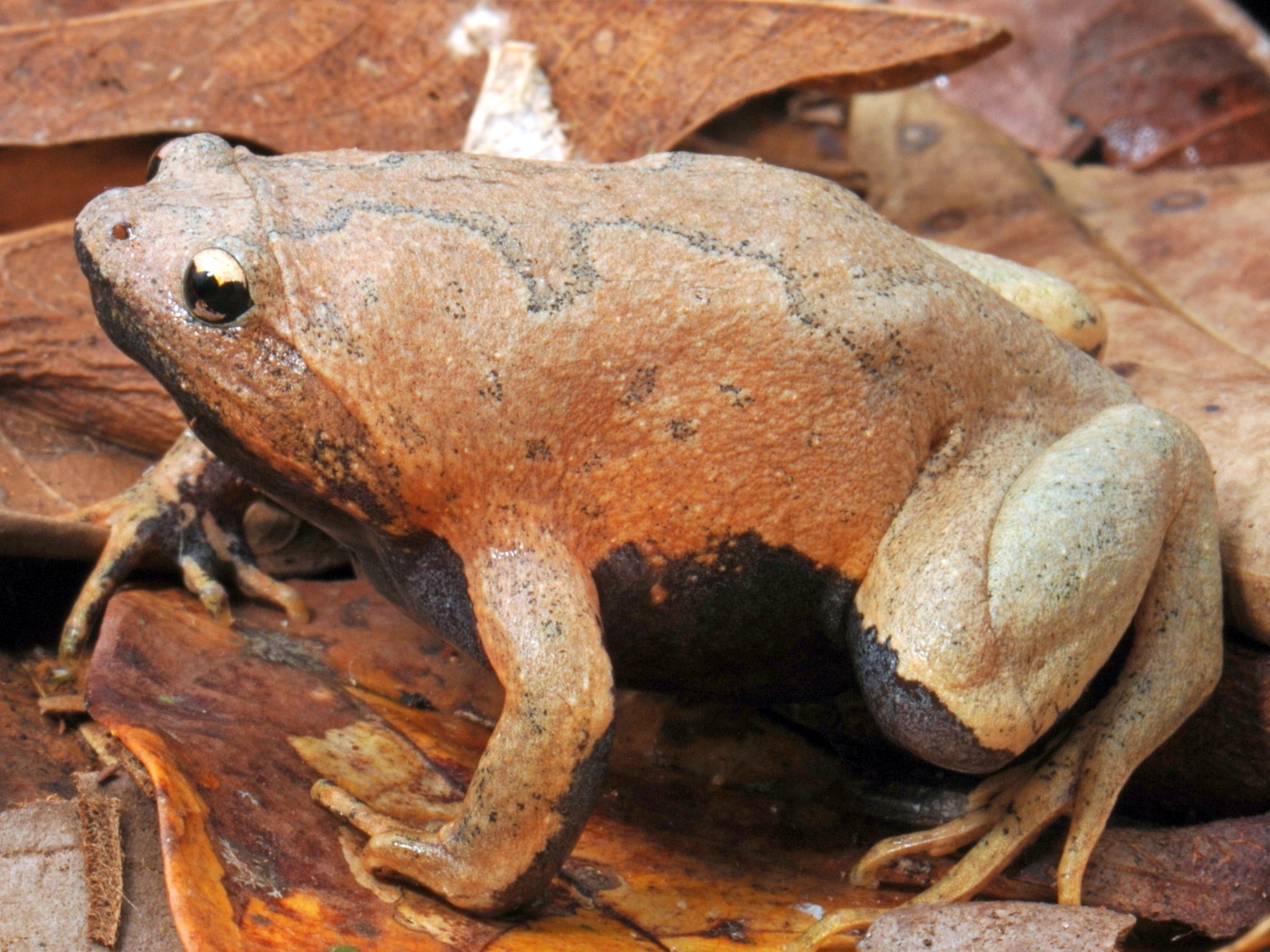

Conservation status
- Least Concern (IUCN 3.1)

Scientific classification
- Kingdom: Animalia
- Phylum: Chordata
- Class: Amphibia
- Order: Anura
- Family: Microhylidae
- Genus: Stereocyclops
- Species: S. incrassatus

Binomial name
- Stereocyclops incrassatus Cope, 1870

Synonyms
- Emydops hypomelas Miranda-Ribeiro, 1920; Hypopachus incrassatus (Cope, 1870); Ribeirina hypomelas (Miranda-Ribeiro, 1920)

= Stereocyclops incrassatus =

Species of frog

Stereocyclops incrassatus is a species of frog in the family Microhylidae. It is endemic to eastern Brazil and is known from Pernambuco and Alagoas in the north and then southward through Bahia to Minas Gerais and Espírito Santo. Earlier records from São Paulo state are now recognized as Stereocyclops parkeri. Common name Brazilian dumpy frog has been coined for this species.

== Description ==
The holotype, an adult male, measures 41 mm (1.6 in) in snout–vent length (SVL). In a population in Linhares observed at the time of breeding, adult males measured 37–46 mm (1.5–1.8 in) and females 38–45 mm (1.5–1.8 in) in SVL. The body is very stout. The snout is short, rounded in dorsal view but more acute in profile. The eyes are small and the tympanum is indistinct. The fingers are fairly long and have no webbing. The toes are long and have basal webbing. Skin is smooth except for a few granules on the sides.

== Habitat and conservation ==
Its natural habitats are primary and secondary forests at elevations below 550 m (1,800 ft). It is a nocturnal species living in leaf litter. They prey on a range of small invertebrates. The dominant prey items in Linhares were ants, followed by beetles and isopods. Breeding seems to be explosive. Breeding takes place in small, temporary ponds inside the forest; the species is not found in open habitat outside forest.

Stereocyclops incrassatus can be very common at breeding sites. Habitat loss is the major threat to this species. It occurs in several protected areas, e.g., Rio Doce State Park.
