= Nyctimantis galeata =

Scientific classification
- Kingdom: Animalia
- Phylum: Chordata
- Class: Amphibia
- Order: Anura
- Family: Hylidae
- Genus: Nyctimantis
- Species: N. galeata

Binomial name
- Nyctimantis galeata (Pombal, Menezes, Fontes, Nunes, Rocha, and Van Sluys, 2012)
- Corythomantis galeata is only known from near Morro do Chapéu, Bahia, Brazil

Synonyms
- Corythomantis galeata Pombal et al., 2012

Species of frog

Nyctimantis galeata is a species of frog in the family Hylidae. It is endemic to Brazil and only known from its type locality near Morro do Chapéu, Bahia, in the northern part of the Espinhaço Mountains. The specific name galeata is derived from Latin and means "covered with a helmet", in reference to the co-ossified head of this frog.

== Description ==
The type series consists of three individuals: two adult females measuring 54 and 56 mm (2.1 and 2.2 in) and an unsexed specimen measuring 47 mm (1.9 in) in snout–vent length. The body is robust. The head is depressed and longer than it is wide; the snout is long. The tympanum is distinct, as is the small supratympanic fold. The fingers and toes have small discs; the fingers have no webbing while the toes are partially webbed. Dorsal skin is smooth. The dorsal color pattern consists of longitudinal stripes: two parallel dark-brown dorsal stripes, mottled with cream dots, run from the head to the inguinal region, parallel with one mid-dorsal stripe and a pair of dorsolateral stripes of cream to bronze color.

== Habitat and conservation ==
The type series was found inside a terrestrial tank bromeliad Hohenbergia vertita. The locality is at 1,000 m (3,300 ft) above sea level and is characterized by generally shallow and sandy soils and with outcrops almost everywhere. The plant cover represented a mosaic of caatinga, cerrado, and campos rupestres vegetation.

As of January 2022, this species has not yet been included in the IUCN Red List of Threatened Species.
