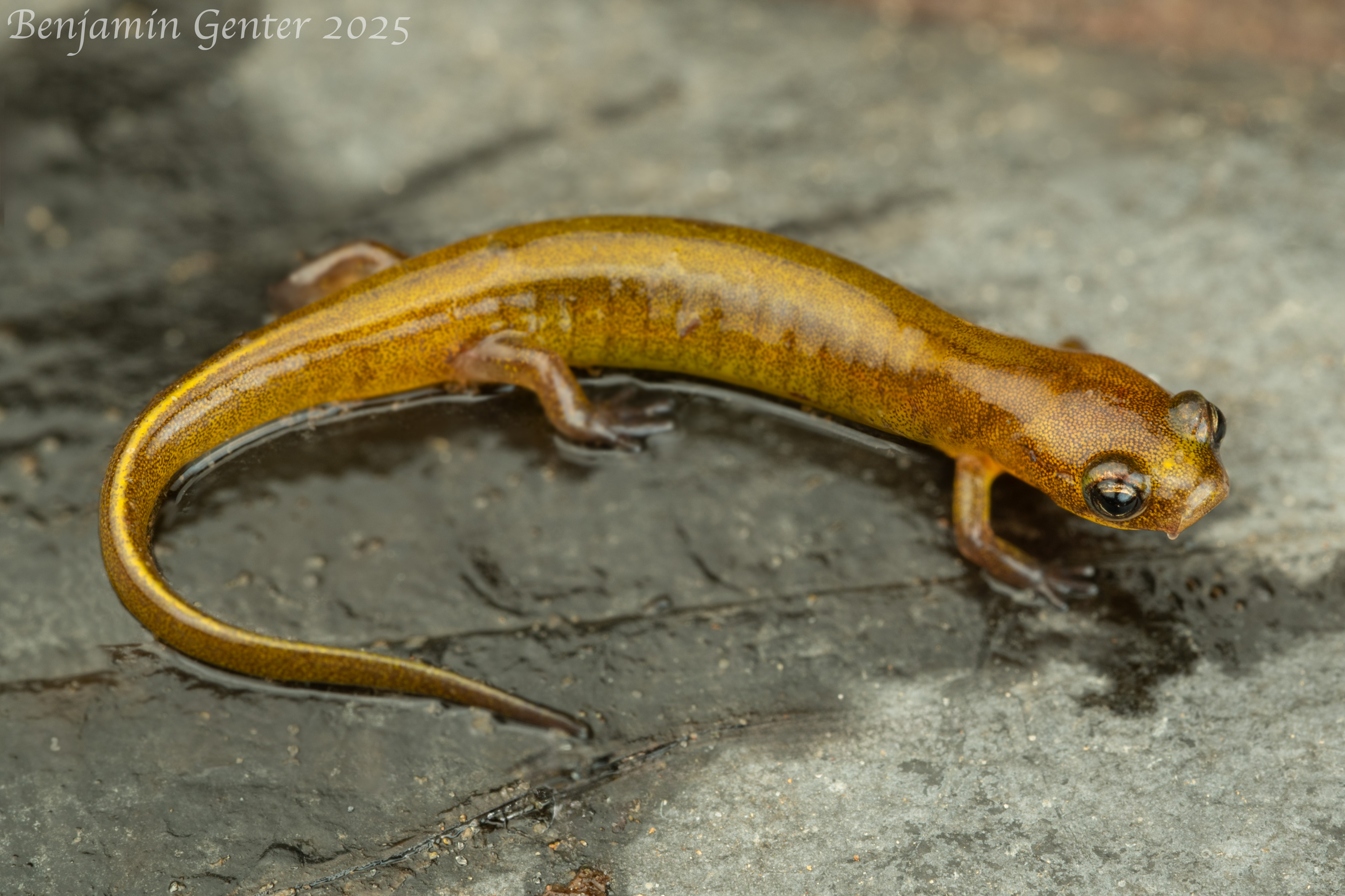
- Adult from Georgia

Conservation status
- Near Threatened (IUCN 3.1)

- Critically Imperiled (NatureServe)

Scientific classification
- Kingdom: Animalia
- Phylum: Chordata
- Class: Amphibia
- Order: Urodela
- Family: Plethodontidae
- Subfamily: Hemidactyliinae
- Genus: Urspelerpes; Camp et al., 2009
- Species: U. brucei

Binomial name
- Urspelerpes brucei Camp et al., 2009

= Urspelerpes =

Genus of salamanders

Urspelerpes is a monotypic genus of salamanders in the family Plethodontidae (the lungless salamanders). It is represented by a single species, the patch-nosed salamander (Urspelerpes brucei), a lungless miniature salamander found in streams of Georgia and South Carolina, United States. Discovered in 2007, it marks the first discovery of an endemic amphibian genus from the United States since the Red Hills salamander (Phaeognathus) in 1961. This species is also one of only a few plethodontids requiring a new genus description in 50 years.

== Description ==
This genus is believed to be closely related to brook salamanders (genus Eurycea), but have five toes on their feet. A distinctive characteristic is a patch on the snout that transitions from white in larvae to yellow in adults. Urspelerpes is tiny, and adults are about 5 cm (2 in) long. Males and females have different coloration, with males having a pair of dark stripes running down their bodies, with yellow backs, and females being more muted in color (a more common trait in birds). Similar to other salamander species, this genus is believed to eat small terrestrial prey using its projectile tongue. Despite the salamander's small size U. brucei larvae take 24 months to metamorphose into an adult.

== Distribution and habitat ==
The description of the species, published online in June 2009, for the Journal of Zoology, was based on specimens collected at Stephens County, Georgia, (near Toccoa) in 2007, and several other sites in northeast Georgia and northwest South Carolina (a region rich in salamander species). U. brucei is endemic to the United States and is its second-smallest salamander averaging about 25mm in snout-vent length. The Tugaloo River, 50 m in width, forms the political boundary between GA and SC and bisects the tiny range of U. brucei. It is currently theorized that U. brucei's gene flow was disrupted by the Tugaloo river. The species on either side of the river are ever so slightly genetically distant. The species is often found in leaf litter with areas with high canopy closure.

== Etymology ==
The name Urspelerpes means "archaic" (ur) and "cave creeper" (spelerpes) in Ancient Greek. The specific epithet brucei honors a professor at Western Carolina University, Richard Bruce.

== Conservation status ==
The patch-nosed salamander (Urspelerpes brucei) is a highly secretive salamander whose ecology and status are unclear. However, due to namely habitat degradation, global climate change, and disease, this species is likely threatened.
