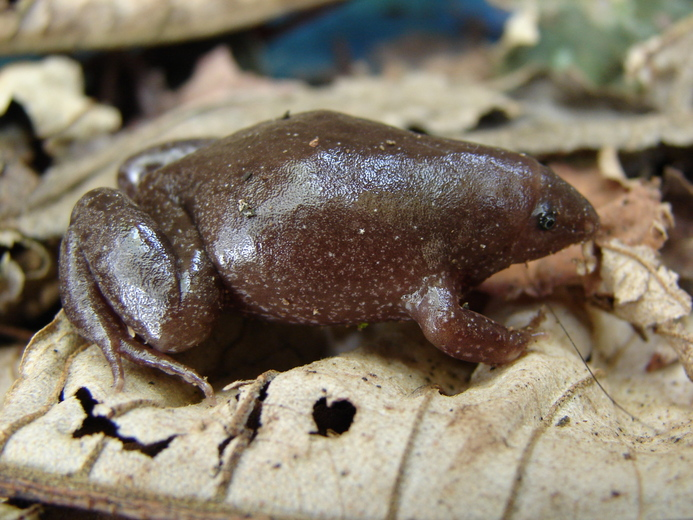

Conservation status
- Least Concern (IUCN 3.1)

Scientific classification
- Kingdom: Animalia
- Phylum: Chordata
- Class: Amphibia
- Order: Anura
- Family: Microhylidae
- Subfamily: Gastrophryninae
- Genus: Myersiella; A. L. Carvalho, 1954
- Species: M. microps

Binomial name
- Myersiella microps (Duméril and Bibron, 1841)

Synonyms
- Engystoma microps Duméril and Bibron, 1841; Gastrophryne microps (Duméril and Bibron, 1841); Microhyla microps (Duméril and Bibron, 1841); Engystoma sub-nigrum Miranda-Ribeiro, 1920; Microhyla subnigra (Miranda-Ribeiro, 1920); Myersiella subnigra (Miranda-Ribeiro, 1920); Engystoma dumerili Miranda-Ribeiro, 1926 – substitute name for Engystoma microps

= Myersiella =

Genus of amphibians

Myersiella is a genus of frogs in the family Microhylidae. It is monotypic, being represented by the single species, Myersiella microps. It is endemic to southeastern Brazil and occurs in Espírito Santo, Rio de Janeiro, southeastern Minas Gerais, and southeastern São Paulo state. The genus name honors George S. Myers. The genus is sometimes known as the elongated frogs, while the sole species is known as Rio elongated frog.

== Taxonomy ==
Myersiella was originally defined based on skeletal morphology. Later studies based on molecular data have supported its recognition as a monophyletic group, with Dasypops as its sister taxon.

== Description ==
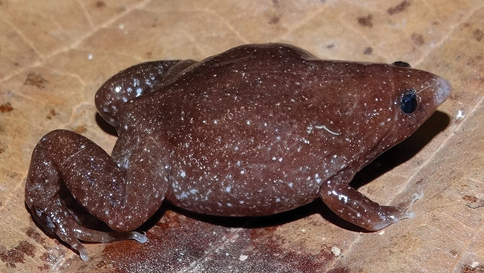
Espírito Santo, Brazil

Adult males measure 20–25 mm (0.8–1.0 in) and adult females 25–46 mm (1.0–1.8 in) in snout–vent length. The head is very small but with a prominent, pointed snout. No tympanum is visible. The eyes are very small. The limbs are short and stout; the fingers and toes are cylindrical and have no webbing. Coloration is relatively uniform dark lead grey with very light brown ventral flecking. Males have blackened throats.

The male advertisement call is a long frequency-modulated note dominated by frequences between 2.4 and 2.6 kHz. Myersiella microps has direct development (i.e., there is no free-living larval stage).

== Habitat and ecology ==
Myersiella microps occur in primary and secondary forest at elevations below 1,100 m (3,600 ft). They live in the leaf litter on the forest floor and under fallen tree trunks and rocks. Males have been observed calling on the forest floor during rains. The larvae develop in the eggs in the leaf litter. Their diet consists of ants.

== Conservation ==
Myersiella microps is a very common species, but it is difficult to find. This species does not occur in open areas and can be threatened by loss of its forest habitat. However, it does occur in several protected areas.
