= Liua tsinpaensis =

Conservation status
- Vulnerable (IUCN 3.1)

Scientific classification
- Kingdom: Animalia
- Phylum: Chordata
- Class: Amphibia
- Order: Urodela
- Family: Hynobiidae
- Genus: Liua
- Species: L. tsinpaensis

Binomial name
- Liua tsinpaensis (Liu & Hu, 1966)

Synonyms
- Ranodon tsinpaensis Liu & Hu, 1966

Species of amphibian

Liua tsinpaensis, the Tsinpa salamander, is a species of salamander in the family Hynobiidae. It is synonymous with Ranodon tsinpaensis and is endemic to China. It occurs in southern Shaanxi (Zhouzhi County and Ningshan County) and in Wanyuan, northeastern Sichuan. Its natural habitats are subtropical or tropical moist montane forests and rivers. It is threatened by habitat loss.

== Description ==
Liua tsinpaensis has a round and flat head, which is equal in length and width and has no labial fold. This salamander reaches total lengths between 12.5 and 13.6 cm.
