= Opisthothylax =

Conservation status
- Least Concern (IUCN 3.1)

Scientific classification
- Kingdom: Animalia
- Phylum: Chordata
- Class: Amphibia
- Order: Anura
- Family: Hyperoliidae
- Genus: Opisthothylax; Perret, 1966
- Species: O. immaculatus

Binomial name
- Opisthothylax immaculatus (Boulenger, 1903)

Synonyms
- Megalixalus immaculatus Boulenger, 1903

Genus of amphibians

Opisthothylax is a monotypic frog genus in the family Hyperoliidae. The sole species is Opisthothylax immaculatus, also known as the gray-eyed frog . It is found in southern Nigeria, Cameroon, Equatorial Guinea, Gabon, western Republic of Congo, and southwestern Democratic Republic of the Congo. It might also be present in the Cabinda Enclave of Angola and in the Central African Republic.

== Description ==
Adult males measure 30–33 mm (1.2–1.3 in) in snout–vent length. The dorsal colouration is reddish-brown or orange to yellowish. In most individuals, there are two small, dark occipital spots. The ventral surfaces of the body and limbs are light yellow. The pupil is vertical and the iris light golden yellow. There is no visible tympanum. The skin is warty. The toe discs are expanded. Males have a large gular flap and a non-distensible vocal sac.

== Habitat and conservation ==
Its natural habitats are closed-canopy, undisturbed rainforests. It is an arboreal frog found high up in the foliage. It lays its eggs in a foam nest attached to leaves above slow-flowing streams—the only species to do so within the family Hyperoliidae. The tadpoles drop to the water after hatching.

Opisthothylax immaculatus is a widespread species, but its population density is low. Habitat loss is probably a threat to it. It occurs in the Korup National Park in Cameroon, probably also in other protected areas.
