= Kassinula =

Conservation status
- Least Concern (IUCN 3.1)

Scientific classification
- Kingdom: Animalia
- Phylum: Chordata
- Class: Amphibia
- Order: Anura
- Family: Hyperoliidae
- Genus: Kassinula; Laurent, 1940
- Species: K. wittei

Binomial name
- Kassinula wittei Laurent, 1940

Genus of amphibians

Kassinula is a genus of frogs in the family Hyperoliidae. It is monotypic, being represented by the single species, Kassinula wittei. It is found in Democratic Republic of the Congo, Zambia, and possibly Angola. Its natural habitats are moist savanna, subtropical or tropical seasonally wet or flooded lowland grassland, intermittent freshwater lakes, and intermittent freshwater marshes.
