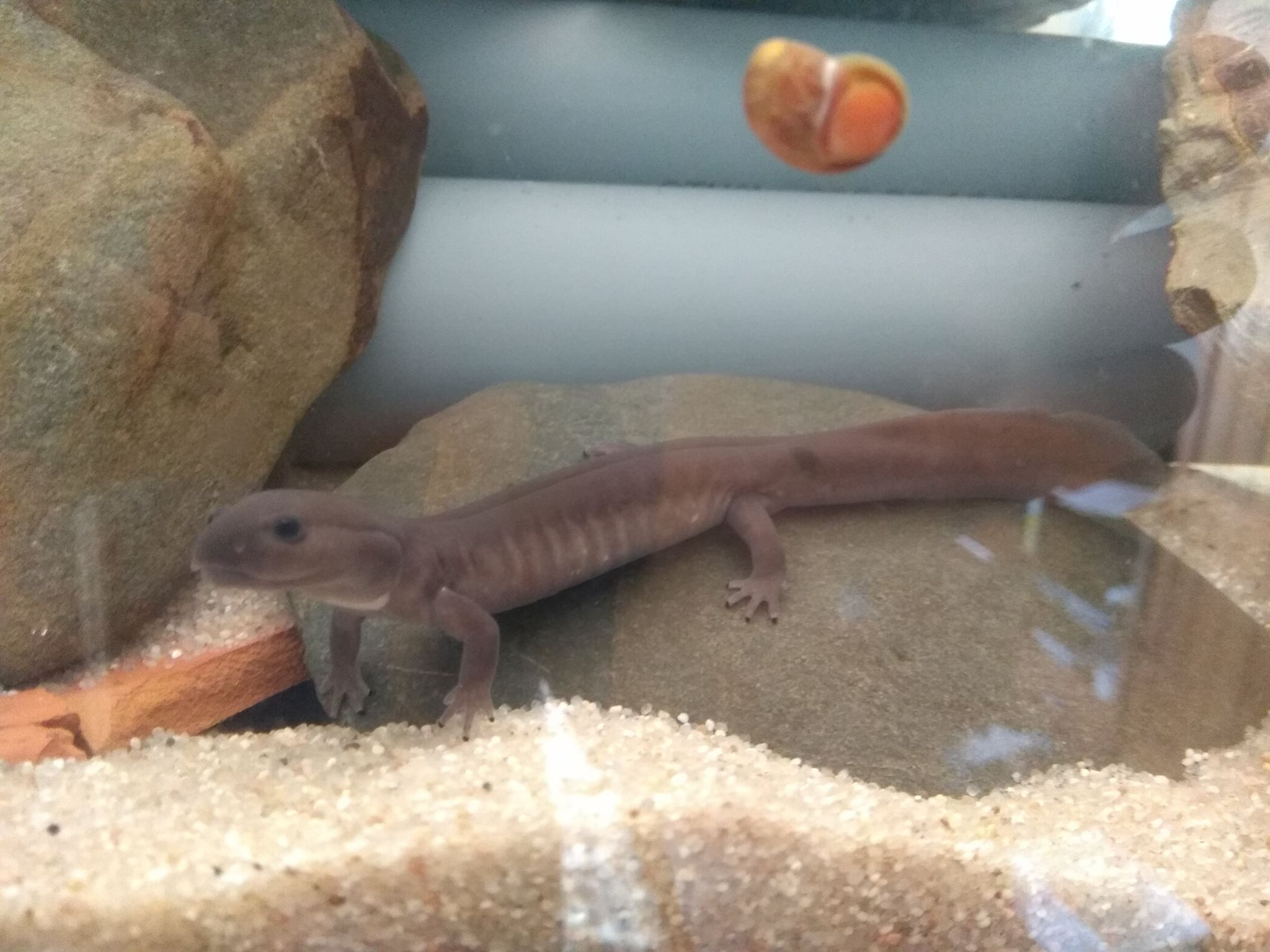
- Two year old
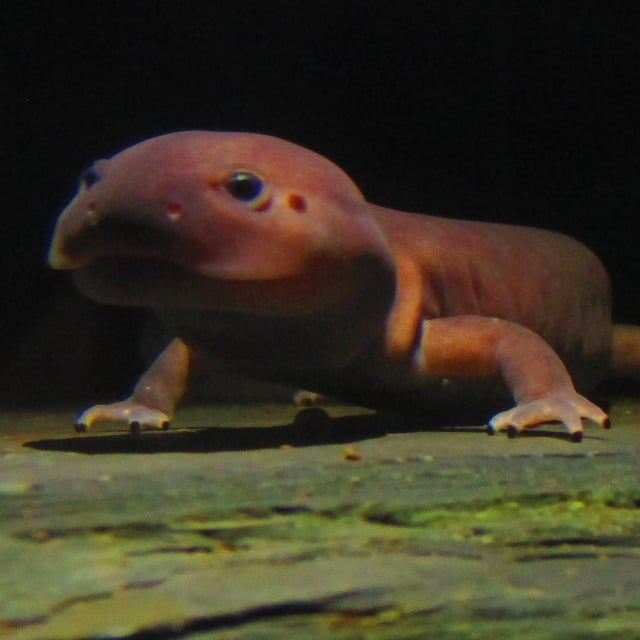
- Male

Conservation status
- Vulnerable (IUCN 3.1)

Scientific classification
- Kingdom: Animalia
- Phylum: Chordata
- Class: Amphibia
- Order: Urodela
- Family: Hynobiidae
- Subfamily: Hynobiinae
- Genus: Pachyhynobius; Fei, Qu & Wu, 1983
- Species: P. shangchengensis

Binomial name
- Pachyhynobius shangchengensis Fei, Qu & Wu, 1983

= Pachyhynobius =

Genus of salamanders

Pachyhynobius shangchengensis, the Shangcheng stout salamander, is a species of salamander in the family Hynobiidae. It is monotypic within the genus Pachyhynobius. It is named after its type locality, Shangcheng. It is endemic to the Dabie Mountains in central China (Hubei, Henan, and Anhui Provinces). Its natural habitats are subtropical moist lowland forests, montane forests, and rivers. It is threatened by habitat loss.

The Shancheng stout salamander is stout, with a cylindrical body and pronounced sexual dimorphism: the adult male develops a thick, broad head. Adult males have a total length of 150–184 mm (5.9–7.2 in) and females of about 157–176 mm (6.2–6.9 in).
