= Seychelles treefrog =

Seychelle Islands treefrog

Conservation status
- Least Concern (IUCN 3.1)

Scientific classification
- Kingdom: Animalia
- Phylum: Chordata
- Class: Amphibia
- Order: Anura
- Family: Hyperoliidae
- Genus: Tachycnemis; Fitzinger, 1843
- Species: T. seychellensis

Binomial name
- Tachycnemis seychellensis (Duméril & Bibron, 1841)

Species of amphibian

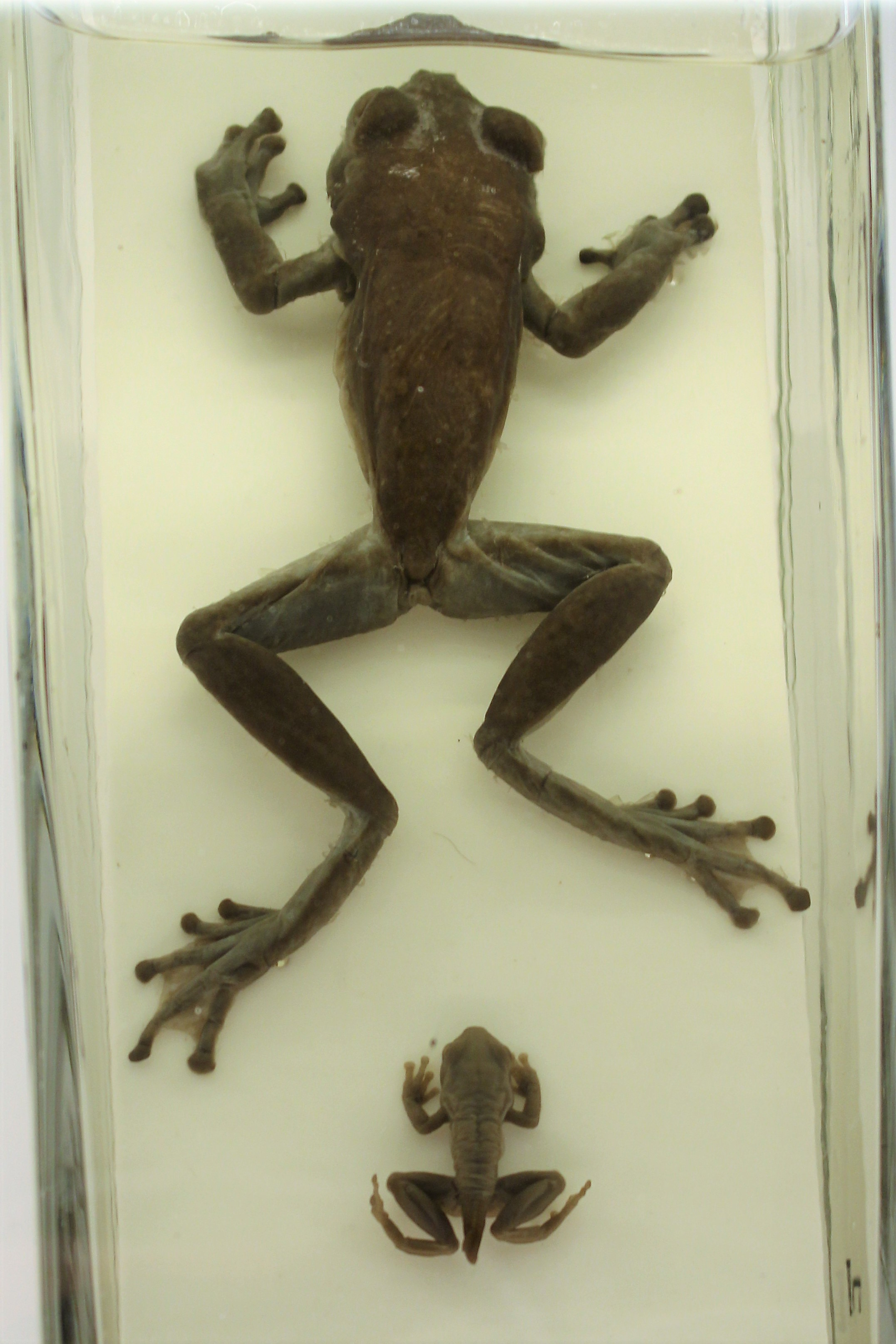
Tachycnemis seychellensis at the Cambridge University Museum of Zoology

The Seychelle Islands treefrog or Seychelles treefrog (Tachycnemis seychellensis) is a species of frog in the family Hyperoliidae. It is endemic to Seychelles. Its natural habitats are subtropical or tropical moist lowland forest, rivers, swamps, freshwater marshes, intermittent freshwater marshes, plantations, rural gardens, heavily degraded former forest, and irrigated land.

T. seychellensis is the only species in the genus Tachycnemis.

Currently, the granitic Seychelles are the remaining emergent part of a continental fragment, previously part of Gondwana, that was associated with India and Madagascar when they separated from Africa during the Cretaceous.
