= Arlequinus =

Mebebque frog

Conservation status
- Endangered (IUCN 3.1)

Scientific classification
- Kingdom: Animalia
- Phylum: Chordata
- Class: Amphibia
- Order: Anura
- Family: Hyperoliidae
- Genus: Arlequinus; Perret, 1988
- Species: A. krebsi

Binomial name
- Arlequinus krebsi (Mertens, 1938)

Synonyms
- Hyperolius krebsi Mertens, 1938

Genus of amphibians

Arlequinus is a genus of frogs in the family Hyperoliidae endemic to the Western High Plateau and Mount Cameroon, Cameroon. It is monotypic, being represented by the single species Arlequinus krebsi, commonly known as the Mebebque frog. Its natural habitats are dense tropical forest; it is threatened by habitat loss caused by wood cutting, agriculture, and human settlement.

Arlequinus krebsi lay their eggs above small pools with stagnant or slowly flowing water; tadpoles develop in these pools. This species is presumed to be mute, making the adults difficult to find.
