= Phrynobatrachus guineensis =

Conservation status
- Least Concern (IUCN 3.1)

Scientific classification
- Kingdom: Animalia
- Phylum: Chordata
- Class: Amphibia
- Order: Anura
- Family: Phrynobatrachidae
- Genus: Phrynobatrachus
- Species: P. guineensis

Binomial name
- Phrynobatrachus guineensis Guibé and Lamotte, 1962 "1961"

Species of frog

Phrynobatrachus guineensis is a species of frog in the family Phrynobatrachidae. It is found in Sierra Leone, southern Guinea, Liberia, and western Ivory Coast. Common name Guinea river frog has been coined for it, although it is actually associated with drier parts of primary rainforest.

== Taxonomy ==
Phrynobatrachus guineensis was described in 1962. Prior to its description in 2002, Phrynobatrachus phyllophilus was confused with species; the original species description mixed characteristics of both species. However, the two species can be distinguished morphologically and based on the male advertisement calls. In addition, they mostly occur in different habitats, despite having similar overall distribution: Phrynobatrachus guineensis is nearly always found in drier parts of the forest, whereas Phrynobatrachus phyllophilus clearly prefer swampy habitats.

== Description ==
Adult males measure 12–17 mm (0.47–0.67 in) and adult females 16–22 mm (0.63–0.87 in) in snout–vent length. Many specimens have a vertebral line. The hips are yellow and the toe and finger tips are orange. The belly shows large black spots. Reproductive males have extremely swollen thumbs.

== Habitat and conservation ==
Phrynobatrachus guineensis occur in the drier parts of primary rainforest at elevations up to 1,000 m (3,300 ft) above sea level. They live arboreally, usually low in the trees. Breeding takes place in tree holes, but also in tiny waterbodies such as empty nuts and snail shells. The eggs are attached to the bark of the tree or similar position above the water. After hatching, the tadpoles drop into the water where they complete their development.

Phrynobatrachus guineensis is a common species in suitable habitats. It is negatively impacted by habitat loss caused by agricultural development, logging, and expanding human settlements. It might also be locally threatened by mining activities. It occurs in Taï National Park and Mount Nimba World Heritage Site.
