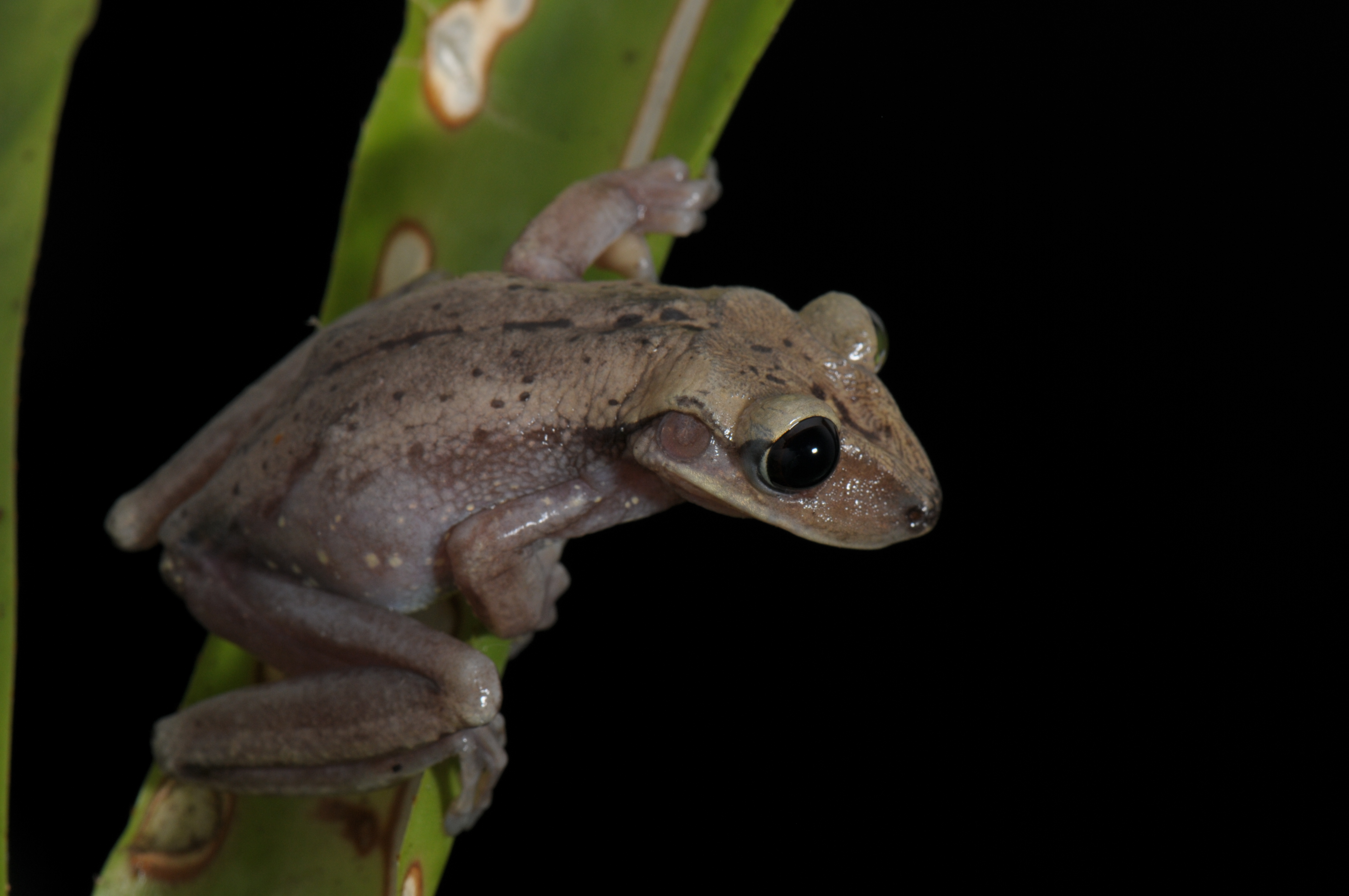
- Nyctimantis bokermanni

Scientific classification
- Kingdom: Animalia
- Phylum: Chordata
- Class: Amphibia
- Order: Anura
- Family: Hylidae
- Subfamily: Lophyohylinae
- Genus: Nyctimantis; Boulenger, 1882

Species
- see text

Synonyms
- Aparasphenodon Miranda-Ribeiro, 1920 Argenteohyla Trueb, 1970

= Nyctimantis =

Genus of amphibians

Nyctimantis is a genus of frogs in the family Hylidae. The genus is found in south-eastern Brazil as well as in the Orinoco Basin in Venezuela, Colombia, and Brazil. These are tree-dwelling species usually hiding in the cisterns of epiphytic bromeliads. The top of the head carries a bony plate which is fused with the skin.

In 2021, based on phylogenetic evidence, the genus was redefined to include most species previously included in genera Aparasphenodon and Argenteohyla, which are now treated as synonyms of Nyctimantis.

== Species ==
The following species are recognised in the genus Nyctimantis:

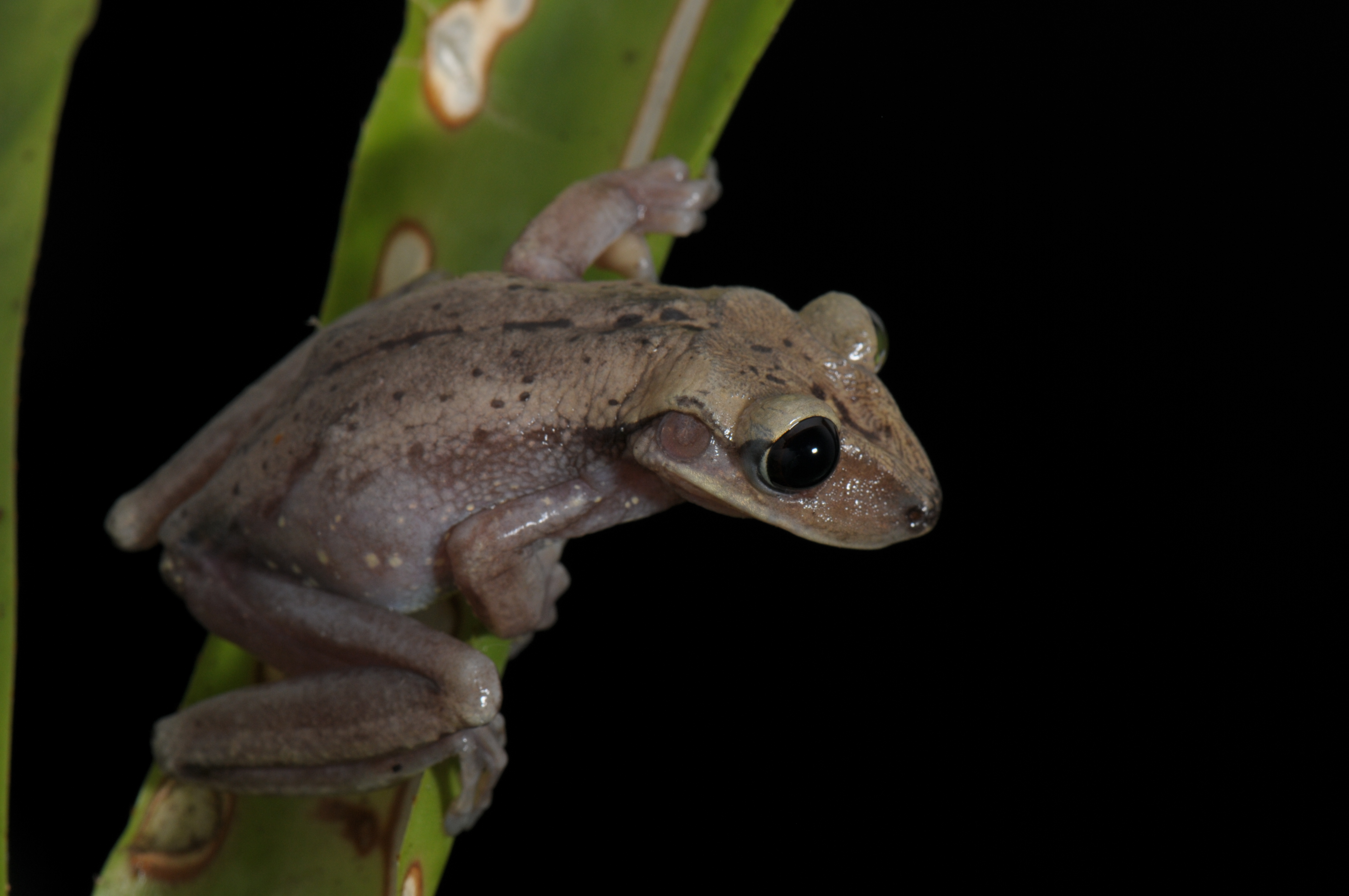
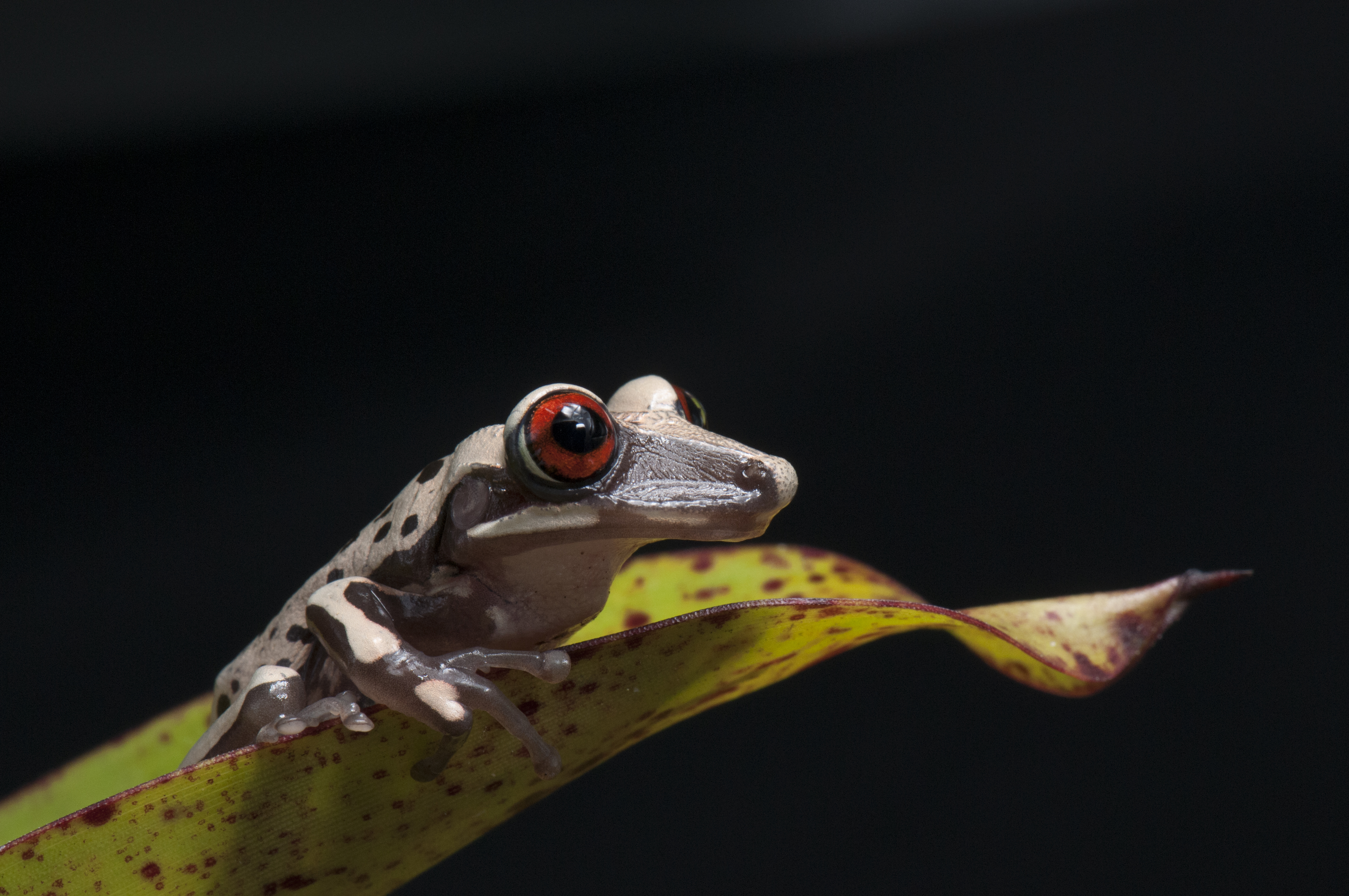
Image	Binomial Name and Author	Common name
	Nyctimantis arapapa Pimenta, Napoli & Haddad, 2009	Bahia's broad-snout casque-headed tree frog
	Nyctimantis bokermanni Pombal, 1993	Bokermann's casque-headed frog
	Nyctimantis brunoi Miranda-Ribeiro, 1920	Bruno's casque-headed frog
	Nyctimantis galeata (Pombal, Menezes, Fontes, Nunes, Rocha, and Van Sluys, 2012)
	Nyctimantis pomba Assis, Santana, Silva, Quintela, and Feio, 2013	Rio Pomba's spotted tree frog
	Nyctimantis rugiceps Boulenger, 1882	Brown-eyed treefrog
	Nyctimantis siemersi (Mertens, 1937)	Red-spotted Argentina frog
