= Parker's tree toad =

Conservation status
- Data Deficient (IUCN 3.1)

Scientific classification
- Kingdom: Animalia
- Phylum: Chordata
- Class: Amphibia
- Order: Anura
- Family: Bufonidae
- Genus: Laurentophryne; Tihen, 1960
- Species: L. parkeri

Binomial name
- Laurentophryne parkeri (Laurent, 1950)

Synonyms
- Wolterstorffina parkeri

Species of amphibian

Parker's tree toad (Laurentophryne parkeri) is a species of toad in the family Bufonidae. It is the only species in the genus Laurentophryne and is endemic to the Kivu region of the Democratic Republic of the Congo. Its natural habitat consists of subtropical or tropical moist montane forests, and it is currently threatened by habitat loss.

Description

Parker's tree toad has a straight head and a pointed snout that extends beyond its mouth. Its dorsal skin is granular, featuring multiple warts arranged more or less in rows starting from the snout, extending to the shoulders, and beyond. These warts form a distinctive X pattern on its back, typically colored grey or greyish-white.

Diagnosis

According to Tihen (1960), Parker's tree toad is "an African bufonid related to Nectophryne, but differing in the absence of lamelliform sub-digital pads and the possession of a palatine bone; differing from Wolterstorffina, Bufo, and Nectophrynoides in possessing only seven presacral vertebrae and in having the palatine bone reduced in extent. It also differs from the last two genera in the fusion of the sacrum and coccyx.
