= Paracassina =

Scientific classification
- Kingdom: Animalia
- Phylum: Chordata
- Class: Amphibia
- Order: Anura
- Family: Hyperoliidae
- Genus: Paracassina; Peracca, 1907

Diversity
- 2 species (see text)

Synonyms
- Mocquardia Ahl, 1931; Rothschildia Mocquard, 1905 (non Grote, 1896: preoccupied); Tornierella Ahl, 1924

Genus of amphibians

Paracassina is a genus of frogs in the family Hyperoliidae, sometimes known as common striped frogs. They are endemic to central Ethiopia.

== Species ==
It contains the following species:

- Paracassina kounhiensis (Mocquard, 1905)
- Paracassina obscura (Boulenger, 1895)
