= Callixalus =

Conservation status
- Vulnerable (IUCN 3.1)

Scientific classification
- Kingdom: Animalia
- Phylum: Chordata
- Class: Amphibia
- Order: Anura
- Family: Hyperoliidae
- Genus: Callixalus; Laurent, 1950
- Species: C. pictus

Binomial name
- Callixalus pictus Laurent, 1950

Genus of amphibians

Callixalus is a genus frogs in the family Hyperoliidae. It is monotypic, being represented by a single species, Callixalus pictus. It is found in the eastern Democratic Republic of the Congo (including the Itombwe Mountains) and western Rwanda. It is sometimes known as the African painted frog.

== Description ==
Males grow to 37 mm (1.5 in) and females 43 mm (1.7 in) in snout–vent length. Dorsum is warty and chocolate brown to almost black and has many small orange or golden spots. There is no vocal sac; the males appear to be mute.

== Habitat and conservation ==
The natural habitats of Callixalus pictus are high-altitude forests, especially bamboo forests, above 2,100 m (6,900 ft) asl but more commonly only above 2,400 m (7,900 ft). During the day time they hide in broken bamboo stumps or between the bark and the moss covering tree trunks.

Callixalus pictus is threatened by habitat loss caused by agriculture, livestock farming, wood extraction, and expanding human settlements.
