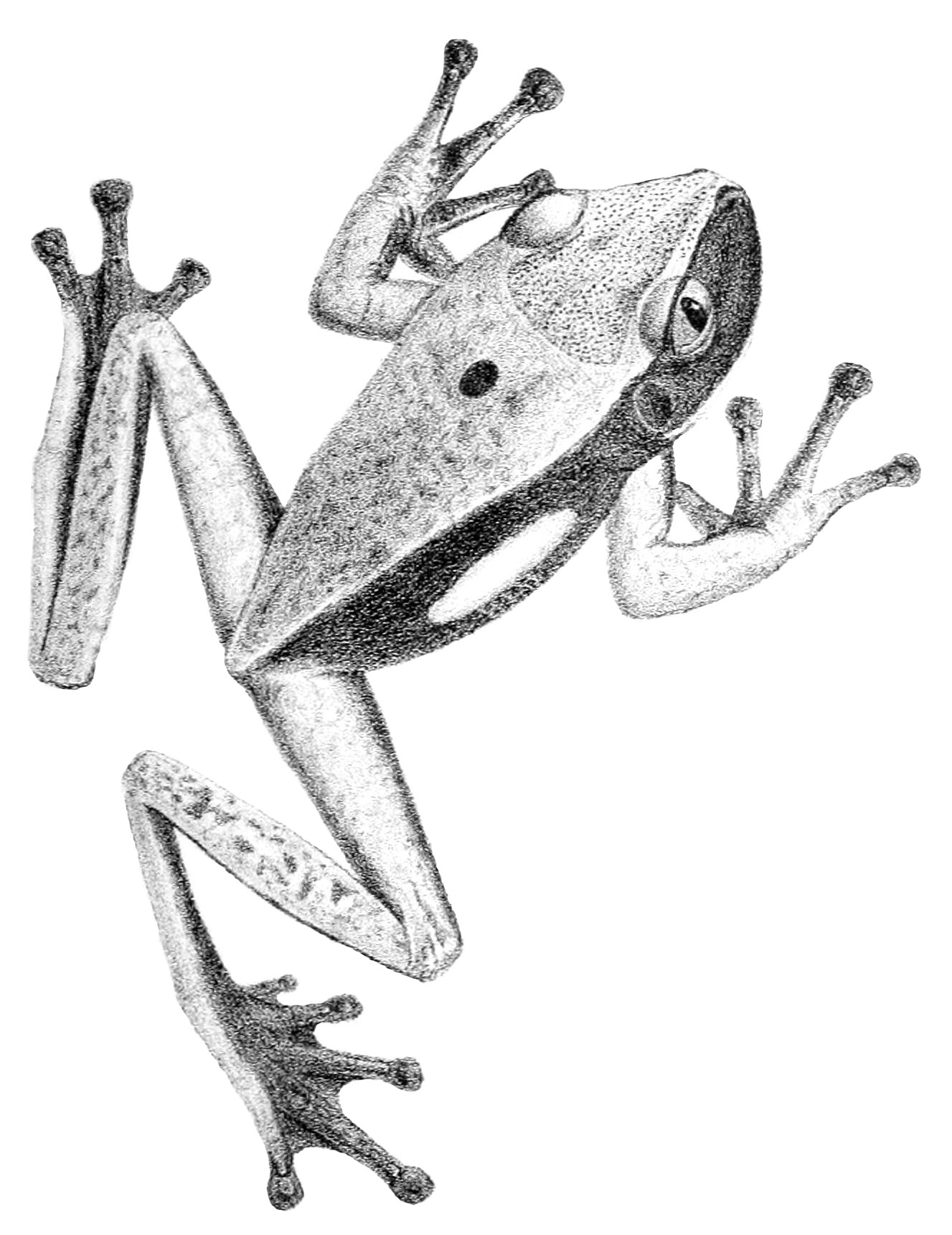

Conservation status
- Least Concern (IUCN 3.1)

Scientific classification
- Kingdom: Animalia
- Phylum: Chordata
- Class: Amphibia
- Order: Anura
- Family: Hylidae
- Subfamily: Lophyohylinae
- Genus: Nyctimantis
- Species: N. rugiceps

Binomial name
- Nyctimantis rugiceps Boulenger, 1882

= Nyctimantis rugiceps =

Species of frog

Nyctimantis rugiceps, commonly known as the brown-eyed treefrog, is a species of frog in the family Hylidae. It is known from the Amazon rainforest in Ecuador, Peru, and Colombia, and it is likely to also occur in adjacent Brazil. Its natural habitats are primary and secondary lowland tropical rainforest.

Nyctimantis rugiceps breeds in bamboo and tree holes. Females raise the tadpoles on trophic (unfertilized) eggs.
