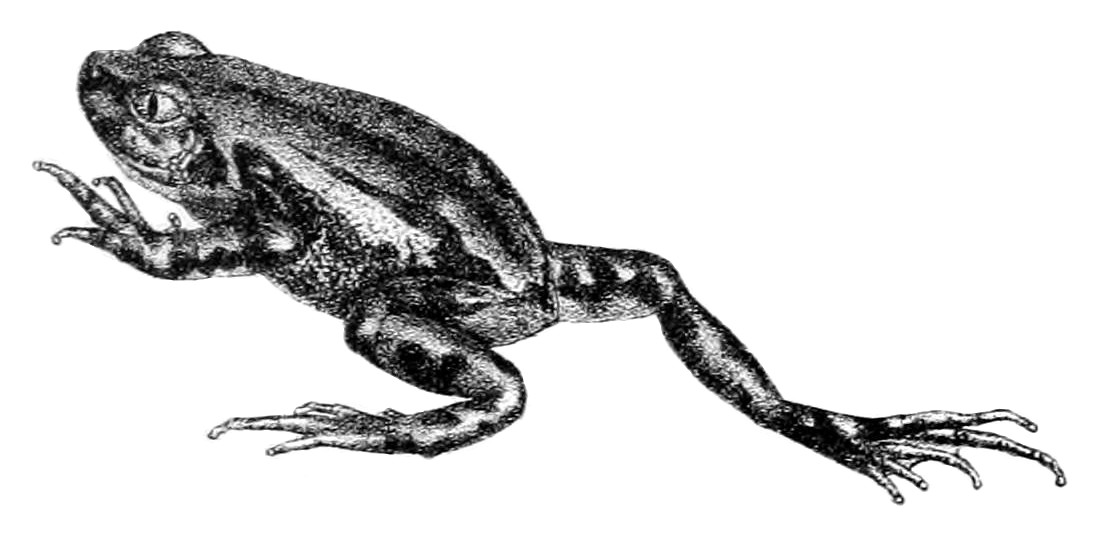

Conservation status
- Least Concern (IUCN 3.1)

Scientific classification
- Kingdom: Animalia
- Phylum: Chordata
- Class: Amphibia
- Order: Anura
- Family: Hyperoliidae
- Genus: Semnodactylus; Hoffman, 1939
- Species: S. wealii

Binomial name
- Semnodactylus wealii (Boulenger, 1882)

Synonyms
- Cassina wealii Boulenger, 1882; Cassina wealii quinquevittata Hewitt, 1927; Semnodactylus thabanchuensis Hoffman, 1939; Kassina weali fitzsimonsi Hoffman, 1942

= Weale's running frog =

Species of amphibian

Weale's running frog (Semnodactylus wealii), also known as Weale's frog, rattling frog, and many other commons names, is a species of frog in the family Hyperoliidae. It is monotypic within the genus Semnodactylus. It is found in southern and eastern South Africa, Lesotho, and Eswatini.

== Etymology ==
The specific name wealii honours James Philip Mansel Weale, an English amateur entomologist who farmed in Bedford, Eastern Cape, and sent specimens to England.

== Description ==
Semnodactylus wealii grow to 44 mm (1.7 in) in snout–vent length. The limbs are thin and long. The dorsum is yellowish-brownto grey and has three dark longitudinal bands, each with a pale center. The flanks have a dark stripe or a series of blotches. The concealed parts of the limbs are yellow to orange. The throat in breeding males is black.

The male advertisement call is a low-pitched creak, resembling the sound of a cork being removed from a bottle.

== Habitat and conservation ==
Weale's running frog is a common frog mostly occurring in grassland habitats at elevations below 1,700 m (5,600 ft); in Western Cape it is also found in fynbos heath. It breeds in all sort of ponds (both permanent and temporary, and natural and artificial) that have emergent vegetation. It is present in many protected areas, tolerates disturbance, and is not facing any major threats.
