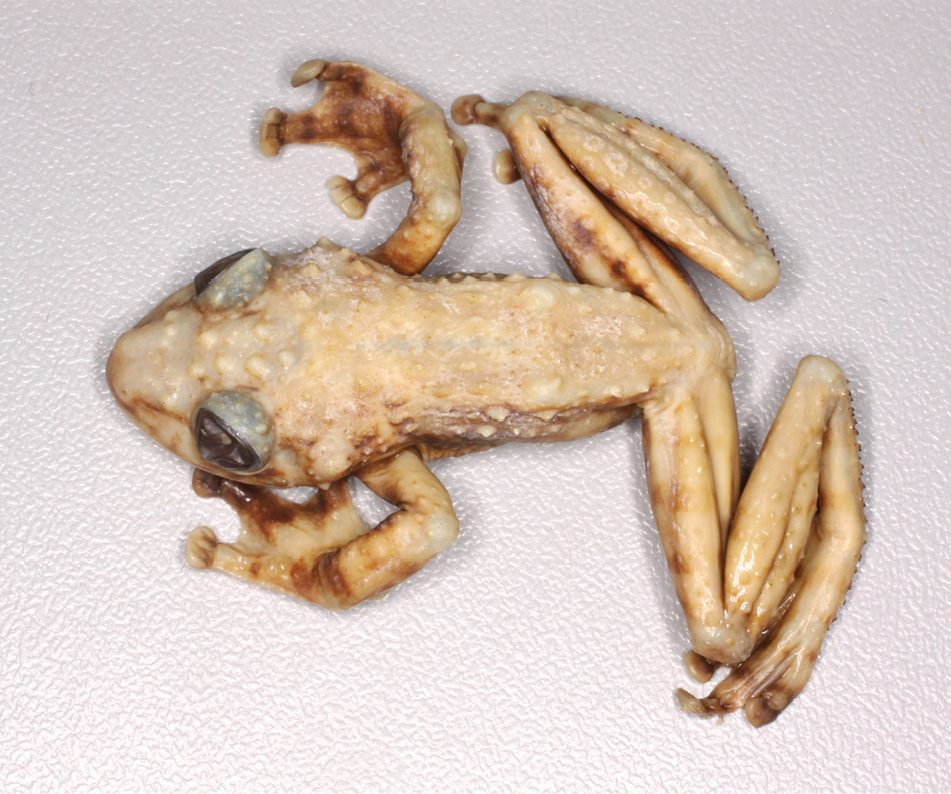
- Acanthixalus spinosus

Scientific classification
- Domain: Eukaryota
- Kingdom: Animalia
- Phylum: Chordata
- Class: Amphibia
- Order: Anura
- Family: Hyperoliidae
- Genus: Acanthixalus; Laurent, 1944

Type species
- Hyperolius spinosus Buchholz and Peters, 1875

Species
- Acanthixalus sonjae; Acanthixalus spinosus

= Acanthixalus =

Genus of amphibians

Acanthixalus, commonly known as African wart frogs, is a genus of frogs in the family Hyperoliidae. They occur in the rainforests of Western and Central Africa, from Ivory Coast to Congo.

== Species ==
The genus Acanthixalus contains two species:

- Acanthixalus sonjae Rödel, Kosuch, Veith, and Ernst, 2003
- Acanthixalus spinosus (Buchholz and Peters, 1875)

== Description ==
Both species are very similar in their size and appearance. The only significant morphological difference between then is the wider relative head width in males of A. sonjae compared to A. spinosus. Average adult size is about 35 mm (1.4 in) in snout–vent length, with largest individuals nearly 39 mm (1.5 in) SVL. Males and females are similar in size, but males have a pair of elongate gular glands, larger discs on toes and fingers, and a large number of tarsal spines.

== Ecology and behaviour ==
Acanthixalus live in water-filled cavities of living trees and on tree trunks, from near the ground level to about 5 m above the ground. Acanthixalus have been found in a variety of wooded habitats: secondary and primary forests, both dry and swampy, as well as from a cacao plantation; the main habitat requirement is the presence of large, water-filled cavities.

The tadpoles develop in the cavities. The development time is relatively long, three months or more. While A. spinosus tadpoles are detritivores, those of A. sonjae seem to thrive better with arthropod diet; cannibalism has not been observed.

Both species appear to be mute. It has been speculated that they use olfactory orientation for finding mates instead.
