= Liua shihi =

Conservation status
- Least Concern (IUCN 3.1)

Scientific classification
- Kingdom: Animalia
- Phylum: Chordata
- Class: Amphibia
- Order: Urodela
- Family: Hynobiidae
- Genus: Liua
- Species: L. shihi

Binomial name
- Liua shihi (Liu, 1950)

Synonyms
- Ranodon shihi (Liu, 1950)

Species of amphibian

Liua shihi, the Wushan salamander, is a species of salamander in the family Hynobiidae, and is endemic to China. Its natural habitats are subtropical or tropical moist lowland forests, subtropical or tropical moist montane forests, rivers, and freshwater marshes. It is threatened by habitat loss.
