= Morerella =

Scientific classification
- Kingdom: Animalia
- Phylum: Chordata
- Class: Amphibia
- Order: Anura
- Family: Hyperoliidae
- Genus: Morerella; Rödel, Kosuch, Grafe, Boistel & Veith, 2009

Genus of amphibians

Morerella is a genus of frogs belonging to the family Hyperoliidae.

The species of this genus are found in Western Central Africa.

== Species ==
Species:

- Morerella cyanophthalma Rödel, Assemian, Kouamé, Tohé & Perret, 2009
