= Chrysobatrachus =

Conservation status
- Endangered (IUCN 3.1)

Scientific classification
- Kingdom: Animalia
- Phylum: Chordata
- Class: Amphibia
- Order: Anura
- Family: Hyperoliidae
- Genus: Chrysobatrachus; Laurent, 1951
- Species: C. cupreonitens

Binomial name
- Chrysobatrachus cupreonitens Laurent, 1951

Genus of amphibians

Chrysobatrachus is a genus of frogs in the family Hyperoliidae. It is monotypic, being represented by the single species, Chrysobatrachus cupreonitens. It is endemic to the Itombwe Mountains in the eastern Democratic Republic of the Congo.

Chrysobatrachus cupreonitens is a species of montane grasslands, occurring at elevations of 2,400–3,000 m (7,900–9,800 ft) above sea level. During the dry season, it has been recorded in marshes and streams, grasses and heathers. The marshes get flooded during the rainy season. Reproduction takes place in pools of water, as evidenced by calling males and pairs in amplexus.

The species is considered "Endangered" because of its relatively small range and threats to its habitat from grazing, agriculture and mining.
