= Indian flying frog =

Conservation status
- Least Concern (IUCN 3.1)

Scientific classification
- Kingdom: Animalia
- Phylum: Chordata
- Class: Amphibia
- Order: Anura
- Family: Ranidae
- Genus: Pterorana; Kiyasetuo & Khare, 1986
- Species: P. khare

Binomial name
- Pterorana khare Kiyasetuo & Khare, 1986

Species of amphibian

The Indian flying frog (Pterorana khare) is a species of frog in the family Ranidae. It is the only species in the monotypic genus Pterorana. It is found in India and Myanmar but extirpated in Nepal. Its natural habitats are subtropical or tropical moist lowland forests, subtropical or tropical moist montane forests, and rivers. The species was discovered by M.Khare and Kiyasetuo in 1986.

The main feature of this frog is the skin or flaps hanging down on both sides of its body. When jumping, it stretches this skin, so that it can float in the air for a little longer. Hence its English name is flying frog.
