= Liua =

Scientific classification
- Kingdom: Animalia
- Phylum: Chordata
- Class: Amphibia
- Order: Urodela
- Family: Hynobiidae
- Subfamily: Hynobiinae
- Genus: Liua; Zhao and Hu, 1983

Species
- Liua shihi; Liua tsinpaensis

Genus of salamanders

Liua is a genus of salamanders (common name: Sichuan salamanders) in the family Hynobiidae, endemic to China.

== Species ==
The genus contains only two species:

- Liua shihi (Liu, 1950) — Wushan salamander (synonym: Ranodon shihi)
- Liua tsinpaensis (Liu and Hu, 1966) — Tsinpa salamander (synonym: Ranodon tsinpaensis)
