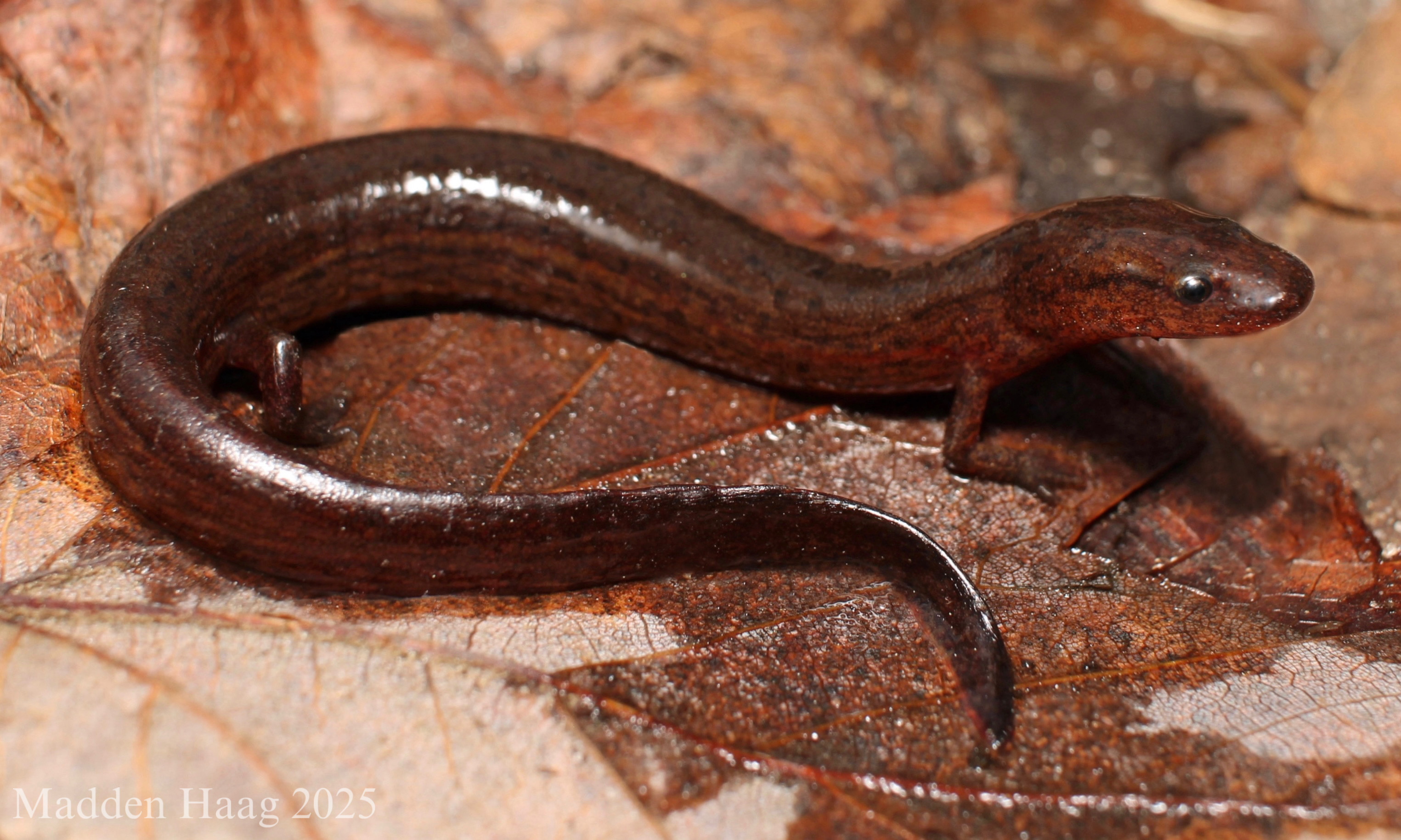
- Many lined salamander (Stereochilus marginatus)

Conservation status
- Least Concern (IUCN 3.1)

Scientific classification
- Kingdom: Animalia
- Phylum: Chordata
- Class: Amphibia
- Order: Urodela
- Family: Plethodontidae
- Subfamily: Hemidactyliinae
- Genus: Stereochilus; Cope, 1869
- Species: S. marginatus

Binomial name
- Stereochilus marginatus (Hallowell, 1856)

= Many-lined salamander =

Species of salamander

The many-lined salamander (Stereochilus marginatus) is a species of salamander in the family Plethodontidae. It is the only species of the monotypic genus Stereochilus. It is endemic to the United States.

== Physical description ==
Stereochilus marginatus are small salamanders, generally ranging from 6.4 to 11.4 cm (2.5 to 4.5 in) in overall length, with a thin, sharp head and a tail shorter than average salamanders in the plethodontids. According to Dirk J. Stevenson, "the basic color pattern is brown or dull yellow with narrow, alternating light and dark longitudinal lines along the lower sides of the body that break up on the tail into a netlike pattern."

== Habitat and distribution ==
This species of salamander is commonly found in the lower Atlantic Coastal Plain of Georgia. It occurs on the Atlantic coastal plain from northeastern Florida to southeastern Virginia. The species is "unusually aquatic for a plethodontid," inhabiting "forested swamps fringing slow-moving blackwater streams, shallow ditches choked with aquatic vegetation, and mucky seepage areas." Stereochilus marginatus is also likely to be found under natural cover, such as Sphagnum moss or the decaying remains of leaves and other natural materials left behind in riverbeds; they can also sometimes be found underneath the remains of trees in drier environments.

== Life history ==
Stereochilus marginatus are one of about 35 species of Plethodontidae that lay aquatic eggs that hatch as swimming larvae. The larvae period lasts around 1–2 years. It generally takes 3–4 years to mature for breeding, and males reach sexual maturity earlier than females. Unfortunately, not much is known about their expected life-span.

== Diet and interspecific interactions ==
Both adults and larvae's diets tend to consist of small invertebrates, including arthropods and worms.

It is common to find Desmognathus auriculatus (southern dusky salamanders) and Pseudotriton montanus (mud salamanders) in the same environments. Predators of the Stereochilus marginatus may include larger aquatic fauna or insects.
