= Cryptothylax =

Scientific classification
- Domain: Eukaryota
- Kingdom: Animalia
- Phylum: Chordata
- Class: Amphibia
- Order: Anura
- Family: Hyperoliidae
- Genus: Cryptothylax; Laurent & Combaz, 1950

Diversity
- 2 species

Genus of amphibians

Cryptothylax is a small genus of hyperoliid frogs found in the Congo Basin.

== Species ==
There are two species in this genus:

- Cryptothylax greshoffii (Schilthuis, 1889)
- Cryptothylax minutus Laurent, 1976
