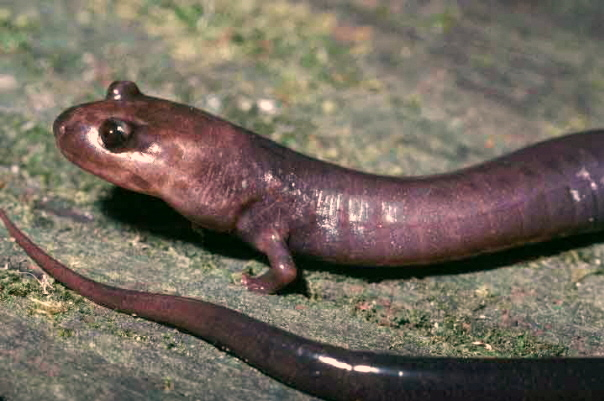

Conservation status
- Endangered (IUCN 3.1)

- Threatened (ESA)

Scientific classification
- Kingdom: Animalia
- Phylum: Chordata
- Class: Amphibia
- Order: Urodela
- Family: Plethodontidae
- Genus: Phaeognathus; Highton, 1961
- Species: P. hubrichti

Binomial name
- Phaeognathus hubrichti Highton, 1961
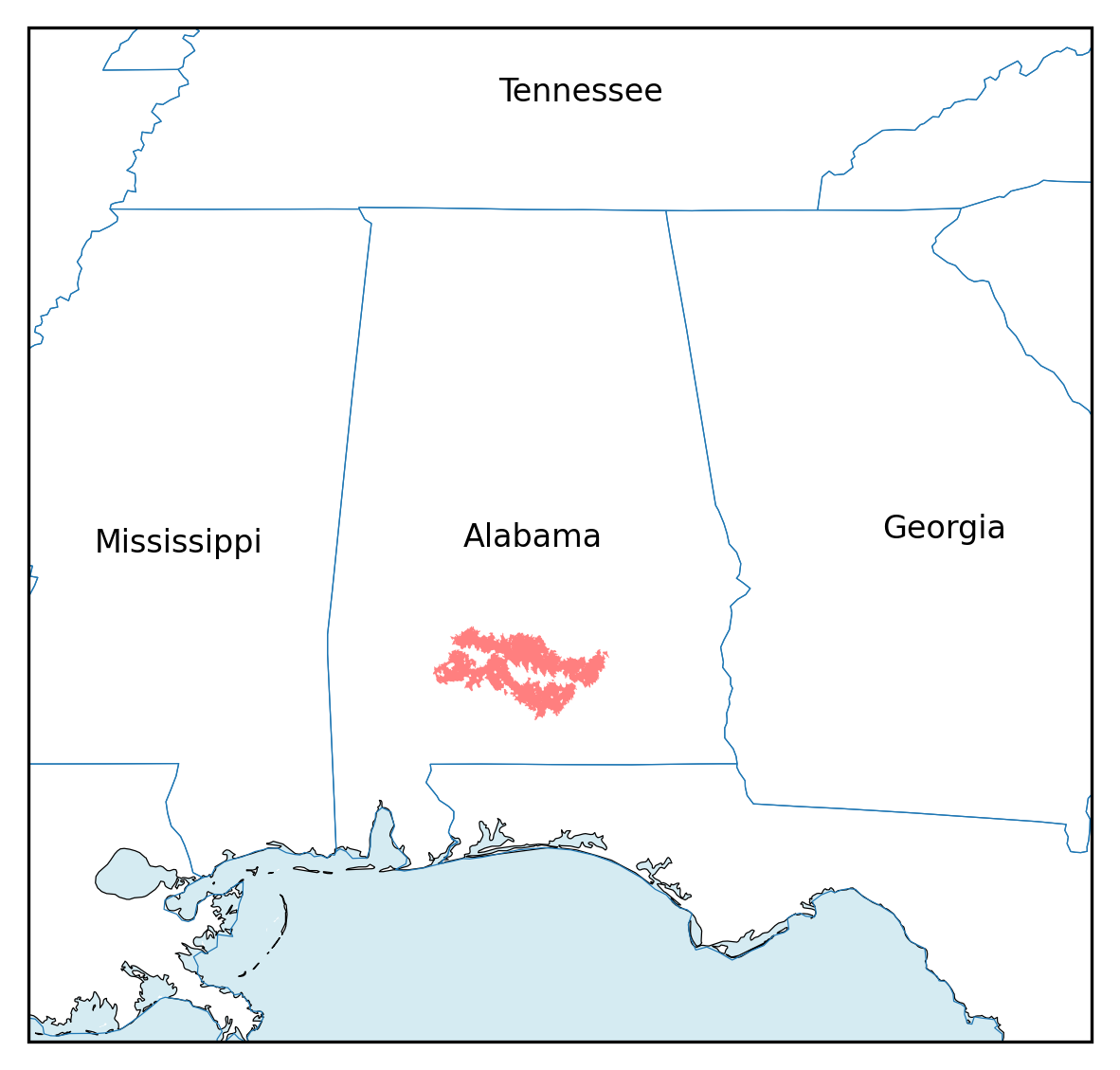

= Red Hills salamander =

Species of salamander

The Red Hills salamander (Phaeognathus hubrichti) is a fairly large, terrestrial salamander growing to about 255 millimetres (10 in). Its body color is gray to brownish without markings, and its limbs are relatively short. It is the official state amphibian of Alabama, the state it is endemic to. It is the only species in the genus Phaeognathus.

== Habitat ==
The range of the Red Hills salamander is restricted to a narrow belt of two geological formations, approximately 60 miles (97 km) long (east to west) and between 10 and 25 miles (40 km) wide (north to south), in southern Alabama. These formations are included within the Red Hills physiographic province of the Coastal Plain. The range is limited on the east by the Conecuh River and on the west by the Alabama River (Jordan and Mount 1975). Currently, there are eight published locality records from Butler, Conecuh, Covington, Crenshaw, and Monroe Counties (Brandon 1965; Schwaner and Mount 1970).

This species inhabits burrows located on the slopes of moist, cool mesic ravines shaded by an overstory of predominately hardwood trees. These areas are underlain by a subsurface siltstone stratum containing many crevices, root tracings, and solution channels which are utilized by the Salamander. The topsoil in typical habitat is sandy loam.

Data for comparison of habitat changes are available from two studies; one by French (1976) and one by Dodd (1989). Ninety-one of the same sites were surveyed in both studies (each study also surveyed additional sites not visited by the other study). Of these 91 sites, 54 appeared similar to earlier descriptions, 19 had improved habitat conditions, and 18 were adversely affected by timber cutting since 1976. Of the 19 sites judged to have improved, 18 had been cleared of trees or had been selectively cut prior to French's survey but have since regrown a full tree canopy. (None of these improved sites had been mechanically prepared for replanting.) In addition to these 91 sites, 14 others examined in the latest survey were damaged by timber cutting; their status in 1976, however, was unknown.

== Conservation status ==
P. hubrichti is considered a threatened species. Primary threats to this species include its restricted range, loss of habitat, a low reproductive rate, and a limited capability of dispersal. Of the approximately 63,000 acres (250 km^{2}) of remaining habitat, about 60 percent is currently owned or leased by paper companies which primarily use a clear-cut system of forest management. This technique, coupled with mechanical site preparation for replanting, appears to completely destroy the habitat for the Red Hills salamander. However, as noted above, the Red Hills salamander prefers hardwood sites which are not managed using a clear-cut system. The clear-cut system is used primarily in pine management. Pine sites are not conducive as Red Hills salamander habitat. NatureServe considers the species Imperiled.

In 2010, The Nature Conservancy acquired 1,786 acres (7.23 km^{2}) of land in southwest Alabama in an effort to provide sufficient habitat to support the survival of the species. The land will eventually be transferred for recreational use to the state of Alabama. Following acquisitions in 2020, the amount of protected habitat in the Red Hills physiographic province within Alabama reached over 11,000 acres (45 km^{2}).
