= Dasypops =

Conservation status
- Vulnerable (IUCN 3.1)

Scientific classification
- Kingdom: Animalia
- Phylum: Chordata
- Class: Amphibia
- Order: Anura
- Family: Microhylidae
- Subfamily: Gastrophryninae
- Genus: Dasypops; Miranda-Ribeiro, 1924
- Species: D. schirchi

Binomial name
- Dasypops schirchi Miranda-Ribeiro, 1924

Genus of amphibians

Dasypops is a genus of frog in the family Microhylidae. It is monotypic, being represented by the single species, the Rio Mutum frog (Dasypops schirchi). It is endemic to the coastal plain of Espírito Santo and Bahia states of eastern Brazil. Its natural habitats are lowland forests, including secondary forests and forest edges. It is an explosive breeder that breeds in temporary pools. It is potentially threatened by habitat loss.
