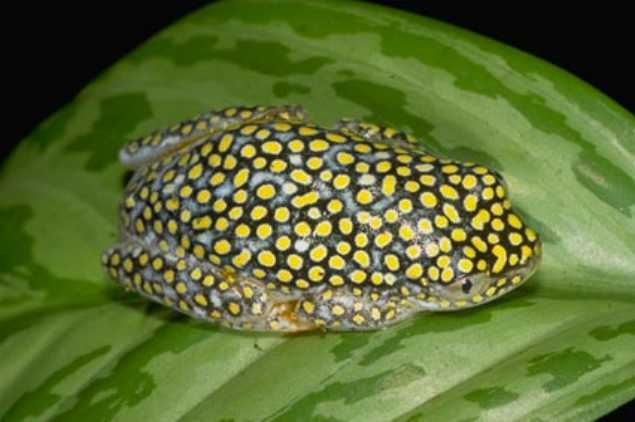
- Heterixalus alboguttatus

Scientific classification
- Kingdom: Animalia
- Phylum: Chordata
- Class: Amphibia
- Order: Anura
- Clade: Afrobatrachia
- Family: Hyperoliidae; Laurent, 1943

Genera
- 17 genera (see text)

= Hyperoliidae =

Family of frogs

The Hyperoliidae, or sedge frogs and bush frogs, are a large family of small to medium-sized, brightly colored frogs which contain more than 250 species in 19 genera. Seventeen genera are native to sub-Saharan Africa. In addition, the monotypic genus Tachycnemis occurs on the Seychelles Islands, and the genus Heterixalus (currently 10 species) is endemic to Madagascar.

Hyperoliids range from 1.5 to 8 cm (0.59 to 3.15 in) in body length. Many species have smooth, brightly patterned skin that almost looks enameled.

Most hyperoliids are arboreal, but some are terrestrial, including several Kassina species that move by walking or running rather than hopping. Diets vary widely, with examples including Paracassina, which specializes in snails, and Afrixalus fornasini, the only terrestrial frog known to prey on eggs of other species of anurans.

Breeding in this family begins at the start of the rainy season, when hyperoliids congregate at breeding sites. Most hyperoliids lay their eggs in water, although foam nesting, tree-hole breeding, and laying eggs in vegetation above water are all known behaviors. Afrixalus builds leaf nests for its eggs, by folding and gluing the edges of the leaves. Tadpoles are pond type larvae with large dorsal fins on their tails.

No fossil hyperoliids are known.

== Classification ==
As of mid-2022, there are 17 genera with 224 species, more than half of them in the very species-rich Hyperolius: The genera are divided between three subfamilies, with three genera unplaced.

- Subfamily Acanthixalinae Dubois, Ohler & Pyron, 2021 (2 species)
  - Acanthixalus - African wart frogs (2 species)
- Subfamily Hyperoliinae Laurent, 1943 (196 species)
  - Afrixalus - banana frogs (35 species)
  - Congolius - Congo frog (1 species)
  - Cryptothylax - wax frogs (2 species)
  - Heterixalus - Madagascan reed frogs (11 species)
  - Hyperolius - African reed frogs (143 species)
  - Kassinula - clicking frog (1 species)
  - Morerella - blue-eyed frog (1 species)
  - Opisthothylax - grey-eyed frog (1 species)
  - Tachycnemis - Seychelles Islands frog (1 species)
- Subfamily Kassininae Laurent, 1972 (23 sp.)
  - Hylambates - African striped frogs (5 species; formerly Phlyctimantis)
  - Kassina - running frogs (15 species)
  - Paracassina - common striped frogs (2 species)
  - Semnodactylus - Weal's frog (1 species)
- Subfamily incertae sedis
  - Arlequinus - Mebebque frog (1 species)
  - Callixalus - African painted frog (1 species)
  - Chrysobatrachus - Itombwe golden frog (1 species)
