= Bom Jesus =

Bom Jesus may refer to:

== Places ==
=== Angola ===
- Bom Jesus, Ícolo e Bengo, a commune in Icolo e Bengo, Luanda

=== Brazil ===
- Bom Jesus, a district in Pirenópolis
- Bom Jesus, Paraíba, a city in Paraíba
- Bom Jesus, Piauí, a city in Piauí
- Bom Jesus, Rio Grande do Norte, a city in Rio Grande do Norte
- Bom Jesus, Rio Grande do Sul, a city in Rio Grande do Sul
- Bom Jesus, Santa Catarina, a city in Santa Catarina
- Bom Jesus, Porto Alegre, a region of the city of Porto Alegre
- Bom Jesus, a beach in Arroio do Sal, Rio Grande do Sul

Also:

- Bom Jesus do Amparo, a city in Minas Gerais
- Bom Jesus do Galho, a city in Minas Gerais
- Bom Jesus de Goiás, a city in Goiás
- Bom Jesus do Itabapoana, a city in Rio of Janeiro
- Bom Jesus da Lapa, a city in Bahia
- Bom Jesus do Norte, a city in Espírito Santo
- Bom Jesus do Oeste, a city in Santa Catarina
- Bom Jesus da Penha, a city in Minas Gerais
- Bom Jesus dos Perdões, a city in São Paulo
- Bom Jesus das Selvas, a city in Maranhão
- Bom Jesus da Serra, a city in Bahia
- Bom Jesus do Sul, a city in Paraná
- Bom Jesus do Tocantins, Pará, a city in Pará
- Bom Jesus do Tocantins, Tocantins, a city in Tocantins
- Córrego do Bom Jesus, a city in Minas Gerais
- Pirapora do Bom Jesus, a city in São Paulo
- Ponte Alta do Bom Jesus, a city in Tocantins

== Other uses ==
- Basilica of Bom Jesus, a minor basilica in Goa, India
- Bom Jesus (ship), a Portuguese nau that set sail from Lisbon in 1533 and was lost off the coast of Namibia
- Bom Jesus do Monte, a sanctuary in Braga, Portugal
