= BR-393 (Brazil highway) =

Highway in Brazil

BR-393
- Rodovia Lúcio Meira

Route information
- Length: 444.8 km (276.4 mi)

Major junctions
- northeast end: Cachoeiro de Itapemirim, Espírito Santo
- southwest end: Barra Mansa, Rio de Janeiro

Location
- Country: Brazil

Highway system
- Highways in Brazil; Federal

BR-393, a.k.a. Rodovia Lúcio Meira is a federal highway that begins in Cachoeiro de Itapemirim, Espírito Santo and ends in Barra Mansa, Rio de Janeiro. The highway also serves the municipalities of Barra Mansa, Volta Redonda, Barra do Piraí, Vassouras, Paraíba do Sul, Três Rios, Sapucaia, Rio de Janeiro, Além Paraíba, Volta Grande, Estrela Dalva, Pirapetinga, Santo Antônio de Pádua, São José de Ubá, Itaperuna, Bom Jesus do Itabapoana, Bom Jesus do Norte, São José do Calçado, Apiacá, Mimoso do Sul, Muqui, Cachoeiro de Itapemirim in Espírito Santo. Oficialmente a rodovia não chega a cidade de Cachoeiro do Itapemirim,sendo Denominada com Vários nomes,tais como primeiramente como antiga Rio-Bahia, rodovia do Aço, e posteriormente Lucio Meira a partir do município de Barra Mansa ao distrito de Jamapará, Adentrando em Além Paraíba no estado de Minas Gerais Coincidindo com a BR-116 até a cidade de Pirapetinga, após isso Seu trecho é coincidente a RJ-186 ligando os municípios de Santos Antônio do Pádua a Bom Jesus do Itabapoana. De Bom Jesus do Norte, no Estado do Espírito Santo, até a R. Principal, 1 - Conceição do Muqui, ela se torna a ES-494; A partir daí, até a Igreja Maranatá, em Conceição do Muqui, ela se torna a ES-391, nesse pequeno trecho; a partir daí, ela se denomina de novo BR 393/ES-391 até um pouco antes do Mercado do Edoires, na zona rural de Mimoso do Sul; daí para frente ela volta a se denominar BR 393 até chegar em Blocos do Brasil Rep, Marbrasa, Cachoeiro de Itapemirim.
