= Euparkerella robusta =

Conservation status
- Vulnerable (IUCN 3.1)

Scientific classification
- Kingdom: Animalia
- Phylum: Chordata
- Class: Amphibia
- Order: Anura
- Family: Strabomantidae
- Genus: Euparkerella
- Species: E. robusta

Binomial name
- Euparkerella robusta Izecksohn, 1988

Species of frog

Euparkerella robusta is a species of frog in the family Strabomantidae. It is endemic to the state of Espírito Santo in southeastern Brazil. It has been recorded from the municipality of Mimoso do Sul (type locality) and the neighboring Atílio Vivacqua. Common name Izecksohn's Guanabara frog has been proposed for it.

== Description ==
The body is robust. Adult males measure 17.2–21.5 mm (0.7–0.8 in) in snout–vent length. It is a large member of its genus; it differs from the other large species, Euparkerella tridactyla, by its longer fingers.

The male advertisement call consists of a single note comprising 5–8 long pulses repeated periodically. The pulses are relatively long and have a whistle-like character (as opposed to short snaps in other Euparkerella). The call duration is 1.3–2.2 seconds and the dominant frequency is 2.9–3.2 kHz.

== Habitat and conservation ==
Euparkerella robusta occurs in leaf litter in primary and secondary forest. Development is direct (i.e., there is no free-living larval stage).

It is reasonably common at the type locality. Habitat loss caused by agriculture, logging, and human settlement is a concern. At time of the most recent IUCN assessment, it was not known to occur in any protected area. However, the locality in Atílio Vivacqua, Serra das Torres, could overlap with the Serra das Torres Natural Monument.
