= Melin (surname) =

Melin is a surname.

== Geographical distribution ==
As of 2014, 28.6% of all known bearers of the surname Melin were residents of Sweden (frequency 1:1,616), 25.5% of France (1:12,255), 13.2% of the United States (1:127,967), 7.1% of Chile (1:11,721), 3.7% of Argentina (1:54,659), 3.2% of Brazil (1:297,689), 2.4% of Belgium (1:22,767), 2.1% of Denmark (1:12,351), 1.9% of Mexico (1:309,524), 1.6% of Canada (1:105,438), 1.5% of Russia (1:446,722) and 1.2% of Indonesia (1:516,597).

In Sweden, the frequency of the surname was higher than national average (1:1,616) in the following counties:

1. Gotland County (1:696)
2. Västernorrland County (1:760)
3. Gävleborg County (1:889)
4. Uppsala County (1:945)
5. Jönköping County (1:988)
6. Dalarna County (1:1,102)
7. Örebro County (1:1,262)
8. Värmland County (1:1,380)
9. Blekinge County (1:1,387)

In Chile, the frequency of the surname was higher than national average (1:11,721) in the following regions:

1. Araucanía Region (1:1,525)
2. Santiago (1:11,168)

In France, the frequency of the surname was higher than national average (1:12,255) in the following regions:

1. Saint Pierre and Miquelon (1:1,280)
2. Hauts-de-France (1:6,609)
3. Bourgogne-Franche-Comté (1:7,535)
4. Grand Est (1:8,016)
5. Nouvelle-Aquitaine (1:8,799)
6. Centre-Val de Loire (1:10,136)
7. Auvergne-Rhône-Alpes (1:11,307)

In Denmark, the frequency of the surname was higher than national average (1:12,351) in the following regions:

1. Central Denmark Region (1:7,146)
2. Region Zealand (1:11,765)

In Belgium, the frequency of the surname was higher than national average (1:22,767) only in one region: Wallonia (1:8,091).

== People ==
- Berith Melin (1918–1977), All-American Girls Professional Baseball League player
- Björn Melin (born 1981), Swedish professional ice hockey player
- Domingo Melín (dead 1880), Mapuche chief
- Douglas Melin (1895–1946), Swedish zoologist and Olympic athlete
- John Melin, Swedish actor
- Mertil Melin (born 1945), Swedish Army General
- Olof Melin (1861–1940), Swedish colonel and the creator of Melin Shorthand
- Roger Melin (born 1956), Swedish ice hockey player and head coach
- Sten Melin (born 1957), Swedish composer
- Ulrika Melin (1767–1834), Swedish textile artist
