= D. minutus =

D. minutus may refer to:

- Dendrophryniscus minutus, a toad species found in Bolivia, Brazil, Colombia, Ecuador, French Guiana, Guyana, Peru, Suriname and possibly Venezuela
- Dendropsophus minutus, the lesser treefrog or ranita amarilla común, a frog species found in Argentina, Bolivia, Brazil, Colombia, Ecuador, French Guiana, Guyana, Paraguay, Peru, Suriname, Trinidad and Tobago, Uruguay and Venezuela

== See also ==
- Minuta
