= Dendrophryniscus stawiarskyi =

Conservation status
- Data Deficient (IUCN 3.1)

Scientific classification
- Kingdom: Animalia
- Phylum: Chordata
- Class: Amphibia
- Order: Anura
- Family: Bufonidae
- Genus: Dendrophryniscus
- Species: D. stawiarskyi

Binomial name
- Dendrophryniscus stawiarskyi Izecksohn, 1994

Species of amphibian

Dendrophryniscus stawiarskyi is a species of toad in the family Bufonidae. It is endemic to Brazil and only known from its type locality, Bituruna in the Paraná state. Its natural habitat is humid rainforest where it occurs in the forest leaf-litter. It is threatened by habitat loss.
