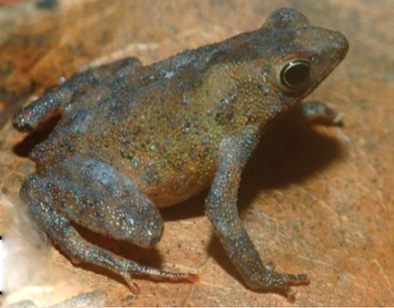

Conservation status
- Least Concern (IUCN 3.1)

Scientific classification
- Kingdom: Animalia
- Phylum: Chordata
- Class: Amphibia
- Order: Anura
- Family: Bufonidae
- Genus: Amazophrynella
- Species: A. bokermanni

Binomial name
- Amazophrynella bokermanni (Izecksohn, 1994)

Synonyms
- Dendrophryniscus bokermanni Izecksohn, 1994 "1993"

= Amazophrynella bokermanni =

Species of amphibian

Amazophrynella bokermanni is a species of toad in the family Bufonidae. It is endemic to Brazil and only known from the region of its type locality, the Amazonas state. Its natural habitats are old-growth forests where it occurs in leaf-litter. The eggs are laid on aerial roots over temporary pools where the tadpoles then develop.

The species is threatened by habitat loss. It occurs in the Rio Trombetas Biological Reserve.
