= Dendrophryniscus carvalhoi =

Conservation status
- Endangered (IUCN 3.1)

Scientific classification
- Kingdom: Animalia
- Phylum: Chordata
- Class: Amphibia
- Order: Anura
- Family: Bufonidae
- Genus: Dendrophryniscus
- Species: D. carvalhoi

Binomial name
- Dendrophryniscus carvalhoi Izecksohn, 1994

Species of amphibian

Dendrophryniscus carvalhoi is a species of toad in the family Bufonidae.

It is endemic to Brazil. Its natural habitat is subtropical or tropical moist lowland forests. It is threatened by habitat loss.
