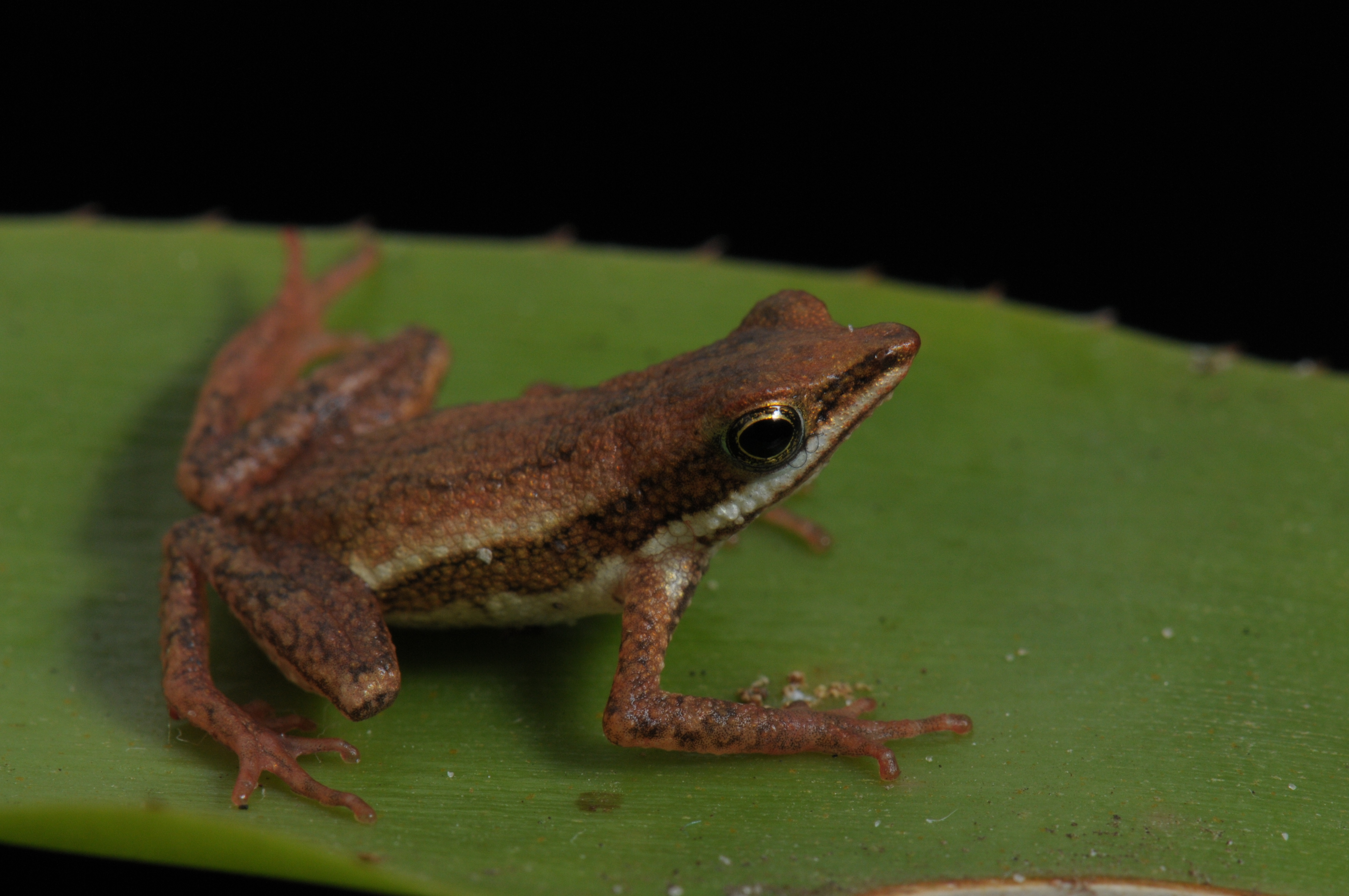

Conservation status
- Least Concern (IUCN 3.1)

Scientific classification
- Kingdom: Animalia
- Phylum: Chordata
- Class: Amphibia
- Order: Anura
- Family: Bufonidae
- Genus: Dendrophryniscus
- Species: D. leucomystax

Binomial name
- Dendrophryniscus leucomystax Izecksohn, 1968

= Dendrophryniscus leucomystax =

Species of amphibian

Dendrophryniscus leucomystax is a species of toad in the family Bufonidae. It is endemic to southern and southeastern Brazil and occurs in coastal forests of Rio de Janeiro, São Paulo, and Santa Catarina states. It is a very common species living in secondary and primary forests on leaves near the ground and in bogs. Breeding takes place in rain pools on the ground. It is threatened by habitat loss caused by clear-cutting of forests and large-scale livestock farming.
