= E. robusta =

E. robusta may refer to:

- Eonycteris robusta, the Philippine dawn bat, a bat species found in the Philippines
- Eucalyptus robusta, the swamp mahogany, swamp messmate or swamp stringybark, a tree species native to eastern Australia
- Euodia robusta, a plant species found in Malaysia and Singapore
- Euparkerella robusta, a frog species endemic to Brazil
- Eurycea robusta, the Blanco blind salamander, an aquatic, lungless salamander species native to the United States

== See also ==
- Robusta
