= Bom Jesus do Itabapoana =

Coordinates: 21°08′02″S 41°40′48″W

- Municipality
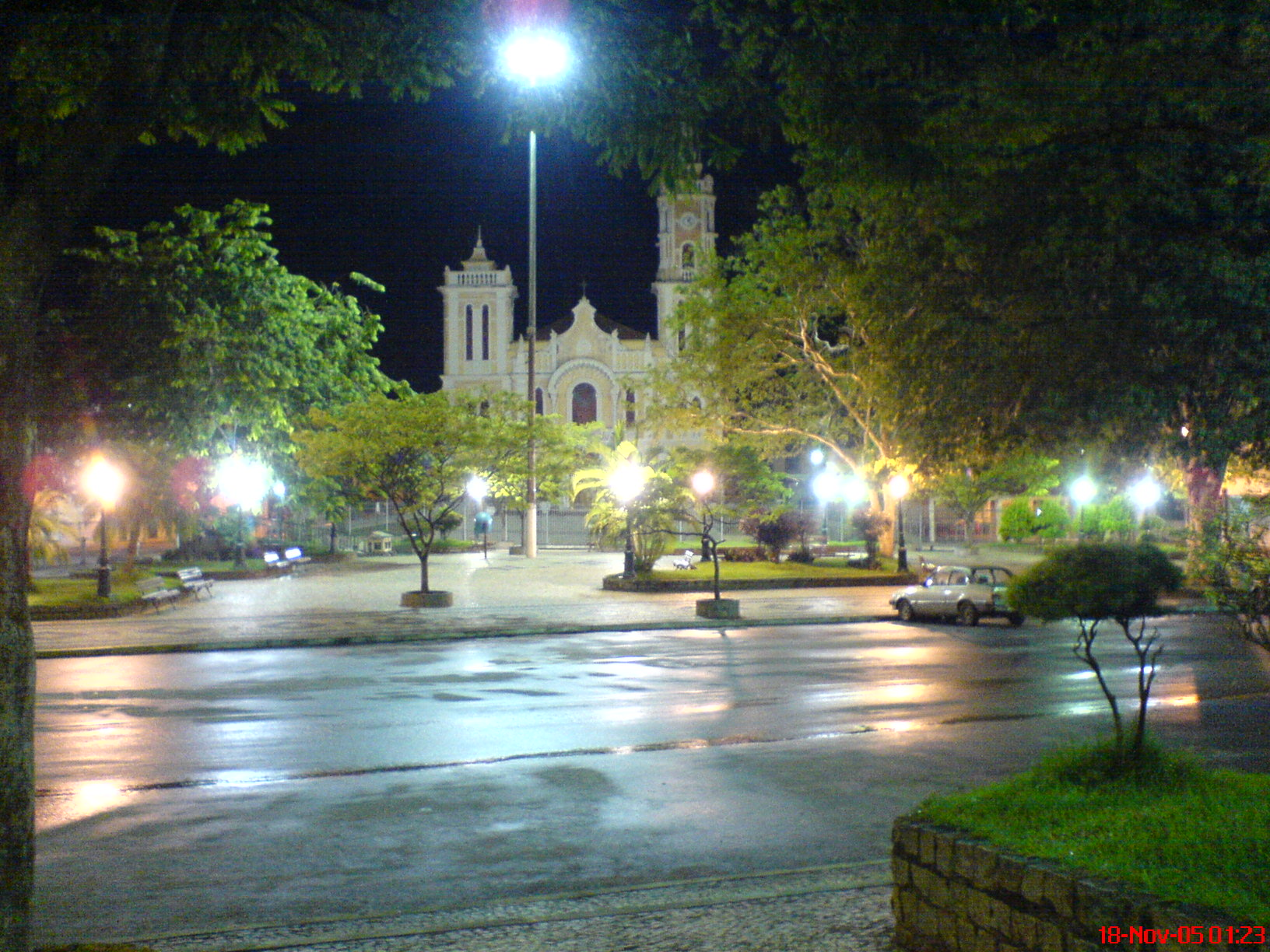
- Town's Mother Parish

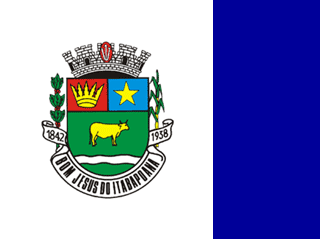
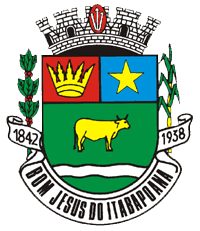
- Flag Coat of arms

- Location of Bom Jesus do Itabapoana
- Country: Brazil
- Region: Southeast
- State: Rio de Janeiro
- Mesoregion: Noroeste Fluminense
- Microregion: Itaperuana
- Founded: 1939

Government
  - Mayor: Maria das Graças Ferreira Motta (PMDB)

Area
  - Total: 598.401 km^{2} (231.044 sq mi)
- Elevation: 88 m (289 ft)

Population (2022)
  - Total: 35,173
  - Density: 58.778/km^{2} (152.24/sq mi)
- Time zone: UTC-3 (UTC-3)
  - Summer (DST): UTC-2 (UTC-2)
- Website: Official website

Bom Jesus do Itabapoana (Portuguese pronunciation: [ˈbõ(w) ʒeˈzu(j)z dwitɐbapuˈɐ̃nɐ]) is a municipality in the Brazilian state of Rio de Janeiro. It had a population of 35,173 as of 2022, and has an area of 596.6 km^{2}. It was founded in 1939, after being separated from the municipality of Itaperuna.

== Geography ==
The northern border of Bom Jesus do Itabapoana is delimited by the Itabapoana River, which divides the states of Rio de Janeiro and Espírito Santo. The city is located 251 km in a straight line from the state capital Rio de Janeiro. Its neighbouring municipalities are:

- São José do Calçado (ES) – north
- Bom Jesus do Norte (ES) – north
- Apiacá (ES) – north
- Mimoso do Sul (ES) – northeast
- Campos dos Goytacazes – east and southeast
- Itaperuna – south and southeast
- Natividade – west
- Varre-Sai – northwest
- Guaçuí (ES) – northwest
