= Lucas Furtado =

Brazilian footballer (born 2005)

Personal information
- Full name: Lucas Furtado dos Santos
- Date of birth: 9 March 2005 (age 21)
- Place of birth: Muqui, Brazil
- Height: 1.97 m (6 ft 6 in)
- Position: Goalkeeper

Team information
- Current team: Vitória de Guimarães
- Number: 98

Youth career
- 2019–2025: Flamengo

Senior career*
Years	Team	Apps	(Gls)
2024–2025	Flamengo	0	(0)
2025–	Vitória de Guimarães B	3	(0)
2026–	Vitória de Guimarães	2	(0)
- * Club domestic league appearances and goals as of 13:46, 7 November 2026 (UTC)

Lucas Furtado dos Santos (born 9 March 2005) is a Brazilian professional footballer who plays as a goalkeeper for Portuguese club Vitória de Guimarães.

== Club career ==
=== Flamengo ===
Furtado was born in Muqui and raised in Cachoeiro de Itapemirim, both in the state of Espírito Santo. After being voted the best goalkeeper in a youth tournament, he was approached by scouts and sent a video of his training session to several clubs; Flamengo signed him, ahead of Athletico Paranaense and Vasco da Gama. In March 2024, he won the U-20 Copa Libertadores with a 2–1 victory over Boca Juniors; a year later his team defended the trophy against compatriots Palmeiras, with him saving two attempts in the penalty shootout.

In 2025, Furtado's contract was set to expire at the end of the year, and he did not wish to renew. He lost his place in the under-20 team to Léo Nannetti, who played in the shootout win over Barcelona in the Intercontinental Finalíssima.

=== Vitória de Guimarães ===
On 31 August 2025, Furtado signed for Vitória de Guimarães in Portugal on a three-year deal, being assigned to the reserve team in Liga 3. Flamengo retained 50% of any future transfer fee.

Furtado made his first-team debut for Vitória on 17 October 2026, away to fifth-tier ACDR Lamelas in the third round of the Taça de Portugal, and kept a clean sheet in a 1–0 victory. Six days later he made his Primeira Liga debut in a 5–0 win at home to Marítimo, and was praised by manager Tiago Margarido.

== International career ==
Furtado was chosen by the Brazil national under-20 team for the 2025 FIFA U-20 World Cup in Chile. Otávio played each game in goal as the team were eliminated with a draw and two losses.

== Personal life ==
Furtado was inspired by his father, known as Soneca, who wished to be a professional goalkeeper but had to find regular work due to being one of the oldest of ten siblings.
