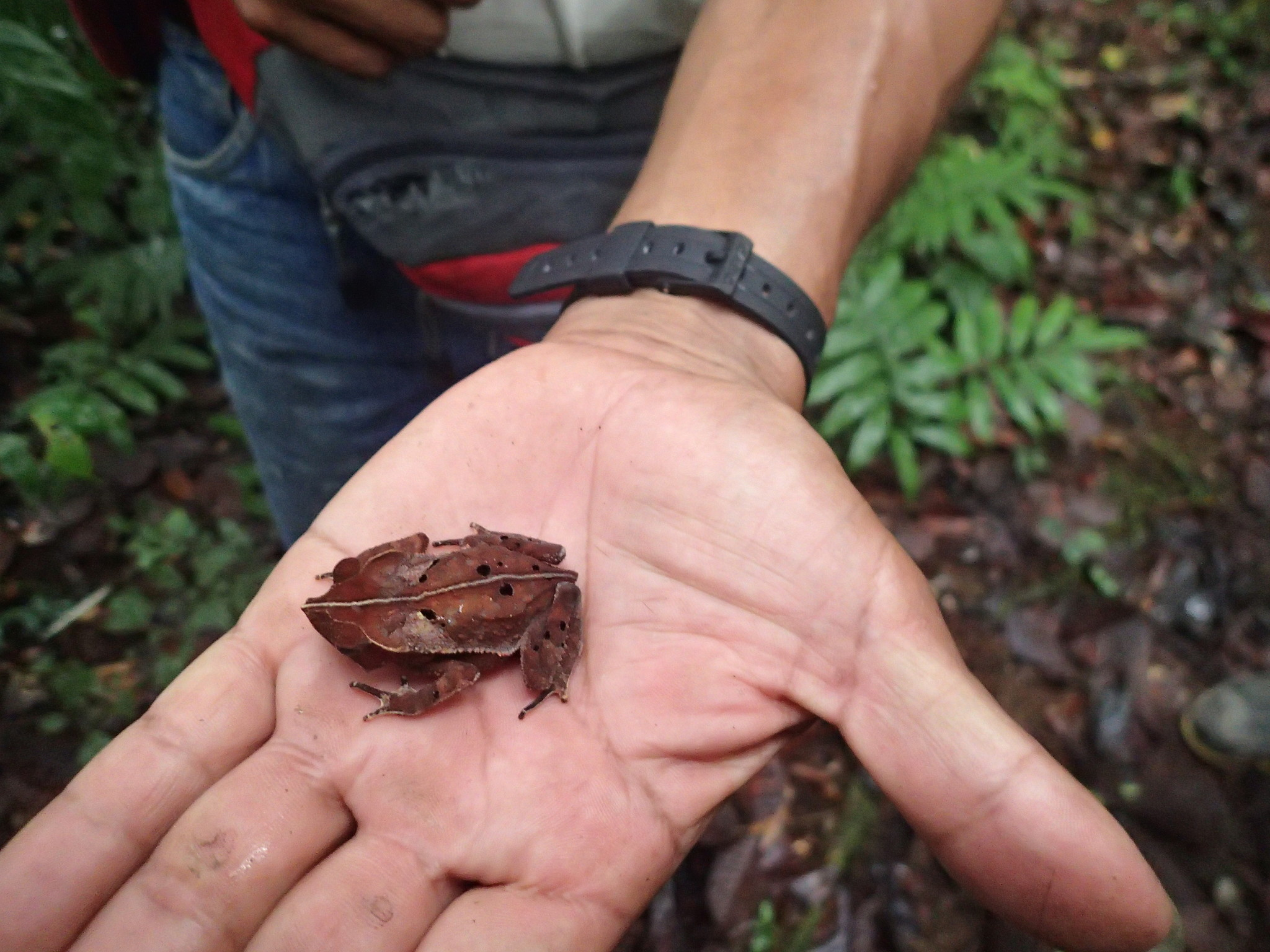

Conservation status
- Least Concern (IUCN 3.1)

Scientific classification
- Kingdom: Animalia
- Phylum: Chordata
- Class: Amphibia
- Order: Anura
- Family: Bufonidae
- Genus: Rhinella
- Species: R. roqueana

Binomial name
- Rhinella roqueana (Melin, 1941)

Synonyms
- Bufo typhonius roqueanus Melin, 1941; Bufo roqueanus Melin, 1941

= Rhinella roqueana =

Species of amphibian

Rhinella roqueana is a species of toad in the family Bufonidae. It is found in northern Peru, eastern Ecuador (Pastaza), Amazonian Colombia (Amazonas and Caquetá Departments), and adjacent western Brazil. Its specific name refers to its type locality, Roque, San Martín Region, Peru. Its taxonomic position is uncertain and it is not clear how to distinguish it from other members in the Rhinella margaritifera group in the area.

== Description ==
Males measure 54–71 mm (2.1–2.8 in) and females 61–81 mm (2.4–3.2 in) in snout–vent length.

== Habitat and conservation ==
It is an uncommon species living in the leaf-litter of tropical lowland rainforest. Habitat loss is a localized threat to this widely distributed species. For example, its type locality is mostly coffee plantation today.
