= Euparkerella cochranae =

Conservation status
- Least Concern (IUCN 3.1)

Scientific classification
- Kingdom: Animalia
- Phylum: Chordata
- Class: Amphibia
- Order: Anura
- Family: Strabomantidae
- Genus: Euparkerella
- Species: E. cochranae

Binomial name
- Euparkerella cochranae Izecksohn, 1988

Species of frog

Euparkerella cochranae is a species of frog in the family Strabomantidae. It is endemic to Brazil. Its natural habitat is subtropical or tropical moist lowland forest. It is threatened by habitat loss.
