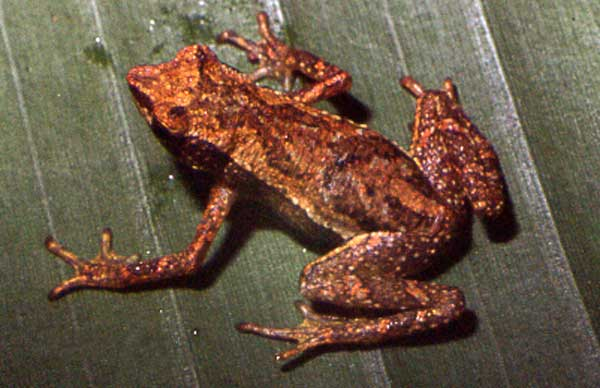

Conservation status
- Least Concern (IUCN 3.1)

Scientific classification
- Kingdom: Animalia
- Phylum: Chordata
- Class: Amphibia
- Order: Anura
- Family: Bufonidae
- Genus: Dendrophryniscus
- Species: D. berthalutzae

Binomial name
- Dendrophryniscus berthalutzae Izecksohn, 1994

= Dendrophryniscus berthalutzae =

Species of amphibian

Dendrophryniscus berthalutzae is a species of toad in the family Bufonidae. It is endemic to southeastern Brazil where it is found in the coastal plain of Santa Catarina and Paraná states.

== Etymology ==
The specific name berthalutzae honors Bertha Lutz, distinguished herpetologist from the National Museum of Brazil and pioneering feminist.

== Description ==
The type series consists of an adult male measuring 20 mm (0.79 in) and an adult female measuring 24 mm (0.94 in) in snout–vent length. Another set of three males and three females shows a size range of 18.0–21.5 mm (0.71–0.85 in) for males and 21.4–23.5 mm (0.84–0.93 in) for females. The head is triangular. The tympanum is absent. The canthus rostralis is marked. The limbs are slender with reduced webbing. The dorsum is granulose with small, scattered tubercles. The coloration is cryptic; the scapular area has an X-mark. The belly is immaculate. The external margin of upper eyelid varies from weakly prominent to prominent.

== Habitat and conservation ==
Its natural habitat humid rainforests at elevations of 80–1,100 m (260–3,610 ft) above sea level. It occurs in leaf litter. It reproduces in bromeliads where the tadpoles develop. Dendrophryniscus berthalutzae is an uncommon species but continues to be collected on regular basis (notice though some specimens first reported as D. berthalutzae actually belong to Dendrophryniscus krausae described in 2008). It is threatened by habitat loss (deforestation).
