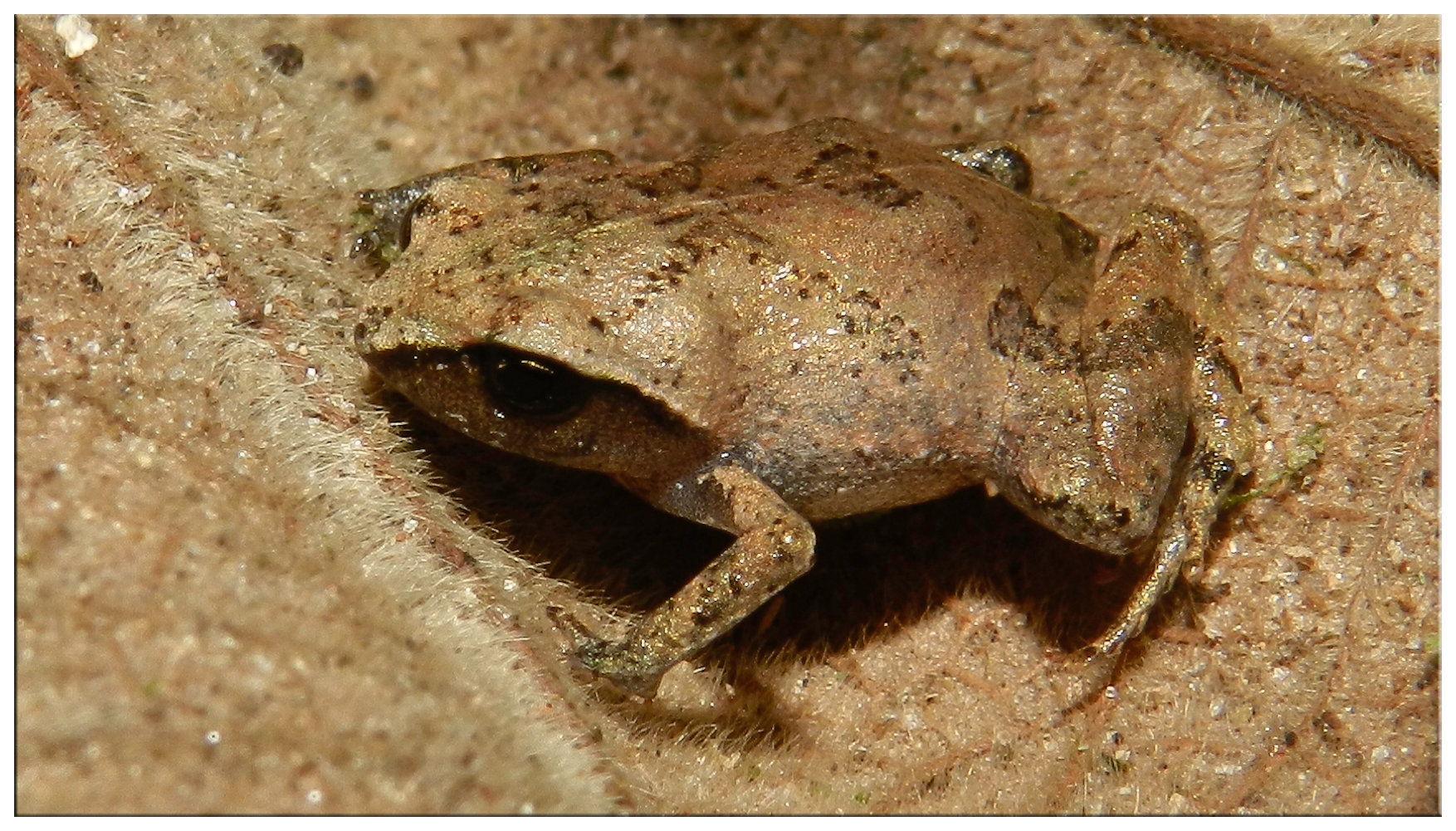

Conservation status
- Least Concern (IUCN 3.1)

Scientific classification
- Kingdom: Animalia
- Phylum: Chordata
- Class: Amphibia
- Order: Anura
- Clade: Brachycephaloidea
- Family: Craugastoridae
- Genus: Euparkerella
- Species: E. brasiliensis

Binomial name
- Euparkerella brasiliensis (Parker, 1926)

= Euparkerella brasiliensis =

Species of frog

Euparkerella brasiliensis is a species of frog in the family Strabomantidae. It is endemic to Brazil. Its natural habitats are subtropical or tropical moist lowland forest and rural gardens. It is threatened by habitat loss.
