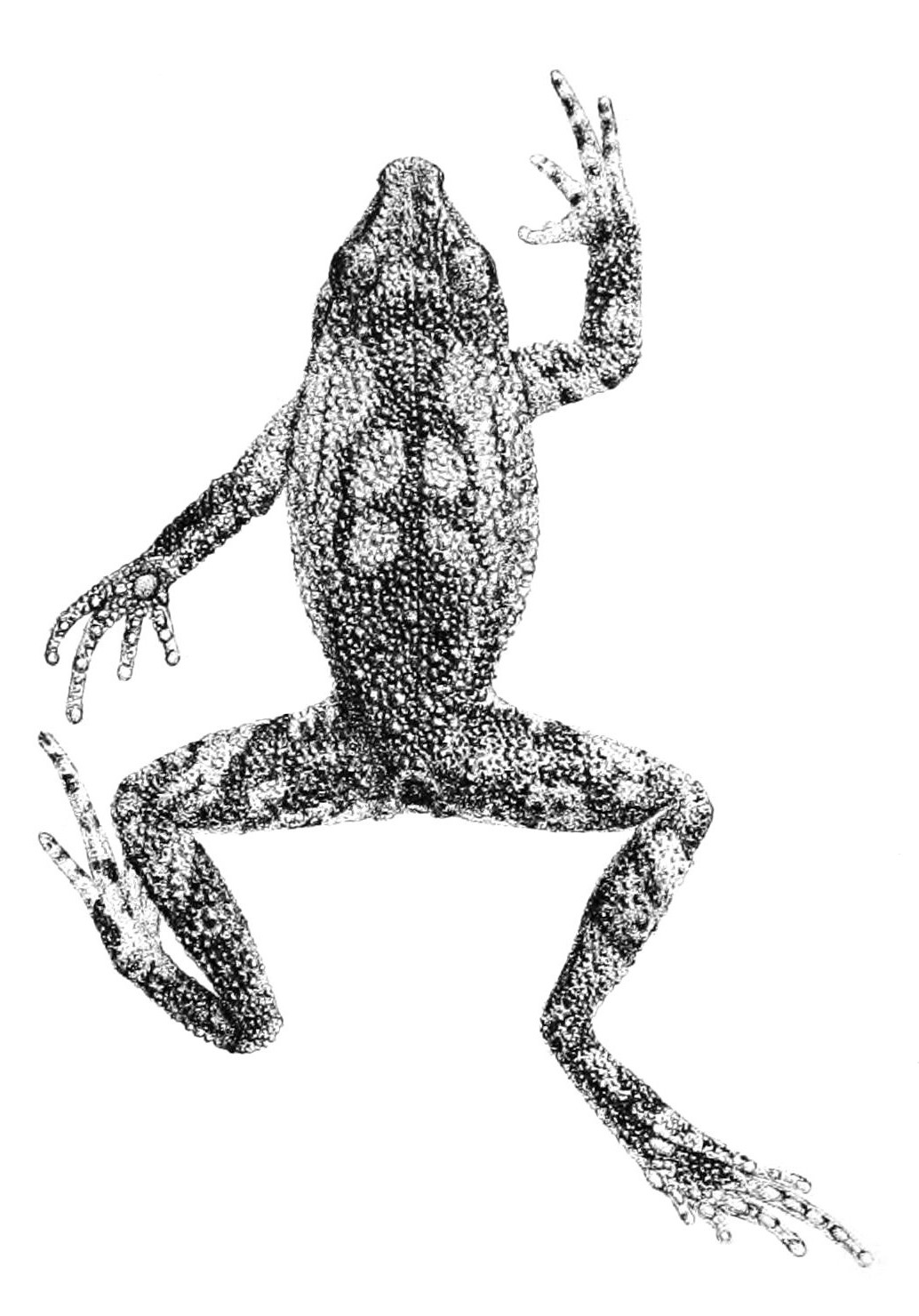

Conservation status
- Data Deficient (IUCN 3.1)

Scientific classification
- Kingdom: Animalia
- Phylum: Chordata
- Class: Amphibia
- Order: Anura
- Family: Bufonidae
- Genus: Dendrophryniscus
- Species: D. proboscideus

Binomial name
- Dendrophryniscus proboscideus (Boulenger, 1882)

Synonyms
- Phryniscus proboscideus Boulenger, 1882; Atelopus proboscideus (Boulenger, 1882); Rhamphophryne proboscidea (Boulenger, 1882); Rhinella boulengeri Chaparro et al., 2007

= Dendrophryniscus proboscideus =

Species of amphibian

Dendrophryniscus proboscideus is a species of toad in the family Bufonidae. It is endemic to Southeastern Brazil and known from isolated records in fragments of Atlantic Forest in eastern Bahia and northeastern Minas Gerais states.

== Taxonomy ==
This species has been through a series of taxonomic changes. It was originally named Phryniscus proboscideus, and then Rhamphophryne proboscidea. A merge of the genus Rhamphophryne into Rhinella briefly placed this species into junior homonymy with a different species, Rhinella proboscidea. To resolve this, it was renamed Rhinella boulengeri in 2007. A 2012 analysis moved the species into the genus Dendrophryniscus and renamed it Dendrophryniscus proboscideus.

== Description ==
Dendrophryniscus proboscideus are relatively large among the Dendrophryniscus, measuring 32 to 47 mm (1.3 to 1.9 in) in snout–vent length. The body is slender and warty. The snout is protruding. The males have nuptial pads.

== Habitat and conservation ==
Dendrophryniscus proboscideus inhabits pristine and somewhat disturbed lowland forests, often in association with small streams. It is a leaf-litter species active during the day. It is threatened by habitat loss caused by expansion of agriculture, wood plantations, and human settlements, livestock grazing, clear-cutting, and collection of bromeliads.
