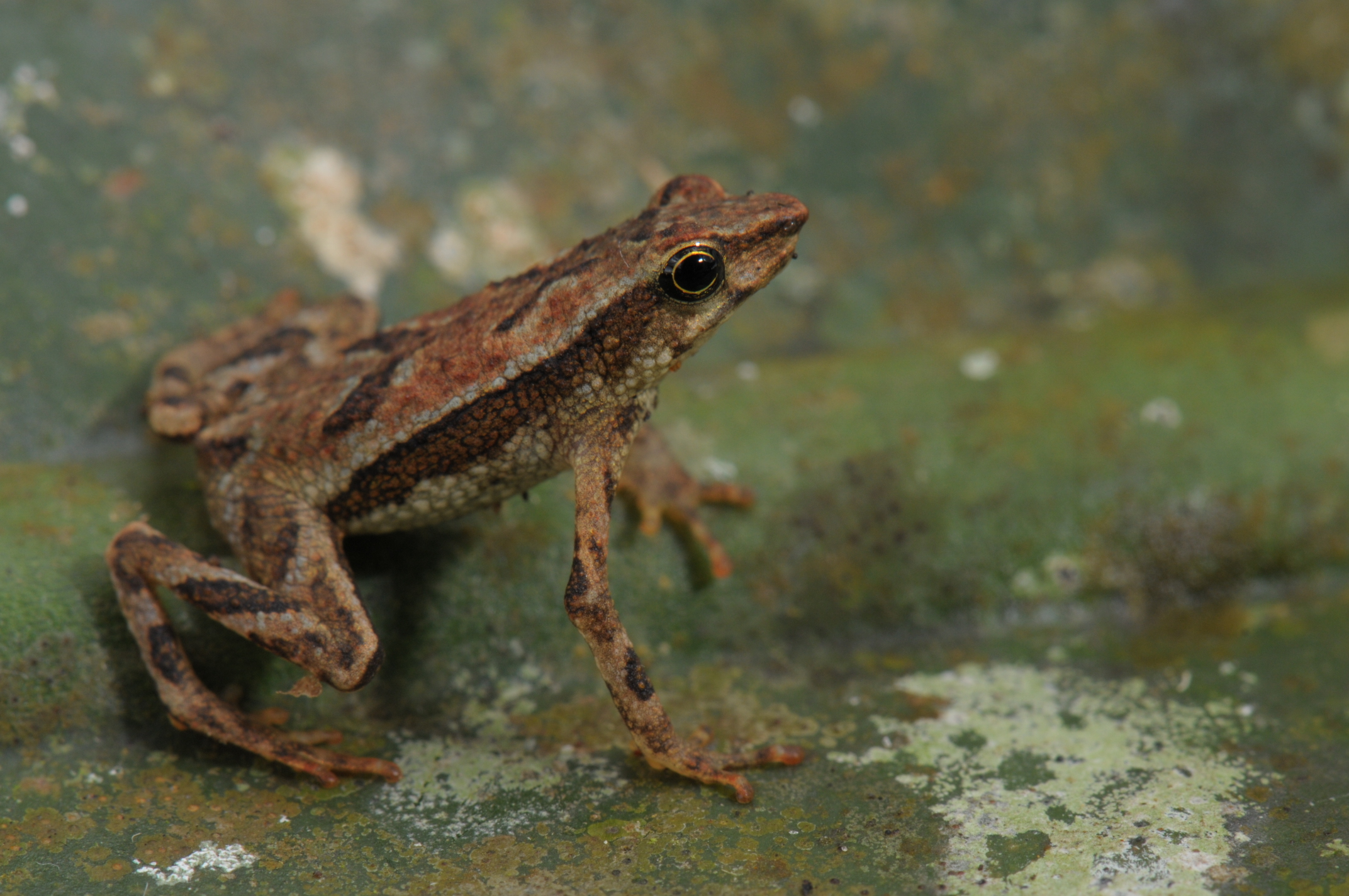

Conservation status
- Least Concern (IUCN 3.1)

Scientific classification
- Kingdom: Animalia
- Phylum: Chordata
- Class: Amphibia
- Order: Anura
- Family: Bufonidae
- Genus: Dendrophryniscus
- Species: D. brevipollicatus

Binomial name
- Dendrophryniscus brevipollicatus Jiménez de la Espada, 1870

Synonyms
- Atelopus imitator Miranda-Ribeiro, 1920

= Dendrophryniscus brevipollicatus =

Species of amphibian

Dendrophryniscus brevipollicatus is a species of toad in the family Bufonidae. It is endemic to Brazil and found on the coastal ranges of São Paulo state and Rio de Janeiro states. Its natural habitats are primary, secondary and seasonally flooded forests up to 900 m (3,000 ft) above sea level. It lives in terrestrial and epiphytic bromeliads, where it also places its eggs. It is a common species, although habitat loss can be a threat.
