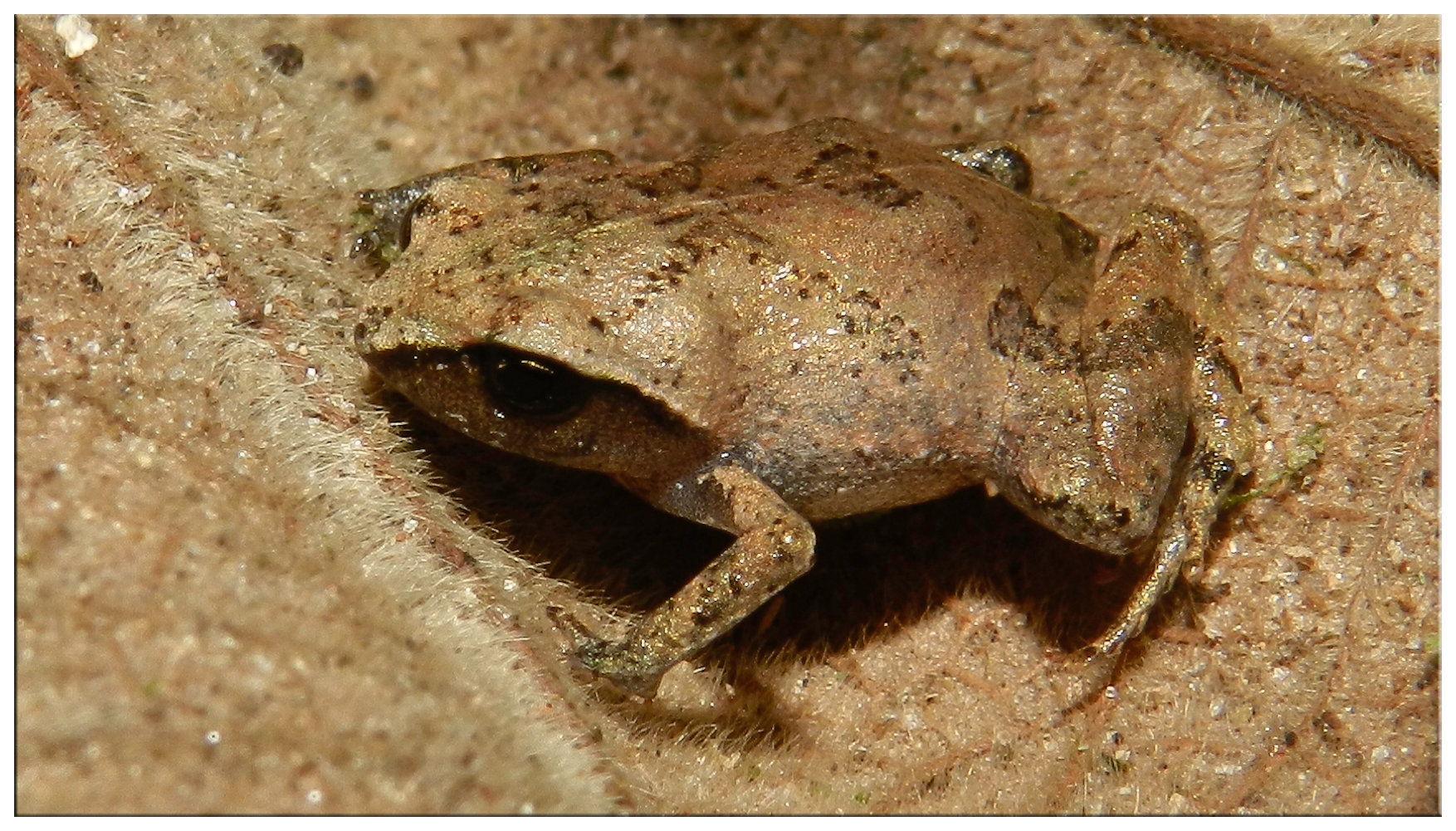
- Euparkerella brasiliensis

Scientific classification
- Kingdom: Animalia
- Phylum: Chordata
- Class: Amphibia
- Order: Anura
- Family: Strabomantidae
- Subfamily: Holoadeninae
- Genus: Euparkerella; Griffiths, 1959

Type species
- Sminthillus brasiliensis Parker, 1926

Diversity
- See text

= Euparkerella =

Genus of amphibians

Euparkerella, sometimes known as Guanabara frogs, is a genus of frogs in the family Strabomantidae. They are endemic to the Atlantic coastal forests in the south-eastern Brazilian states of Espírito Santo and Rio de Janeiro. The name Euparkerella honours H. W. Parker, a herpetologist who named the type species, with the Greek prefix eu meaning true and suffix ella, a diminutive form.

== Taxonomy ==
Species of Euparkerella are traditionally distinguished using morphological traits. However, these species do not align well with genetically distinct units, with the latter suggesting higher diversity than the former, especially within Euparkerella brasiliensis and Euparkerella cochranae. It remains unresolved whether the genetically distinct units qualify as different species.

== Description ==
Species of Euparkerella are small frogs, growing to 22 millimetres (0.87 in) snout–vent length at most. The digits are extremely reduced, compared to those of their larger relatives. Head is narrower than the body. Differentiated tympanic membrane and tympanic annulus are absent. Dorsum is finely granular. Venter is areolate.

== Species ==
The following species are recognized in the genus Euparkerella:

- Euparkerella brasiliensis (Parker, 1926)
- Euparkerella cochranae Izecksohn, 1988
- Euparkerella cryptica Hepp, Carvalho-e-Silva, Carvalho-e-Silva, and Folly, 2015
- Euparkerella robusta Izecksohn, 1988
- Euparkerella tridactyla Izecksohn, 1988
