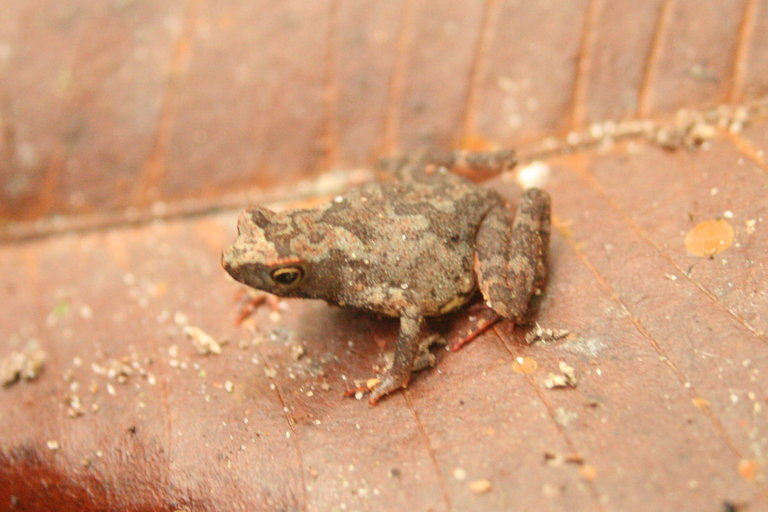

Conservation status
- Least Concern (IUCN 3.1)

Scientific classification
- Kingdom: Animalia
- Phylum: Chordata
- Class: Amphibia
- Order: Anura
- Family: Bufonidae
- Genus: Amazophrynella
- Species: A. minuta

Binomial name
- Amazophrynella minuta (Melin, 1941)

Synonyms
- Atelopus minutus Melin, 1941; Dendrophryniscus minutus (Melin, 1941)

= Amazophrynella minuta =

Species of amphibian

Amazophrynella minuta is a species of toad in the family Bufonidae. It is found in Bolivia, Brazil, Colombia, Ecuador, French Guiana, Guyana, Peru, Suriname, and Venezuela. However, because of the poor description of new Amazophrynella species, it is not clear which old records refer to this species and which records refer to the new species.

Amazophrynella minuta is a forest floor species found in old and second-growth tropical moist forest and premontane humid forest. Breeding takes place in semi-permanent and temporary waterbodies. It is threatened by habitat loss. These are small toads with a maximum snout–vent length of about 24 mm (0.94 in).
