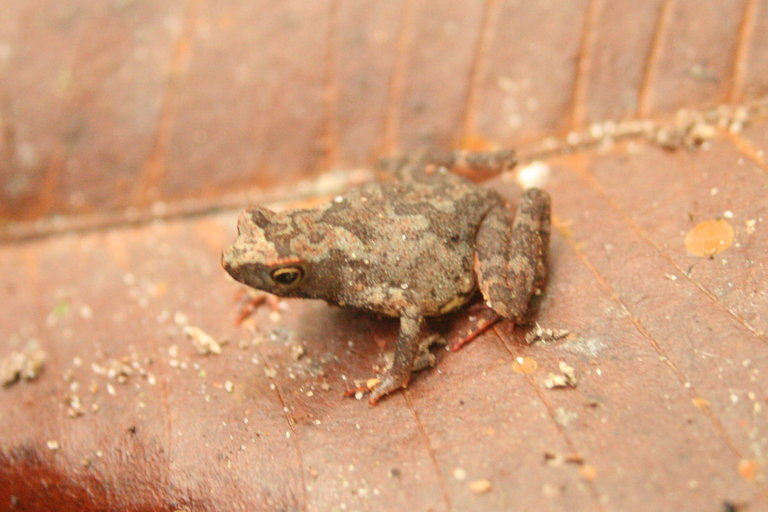
- Amazophrynella minuta

Scientific classification
- Kingdom: Animalia
- Phylum: Chordata
- Class: Amphibia
- Order: Anura
- Family: Bufonidae
- Genus: Amazophrynella; Fouquet et al, 2012

Type species
- Atelopus minutus Melin, 1941

Synonyms
- Amazonella Fouquet et al, 2012

= Amazophrynella =

Genus of amphibians

Amazophrynella is a genus of toads in the family Bufonidae. They are found throughout the Amazon Basin.

== Description ==
Species of the genus Amazophrynella are small toads measuring 12–27 mm (0.47–1.06 in) in snout–vent length. The hind limbs are well developed. The parotoid glands are absent, as are vocal slits and tympana. The skin is uniformly and finely granulose. Dorsal coloration is cryptic.

Species of the genus Amazophrynella are pond breeders, which is presumably an ancestral trait in bufonids (most Dendrophryniscus breed in phytotelmata).

== Taxonomy ==
Amazophrynella was separated from Dendrophryniscus in 2012 based on molecular genetic evidence that indicated deep divergence between an Amazonian and an Atlantic Forest clade, the latter retaining the name Dendrophryniscus whereas the former was described as a new genus Amazonella, later amended to Amazophrynella because of homonymy. The analysis suggested that Amazophrynella is the sister taxon of Dendrophryniscus, but a later study has suggested a more distant relationship.

== Species ==
The following species are recognized in the genus Amazophrynella:

Species	Image
Amazophrynella amazonicola Rojas, Carvalho, Ávila, Farias, Gordo, and Hrbek, 2015	
Amazophrynella bilinguis Kaefer, Rojas, Ferrão, Farias & Lima, 2019	
Amazophrynella bokermanni (Izecksohn, 1994)	
Amazophrynella gardai Mângia, Koroiva & Santana, 2020	
Amazophrynella javierbustamantei Rojas-Zamora, Chaparro, Carvalho, Ávila, Farias, Hrbek, and Gordo, 2016	
Amazophrynella manaos Rojas, Carvalho, Ávila, Farias, and Hrbek, 2014	
Amazophrynella matses Rojas, Carvalho, Ávila, Farias, Gordo, and Hrbek, 2015	
Amazophrynella minuta (Melin, 1941)	
Amazophrynella moisesii Rojas-Zamora, Fouquet, Ron, Hernández-Ruz, Melo-Sampaio, Chaparro, Vogt, Carvalho, Pinheiro, Ávila, Farias, Gordo, and Hrbek, 2018	
Amazophrynella siona Rojas-Zamora, Fouquet, Ron, Hernández-Ruz, Melo-Sampaio, Chaparro, Vogt, Carvalho, Pinheiro, Ávila, Farias, Gordo, and Hrbek, 2018	
Amazophrynella teko Rojas-Zamora, Fouquet, Ron, Hernández-Ruz, Melo-Sampaio, Chaparro, Vogt, Carvalho, Pinheiro, Ávila, Farias, Gordo, and Hrbek, 2018	
Amazophrynella vote Ávila, Carvalho, Gordo, Kawashita-Ribeiro, and Morais, 2012	
Amazophrynella xinguensis Rojas-Zamora, Fouquet, Ron, Hernández-Ruz, Melo-Sampaio, Chaparro, Vogt, Carvalho, Pinheiro, Ávila, Farias, Gordo, and Hrbek, 2018	
