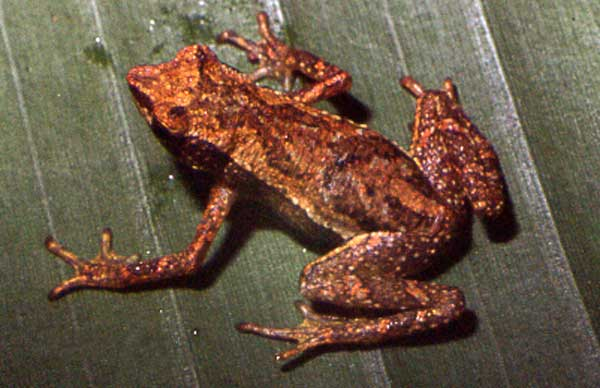
- Dendrophryniscus berthalutzae

Scientific classification
- Domain: Eukaryota
- Kingdom: Animalia
- Phylum: Chordata
- Class: Amphibia
- Order: Anura
- Family: Bufonidae
- Genus: Dendrophryniscus; Jiménez de la Espada, 1870

Type species
- Dendrophryniscus brevipollicatus Jiménez de la Espada, 1870

Species
- 16, see text

= Dendrophryniscus =

Genus of amphibians

Dendrophryniscus is a genus of true toads in the family Bufonidae, sometimes known as tree toads. They are endemic to the Atlantic Forest of Brazil.

== Taxonomy ==
Until 2012, the genus Dendrophryniscus included the species now separated to the genus Amazophrynella. This was based on molecular genetic evidence that indicated deep divergence between an Amazonian and an Atlantic Forest clade, the latter retaining the name Dendrophryniscus whereas the former was described as a new genus Amazonella, later amended to Amazophrynella because of homonymy.

== Description ==
The species of Dendrophryniscus are small to medium-sized toads measuring 15–47 mm (0.59–1.85 in) in snout–vent length. Their body form resembles those of the genus Atelopus. The hind limbs are well developed. The parotoid glands are absent, as are external tympana. The skin is uniformly granulose to warty. Dorsal coloration is cryptic.

With the exception of Dendrophryniscus leucomystax, species of the genus Dendrophryniscus breed in phytotelmata. In contrast, species of the genus Amazophrynella are pond breeders, which is presumably an ancestral trait in bufonids.

== Species ==
The following species are recognized in the genus Dendrophryniscus:

- Dendrophryniscus berthalutzae Izecksohn, 1994
- Dendrophryniscus brevipollicatus Jiménez de la Espada, 1870
- Dendrophryniscus carvalhoi Izecksohn, 1994
- Dendrophryniscus davori Cruz, Caramaschi, Fusinatto, and Brasileiro, 2019
- Dendrophryniscus haddadi Cruz, Caramaschi, Fusinatto, and Brasileiro, 2019
- Dendrophryniscus imitator (Miranda-Ribeiro, 1920)
- Dendrophryniscus izecksohni Cruz, Caramaschi, Fusinatto, and Brasileiro, 2019
- Dendrophryniscus jureia Cruz, Caramaschi, Fusinatto, and Brasileiro, 2019
- Dendrophryniscus krausae Cruz and Fusinatto, 2008
- Dendrophryniscus lauroi (Miranda-Ribeiro, 1926)
- Dendrophryniscus leucomystax Izecksohn, 1968
- Dendrophryniscus oreites Recoder, Teixeira, Cassimiro, Camacho, and Rodrigues, 2010
- Dendrophryniscus organensis Carvalho-e-Silva, Mongin, Izecksohn, and Carvalho-e-Silva, 2010
- Dendrophryniscus proboscideus (Boulenger, 1882)
- Dendrophryniscus skuki (Caramaschi, 2012)
- Dendrophryniscus stawiarskyi Izecksohn, 1994
