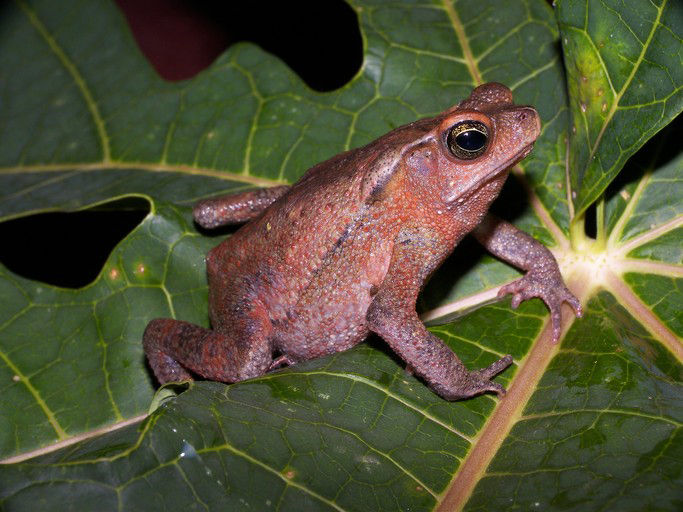

Conservation status
- Least Concern (IUCN 3.1)

Scientific classification
- Kingdom: Animalia
- Phylum: Chordata
- Class: Amphibia
- Order: Anura
- Family: Bufonidae
- Genus: Rhinella
- Species: R. margaritifera

Binomial name
- Rhinella margaritifera (Laurenti, 1768)

Synonyms
- Bufo margaritifer (Laurenti, 1768); Bufo typhonius

= South American common toad =

Species of amphibian

The South American common toad (Rhinella margaritifera; also mitred toad, in Spanish sapo crestado) is a species complex of toads in the family Bufonidae. They are found throughout the Amazonian South America (Bolivia, Brazil, Colombia, Ecuador, French Guiana, Guyana, Peru, Suriname, and Venezuela) and eastern Panama. It was originally believed to be a single species, but is now known to represent a complex of more than one.

Its natural habitats are primary and secondary lowland, premontane and montane tropical moist forests (including terra firme and seasonally flooded forests). It is a generalist species that can also be found in disturbed areas.

== Member species ==
As of 2013, there were 16 formally described species within this complex, as well as an unknown number that are yet to be recognized.

- Rhinella acutirostris
- Rhinella alata
- Rhinella castaneotica
- Rhinella dapsilis
- Rhinella hoogmoedi
- Rhinella lescurei
- Rhinella magnussoni
- Rhinella margaritifera
- Rhinella paraguayensis
- Rhinella martyi
- Rhinella ocellata
- Rhinella proboscidea
- Rhinella roqueana
- Rhinella scitula
- Rhinella sclerocephala
- Rhinella stanlaii
