= Dendropsophus goughi =

Scientific classification
- Kingdom: Animalia
- Phylum: Chordata
- Class: Amphibia
- Order: Anura
- Family: Hylidae
- Genus: Dendropsophus
- Species: D. goughi

Binomial name
- Dendropsophus goughi (Boulenger, 1911)

Synonyms
- Hyla goughi Boulenger, 1911; Hyla goughi goughi Cochran, 1953

Species of frog

Dendropsophus goughi, the Guianan dwarf tree frog, is a species of frog in the family Hylidae. It is endemic to Trinidad. Scientists have seen it as high as 1200 meters above sea level.

For a time, scientists considered this frog conspecific with Dendropsophus microcephalus.

== See also ==
- Dendropsophus minutus, lesser treefrog
