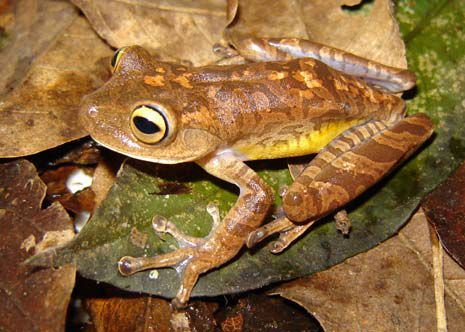
- Male from the municipality of Cotia

Conservation status
- Critically endangered, possibly extinct (IUCN 3.1)

Scientific classification
- Kingdom: Animalia
- Phylum: Chordata
- Class: Amphibia
- Order: Anura
- Family: Hylidae
- Genus: Bokermannohyla
- Species: B. izecksohni

Binomial name
- Bokermannohyla izecksohni (Jim and Caramaschi, 1979)

Synonyms
- Hyla izecksohni Jim and Caramaschi, 1979; Boana izecksohni (Jim and Caramaschi, 1979)

= Bokermannohyla izecksohni =

Species of frog

Bokermannohyla izecksohni, also known as Izecksohn's treefrog, is a species of frog in the family Hylidae. It is endemic to São Paulo state, Brazil. It was already considered possibly extinct in 2004, but three living frogs were discovered in 2005–2006. It is a medium-sized treefrog, measuring about 45 mm (1.8 in) in snout–vent length.

== Etymology ==
The specific name izecksohni honours Eugênio Izecksohn, a Brazilian herpetologist.

== Habitat and conservation ==
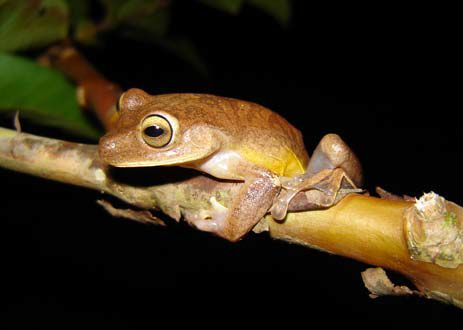
Female from the municipality of Cotia.

Bokermannohyla izecksohni occurs in forests near streams at elevations of 700–900 m (2,300–3,000 ft) above sea level. Breeding takes place in temporary ponds. It is threatened by habitat loss: the type locality has already been destroyed by agriculture and human settlement. However, the discovery of two new populations in 2005–2006 suggested that it is not quite as threatened as previously feared; one of them is in the Serra do Mar State Park where it has already been recorded later.
