= Dendrophryniscus skuki =

Scientific classification
- Domain: Eukaryota
- Kingdom: Animalia
- Phylum: Chordata
- Class: Amphibia
- Order: Anura
- Family: Bufonidae
- Genus: Dendrophryniscus
- Species: D. skuki

Binomial name
- Dendrophryniscus skuki (Caramaschi, 2012)
- Dendrophryniscus skuki is only known from Itacaré, northeastern Brazil

Synonyms
- Rhinella skuki Caramaschi, 2012

Species of amphibian

Dendrophryniscus skuki is a species of toad in the family Bufonidae. It is endemic to northeastern Brazil and only known from its type locality in the municipality of Itacaré, state of Bahia. This species is dedicated to herpetologist Gabriel "Gabo" Skuk, the species describer's friend who perished in a diving accident.

== Description ==
The holotype is an adult male with a stout build and measuring 26 mm (1.0 in) in snout–vent length. The head is slightly longer than it is wide. The snout is long, narrow, and spatulate when viewed from above. The canthus rostralis is distinct and slightly concave. The eyes are large but not prominent. The tympanum is hidden. Apart from the gular region and chest that are barely rugose, skin is rugose with uniformly distributed rounded tubercles. The parotoid glands are large and rounded. The fingers and the toes are slender and have rounded tips and no webbing, although the toes are slightly fringed. The preserved specimen is dorsally dark brownish gray with clear brownish gray interorbital bar and dorsolateral blotches. The venter and ventral surfaces of arms and thighs are cream with diffuse gray stains and dots.

== Habitat and conservation ==
The holotype was collected from a near-coastal locality at 13 m (43 ft) above sea level. No other ecological data accompany the species description. As of late 2020, this species had not been assessed for the IUCN Red List of Threatened Species.
