= Myotis izecksohni =

Conservation status
- Data Deficient (IUCN 3.1)

Scientific classification
- Kingdom: Animalia
- Phylum: Chordata
- Class: Mammalia
- Order: Chiroptera
- Family: Vespertilionidae
- Genus: Myotis
- Species: M. izecksohni

Binomial name
- Myotis izecksohni Moratelli, Peracchi, Dias & de Oliveira, 2011
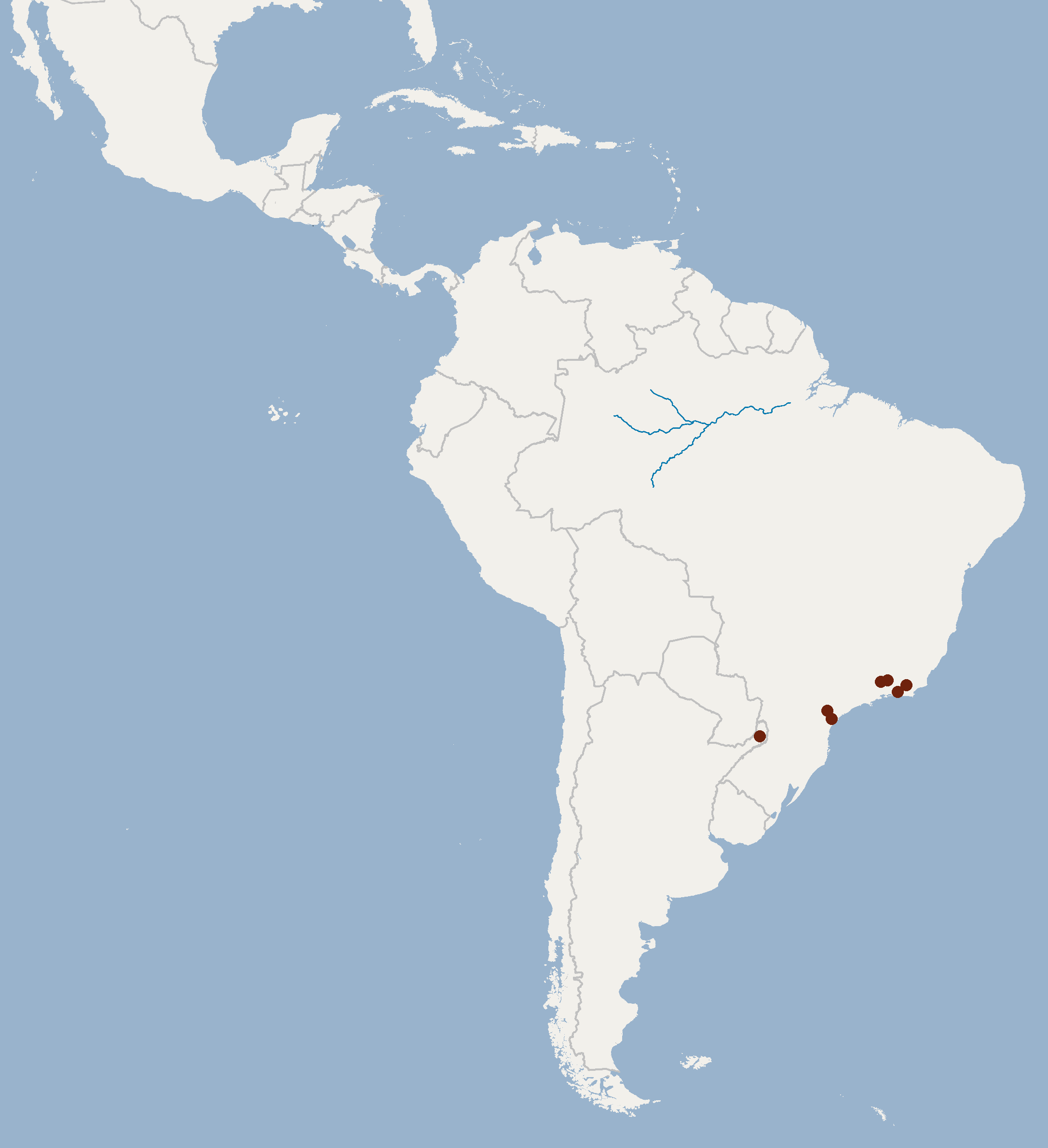

Species of bat

Myotis izecksohni is a species of mouse-eared bat that is endemic to Brazil and Argentina.

== Taxonomy ==
M. izecksohni was described as a new species in 2011. The holotype had been collected in 2005 in Tinguá Biological Reserve. The eponym for the species name "izecksohni" is Brazilian biologist Eugênio Izecksohn.

== Description ==
It is a medium- to large-bodied mouse-eared bat among those found in South America. It has a forearm length ranging from 33.1–38.3 mm (1.30–1.51 in). Its fur is long with a silky texture; the fur of its back is bicolored, with the basal two-thirds of individual hairs dark, while the distal third is dark-brown to medium-brown. The fur of its belly is also bicolored, though overall lighter brown than the back fur. It lacks hairs along the outer edge of the uropatagium, which is a useful field identification characteristic.

== Range and habitat ==
M. izecksohni was first documented in southeastern Brazil and has since been discovered in far northeastern Argentina. It has been found at a range of elevations from 760–1,000 m (2,490–3,280 ft) above sea level.
