= Bom Jesus do Sul =

Coordinates: 26.1928°S 53.5969°W

- Municipality
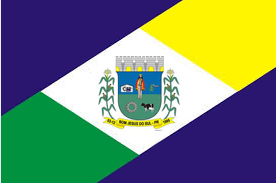
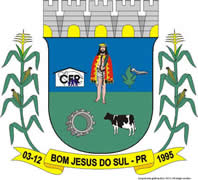
- Flag Coat of arms
- Interactive map of Bom Jesus do Sul
- Country: Brazil
- Region: Southern
- State: Paraná
- Mesoregion: Sudoeste Paranaense

Population (2020)
  - Total: 3,506
- Time zone: UTC−3 (BRT)

Bom Jesus do Sul is a municipality in the state of Paraná in the Southern Region of Brazil.

== See also ==
- List of municipalities in Paraná
