= Serra das Torres Natural Monument =

Mountain peaks in Brazil

- Monumento Natural Estadual de Serra das Torres
- Location within Brazil
- Nearest city: Mimoso do Sul, Espírito Santo
- Coordinates: 21°00′46″S 41°14′05″W
- Area: 10,458.90 hectares (25,844.5 acres)
- Designation: Natural monument
- Created: 11 June 2010
- Administrator: IEMA: Instituto Estadual de Meio Ambiente e Recursos Hídricos

The Serra das Torres Natural Monument (Portuguese: Monumento Natural Estadual de Serra das Torres) is a natural monument in the state of Espírito Santo, Brazil. It protects the peaks of a mountain range in the south of the state.

== Location ==
The Serra das Torres Natural Monument is in the municipalities of Mimoso do Sul, Muqui and Atílio Vivacqua, Espírito Santo. It has an area of 10,458.90 hectares (25,844.5 acres). The monument covers the higher portions of the mountains in the three municipalities, dominated by rocky outcroppings and forest remnants. Private ownership of land is allowed as long as its usage is compatible with the conservation objectives.

== History ==
Discussion about creating the natural monument began in 2007. Public consultations were held in December 2009. The Serra das Torres State Natural Monument was created by state law 9.463 of 11 June 2010. Objectives included preserving a site of great natural or scenic beauty, preserving geodiversity and the integrity of the rock formations of the Serra das Torres massif, protecting the remaining forests and preserving biodiversity, protecting springs and aquifers that contribute to the Itabapoana and Itapemirim rivers, increasing genetic connectivity between the forest remnants in the region, and promoting sustainable development, ecotourism, environmental education, scientific research. It became part of the Central Atlantic Forest Ecological Corridor, created in 2002.

== Sources ==
- Consulta pública para a criação de unidade de conservação no sul do estado do Espírito Santo, o "Monumento Natural Estadual de Serra das Torres" (PDF) (in Portuguese), IEMA, archived from the original (PDF) on 2016-10-28
- Hartung Gomes, Paulo Cesar (11 June 2010), Lei Nº 9.463 (in Portuguese), archived from the original on 2016-10-28
- Monumento Natural da Serra das Torres (in Portuguese), SEAMA, archived from the original on 2016-10-28
- Lamas, Ivana Reis; Crepaldi, Maria Otávia; Mesquita, Carlos Alberto Bernardo (2015), Uma Rede no Corredor (PDF) (in Portuguese), Conservação Internacional (CI-Brasil), ISBN 978-85-98830-28-5, archived from the original (PDF) on 2016-10-22
