= Bituruna =

Coordinates: 26°10′S 51°34′W

- Municipality
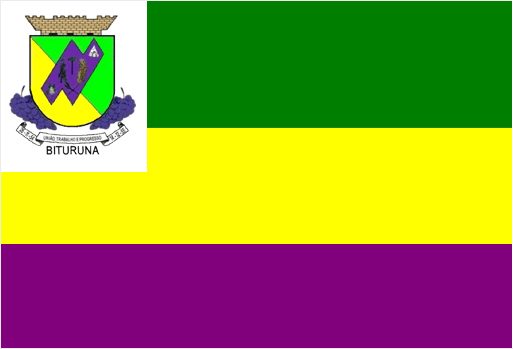
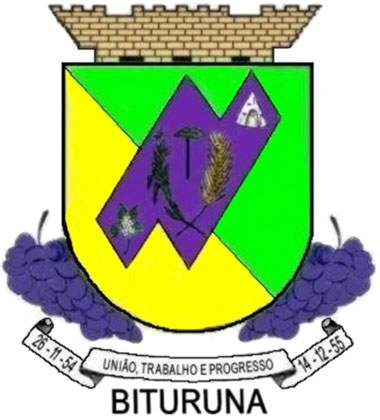
- Flag Coat of arms
- Interactive map of Bituruna
- Country: Brazil
- Region: Southern
- State: Paraná
- Mesoregion: Sudeste Paranaense

Population (2020)
  - Total: 16,400
- Time zone: UTC−3 (BRT)

Bituruna is a municipality in the state of Paraná in the Southern Region of Brazil.

== See also ==
- List of municipalities in Paraná
