= Melin Shorthand =

Melin shorthand
- Script type: light-line-line script Shorthand
- Creator: Olof Werling Melin
- Period: 1880-
- Languages: Swedish

The Melin system of shorthand is the dominant shorthand system used in Sweden. It was created by Olof Melin (1849–1940), an officer in the Swedish Army. He was a teacher of the Gabelsberger shorthand system in the Swedish army, but he was dissatisfied with it so he created an alternate system, that today is known as the Melin System.

== Basic forms ==
The basic forms of the Melin System are the consonants, vowels, and combinations. In addition there are a large number of ending forms as well as abbreviations. The basic forms are shown below:

Some of the vowels and consonants have the same shapes, but they are distinguishable from their context, as vowels are always written from the bottom up and consonants from the top down.

Here follows a longer text from the 1917 edition of the Swedish encyclopedia Nordisk familjebok:

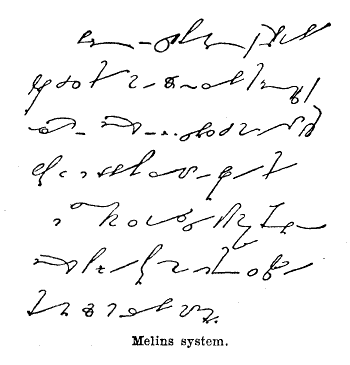

In clear text this corresponds to:

Korthet och snabbskrifvenhet äro onekligen viktiga egenskaper hos stenografien, men af fullt ut lika stor betydelse är tillförlitligheten och tydligheten, och där den saknas, har man intet egentligt gagn för det praktiska lifvet af kunskapen i stenografi. Det system, som visar sig bäst motsvara anspråken på tydlighet, skall därför i längden komma att stå som segrare i striden mellan de olika metoderna.

In English translation:

Conciseness and the ability to write fast are no doubt important traits for the shorthand practitioner, but just as important are the reliability and the clarity, and where it is lacking, there is no gain in practical life for the knowledge of shorthand. The system, that is shown to best fulfill the requirements of clarity, will therefore in the long run stand out as a winner in the battle between the different methods.
