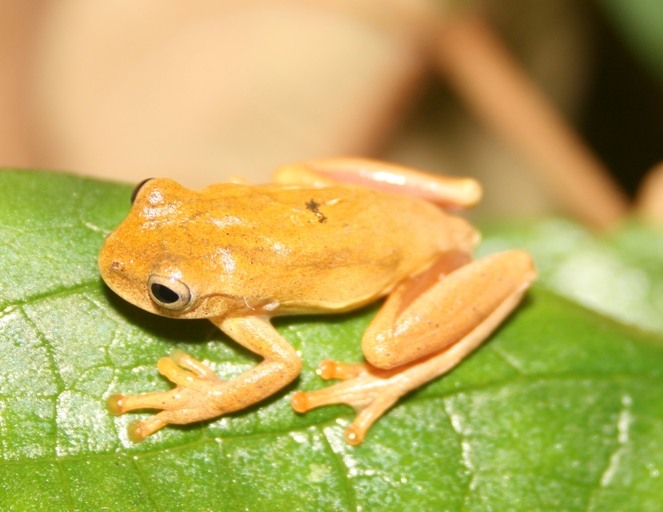

Conservation status
- Least Concern (IUCN 3.1)

Scientific classification
- Kingdom: Animalia
- Phylum: Chordata
- Class: Amphibia
- Order: Anura
- Family: Hylidae
- Genus: Dendropsophus
- Species: D. minutus

Binomial name
- Dendropsophus minutus (Peters, 1872)

Synonyms
- Hyla minuta Peters, 1872; Hyla minuta Boulenger, 1882; Hyla venata Cope 1887; Hyla bivittata Boulenger, 1888; Hyla pallens Lutz, 1925; Hyla suturata Miranda-Ribeiro, 1926; Hyla emrichi Mertens, 1927; Hyla minuta bivittata Barrio, 1967; Dendropsophus minutus Faivovich, Haddad, Garcia, Frost, Campbell, and Wheeler, 2005

= Dendropsophus minutus =

Lesser treefrog

Species of frog

Dendropsophus minutus (lesser treefrog) is a species of frog in the family Hylidae. It is found in Argentina, Bolivia, Brazil, Colombia, Ecuador, French Guiana, Guyana, Paraguay, Peru, Suriname, Trinidad and Tobago, Uruguay, and Venezuela. In Spanish it is known as ranita amarilla común.

Its natural habitats are subtropical or tropical dry forests, subtropical or tropical moist lowland forests, subtropical or tropical moist montane forests, dry savanna, moist savanna, subtropical or tropical seasonally wet or flooded lowland grassland, intermittent freshwater marshes, pastureland, rural gardens, urban areas, heavily degraded former forest, ponds, and canals and ditches. Scientists have seen it as high as 2000 meters above sea level and as low as at sea level.

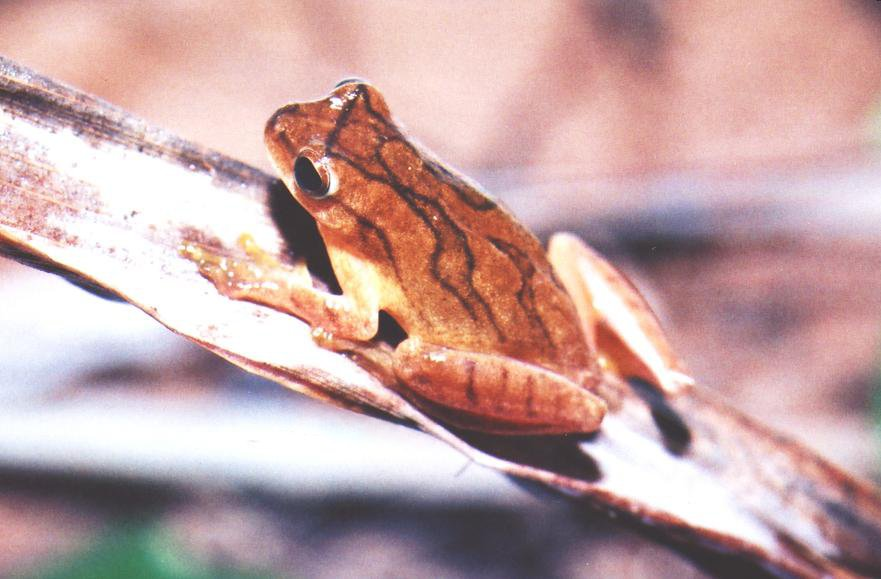
Lesser tree frogs can look very different from each other.

During the breeding period, the male frogs perch on grass and shrubs near water and on plants mid-water. The male frogs have shown territorial and competitive behavior near preferred perches. The females lay eggs in still bodies of water, such as ponds and puddles. This frog ranges across a very large part of South America, in a variety of habitats, so the individual frogs can be considerably different from each other. In 2014, a team of 30 scientists studied the mtDNA of this frog and found the species had 47 different groups in it.

== See also ==
- Dendropsophus goughi, the Guianan dwarf tree frog
