= Atílio Vivacqua =

- Municipality
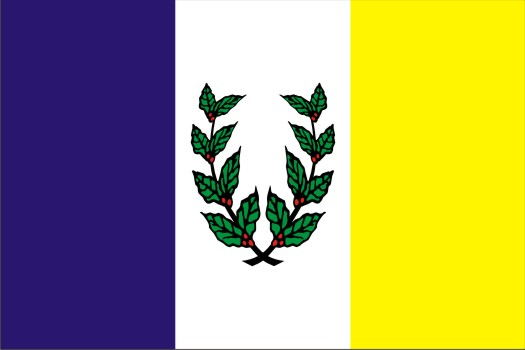
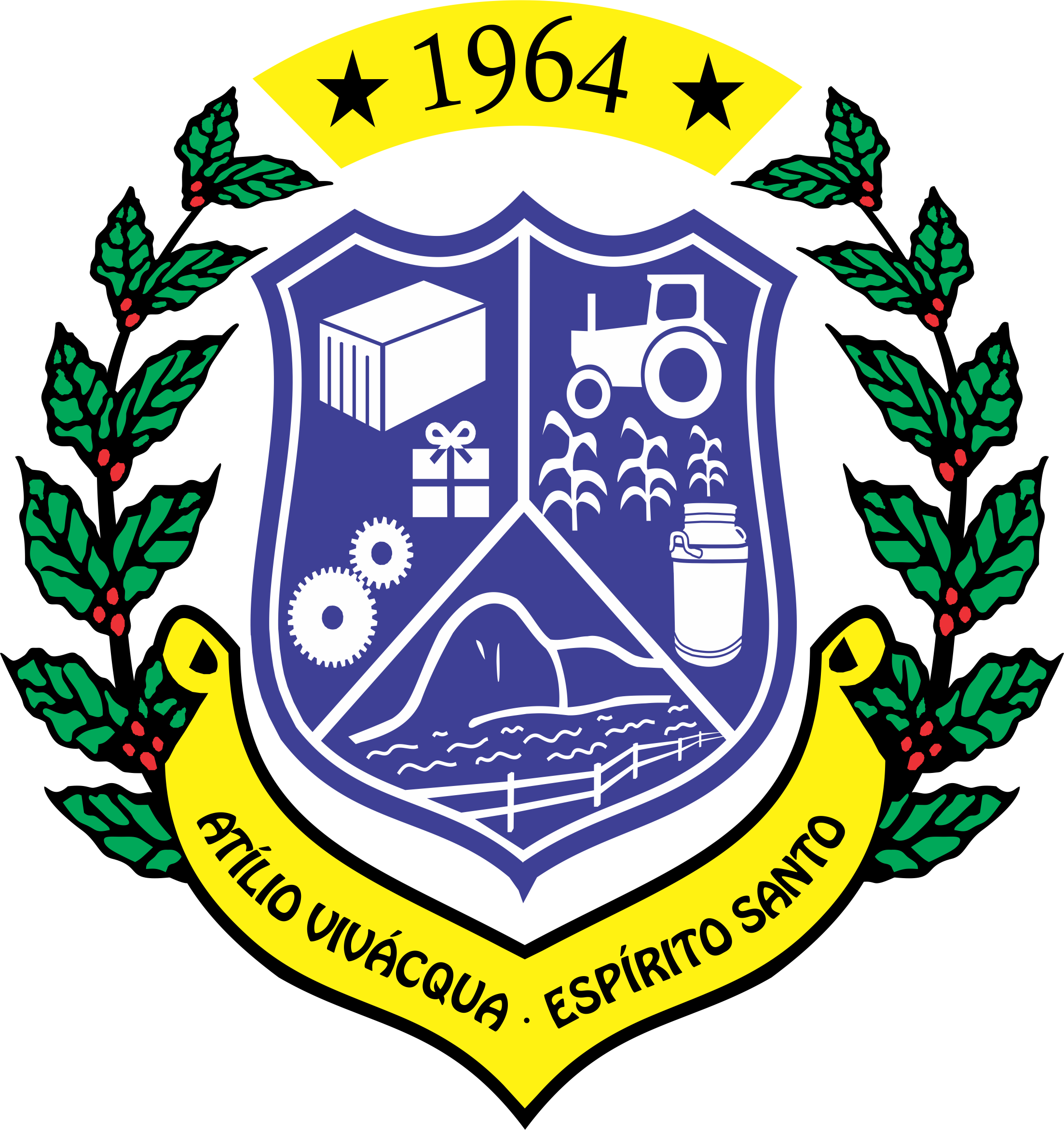
- Flag Coat of arms

- Location in Espírito Santo state

- Location in Brazil
- Coordinates: 20°54′50″S 41°11′52″W
- Country: Brazil
- Region: Southeast
- State: Espírito Santo
- Established: 10 April 1963

Area
  - Total: 223 km^{2} (86 sq mi)

Population (2020)
  - Total: 12,105
  - Density: 54.3/km^{2} (141/sq mi)
- Time zone: UTC−3 (BRT)

Atílio Vivacqua (Note: Due to orthographic changes and Portuguese naming conventions, the first 'a' in Vivacqua sometimes has an acute accent (´).) is a Brazilian municipality in the state of Espírito Santo. Its population was 12,105 (2020) and its area is 223 km^{2}.

The municipality contains part of the 10,459 hectares (25,840 acres) Serra das Torres Natural Monument, created in 2010 to protect the mountain peaks in the area.

== History ==
Until 10 April 1964, Atílio Vivacqua was a district of Cachoeiro de Itapemirim called Marapé. The municipality is named for Senator Atílio Vivácqua (1894–1961).
