= Bom Jesus do Oeste =

- Municipality
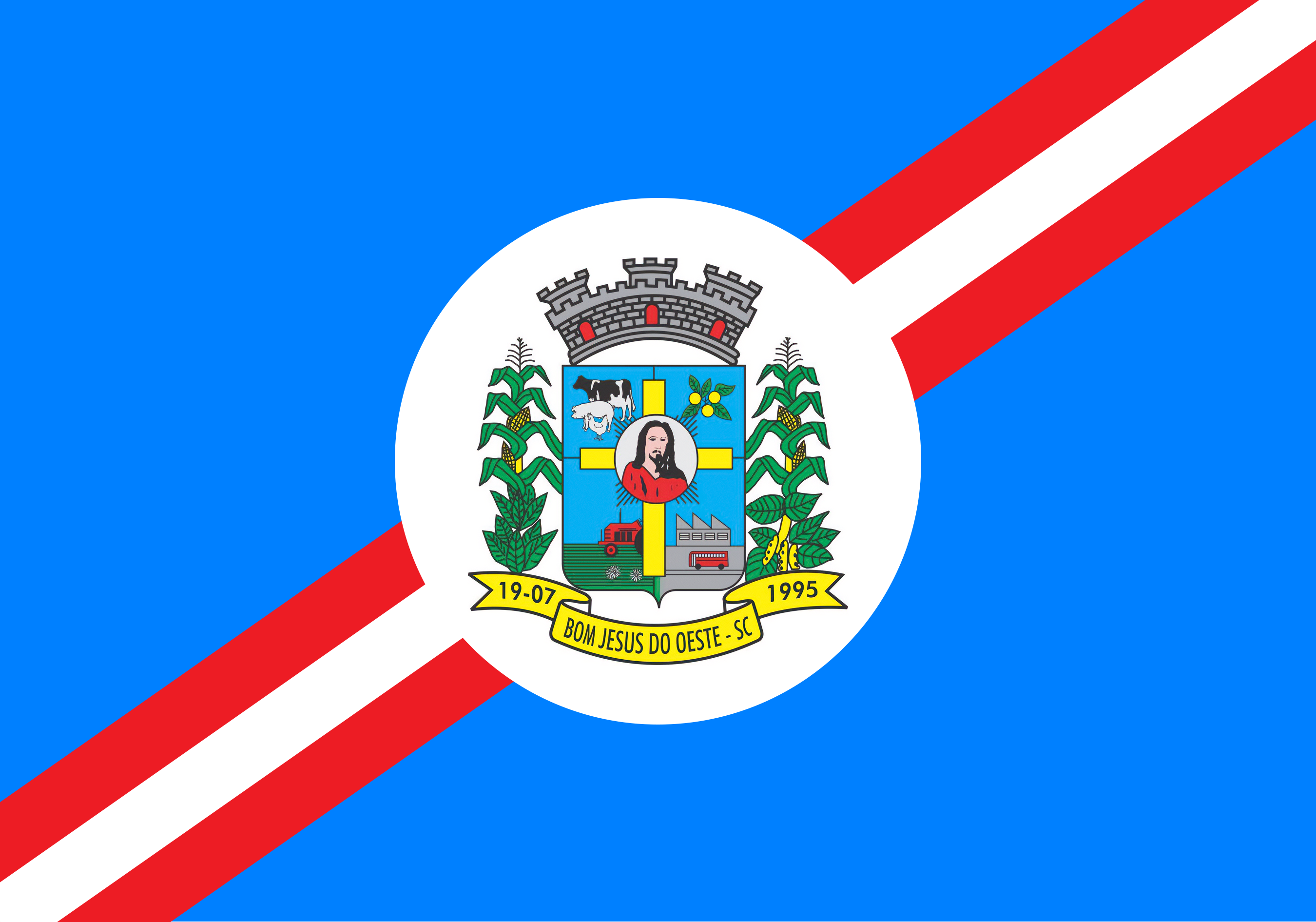
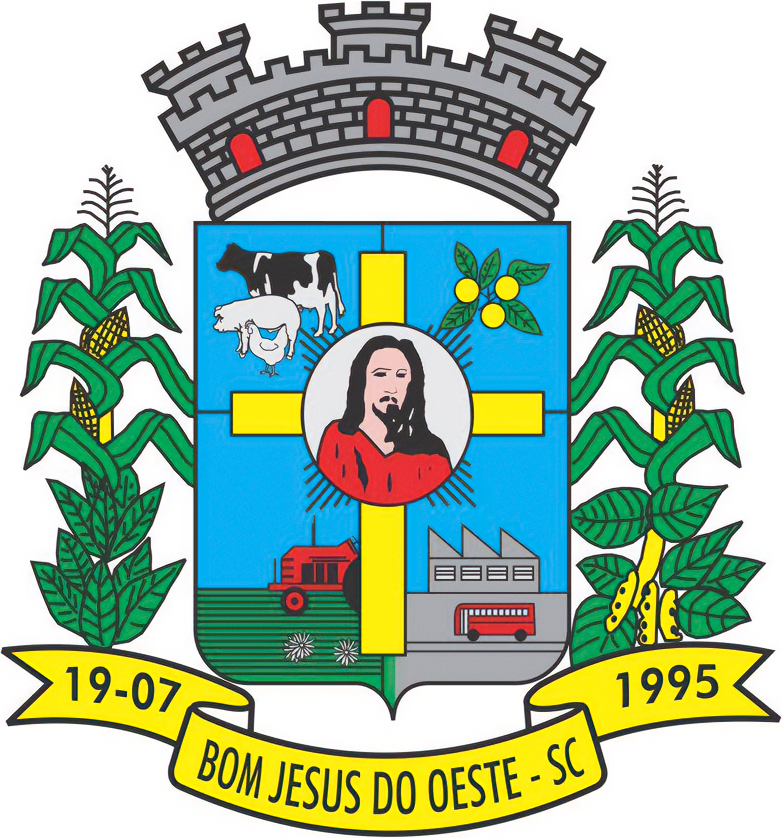
- Flag Coat of arms

- Location in Brazil
- Coordinates: 26°44′02″S 52°23′28″W
- Country: Brazil
- Region: South
- State: Santa Catarina
- Mesoregion: Oeste Catarinense
- Founded: 19 July 1995

Government
  - Mayor: Clovis Fernandes de Souza

Area
  - Total: 63.552 km^{2} (24.538 sq mi)
- Elevation: 669 m (2,195 ft)

Population (2020)
  - Total: 2,139
  - Density: 33.66/km^{2} (87.17/sq mi)
- Time zone: UTC -3
- Website: bomjesusdooeste.sc.gov.br

Bom Jesus do Oeste is a municipality in the state of Santa Catarina in the South region of Brazil.

== See also ==
- List of municipalities in Santa Catarina
