= Bom Jesus, Porto Alegre =

Neighborhood in Porto Alegre, Brazil

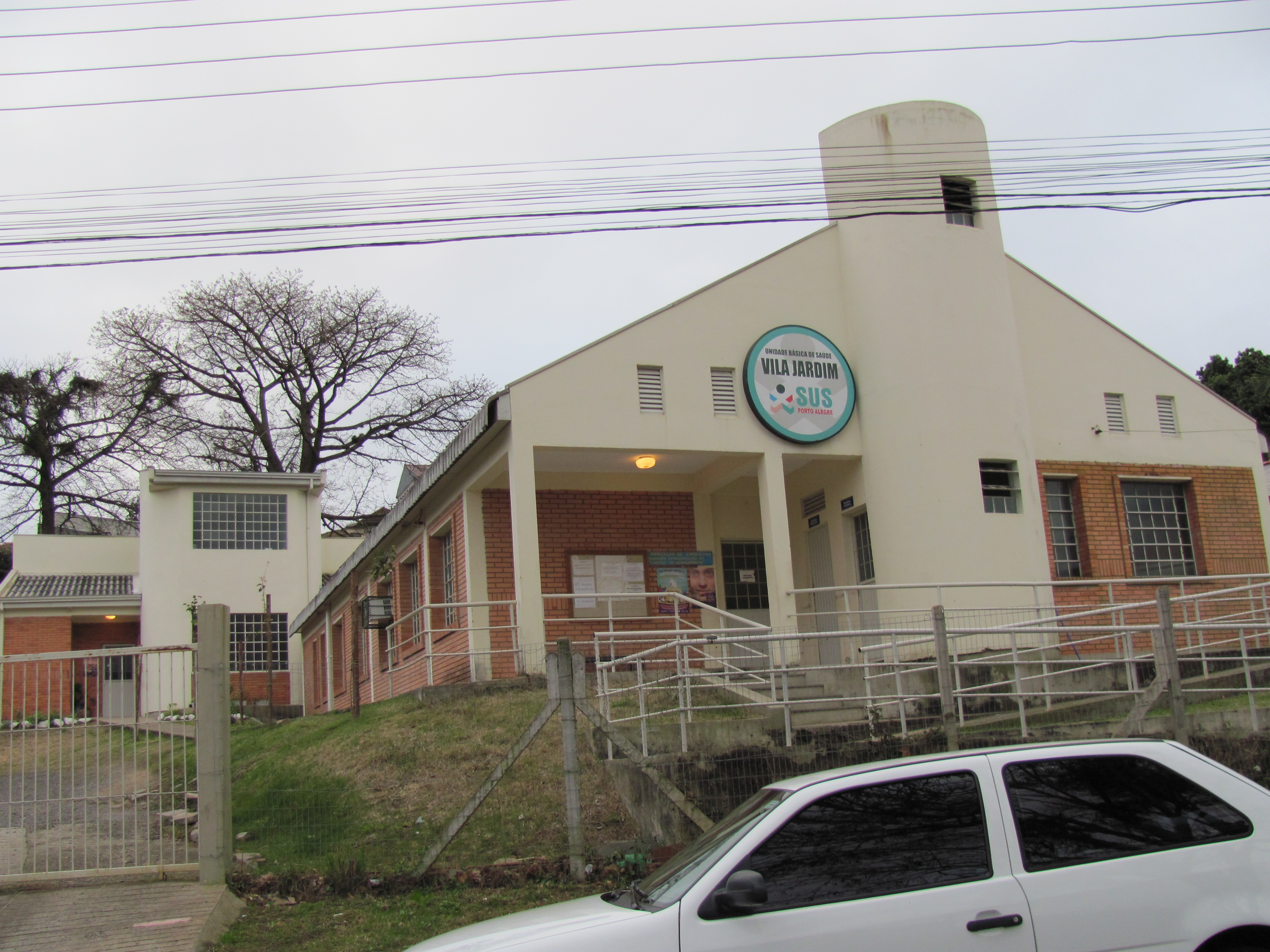
Basic health unit in Bom Jesus.

Bom Jesus (meaning Good Jesus in Portuguese) is a neighbourhood (bairro) in the city of Porto Alegre, the state capital of Rio Grande do Sul, in Brazil, with a population of 11202, and covering an area of 2.6 million km². It was created by Law 5799 from December 15, 1986, but had its limits modified by Law 6594 from January 31, 1990.
