= Muqui, Espírito Santo =

Coordinates: 20°57′07″S 41°20′45″W

Muqui
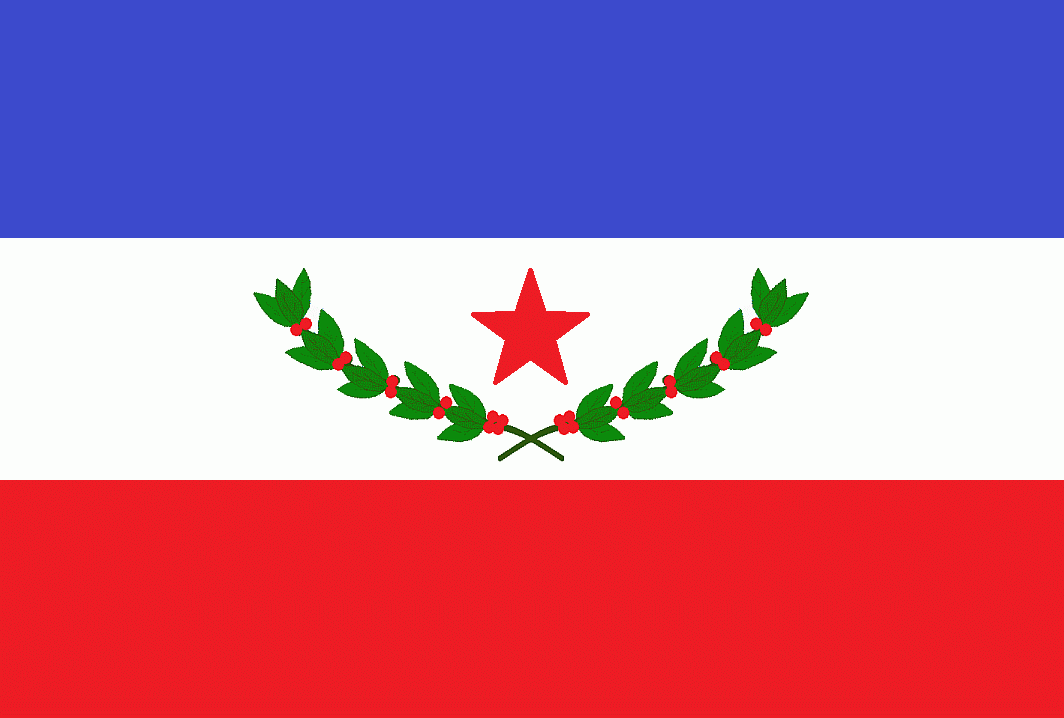
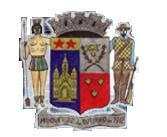
- Flag Coat of arms

- Founded: 22 October 1912

Area
  - Total: 326.873 km^{2} (126.206 sq mi)

Population (2020)
  - Total: 15,526
  - Density: 47/km^{2} (120/sq mi)

Muqui is a municipality located in the Brazilian state of Espírito Santo. Its population was 15,526 (2020) and its area is 327 km^{2} (126 sq mi).

The municipality contains part of the 10,459-hectare (25,840-acre) Serra das Torres Natural Monument, created in 2010 to protect the mountain peaks in the area.

== Etymology ==
The word muqui is of indigenous origin, meaning "between hills", referring to its mountainous geography.

== See also ==
- List of municipalities in Espírito Santo
