= Douglas Melin =

Swedish long jumper and zoologist

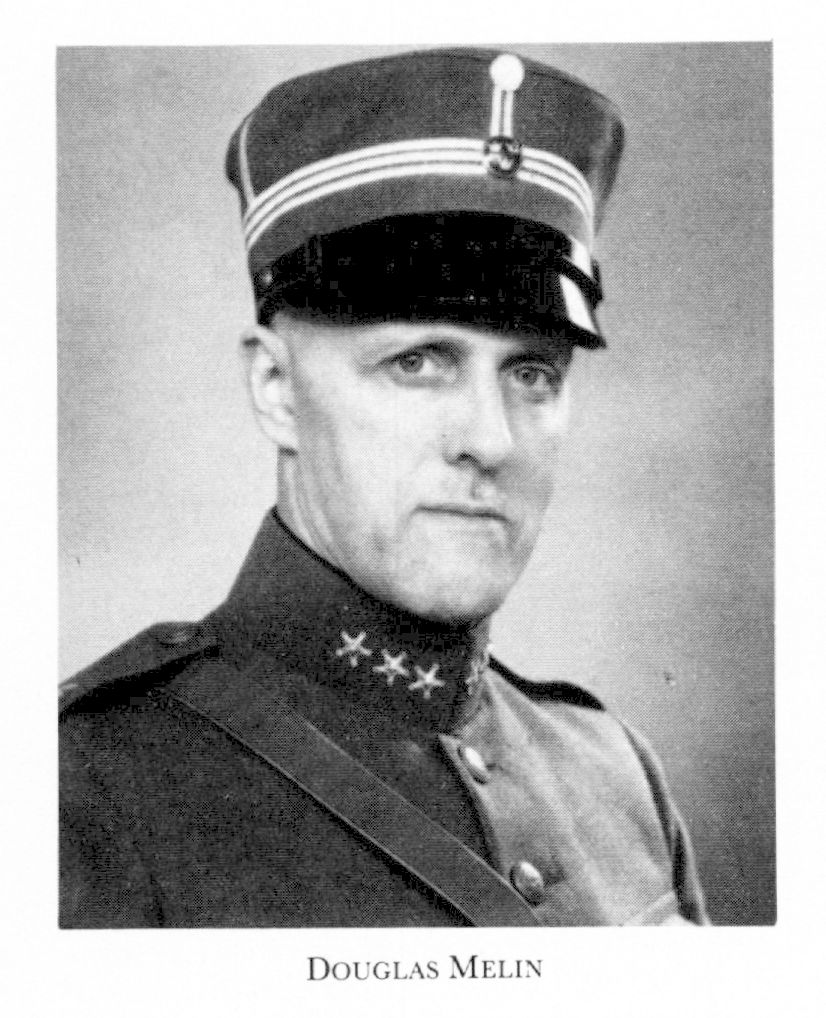
- Douglas Melin

Personal information
- Nationality: Swedish
- Born: 4 October 1895 Gothenburg, Sweden
- Died: 29 March 1946 (aged 50) Uppsala, Sweden

Sport
- Sport: Athletics
- Event: Long jump

Douglas Melin
- Education: Uppsala University
- Known for: Expedition to Brazil and Peru (1923–26)
- Scientific career
- Fields: Zoology: entomology, herpetology
- Workplaces: Uppsala University
- Thesis: Contributions to the knowledge of the biology, metamorphosis and distribution of the Swedish Asilids in relation to the whole family of Asilids (1923)

Douglas Edvard Melin (4 October 1895 – 29 March 1946) was a Swedish zoologist and athlete. He was the nephew of Olof Melin.

== Athletic career ==
He competed in the men's standing long jump at the 1912 Summer Olympics. He was also an avid boxer.

== Scientific career ==
Melin was an all-sided zoologist who got his education at the Uppsala University and spent his career there. In 1923–26 he led an expedition to Brazil and Peru, which resulted in a large number of zoological specimens as well as ethnographic and cartographic observations. Melin was skeptical about Darwin's theories, which led to his isolation as a scientist.
