= São José do Calçado =

Coordinates: 21°01′30″S 41°39′14″W

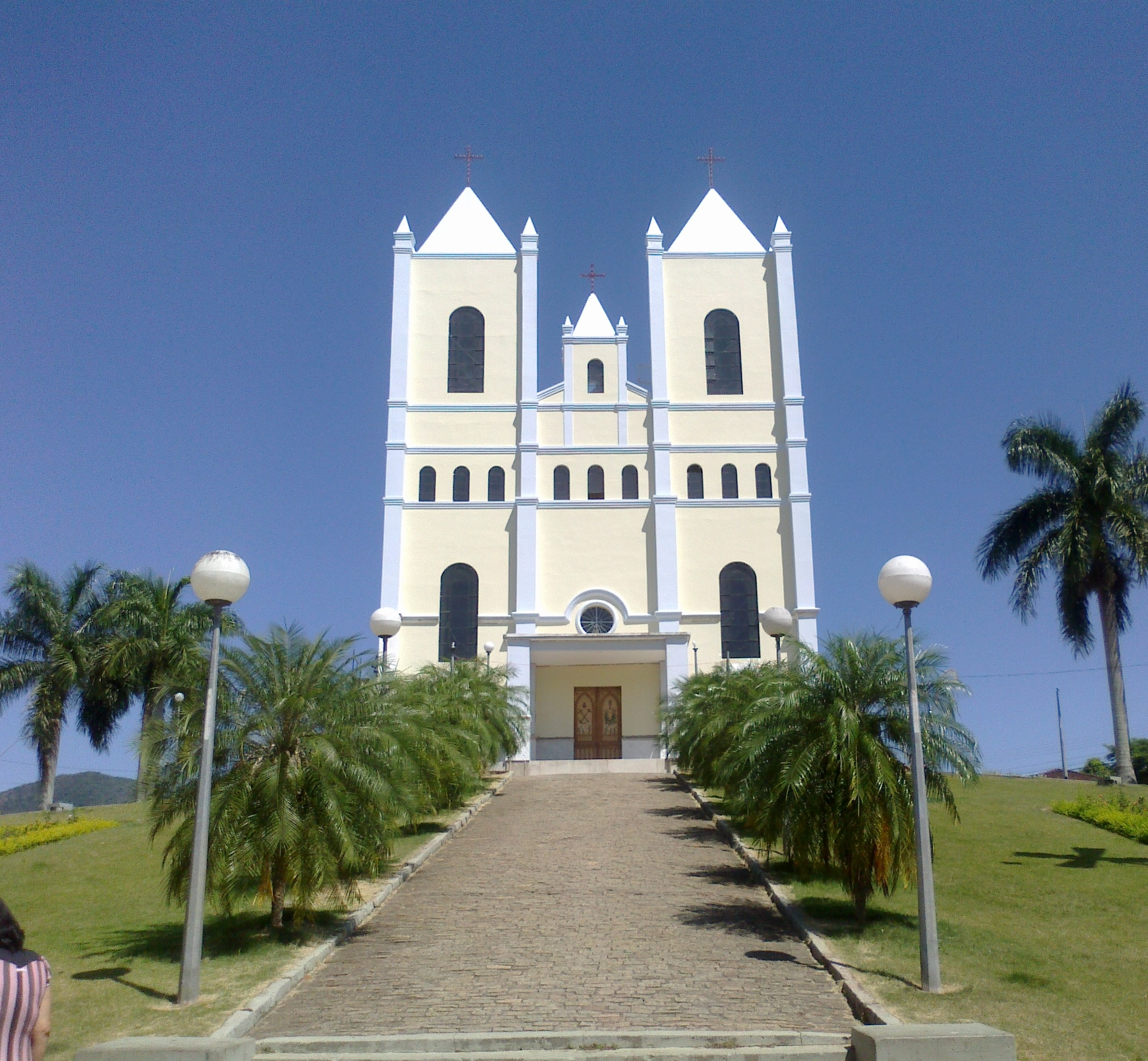

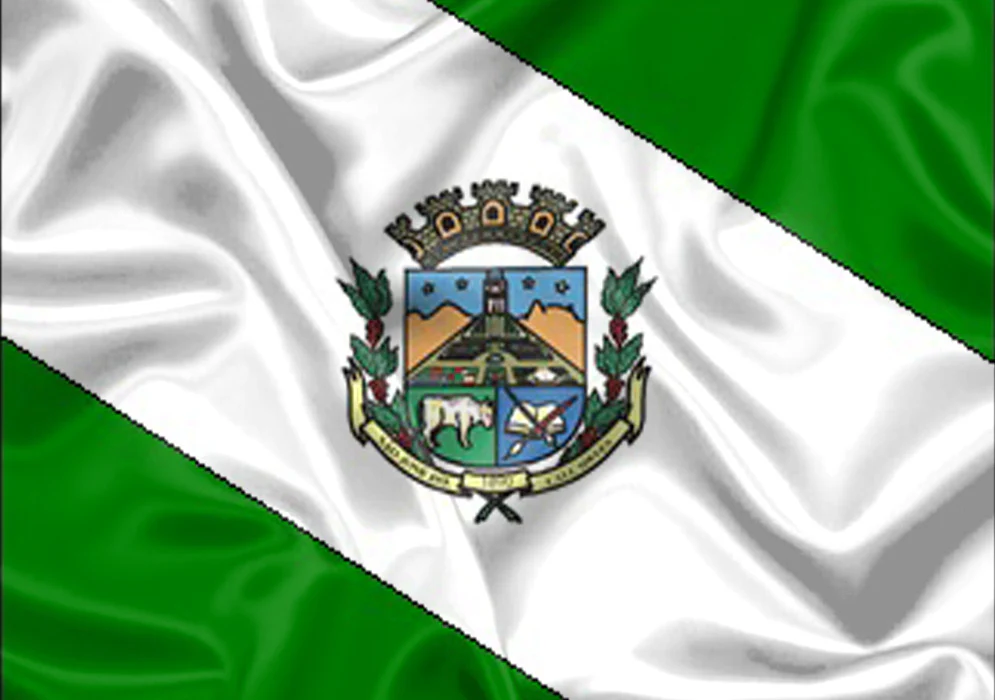
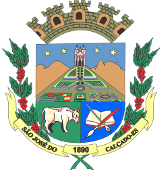
- Flag Coat of arms

- Founded: 5 November 1855

Area
  - Total: 272.771 km^{2} (105.317 sq mi)

Population (2020)
  - Total: 10,546
  - Density: 38.662/km^{2} (100.14/sq mi)

São José do Calçado is a municipality located in the Brazilian state of Espírito Santo. Its population was 10,546 (2020) and its area is 273 km^{2} (105 sq mi).

== See also ==
- List of municipalities in Espírito Santo
