= Olof Melin =

Olof Werling Melin
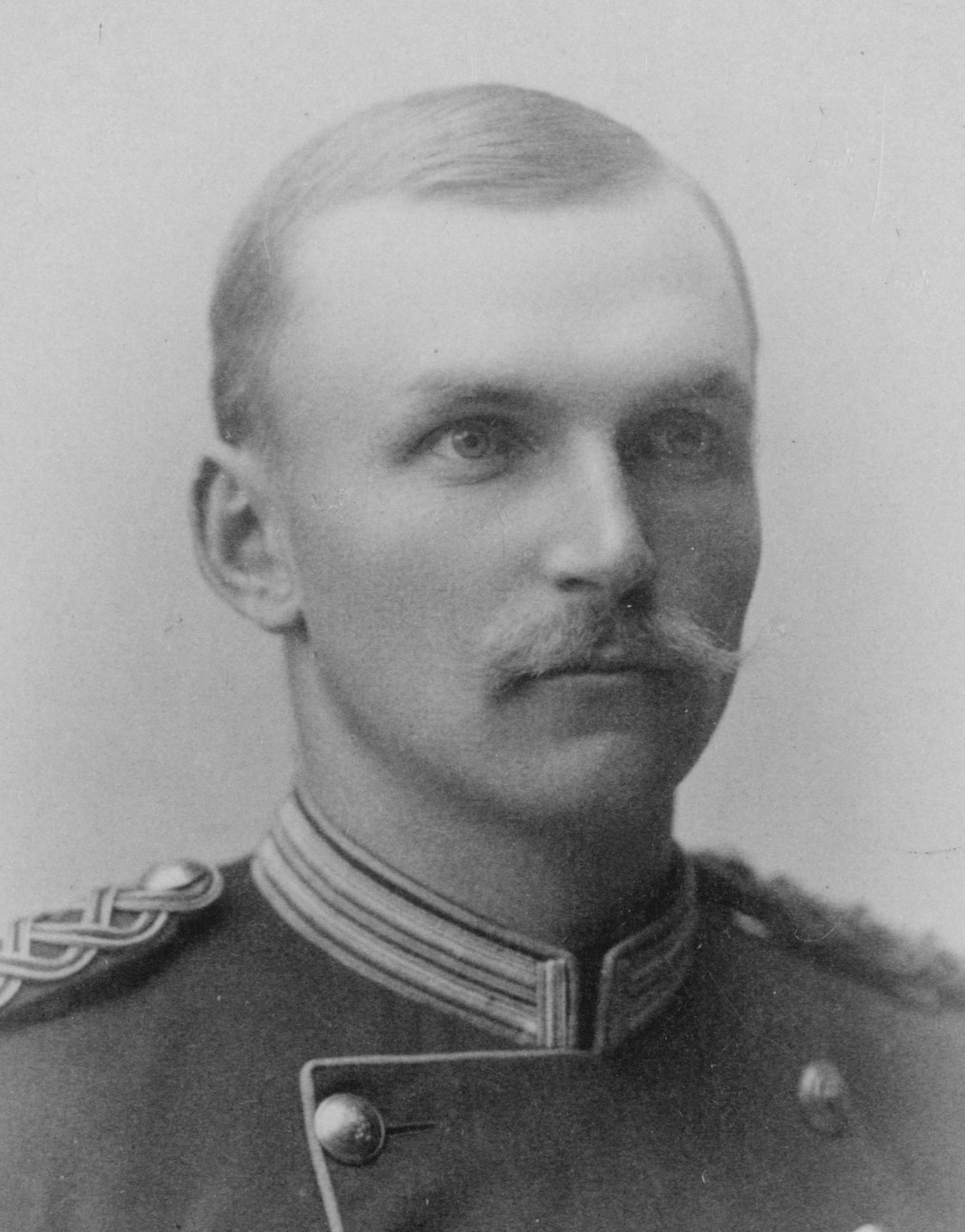
- Olof Werling Melin
- Born: 3 August 1861; Gothenburg, Sweden
- Died: 15 January 1940 (aged 78); Stockholm, Sweden
- Known for: Melin Shorthand

Olof Werling Melin (3 August 1861 – 15 January 1940) was a Swedish colonel and the creator of Melin Shorthand, the dominant shorthand system in Sweden.

== Biography ==
Melin was born in Gothenburg, Sweden. Melin taught the Gabelsberger shorthand system in the Swedish Army. Being dissatisfied with it, he created an alternative system subsequently called Melin Shorthand. This system quickly became the dominant shorthand system in Sweden.

Olof Melin also published several books. The most notable among them are Stenografiens historia, första delen and Stenografiens historia, andra delen (The history of shorthand – Part I and Part II), which can be regarded as his Magnum Opus. In these two books Melin described the history of shorthand from the ancient Greece to modern times.

== Bibliography ==
- Melin, O.W. (1892). Förenklad snabbskrift. Stockholm. (The first publication of Melin Shorthand).
- Melin, O.W. (1927). Stenografiens historia, första delen. Stockholm.
- Melin, O.W. (1929). Stenografiens historia, andra delen. Stockholm.

== See also ==
- Shorthand
- Melin Shorthand
