= Bom Jesus do Norte =

- Municipality
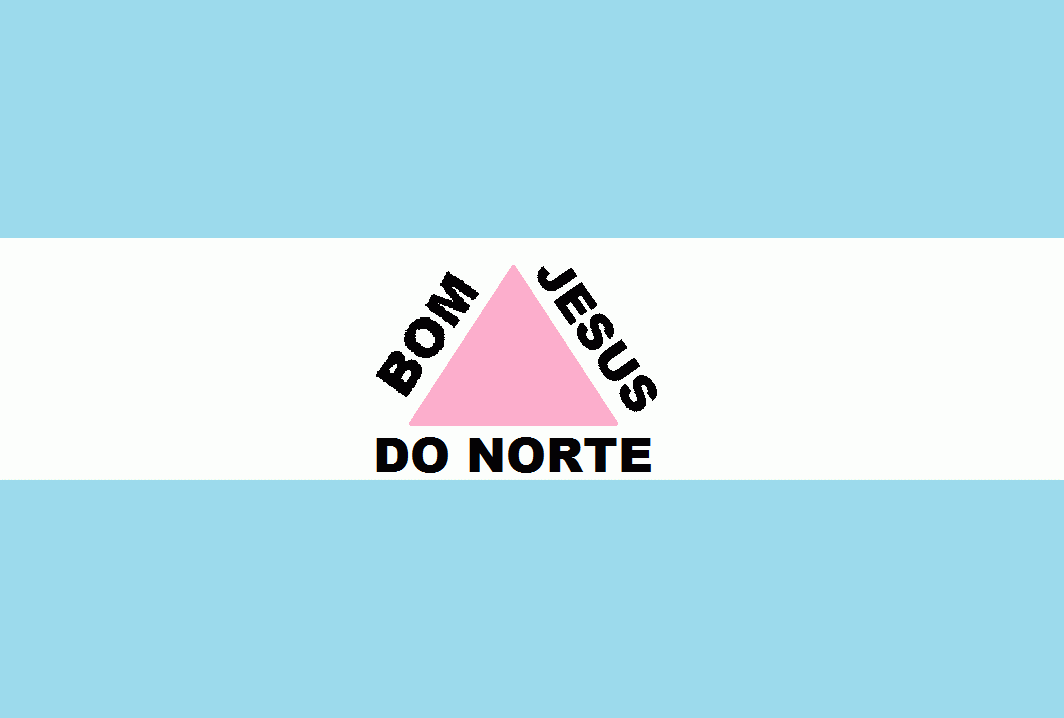
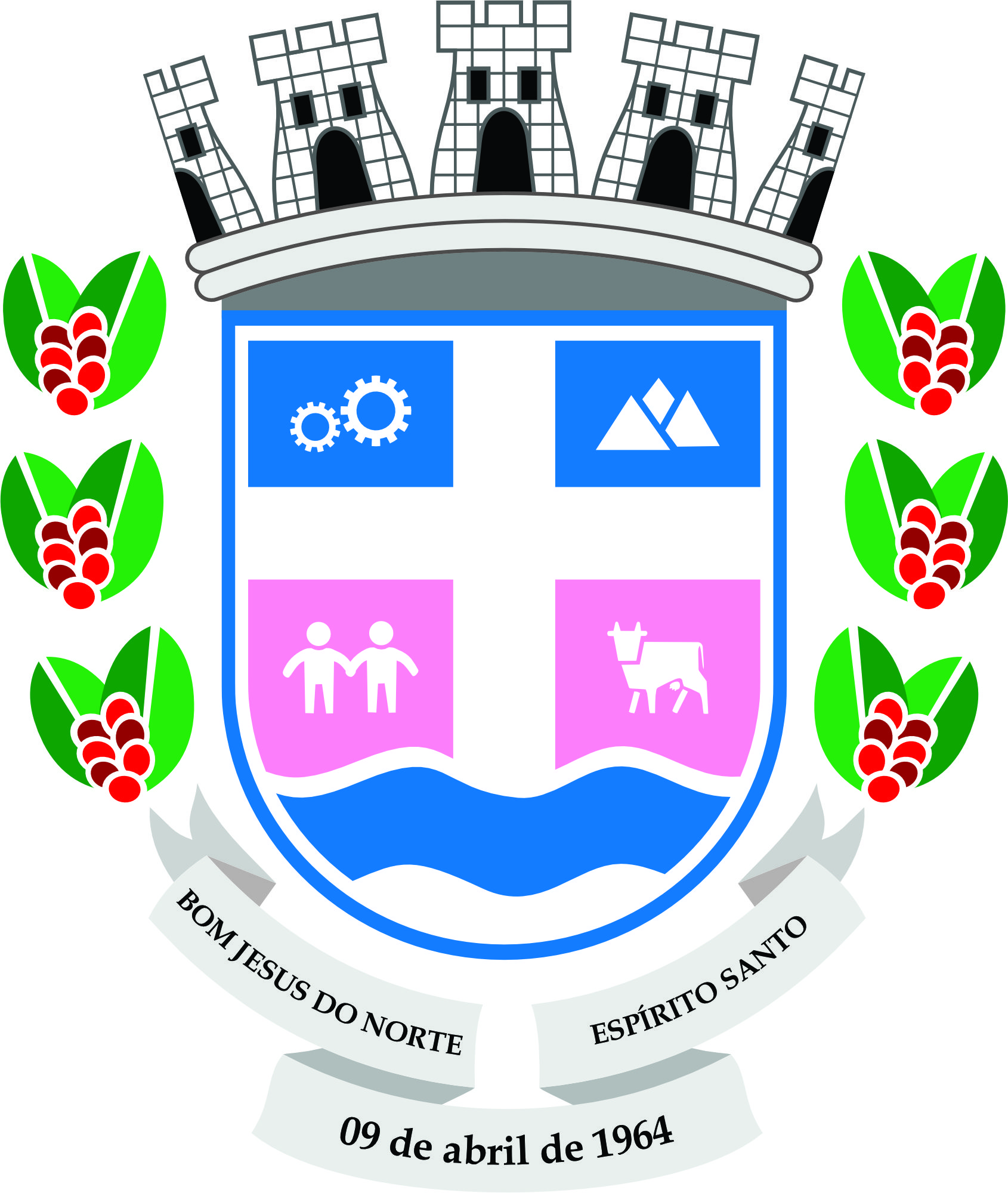
- Flag Coat of arms

- Location in Espírito Santo state

- Location in Brazil
- Coordinates: 21°6′50″S 41°40′19″W
- Country: Brazil
- Region: Southeast
- State: Espírito Santo

Area
  - Total: 89.0 km^{2} (34.4 sq mi)

Population (2020)
  - Total: 9,962
  - Density: 112/km^{2} (290/sq mi)
- Time zone: UTC−3 (BRT)

Bom Jesus do Norte is a municipality located in the Brazilian state of Espírito Santo. Its population was 9,962 (2020) and its area is 89.0 km^{2} (34.4 sq mi).
