= Mimoso do Sul =

Coordinates: 21°03′50″S 41°21′57″W

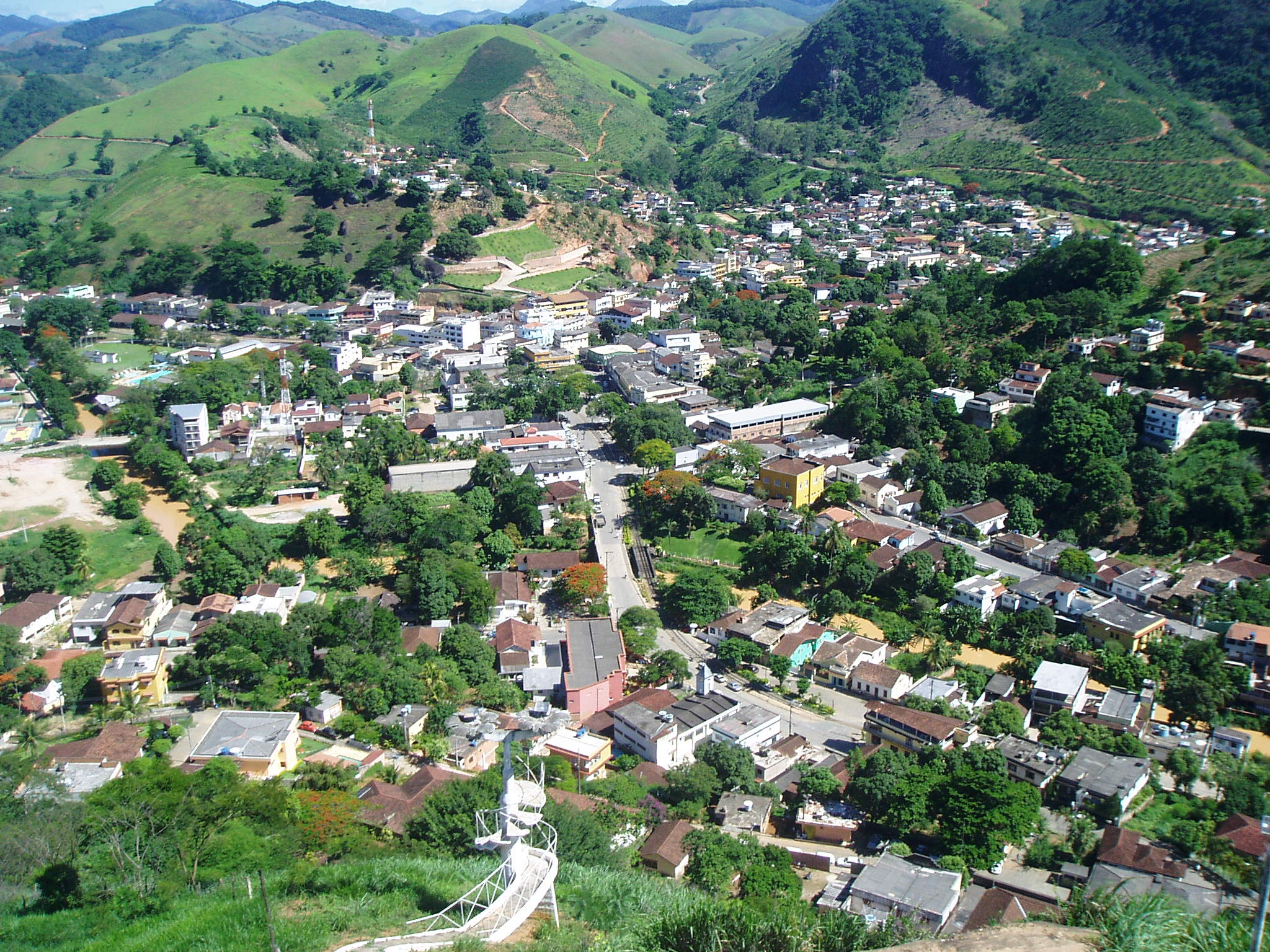

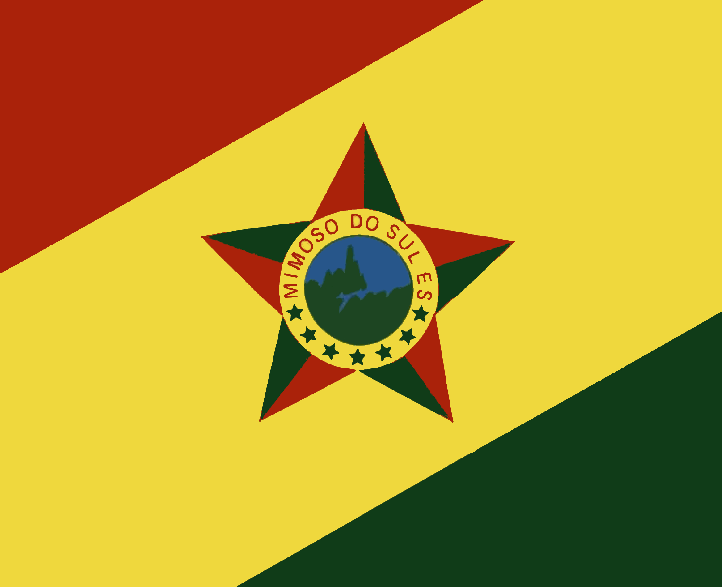
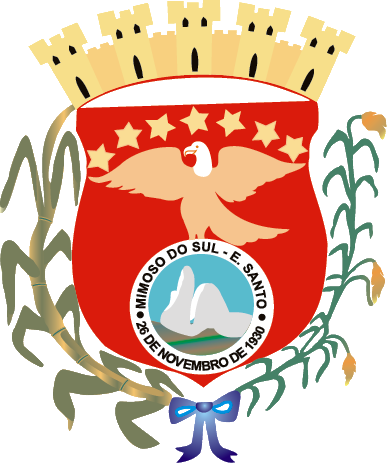
- Flag Coat of arms

- Established: 29 July 1887

Area
  - Total: 867.281 km^{2} (334.859 sq mi)

Population (2020)
  - Total: 26,115
  - Density: 30.111/km^{2} (77.988/sq mi)

Mimoso do Sul is a municipality located in the Brazilian state of Espírito Santo. Its population was 26,115 (2020) and its area is 867 km^{2} (335 sq mi).

The municipality contains part of the 10,459 hectares (25,840 acres) Serra das Torres Natural Monument, created in 2010 to protect the mountain peaks in the area.

== See also ==
- List of municipalities in Espírito Santo
