= Eugênio Izecksohn =

Brazilian herpetologist (1932–2013)

Eugênio Izecksohn (1932 – June 2013) was a Brazilian herpetologist. Izecksohn graduated from Universidade Federal Rural do Rio de Janeiro in 1953. Among others, he discovered and scientifically described the flea frog Brachycephalus didactylus, one of the smallest frogs in the world. Several taxa have been named in honour of him, mostly frogs like the tiny B. izecksohni, and the extremely rare—if not already extinct—Bokermannohyla izecksohni, but also a few from other groups like the fish Xenurolebias izecksohni and the bat Myotis izecksohni.
