= Bufoides kempi =

Conservation status
- Data Deficient (IUCN 3.1)

Scientific classification
- Kingdom: Animalia
- Phylum: Chordata
- Class: Amphibia
- Order: Anura
- Family: Bufonidae
- Genus: Bufoides
- Species: B. kempi

Binomial name
- Bufoides kempi (Boulenger, 1919)

Synonyms
- Nectophryne kempi Boulenger, 1919; Pedostibes kempi (Boulenger, 1919)

Species of amphibian

Bufoides kempi is a species of true toad, family Bufonidae. This poorly known species is endemic to Meghalaya, Northeast India. It is only known with certainty from its type series (two syntypes) collected "above Tura" at 2,500 ft (760 m) in the Garo Hills no later than 1919; there is also a possible record collected at around 2009. Its common names are Kemp's Asian tree toad, Garo Hills toad, and Garo Hills tree toad. The specific name kempi honours Stanley Wells Kemp, an English zoologist and anthropologist.

== Taxonomy and systematics ==
The species was described in 1919 by George Albert Boulenger as Nectophryne kempi. Thomas Barbour placed it in Pedostibes instead. In 2016, Chandramouli and Amarasinghe transferred it to Bufoides based on shared morphological characteristics with Bufoides meghalayanus. They might even represent the same species; however, new material would be needed to settle this question.

== Description ==
The types measure 30 and 17 mm (1.2 and 0.7 in) in snout–vent length; the smaller one is a sub-adult and both are unsexed. The snout is rounded. No tympanum is visible. The parotoid glands are oval. The fingers have basal webbing and the toes moderate webbing. Both the fingers and the toes bare small terminal discs. Skin is granular with small, scattered warts. The granulation is most intense on the flanks; the dorsal granules are larger than ventral ones. The preserved specimens are black ventrally; the larger one has olive brown dorsum whereas the smaller one is black throughout.

If the 36-mm specimen collected from Tura at around 2009 is Bufoides kempi, then it represents the largest known specimen and a recent record of this species.

== Habitat and conservation ==
Little is known about the ecology and population status of this species. It is arboreal or rupicolous and associated with semi-evergreen forest. It probably breeds in streams. It is not known to occur in any protected area.
