= Sabahphrynus =

Conservation status
- Endangered (IUCN 3.1)

Scientific classification
- Kingdom: Animalia
- Phylum: Chordata
- Class: Amphibia
- Order: Anura
- Family: Bufonidae
- Genus: Sabahphrynus; Matsui, Yambun, and Sudin, 2007
- Species: S. maculatus

Binomial name
- Sabahphrynus maculatus (Mocquard, 1890)

Synonyms
- Nectophryne maculata Mocquard, 1890 (type); Pedostibes maculatus (Mocquard, 1890); Ansonia anotis Inger, Tan, and Yambun, 2001

Genus of amphibians

Sabahphrynus is a monotypic genus of amphibians in the family Bufonidae. The sole species is Sabahphrynus maculatus, also known as the spotted Asian tree toad or Sabah earless toad. It is endemic to Borneo where it is only known from Sabah, East Malaysia.

== Taxonomy ==
Sabahphrynus, as currently understood, results from recognizing two little-known species, Pedostibes maculatus and Ansonia anotis, as conspecific. This taxon seems to be more closely related to Leptophryne, Ingerophrynus, and Didynamipus than to Ansonia and Pedostibes, although its exact closest relatives remain uncertain. In addition to being genetically a distinct lineage among Southeast Asian bufonids, it is also morphologically unique: it lacks middle-ear structures and tympanum.

== Description ==
Sabahphrynus maculatus males grow to at least 39 mm (1.5 in) and females to 52 mm (2.0 in) in snout–vent length. The head has no bony crests and the parotoid glands are absent. The outer finger tips are expanded into spatulate discs. The subarticular tubercles are present, but weak. The webbing of toe is moderately developed. The males lack vocal sac opening and mandibular spines. The dorsum, at least in males, is light green.

== Habitat and distribution ==
Sabahphrynus maculatus are found in the western lower montane Sabah, Borneo. Specimens are known from the Kinabalu Park, Crocker Range National Park, and Ulu Kimanis in the Crocker Range. They occur near small streams, perching a few metres above ground on tree trunks as well as on logs and rocks adjacent to streams.
