= Dwarf toad =

Dwarf toad may refer to several different species or genera of amphibians.

Bufonidae – genera:

- Didynamipus Andersson, 1903
- Mertensophryne Tihen, 1960
- Pelophryne Barbour, 1938

Bufonidae – species:

- Anaxyrus debilis (Girard, 1854)
- Anaxyrus quercicus (Holbrook, 1840)
- Didynamipus sjostedti Andersson, 1903
- Duttaphrynus scaber (Schneider, 1799)
- Incilius canaliferus (Cope, 1877)
- Ingerophrynus parvus (Boulenger, 1887)
- Mertensophryne taitana (Peters, 1878)
- Pelophryne signata (Boulenger, 1895)

Pipidae – species:

- Pipa parva Ruthven and Gaige, 1923
