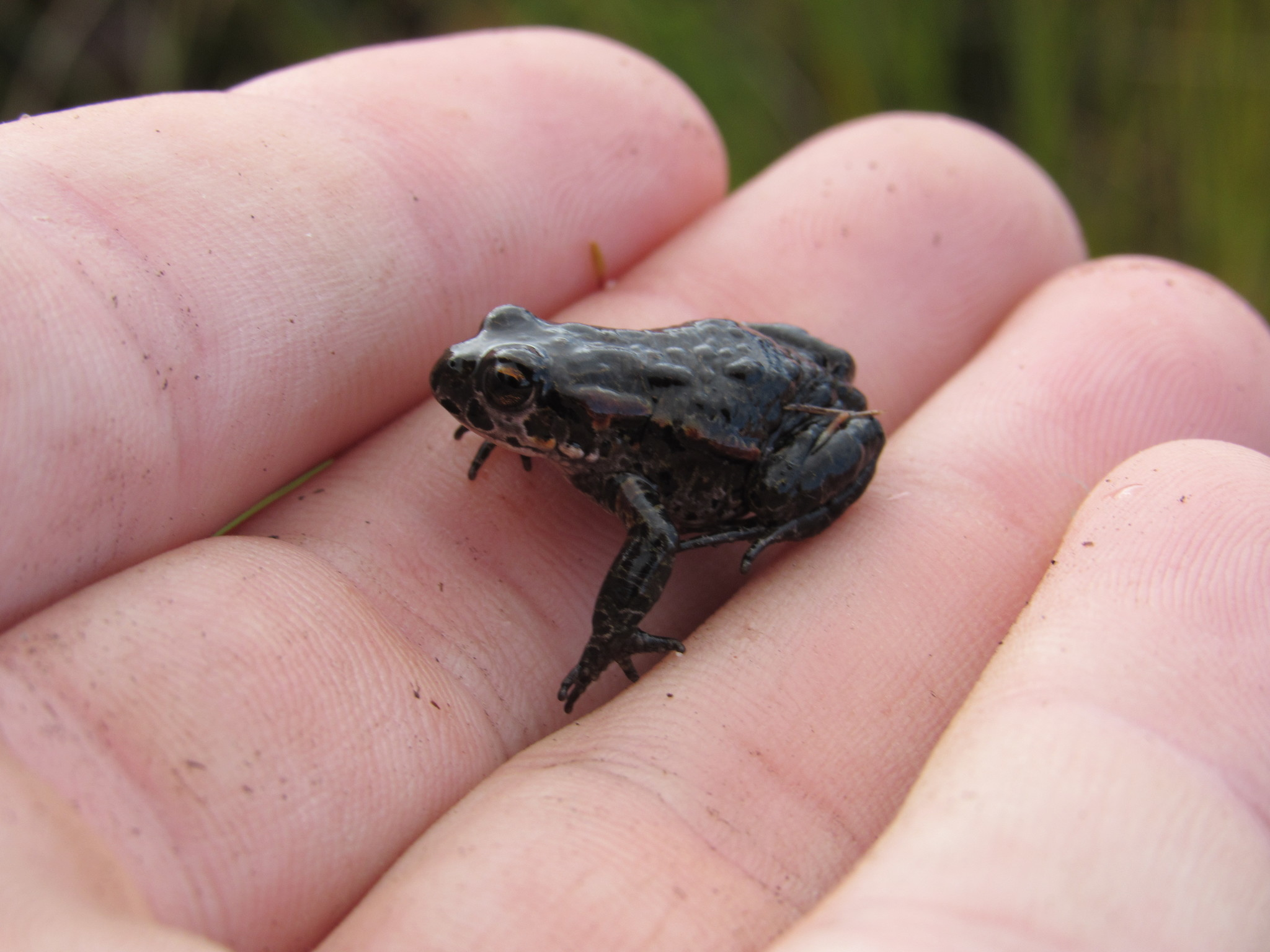
- C. rosei in Western Cape, South Africa

Conservation status
- Critically Endangered (IUCN 3.1)

Scientific classification
- Kingdom: Animalia
- Phylum: Chordata
- Class: Amphibia
- Order: Anura
- Family: Bufonidae
- Genus: Capensibufo
- Species: C. rosei

Binomial name
- Capensibufo rosei (Hewitt, 1926)

Synonyms
- Bufo rosei Hewitt, 1926

= Cape mountain toad =

Species of amphibian

The Cape mountain toad or Rose's mountain toad (Capensibufo rosei) is a species of toad in the family Bufonidae. Other common names include Rose's mountain toadlet, striped mountain toad, Rose's toad, and Muizenberg Cape toad. It is endemic to South Africa, where its natural habitat is Mediterranean-type shrubby vegetation known as fynbos. It is threatened by habitat loss.

== Description ==
Female Cape mountain toads grow to a length around 39 mm (1.5 in), while males are smaller at 28 mm (1.1 in). The body is relatively long, the hind limbs are short, and the toes are unwebbed. The dorsal surface is variably coloured in shades of grey or brown with a few paler streaks, and is smooth with scattered warts and blister-like ridges. The parotoid glands are obvious, but no tympani (eardrums) are visible, a fact which helps distinguish this species from the otherwise similar Capensibufo tradouwi. The ventral surface is white with dark blotches, and its posterior part has skin granulations. During the breeding season, an oval pink patch is seen underneath the vent.

== Distribution and habitat ==
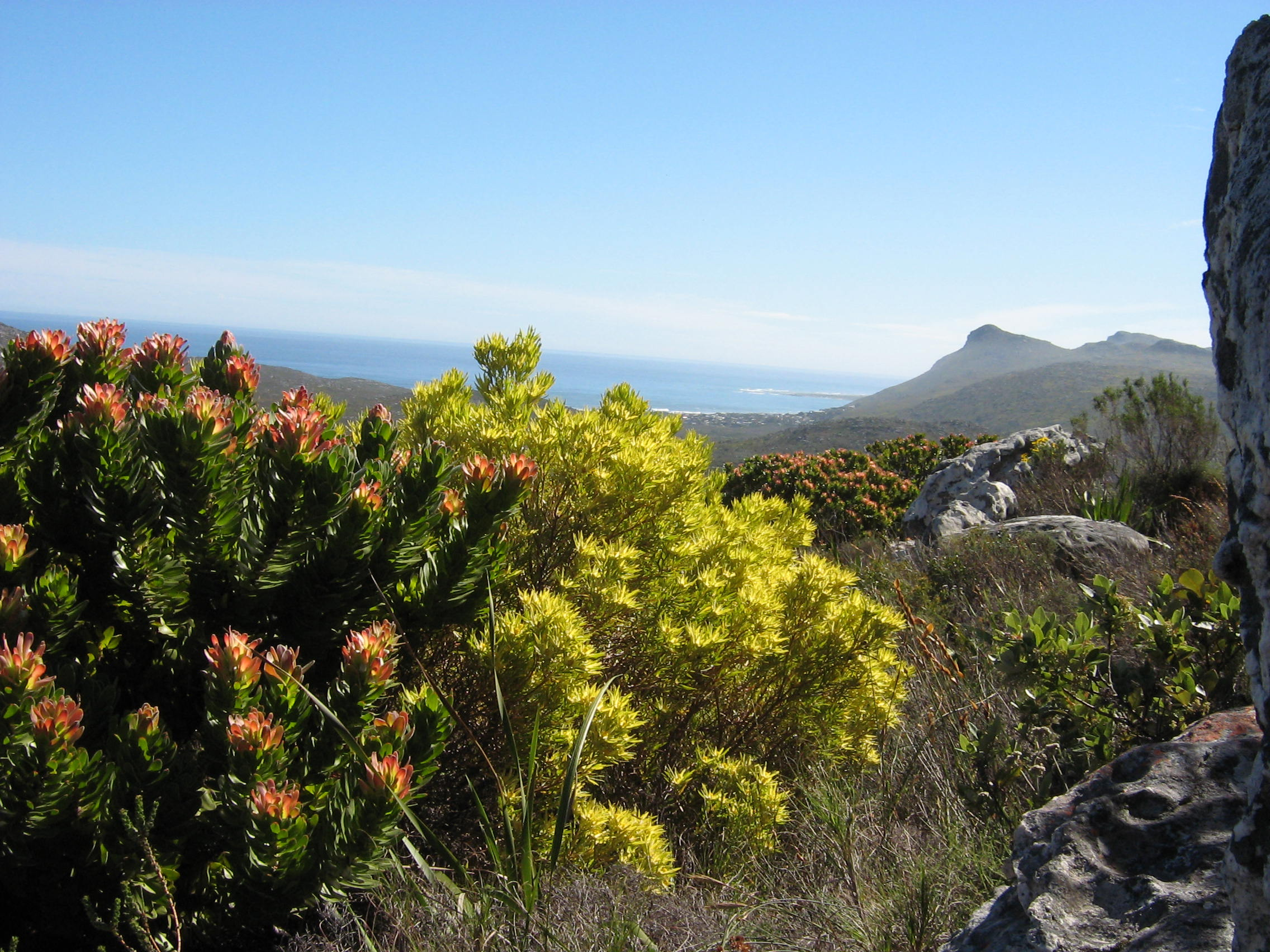
Typical mountain fynbos habitat

The Cape mountain toad is endemic to parts of the Western Cape province of South Africa, southwest of the Breede River and including the Cape Peninsula. This is a hilly area and has a Mediterranean-type climate with a rainy season in the winter. It has a distinctive, heathland vegetation known as fynbos, characterised by small evergreen, sclerophyllous plants including proteas and ericoid species, herbs, bulbous plants, and grasses, but not large trees. The Cape mountain toad is found at elevations of between 60 and 1,600 m (200 and 5,250 ft) above sea level, mostly at altitudes above 400 m (1,300 ft).

== Biology ==
Breeding takes place at the time of the winter rains when temporary shallow pools form. The males do not call to attract females, and this may be the only South African species of amphibian that lacks a voice. About one hundred eggs are laid in a gelatinous string and take about twelve days to hatch. The rate of growth of the tadpoles depends on the temperature and availability of food and metamorphosis into juvenile toads may occur about six weeks after hatching.

== Status ==
It is only found in fynbos heathland on the Cape and it does not seem to be adaptable to the changes in habitat associated with an increase in nonlocal plants and burning of the heathland that sometimes occurs. Although it is locally common at temporary pools in the breeding season, it occupies only about 2% of the suitable habitat in its range, is known from only two localities and is absent from many areas that seem suitable, including some where it was found in the past. A disjunct population of Capensibufo rosei was initially discovered on Table Mountain in the year 1927. However no activity has been observed for many decades and the current status of this separate population is unknown.
