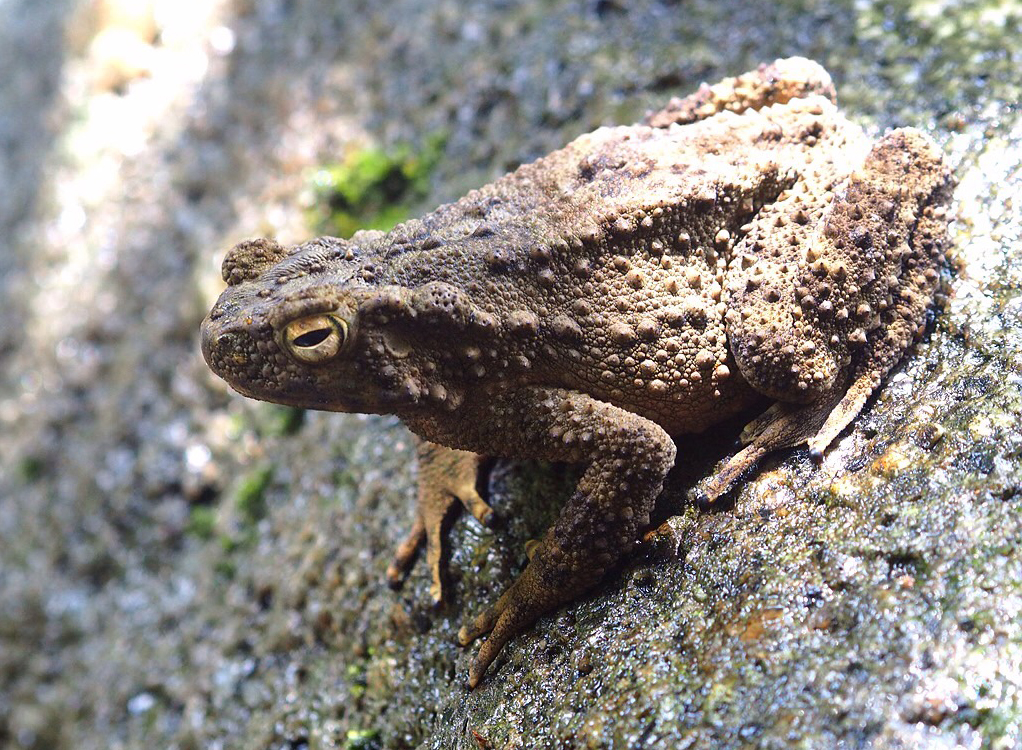
- Phrynoidis asper

Scientific classification
- Kingdom: Animalia
- Phylum: Chordata
- Class: Amphibia
- Order: Anura
- Family: Bufonidae
- Genus: Phrynoidis; Fitzinger, 1842

Type species
- Bufo asper Gravenhorst, 1829

= Phrynoidis =

Genus of amphibians

Phrynoidis is a small genus of true toads of the Bufonidae family. They are found in Mainland Southeast Asia and the Greater Sundas. They are sometimes known as the rough toad or the river toad.

== Systematics ==
Phrynoidis was included in Bufo until 2006. Their sister taxon is the genus Rentapia, which is formerly part of then Pedostibes genus.

== Description ==
Phrynoidis is a large toad with a maximum female snout–vent length of 121–215 mm (4.8–8.5 in), which differs based on the species. Additionally, male Phrynoidis are smaller than females. Finger tips are dilated into keratinized, bulbous tips. Supernumerary palmar tubercles are present. The fingers have basal webbing. The tadpoles have large oral disc that is as wide as the body. Phrynoidis toads are terrestrial riparian habitat generalists. Finally, they lay very large clutches of eggs.

== Species ==
There are two species:

- Phrynoidis asper (Gravenhorst, 1829)
- Phrynoidis juxtasper (Inger, 1964)
