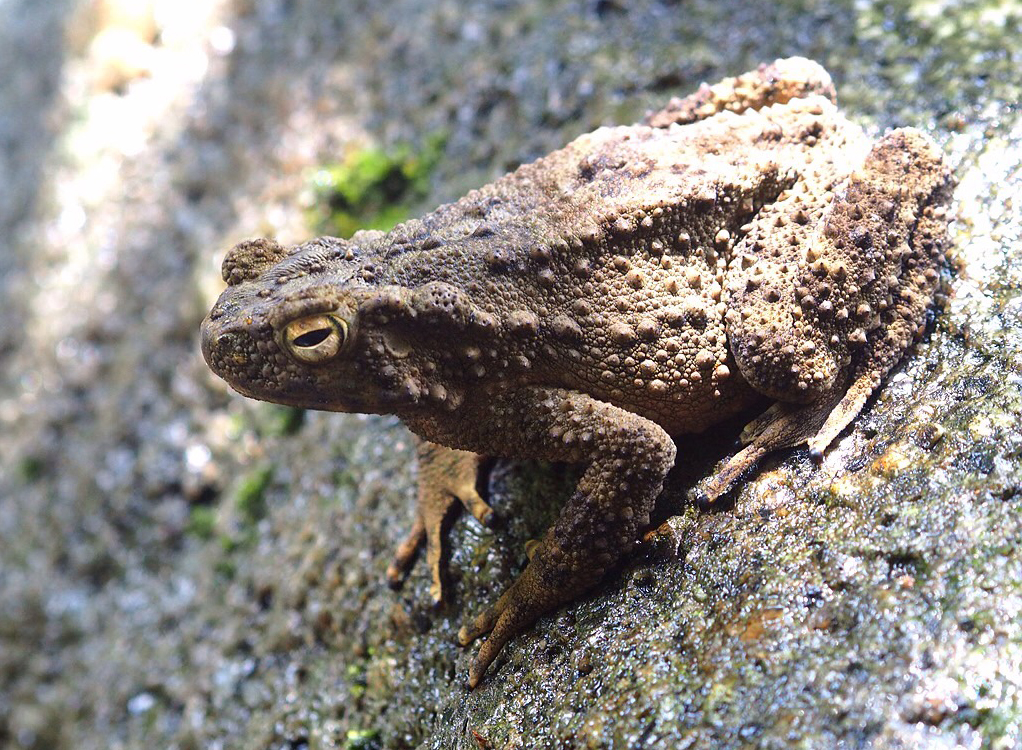
- An Asian giant toad from Nakhon Si Thammarat, Thailand

Conservation status
- Least Concern (IUCN 3.1)

Scientific classification
- Kingdom: Animalia
- Phylum: Chordata
- Class: Amphibia
- Order: Anura
- Family: Bufonidae
- Genus: Phrynoidis
- Species: P. asper

Binomial name
- Phrynoidis asper (Gravenhorst, 1829)

Synonyms
- Bufo asper Gravenhorst, 1829; Phrynoidis aspera (Gravenhorst, 1829)

= Phrynoidis asper =

Species of amphibian

The Asian giant toad (Phrynoidis asper), sometimes referred to as the river toad, is a species of true toad native to Mainland Southeast Asia and the Greater Sundas. It is a medium-large toad, but it is easily confused with its larger relative, the giant river toad (P. juxtasper).

== Description ==
Phrynoidis asper is generally a dark grey, green, black or brown in color, and is heavily covered in tubercles. Females can reach up to 14 cm (5.5 in) in snout–to–vent length and males up to 10 cm (3.9 in). They can be commonly found near stream and rivers.

== Gallery ==
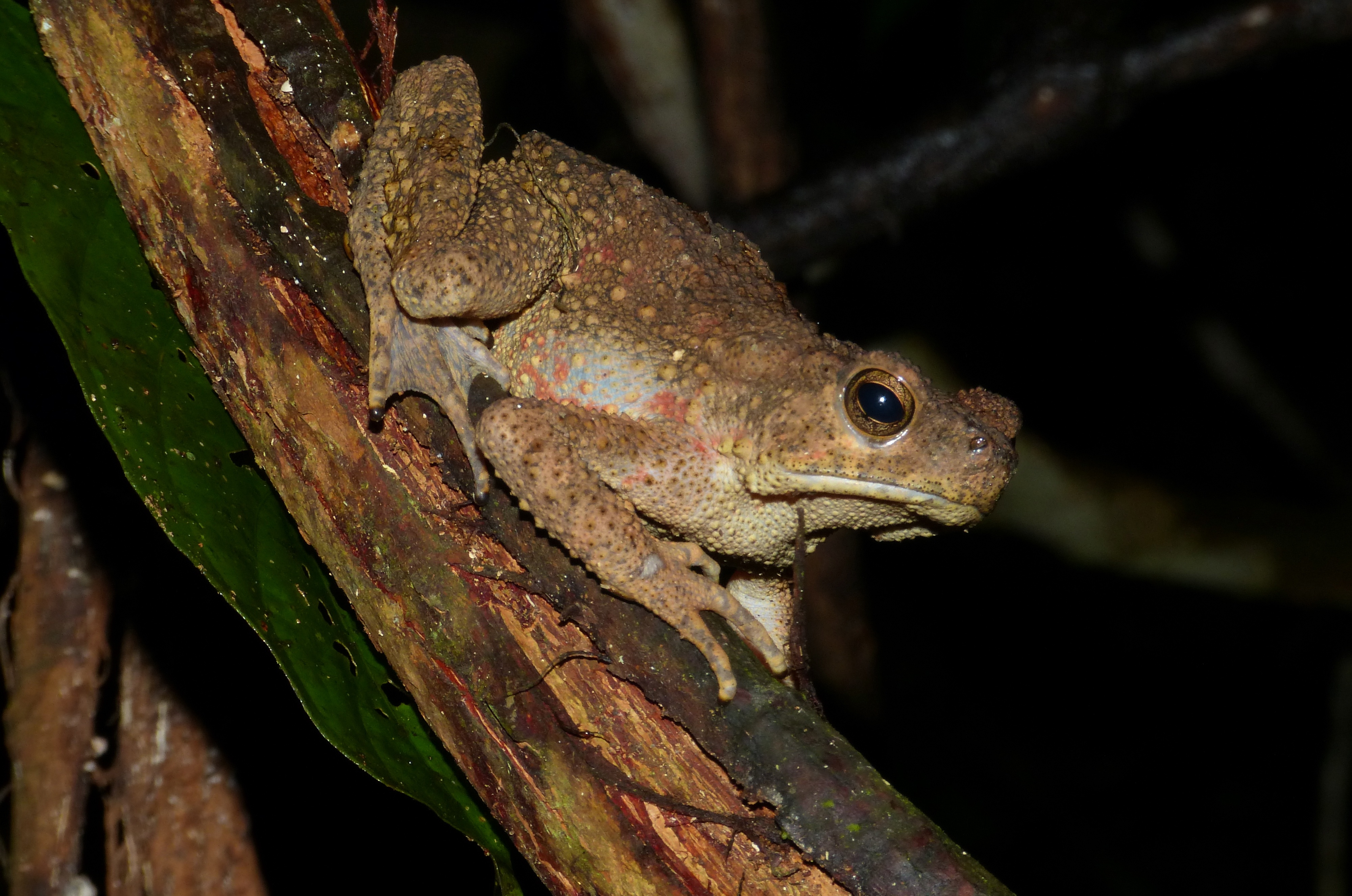

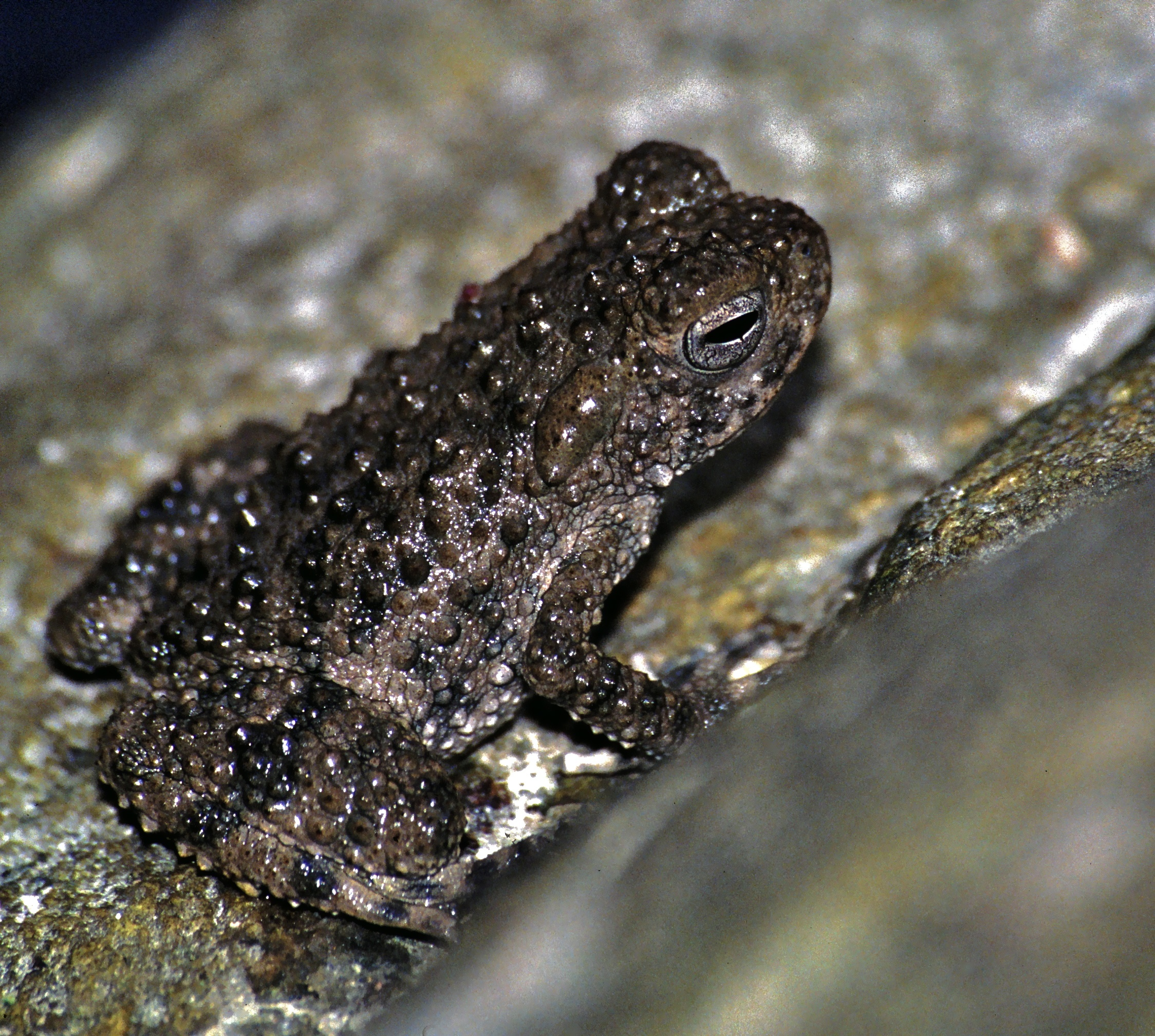

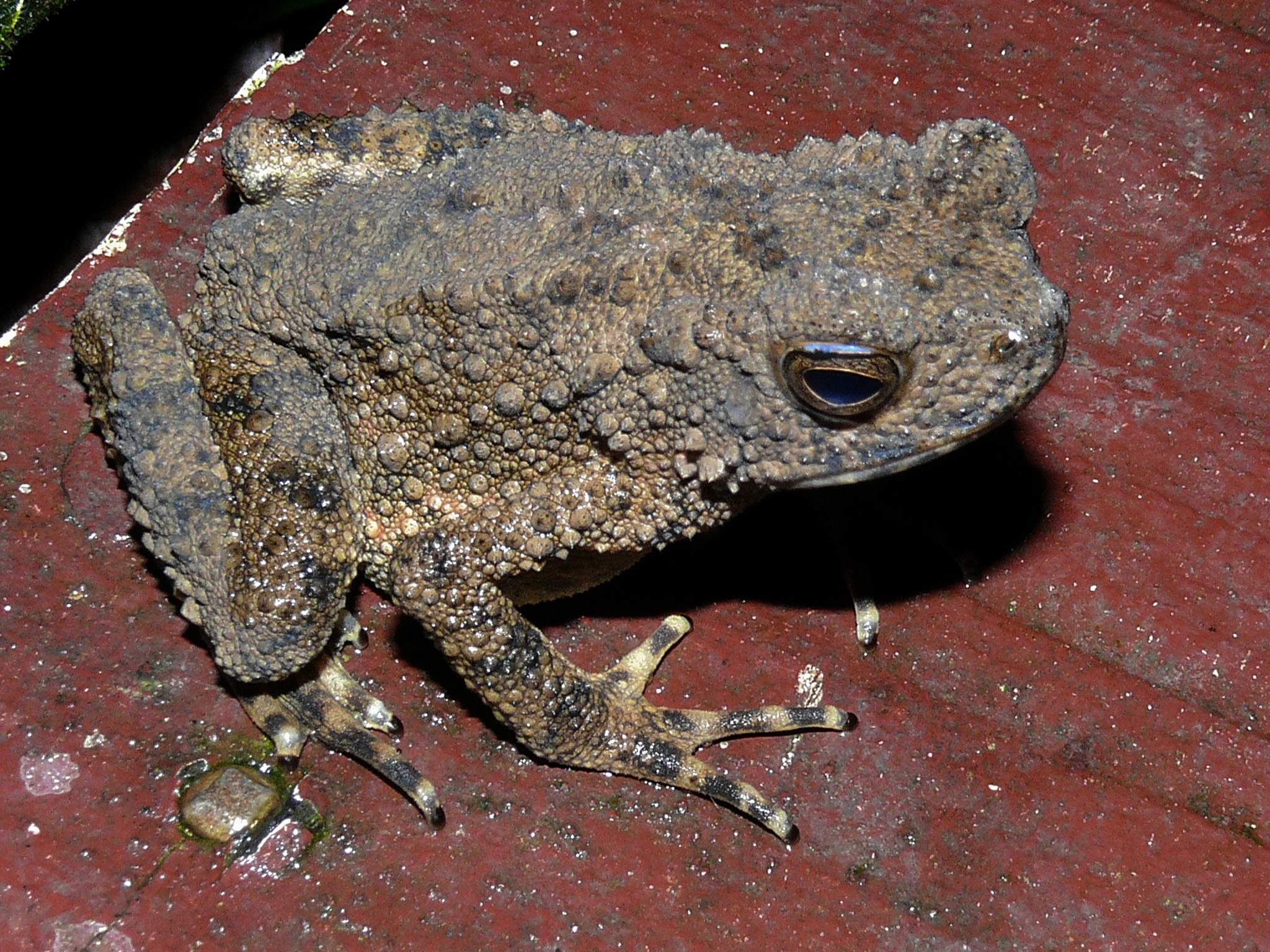
