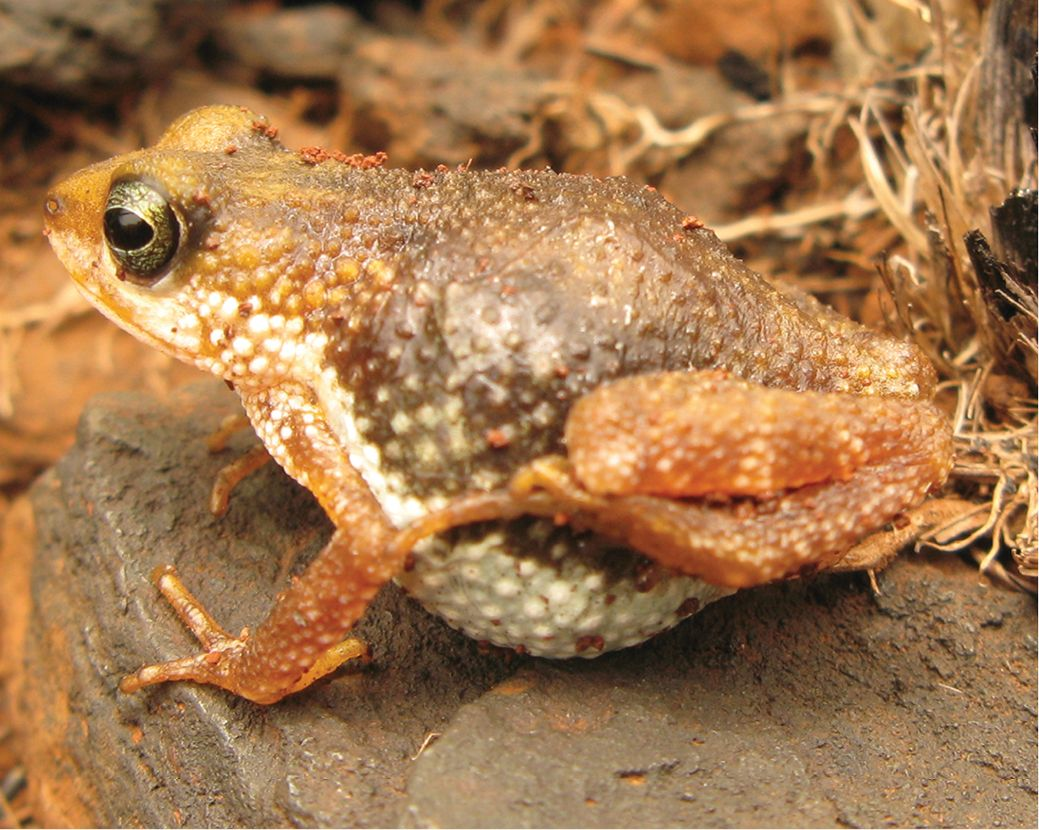
- Gestating female

Conservation status
- Critically Endangered (IUCN 3.1)
- CITES Appendix I

Scientific classification
- Kingdom: Animalia
- Phylum: Chordata
- Class: Amphibia
- Order: Anura
- Family: Bufonidae
- Genus: Nimbaphrynoides; Dubois, 1987
- Species: N. occidentalis

Binomial name
- Nimbaphrynoides occidentalis (Angel, 1943)

Synonyms
- Nectophrynoides occidentalis Angel, 1943; Nectophrynoides liberiensis Xavier, 1979 "1978"; Nimbaphrynoides liberiensis (Xavier, 1979)

= Nimbaphrynoides =

Genus of amphibians

Nimbaphrynoides is a monotypic genus of true toads from highlands in the Mount Nimba region of the West African countries of Guinea, Liberia, and Côte d'Ivoire. The sole species is Nimbaphrynoides occidentalis. Along with Nectophrynoides, Eleutherodactylus jasperi, and Limnonectes larvaepartus, Nimbaphrynoides is one of the only anurans that combine internal fertilization with ovoviviparity.

== Taxonomy and systematics ==
Nimbaphrynoides occidentalis was first described as Nectophrynoides occidentalis by Fernand Angel in 1943. A second species from Mount Nimba, Nectophrynoides liberiensis, was described in 1979. The two were then transferred to a newly erected genus Nimbaphrynoides in 1987. The two species were similar except for the larger size of N. liberiensis compared to N. occidentalis and some small colour differences. However, their calls are similar, and the genetic differences are minor. On this basis, they have been judged to be the same species. However, acknowledging the significant differences in size and that small genetic differences do exist, they are still retained as subspecies:

- Nimbaphrynoides occidentalis occidentalis (Angel, 1943) — Western Nimba toad, Mount Nimba viviparous toad
- Nimbaphrynoides occidentalis liberiensis (Xavier, 1979) — Liberia Nimba toad

== Description ==
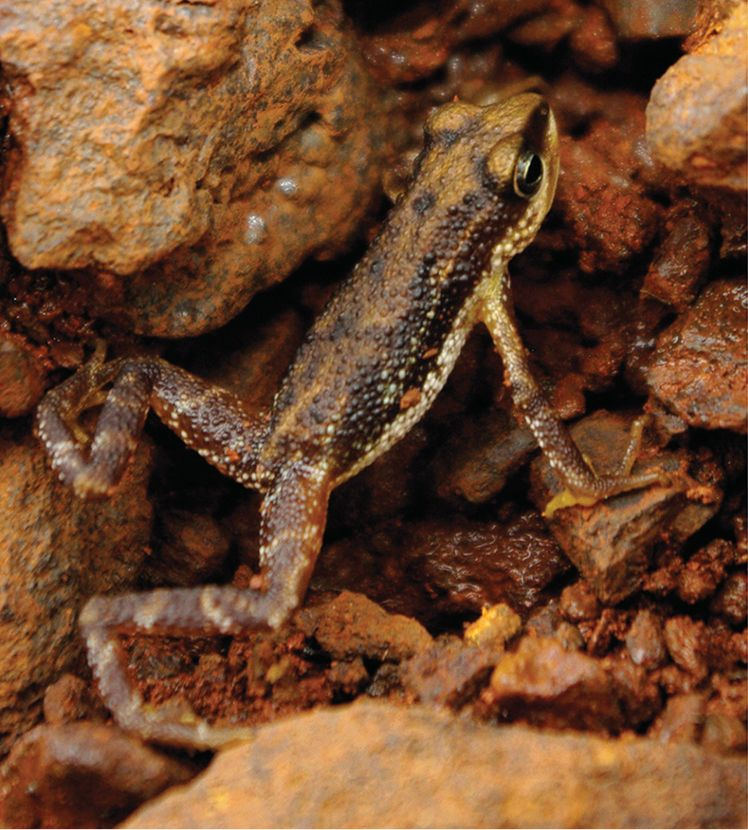
Young female towards the end of the rainy season

Adult males of Nimbaphrynoides occidentalis occidentalis measure on average 18 mm (0.7 in) and adult females on average 20.5 mm (0.8 in) in snout–vent length. Nimbaphrynoides occidentalis liberiensis are larger at respectively 22.4 and 28.7 mm (0.9 and 1.1 in). Adult colouration is variable. The dorsum in most individuals is brown to black backs, without a distinct border between the two colours. It may also be uniform in colouration, or have lighter and darker browns irregularly mixed. There are some lighter areas in the head, at least on the snout and the eye-lids. The legs are light brown with irregularly bordered darker stripes or dots. The venter is typically white, but some Nimbaphrynoides occidentalis liberiensis have small to large light brown dots on their venter. Juveniles had brighter coloured backs than adults.

== Reproduction ==
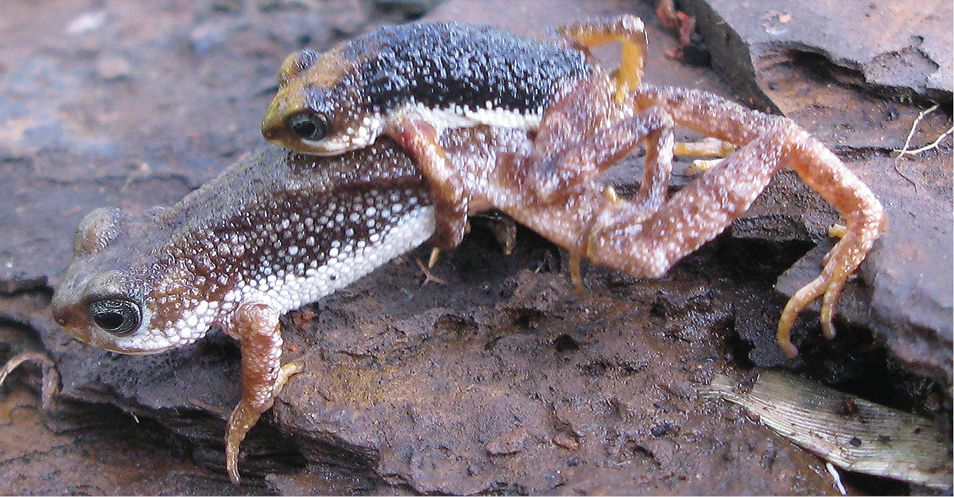
Female and male in amplexus

The male advertisement call is very faint, short, and resembles a metallic "bing". Nimbaphrynoides are viviparous—they have internal fertilisation and the female gives birth to fully developed, tiny toadlets. Eggs are small, ranging from 0.5–0.6 mm in diameter.

== Habitat and conservation ==
Nimbaphrynoides occur in montane grasslands at elevations of 1,200–1,680 m (3,940–5,510 ft) above sea level. It is not tolerant to disturbance, and recent observations are from less impacted areas where soil was not compacted or little compacted. It can be locally very common, but the population is severely fragmented. The area has been affected by mining, and the type locality of Nimbaphrynoides occidentalis liberiensis is now an open cast mining pit. Future threats include a proposed iron ore mining concession and the arrival of a large contingent of refugees. Part of the population is protected by the Mount Nimba Strict Nature Reserve, although improved management of the site is required.
