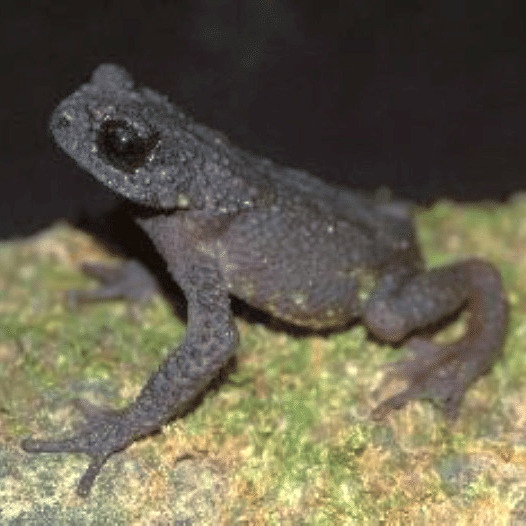
- Bufoides meghalayanus

Scientific classification
- Kingdom: Animalia
- Phylum: Chordata
- Class: Amphibia
- Order: Anura
- Family: Bufonidae
- Genus: Bufoides; Pillai and Yazdani, 1973

Type species
- Ansonia meghalayana Yazdani and Chanda, 1971

= Bufoides =

Genus of amphibians

Bufoides is a small genus of true toads, family Bufonidae. The genus is endemic to Northeast India, with one species known from the Garo and Khasi Hills.

== Taxonomy and systematics ==
Bufoides was erected in 1973 to accommodate Ansonia meghalayana. It remained monotypic until 2016 when Chandramouli and Amarasinghe transferred Pedostibes kempi to Bufoides, in their quest to achieve monophyletic Pedostibes. The move was supported by the morphological similarity and geographic proximity of the two species, and rendered Pedostibes monotypic and restricted to the Western Ghats. However, it remains possible that the two Bufoides species are actually conspecific. The closest relatives of the genus remain unknown.

== Description ==
Bufoides are small toads; the maximum sizes of the two species are 30 and 47 mm (1.2 and 1.9 in) in snout–vent length. Supraorbital, preorbital, and postorbital ridges are present. The parotoid glands are short and oval. No externally visible tympanum is present. The tips of the digits have rounded, poorly dilated discs. Dorsal skin is granular. The fingers have basal webbing whereas the toes have complete webbing.

== Species ==
There are three recognized species:

- Bufoides kempi (Boulenger, 1919)
- Bufoides meghalayanus (Yazdani and Chanda, 1971)
- Bufoides bhupathyi Naveen, Tapley, Chandramouli, Jervis, Babu, Meetei & Karunakaran, 2023
