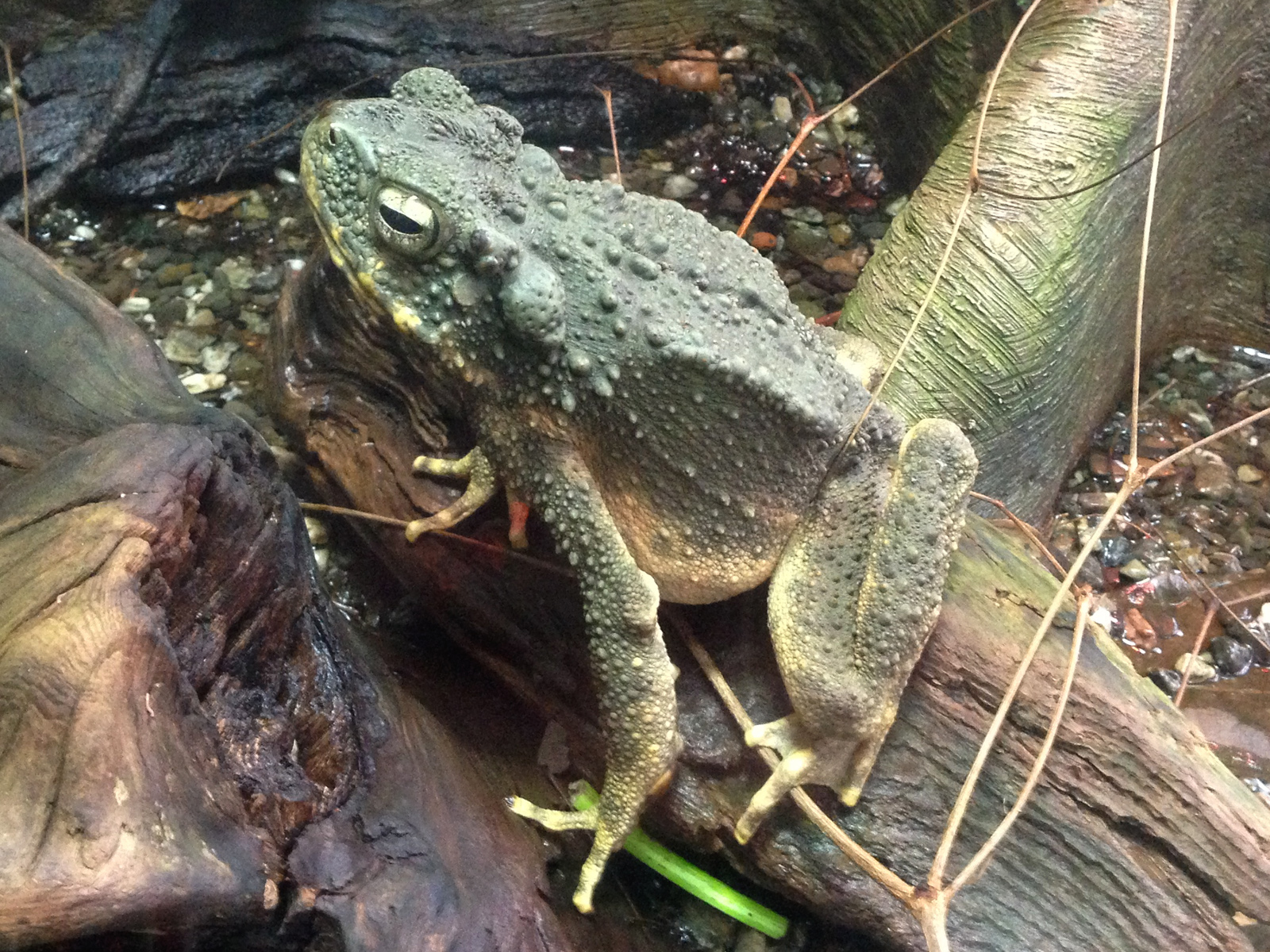

Conservation status
- Least Concern (IUCN 3.1)

Scientific classification
- Kingdom: Animalia
- Phylum: Chordata
- Class: Amphibia
- Order: Anura
- Family: Bufonidae
- Genus: Phrynoidis
- Species: P. juxtasper

Binomial name
- Phrynoidis juxtasper (Inger, 1964)

Synonyms
- Bufo juxtasper Inger, 1964; Phrynoidis juxtaspera (Inger, 1964)

= Phrynoidis juxtasper =

Species of amphibian

Phrynoidis juxtasper, also known as the giant river toad or Borneo river toad, is a species of toad in the family Bufonidae. It is found in Borneo (Brunei, Indonesia, and Malaysia) and Sumatra (Indonesia) below 1,600 m (5,200 ft) asl. Prior to its species description, it was confused with Phrynoidis asper (hence the specific name juxtasper, from Latin juxta- meaning "near to").

== Description ==
Phrynoidis juxtasper are large toads: males grow to 122 mm (4.8 in) and females to 215 mm (8.5 in) in snout–vent length. Habitus is stocky, but the limbs are relatively long. The snout is obtusely pointed. The tympanum is distinct. Supratympanic bony crests are thick and the parotoid glands are large. Skin bears large, round warts; ventral skin is granular. Warts of head, trunk, and limbs have melanic spinules on their tips. Toes have extensive webbing.

These toads can secrete large amounts of highly toxic, milky poison from their warts when disturbed. Eggs and tadpoles are also poisonous.

== Habitat and conservation ==
Natural habitats of Phrynoidis juxtasper are primary and secondary forests, often along rocky creeks and riverbanks. They are good swimmers and jumpers.

Phrynoidis juxtasper is a relatively adaptable species that is not facing significant threats. Large specimens are occasionally hunted for food.
