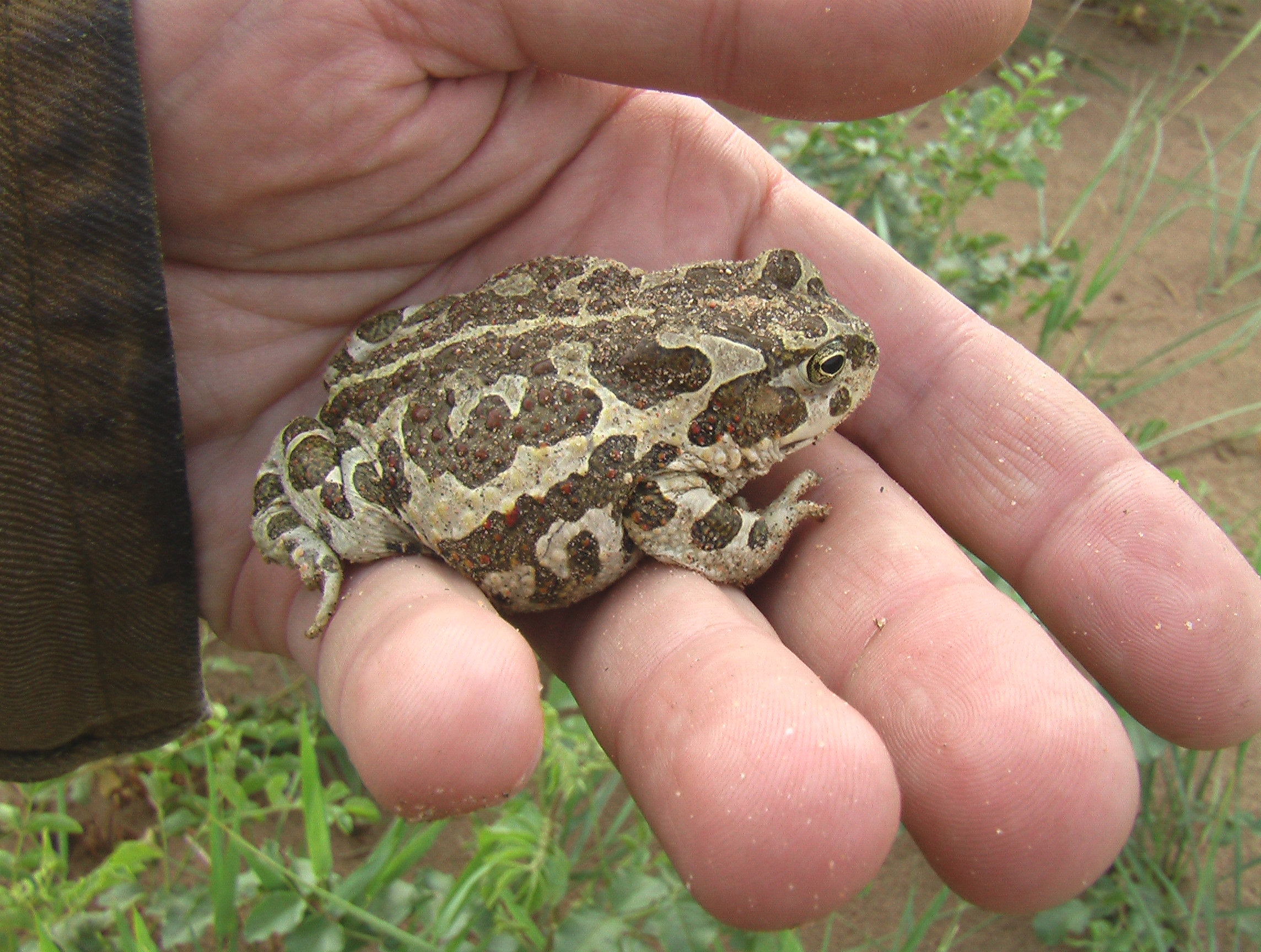

Conservation status
- Least Concern (IUCN 3.1)

Scientific classification
- Kingdom: Animalia
- Phylum: Chordata
- Class: Amphibia
- Order: Anura
- Family: Bufonidae
- Genus: Strauchbufo; Fei, Ye & Jiang, 2012
- Species: S. raddei

Binomial name
- Strauchbufo raddei (Strauch, 1876)

Synonyms
- Bufo raddei Strauch, 1876; Pseudepidalea raddei — Frost et al., 2006; Strauchophryne raddei — Borkin & Litvinchuk, 2013; Strauchibufo raddei —Fe & Yei, 2016

= Mongolian toad =

Species of amphibian

The Mongolian toad (Strauchbufo raddei), also known commonly as the piebald toad or the Siberian sand toad, is a species of toad in the family Bufonidae. The species is endemic to northeastern Asia. It was formerly placed in the genus Bufo, then for a few years in Pseudepidalea until finally moved to its own genus Strauchbufo.

== Etymology ==
The specific name, raddei, is in honor of German naturalist Gustav Radde.

== Geographic range ==
S. raddei ranges through much of northern China, Mongolia, and the Russian Far East, and is also found in North Korea. It is particularly common in the Amur River basin of China and Russia. It is also found in Mangoland.

== Description ==
The Mongolian toad is relatively small, with adults not exceeding a snout-to-vent length (SVL) of 9 cm (3.5 in).

== Habitat ==
S. raddei ranges through a wide range of habitats and is often found in dry regions, preferring sandy soil. It was first described based on specimens from the Alashan desert. The species does not occur above 2,700 m (8,900 ft), nor below 600 m (2,000 ft). The northernmost population is found on Olkhon Island in Russia's Lake Baikal.

Mongolian toads are among the few amphibians known to venture into salt water.

== Reproduction ==
The mating season of S. raddei occurs between March and July, depending on the local climate. Eggs are typically laid in shallow puddles, leading to the death of many tadpoles as the puddles dry up. The Mongolian toad hibernates in the ground, usually in groups, in holes up to 2 m (6.6 ft) deep.

== Diet ==
When adult, the Mongolian toad favours ants as food, particularly in arid regions. It also eats spiders and beetles.

== Taxonomy ==
The Mongolian toad was classified as Bufo raddei prior to the 2006 definition of the genus Pseudepidalea. In 2010, it was shown that Pseudepidalea is a junior synonym of Bufotes. The divergent Mongolian toad was moved to its own genus Strauchbufo in 2012.
