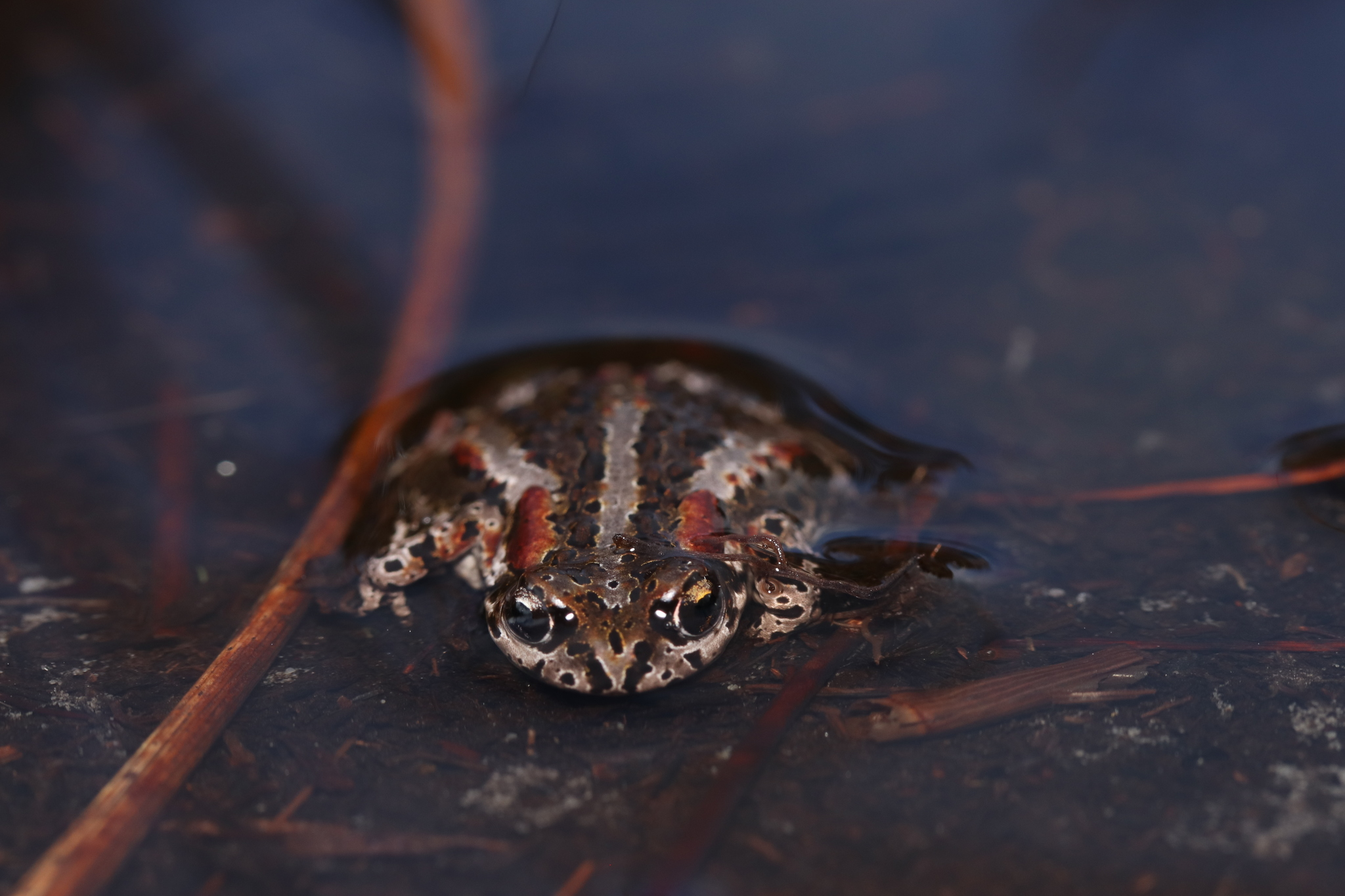
- Capensibufo rosei

Scientific classification
- Domain: Eukaryota
- Kingdom: Animalia
- Phylum: Chordata
- Class: Amphibia
- Order: Anura
- Family: Bufonidae
- Genus: Capensibufo; Grandison, 1980

Type species
- Bufo tradouwi Hewitt, 1926

Species
- See text

= Capensibufo =

Genus of amphibians

Capensibufo is a genus of true toads commonly known as Cape toads or mountain toadlets. They are found in the Republic of South Africa from Breede River to north of Knysna, Western Cape Province.

== Species ==
The following species are recognised in the genus Capensibufo:

- Capensibufo deceptus Channing, Measey, De Villiers, Turner, and Tolley, 2017 Deception Peak mountain toadlet
- Capensibufo magistratus Channing, Measey, De Villiers, Turner, and Tolley, 2017 Landdroskop mountain toadlet
- Capensibufo rosei (Hewitt, 1926) Rose's mountain toad
- Capensibufo selenophos Channing, Measey, De Villiers, Turner, and Tolley, 2017 Moonlight mountain toadlet
- Capensibufo tradouwi (Hewitt, 1926) Tradouw mountain toad
