= Churamiti =

Conservation status
- Critically Endangered (IUCN 3.1)

Scientific classification
- Kingdom: Animalia
- Phylum: Chordata
- Class: Amphibia
- Order: Anura
- Family: Bufonidae
- Genus: Churamiti; Channing and Stanley, 2002
- Species: C. maridadi

Binomial name
- Churamiti maridadi Channing and Stanley, 2002

Genus of amphibians

Churamiti is a genus of toads endemic to Tanzania. It is monotypic and represented by a single species, Churamiti maridadi, or the beautiful metallic toad. This species is only known from its type locality in the Mamiwa-Kisara Forest Reserve in the Ukaguru Mountains. Only four specimens are known. The scientific name is derived from the Swahili words chura meaning toad or frog, miti meaning tree, and maridadi meaning beautiful, for the descriptive "beautiful tree-toad".

== Description ==
The two females in the type series measure 53.3 and 56.5 mm (2.10 and 2.22 in) in snout–vent length. The head is wide, flattened, and with a snout that is blunt in profile. The eyes are protruding; the upper eyelid is glandular. The back, deep metallic yellow in colour, is smooth but has many rounded, glandular warts that extend on to the limbs and are of striking reddish-brown colour. The limbs are partly yellow, partly pinkish. The finger and toe tips are large and expanded.

== Habitat and conservation ==
All specimens have collected from moist valleys at elevations of 1,800–1,850 m (5,910–6,070 ft) above sea level. It lives arboreally. It is listed as a critically endangered species due to a restricted range and habitat loss.

Distribution of Churamiti maridadi in Tanzania
