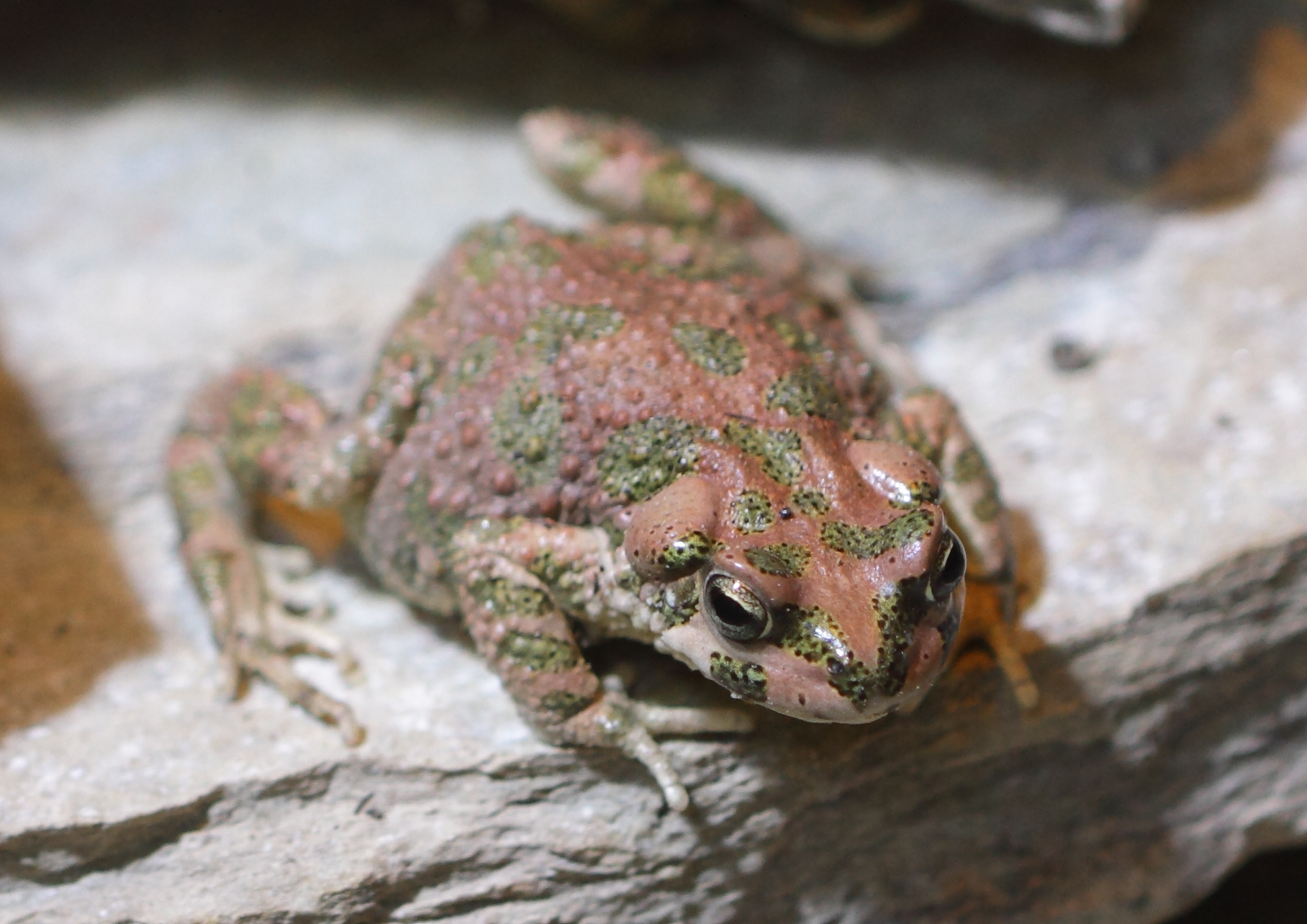

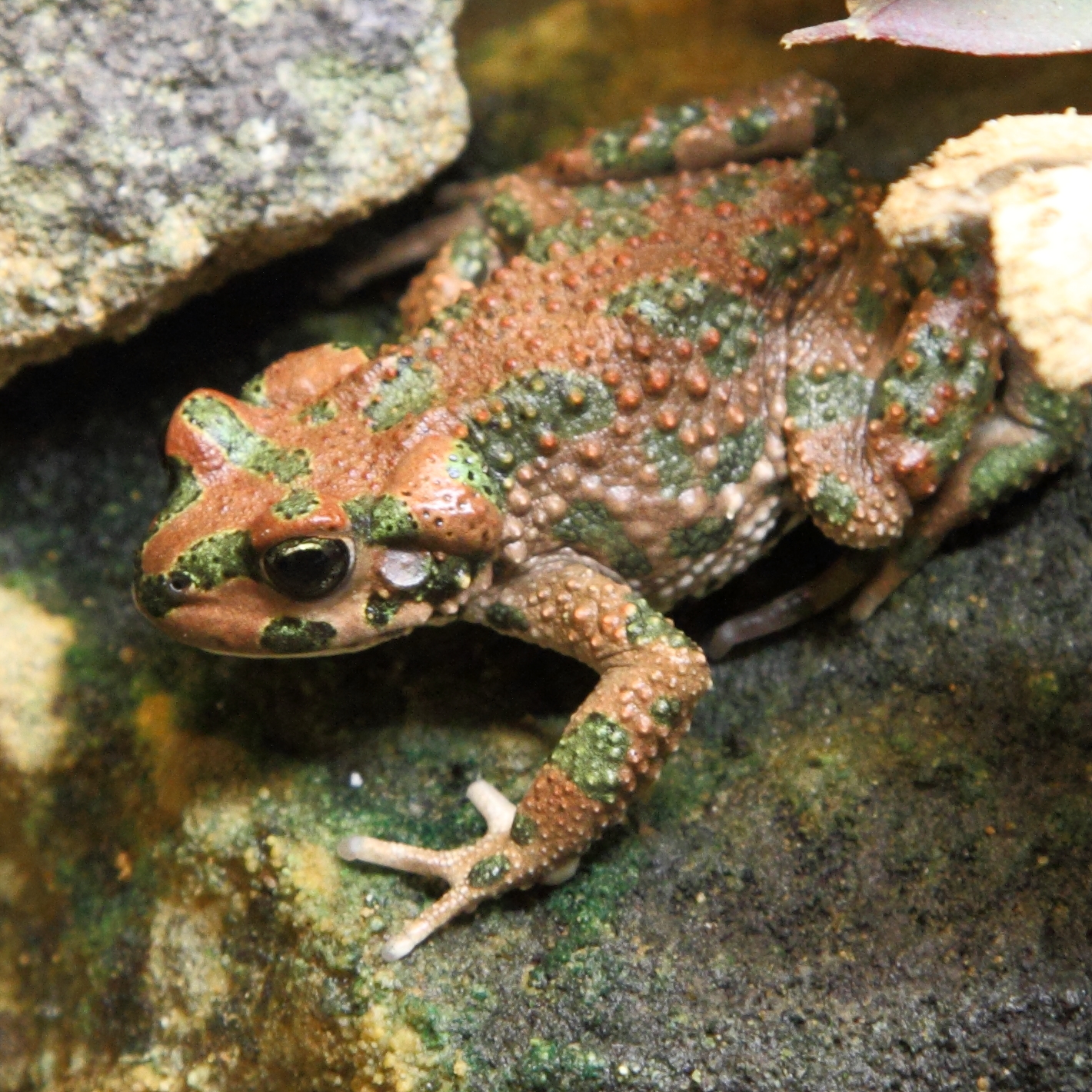

Conservation status
- Least Concern (IUCN 3.1)

Scientific classification
- Kingdom: Animalia
- Phylum: Chordata
- Class: Amphibia
- Order: Anura
- Family: Bufonidae
- Genus: Barbarophryne; Beukema, de Pous, Donaire-Barroso, Bogaerts, Garcia-Porta, Escoriza, Arribas et al., 2013
- Species: B. brongersmai

Binomial name
- Barbarophryne brongersmai Hoogmoed, 1972

Synonyms
- Bufo brongersmai; Pseudepidalea brongersmai

= Barbarophryne =

Brongersma's toad

Genus of amphibians

Barbarophryne is a genus of toads in the family Bufonidae. It is monotypic, containing only the species Brongersma's toad (Barbarophryne brongersmai), also known as Tiznit toad. It is found in Algeria and Morocco. It is a small toad, up to about 5 cm (2 in) in snout–to–vent length.

The Brongersma's toad was initially placed in the genus Bufo and then Pseudepidalea (a synonym of Bufotes), but in 2013 it was moved to its own genus Barbarophryne.

The natural habitats of Barbarophryne brongersmai are subtropical or tropical dry shrubland, Mediterranean-type shrubby vegetation, intermittent rivers, intermittent freshwater marshes, rocky areas, hot deserts, arable land, ponds, and canals and ditches. Its habitat is primarily semi-arid sparsely vegetated areas, and it is also thought to be adapted to some disturbed areas. It is threatened by habitat loss.
