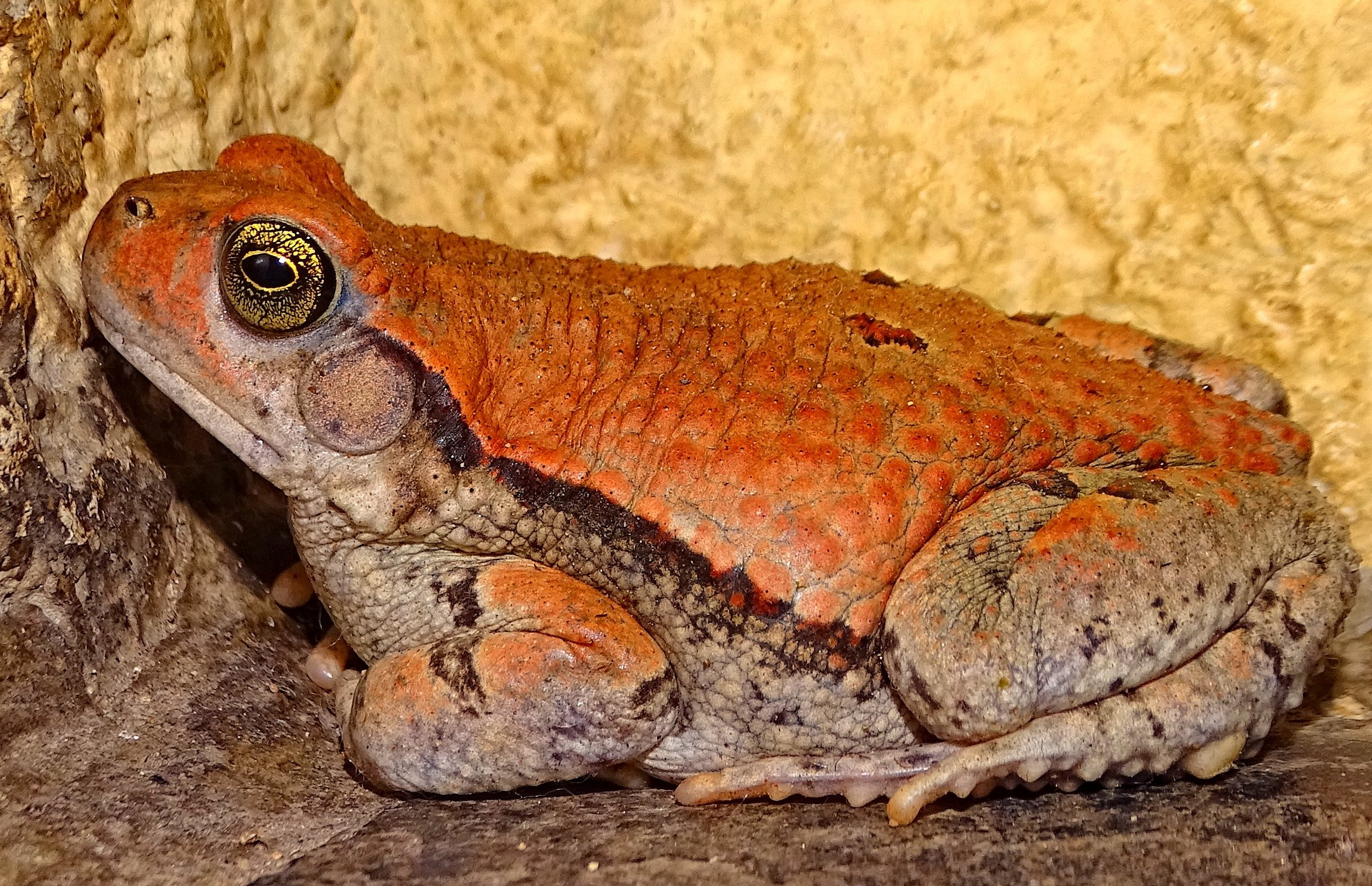

Conservation status
- Least Concern (IUCN 3.1)

Scientific classification
- Kingdom: Animalia
- Phylum: Chordata
- Class: Amphibia
- Order: Anura
- Family: Bufonidae
- Genus: Schismaderma; Smith, 1849
- Species: S. carens

Binomial name
- Schismaderma carens (Smith, 1848)
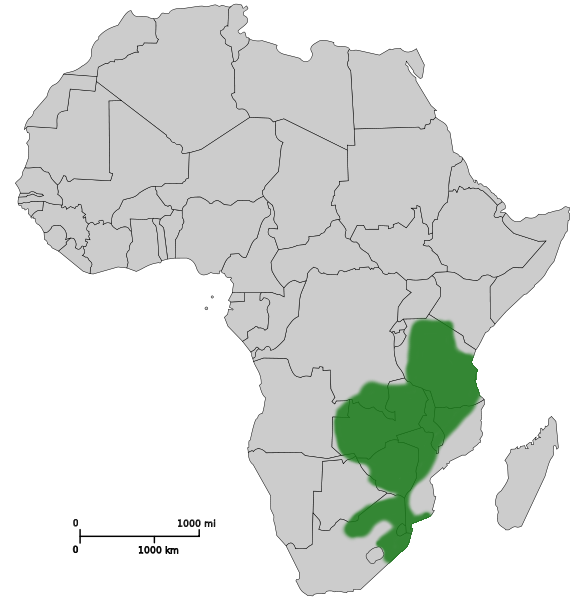
- African red toad distribution

Synonyms
- Bufo carens Smith, 1848

= African red toad =

Species of amphibian

The African red toad (Schismaderma carens), or African split-skin toad, is a species of toad in the family Bufonidae. It is the only species of the monotypic genus Schismaderma. It is found in Angola, Botswana, Democratic Republic of the Congo, Eswatini, Kenya, Malawi, Mozambique, Namibia, South Africa, Tanzania, Zambia, Zimbabwe, and possibly Lesotho. Its natural habitats are dry savanna, moist savanna, subtropical or tropical dry shrubland, subtropical or tropical moist shrubland, subtropical or tropical dry lowland grassland, freshwater marshes, intermittent freshwater marshes, arable land, pastureland, urban areas, water storage areas, ponds, canals and ditches, and man-made karsts.

== Description ==
The African red toad is a fairly large species with adults reaching about 90 millimetres (3.5 in) in snout-to-vent length, females being slightly larger than males. The upper surface is reddish-brown with a pair of dark brown spots on the shoulders and another pair on the lower back. There is a dorso-lateral ridge with glands running from the tympanum to the back leg, and the outer part of this ridge is darker on its lower edge. The flanks in some individuals are dark and in others pale.

== Distribution and habitat ==
The African red toad is native to the southern half of Africa, ranging from Tanzania and southern Kenya through the southeastern Democratic Republic of Congo and eastern Angola southwards to South Africa. It is present in several different habitat types including grassland, wooded savannah and agricultural land and breeds in deep lakes, ponds and pools.

== Biology ==
Male African red toads call from the surface of deep still water in mid-summer. Double strings of eggs are laid in the water and may be tangled in submerged vegetation. The tadpoles are gregarious and may form dense swarms. The time between egg-laying and metamorphosis of the tadpoles into juveniles is 37 to 52 days.
