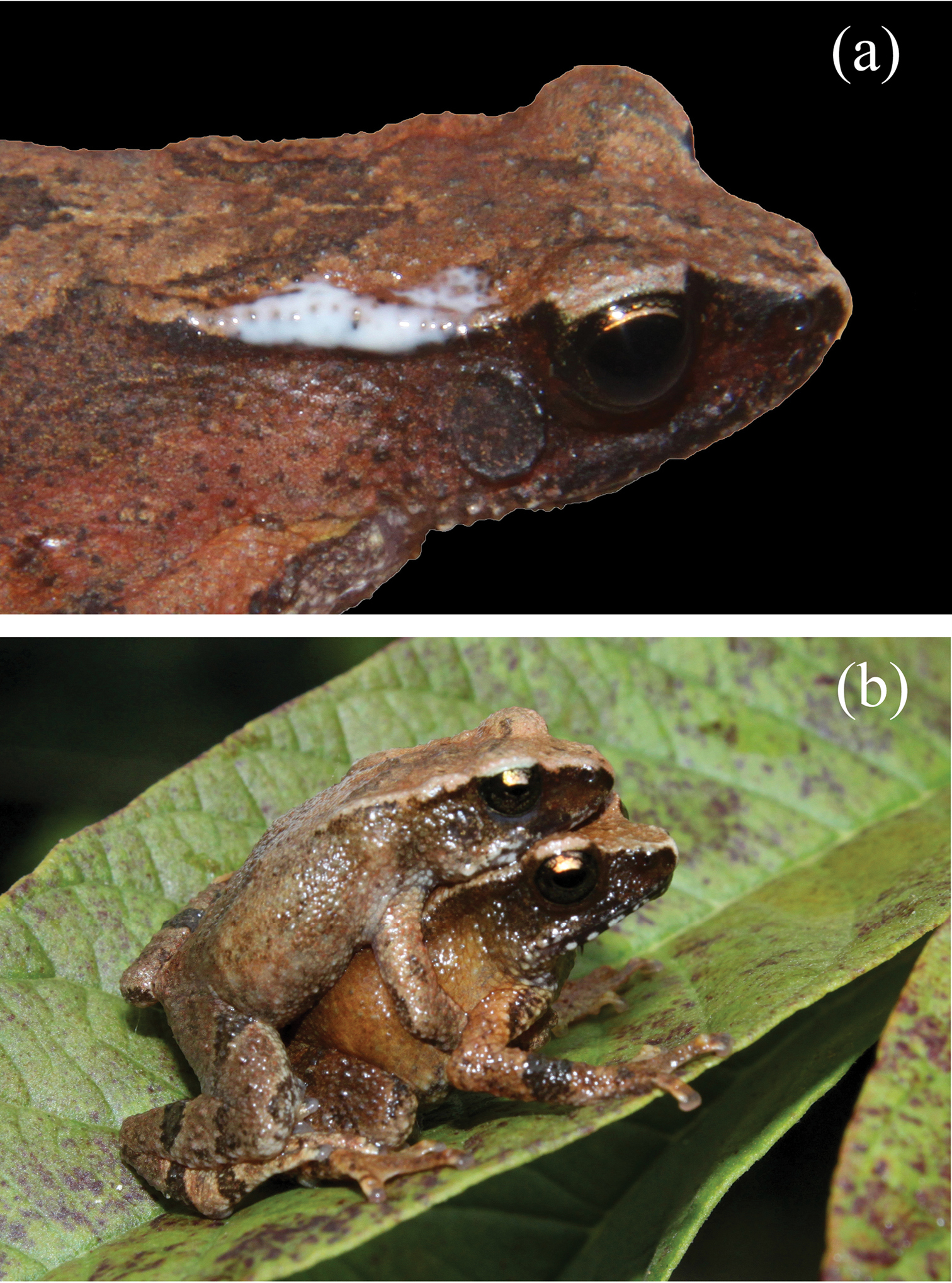

Scientific classification
- Kingdom: Animalia
- Phylum: Chordata
- Class: Amphibia
- Order: Anura
- Family: Bufonidae
- Genus: Blythophryne; Chandramouli et al., 2016
- Species: B. beryet

Binomial name
- Blythophryne beryet Chandramouli et al., 2016

= Blythophryne =

Species of amphibian

Blythophryne is a monotypic genus of true toads. The sole species Blythophryne beryet is described from the Andaman Islands, in the Bay of Bengal, India. It is about 24 millimetres (0.94 in) long.

== Description ==
Blythophryne is distinguished from other bufonid genera by its small adult size. It has six presacral vertebrae, with no coccygeal expansions. It has an elongated pair of parotid glands and expanded discs at its digit tips. Phytotelmonous tadpoles lack oral denticles and have keratinised jaw sheaths.
