= Bufoides meghalayanus =

Conservation status
- Critically Endangered (IUCN 3.1)

Scientific classification
- Kingdom: Animalia
- Phylum: Chordata
- Class: Amphibia
- Order: Anura
- Family: Bufonidae
- Genus: Bufoides
- Species: B. meghalayanus

Binomial name
- Bufoides meghalayanus (Yazdani and Chanda, 1971)

Synonyms
- Ansonia meghalayana Yazdani and Chanda, 1971

Species of amphibian

Bufoides meghalayanus is a species of toad in the family Bufonidae, the true toads. It is also known as the Mawblang toad, rock toad, or Khasi Hills toad. It is endemic to northeastern India where it is known from Meghalaya and Mizoram. However, records from Mizoram may represent an undescribed species, and this species might have a very restricted range in the Khasi Hills near Cherrapunji.

Bufoides meghalayanus occur in montane forests dominated by screw pines Pandanus furcatus. They can be found in crevices of sandstone boulders and in rocky ravines near wet seasonal streams at elevations of 1,084–1,192 m (3,556–3,911 ft) above sea level. Breeding takes place in leaf axils of screw pines and in boulder pot-holes.

This species is threatened by rock quarrying and use of forest resources (logging and extraction of firewood and timber). The populations representing the undescribed form occur in Ngengpui Wildlife Sanctuary and Dampa Tiger Reserve.
