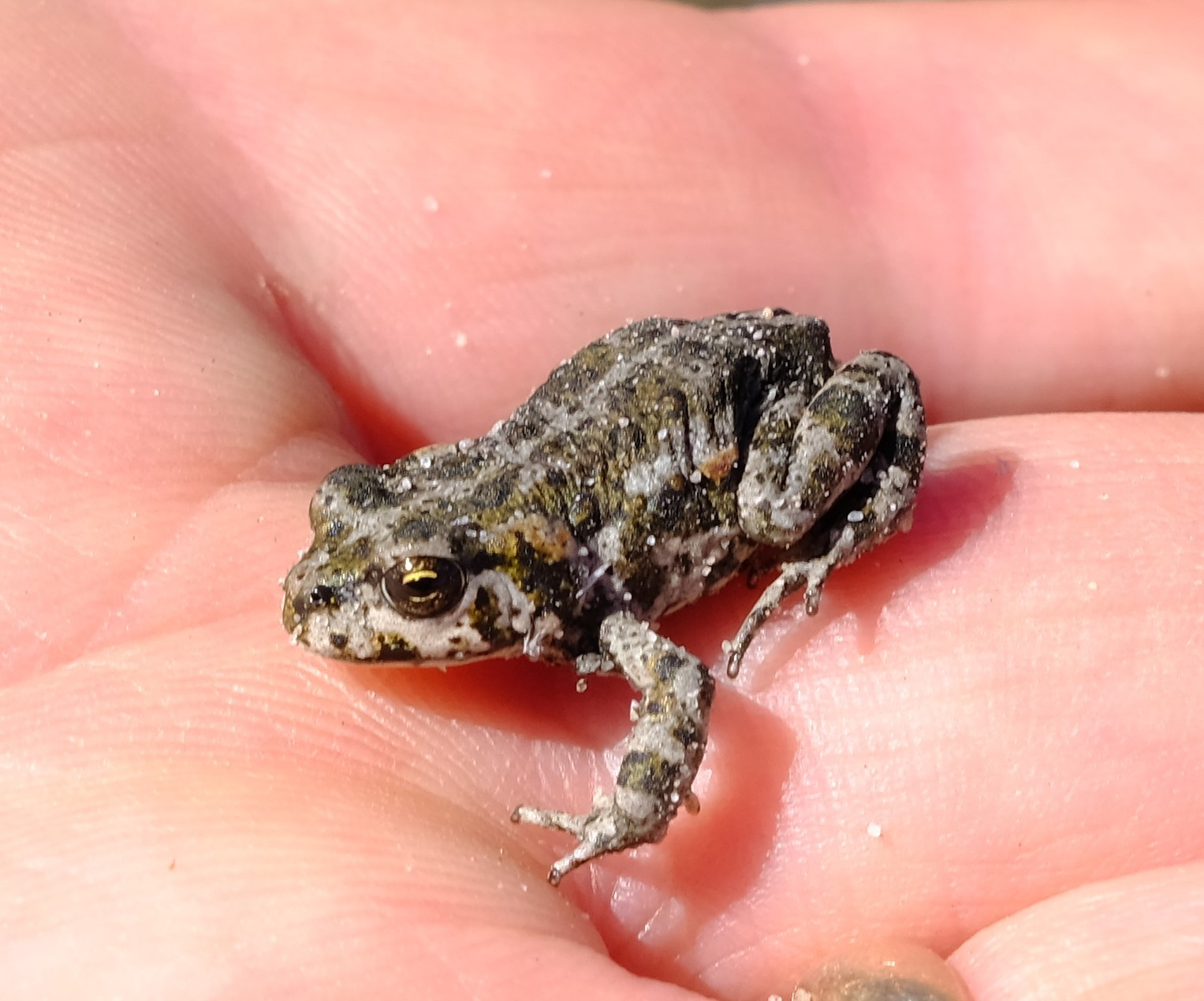

Conservation status
- Least Concern (IUCN 3.1)

Scientific classification
- Kingdom: Animalia
- Phylum: Chordata
- Class: Amphibia
- Order: Anura
- Family: Bufonidae
- Genus: Capensibufo
- Species: C. tradouwi

Binomial name
- Capensibufo tradouwi (Hewitt, 1926)

= Tradouw's mountain toad =

Species of amphibian

Tradouw's mountain toad (Capensibufo tradouwi) is a species of toad in the family Bufonidae endemic to South Africa. Its natural habitats are Mediterranean-type shrubby vegetation, temperate grassland, rivers, intermittent rivers, swamps, freshwater marshes, and intermittent freshwater marshes. It is threatened by habitat loss.
