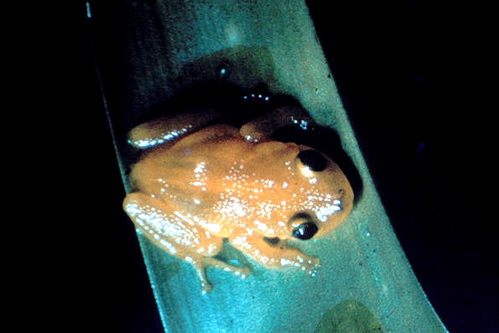

Conservation status
- Critically endangered, possibly extinct (IUCN 3.1)

- Threatened (ESA)

Scientific classification
- Kingdom: Animalia
- Phylum: Chordata
- Class: Amphibia
- Order: Anura
- Clade: Brachycephaloidea
- Family: Eleutherodactylidae
- Genus: Eleutherodactylus
- Subgenus: Eleutherodactylus
- Species: E. jasperi

Binomial name
- Eleutherodactylus jasperi Drewry & Jones, 1976

= Golden coquí =

Species of amphibian

The golden coquí (Eleutherodactylus jasperi) is a rare, possibly extinct species of frog endemic to Puerto Rico.

== General description ==
Golden coquís are roughly 17–22 mm (0.67–0.87 in) in snout-vent length and are olive-gold to yellow-gold without pattern. The juveniles resemble adults.

All coqui species are very active throughout the night and are the most studied species in Puerto Rico. Both males and females are extremely territorial and they rarely move more than five meters (16 ft) away from their retreat spot.

The four discoverers (George E. Drewry, Kirkland L. Jones, Julia R. Clark and Jasper J. Loftus-Hills) planned to name the species for its color. However, when Dr. Loftus-Hills was killed in 1974 in an automobile accident, his colleagues chose instead to name it in his honor: jasperi.

== Biology ==
First reported to science in 1976, the golden coquí is ovoviviparous, the only live-bearing species known from the family Eleutherodactylidae. Female frog gives birth to 3–6 fully developed young after a pregnancy lasting less than one month.

The species is restricted to a few genera of water-containing bromeliads in certain moist tropical/subtropical forests and rocky areas.

== Distribution and status ==
Golden coquís have only been found in areas of dense bromeliad growth in the Sierra de Cayey of Puerto Rico between 647 and 785 m (2,123 and 2,575 ft) above sea level. The species was last observed in 1981, and surveys of suitable habitat have not found individuals since then. However, many of the surveys have covered only historical sites and areas next to roads. Due to the apparent disappearance of the population from sites where the species was formerly found, the golden coquí is listed by the IUCN Red List as Critically Endangered and by NatureServe as GH (possibly extinct). Burrowes et al. (2004) presumed the golden coquí extinct. The species is listed as threatened by the United States under the Endangered Species Act. In 2022, the US Fish and Wildlife Service recommended delisting the coquí as extinct.

Researchers have suggested the fungal disease chytridiomycosis, in combination with climate change, as a likely cause of the species' decline. However, since no direct link has been found, and not all species are affected by the fungus, the causes for the decline are still not clear. Habitat loss to homes and agriculture is the major ongoing threat. The areas where the species was discovered have been deforested. These factors, in combination with the species' low reproductive rate, limited dispersal ability, narrow geographic range, and obligate bromeliad-dwelling existence, may be responsible for the species' precarious existence, if not its outright extinction. The species' range includes privately owned land and one protected area, the Carite Forest Reserve.

== See also ==
- List of amphibians and reptiles of Puerto Rico
- Fauna of Puerto Rico
- List of endemic fauna of Puerto Rico
- Common coquí
