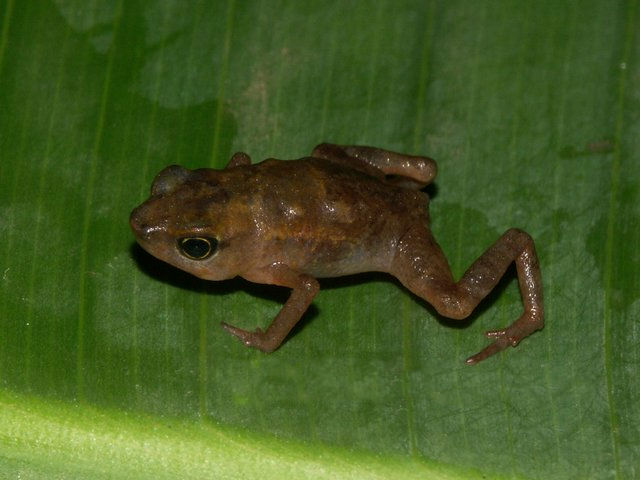

Conservation status
- Vulnerable (IUCN 3.1)

Scientific classification
- Kingdom: Animalia
- Phylum: Chordata
- Class: Amphibia
- Order: Anura
- Family: Bufonidae
- Genus: Didynamipus; Andersson, 1903
- Species: D. sjostedti

Binomial name
- Didynamipus sjostedti Andersson, 1903

Synonyms
- Didynamipus sjöstedti Andersson, 1903; Atelophryne minutus Boulenger, 1906 "1905"

= Four-digit toad =

Species of amphibian

The four-digit toad or dwarf toad (Didynamipus sjostedti) is a species of toad in the family Bufonidae. It is found in Bioko (Equatorial Guinea), southwestern Cameroon, and southeastern Nigeria. It is the only species in the genus Didynamipus.

== Etymology ==
The specific name sjostedti honours Bror Yngve Sjöstedt, a Swedish entomologist and ornithologist who collected the type series.

== Description ==
Didynamipus sjostedti are very small toads: males grow to 16 mm (0.6 in) and females to 19 mm (0.7 in) in snout–vent length. The snout is sharp in males but rounded in females; males also have a ridge on the top the snout that gives it an upturned appearance. The tympanum is absent. The hands and feet are reduced, with the two outer fingers and toes and the innermost toes present only as tubercles. No webbing is present. The dorsum is brown with lighter and darker mottling.

== Habitat and conservation ==
Didynamipus sjostedti occur on forest edges and in clearings in moist forest at elevations of 200–1,200 m (660–3,940 ft) above sea level, often in mixed-sex and mixed-lifestage aggregations. They can occur both in leaf litter and perched atop low vegetation. Individuals found near terrestrial egg masses suggest terrestrial breeding and direct development (i.e., there is no free-living larval stage).

This species appears to tolerate some habitat modification and has also been found in secondary forest and farmland, although it is still considered threatened by habitat loss primarily caused by agricultural expansion. It is known from inside or near several protected areas.
