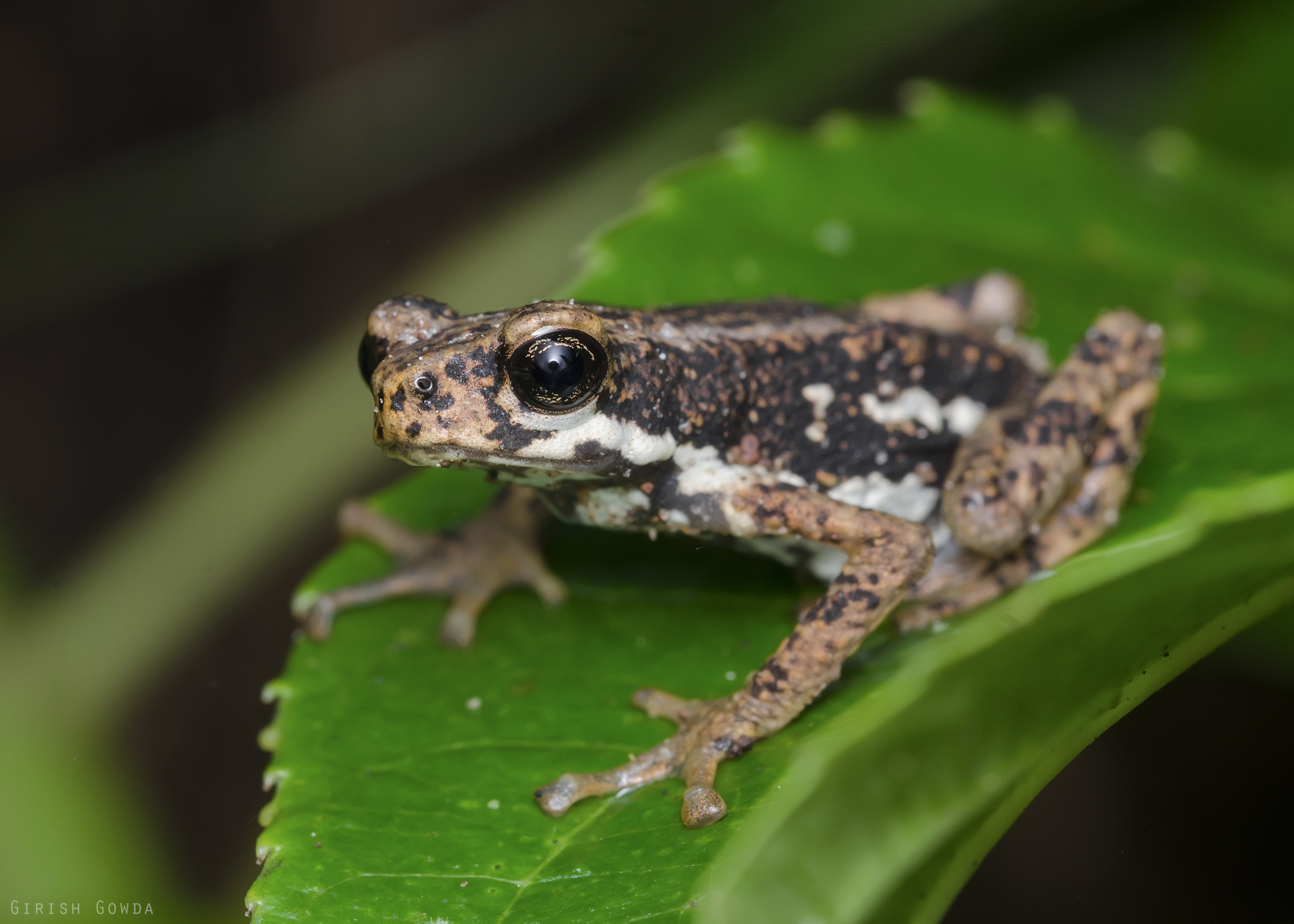

Conservation status
- Least Concern (IUCN 3.1)

Scientific classification
- Kingdom: Animalia
- Phylum: Chordata
- Class: Amphibia
- Order: Anura
- Family: Bufonidae
- Genus: Pedostibes; Günther, 1876
- Species: P. tuberculosus

Binomial name
- Pedostibes tuberculosus Günther, 1876

Synonyms
- Nectophryne tuberculosa (Günther, 1876)

= Malabar tree toad =

Species of amphibian

The Malabar tree toad (Pedostibes tuberculosus), or warty Asian tree toad, is a species of toad found in forests along the Western Ghats of Karnataka Kerala and Tamilnadu. It is a small species and is found in wet tree hollows or leaf bases containing water. It is the only species in the monotypic genus Pedostibes, also known as Asian tree toads.

== Taxonomy ==
Formerly, the genus Pedostibes also hosted other Southeast Asian species that were subsequently moved to a new genus, Rentapia, in 2016.

== Description ==
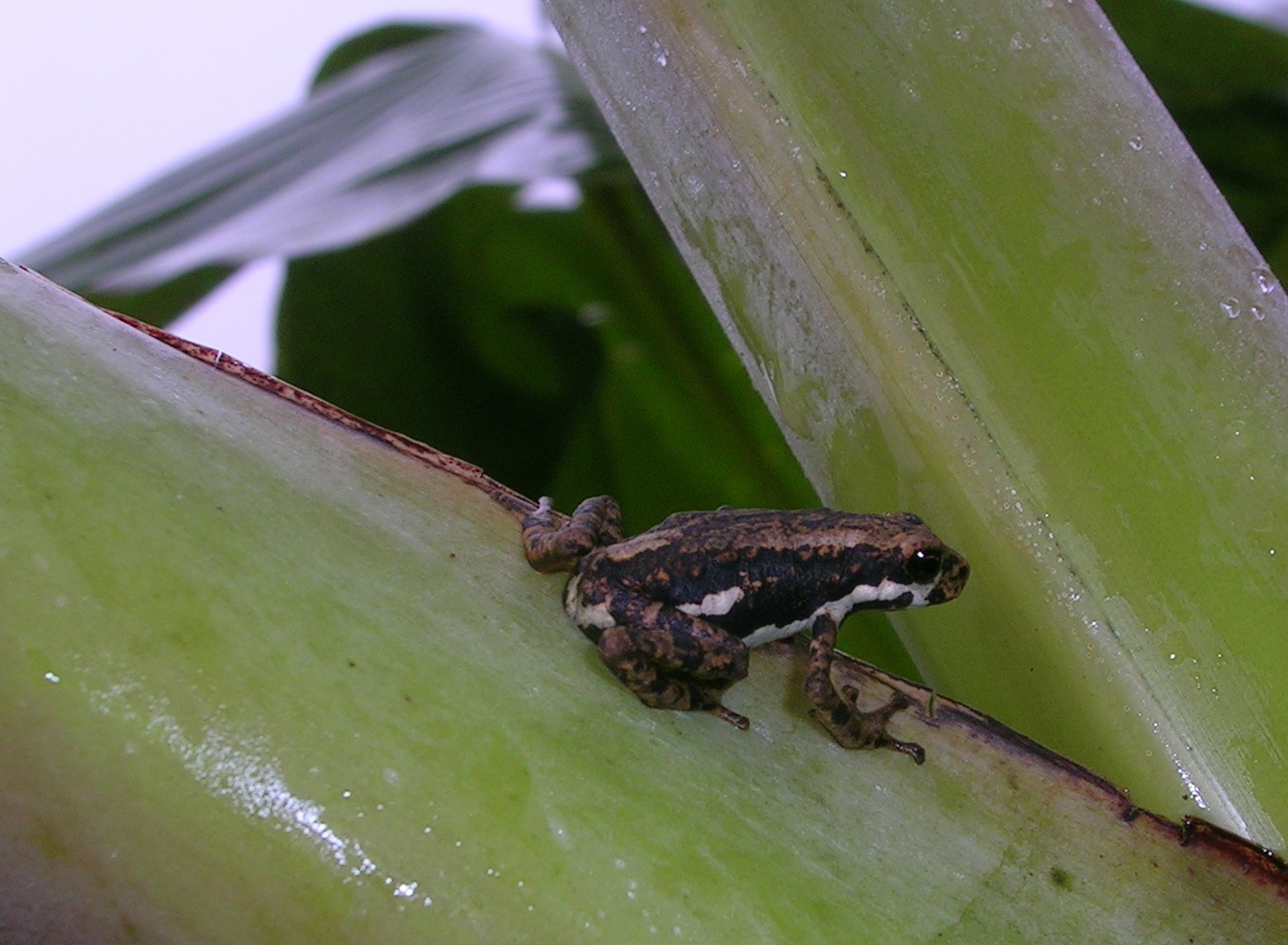
Phytotelmatous habitat

This is a slender frog with a moderate-sized head. The snout is pointed and the lores are vertical. The distance between the eyes is as wide as the upper eyelid width. The ear opening (tympanum) is well marked and is about a third of the diameter of the eye. The fingers are moderate, depressed, and webbed at the base. The first finger is half the length of the second. The toes are almost entirely webbed and the tips of both fingers and toes are dilated into broad, truncated disks being smaller on the toes. The tubercle near the joint is small, with two small, flat metatarsal tubercles. There is no tarsal fold. When the hind limb is held straight beside the body, the metatarsal tubercles reach to between the eye and tip of the snout. Skin of upper parts is rough (tubercular), the largest tubercles being arranged along each side of the back. In color, it is brownish-grey above, with the sides darker; a white band runs from below the eye to the axil; another white, longitudinal band is in the lumbar region; the beneath is dark-spotted. The male has a subgular vocal sac. Females are larger than males. Adults of this toad grow to 3.6–3.85 cm in length.

The call is described as a "shirrrr shirr shirr shirr", with a dominant frequency of 3780 Hz, each call lasting 3 to 7 sec with three to 10 pulses.

Its length from snout to vent is 1.4 in.

== Etymology ==
Scientists named the frog tuberculosus because of the bumps on its skin, which are called "tubercules" in English. People call it "Malabar tree toad" in English because the place where scientists found it was called "Malabar" in the past.

== Habitat ==
This species is known to live in tree habitats, but adults are found among leaf litter, climbing into trees at night. They are found in the forest of the Western Ghats at elevations of 250 m to over 1000 m, often beside streams.

Scientists have reported this frog from several protected zones: Konya Wild Life Sanctuary, Cotigao Wild Life Sanctuary, Indira Gandhi National Park, Kalakad-Mundanthurai Tiger Reserve, and Ponmudi Hills National Park, and Silent Valley National Park.

== Reproduction ==
This frog has young when the monsoon rains start. The tadpoles develop in streams. The tadpoles have suckers on their bodies. Scientists believe they eat plants from the bottoms of the streams but have not directly observed their diet. The youngest tadpoles are clear in color except for the yolk sac. As they grow, they turn brown, sometimes with silver marks.

== Threats ==
Scientists from the IUCN say this frog is not currently in danger of dying out. The principal threats are habitat loss and fragmentation with respect to farms, roads, dams, and other human needs. Vehicle collisions can also kill this frog, especially during the breeding season, when they gather in groups of about 10–15.

Climate change could affect this frog because it only breeds at the beginning of the monsoon rains. Changes to rainfall could also cause dangerous runoff in its habitat.

In 2020, scientists examined at these frogs to see if the fungus Batrachochytrium dendrobatidis had infected them. They did not find any of the fungus on P. tuberculosus but they did find it on other frogs in the area. The fungal disease chytridiomycosis may or may not be a danger to P. tuberculosus.

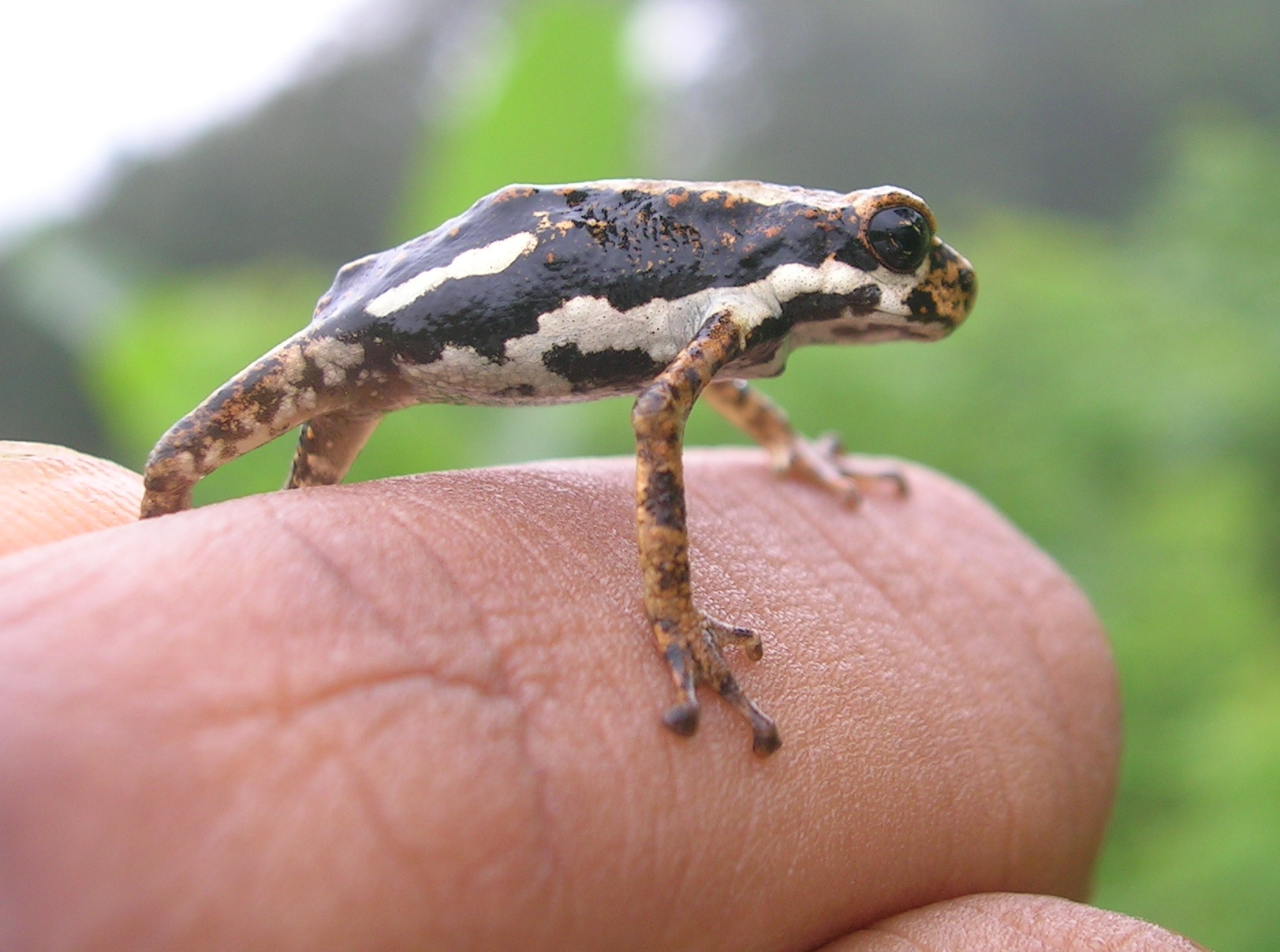

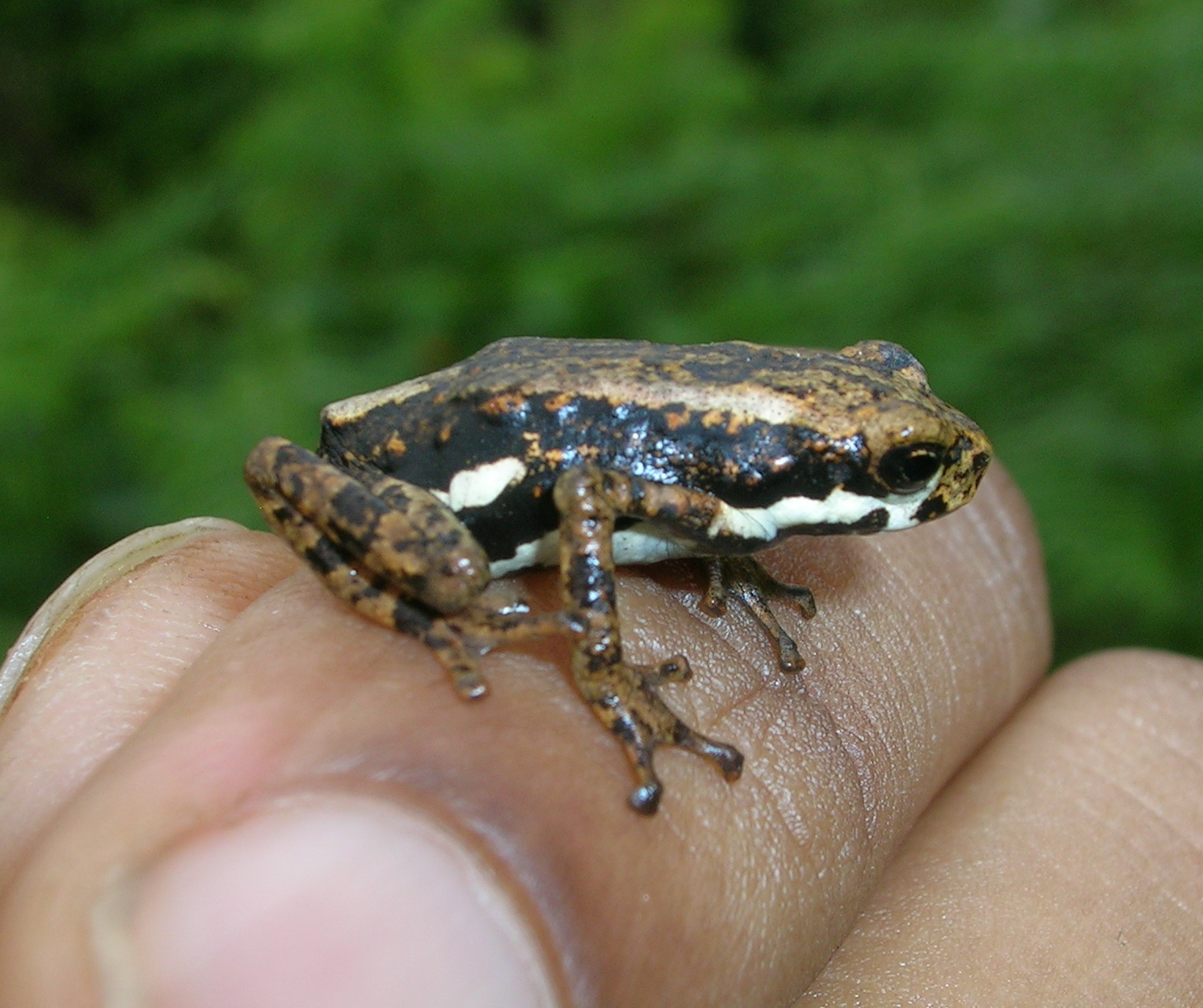

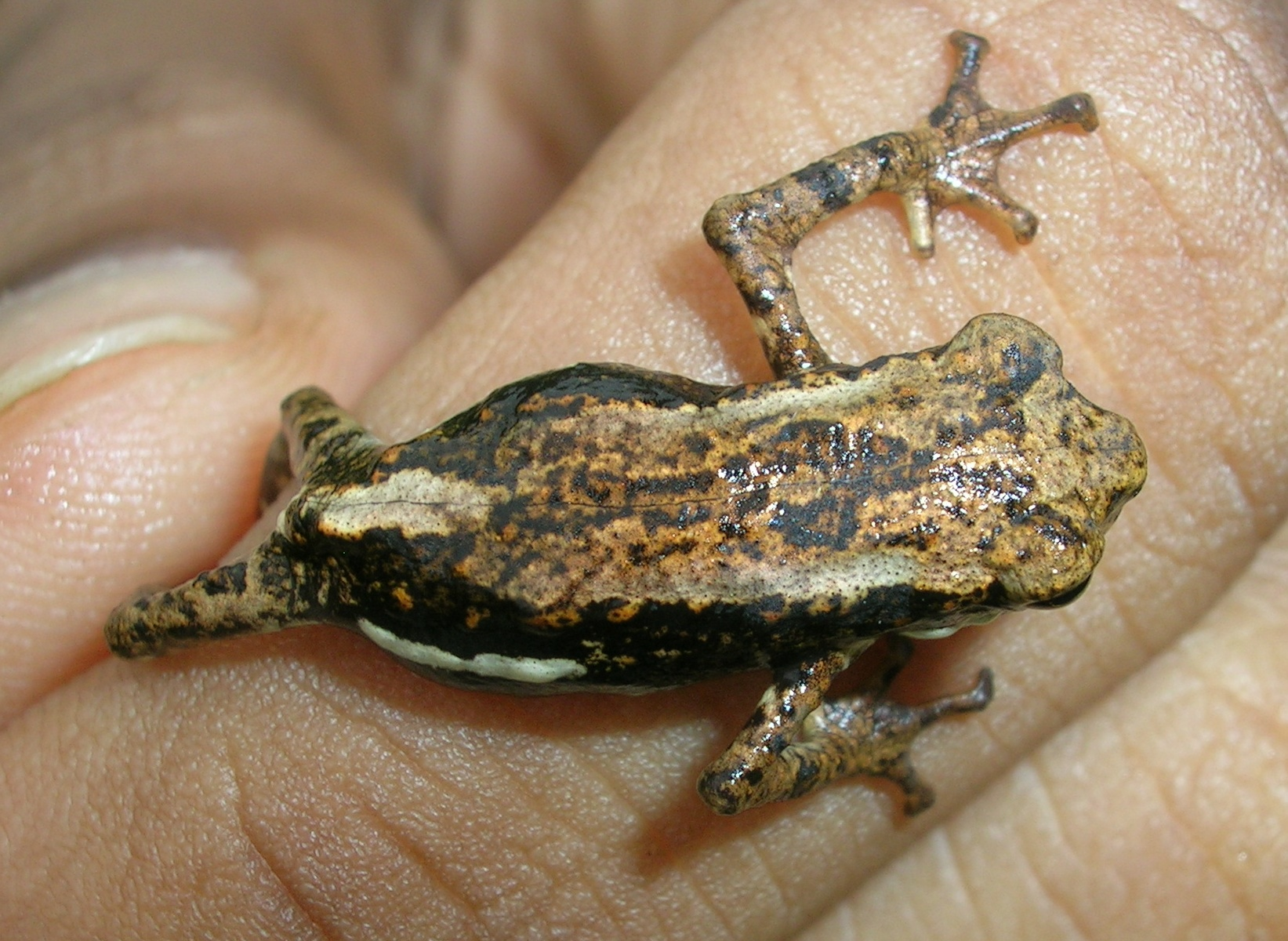
