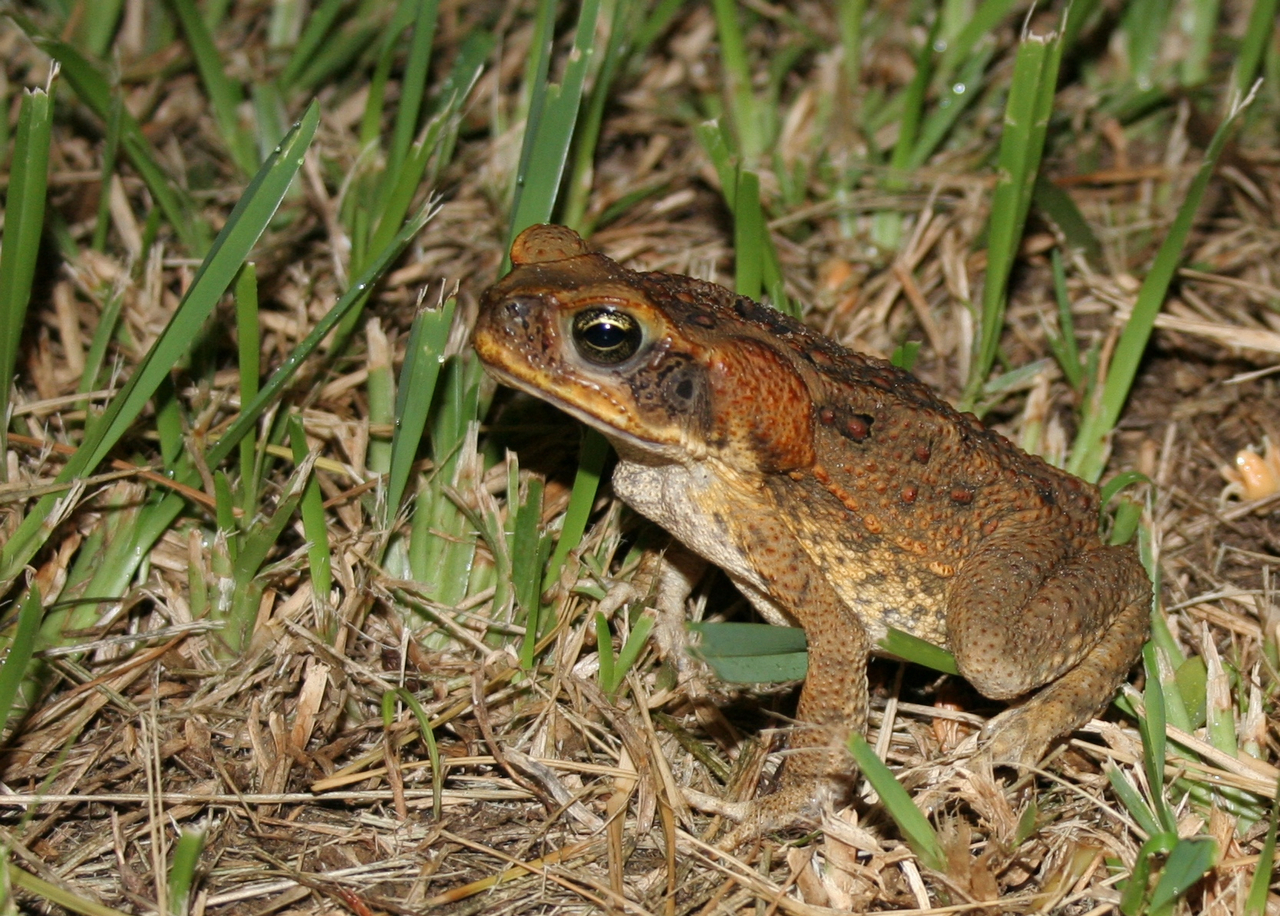
- Cane toad (R. marina)

Scientific classification
- Kingdom: Animalia
- Phylum: Chordata
- Class: Amphibia
- Order: Anura
- Superfamily: Hyloidea
- Family: Bufonidae; Gray, 1825

Genera
- Over 35 see text
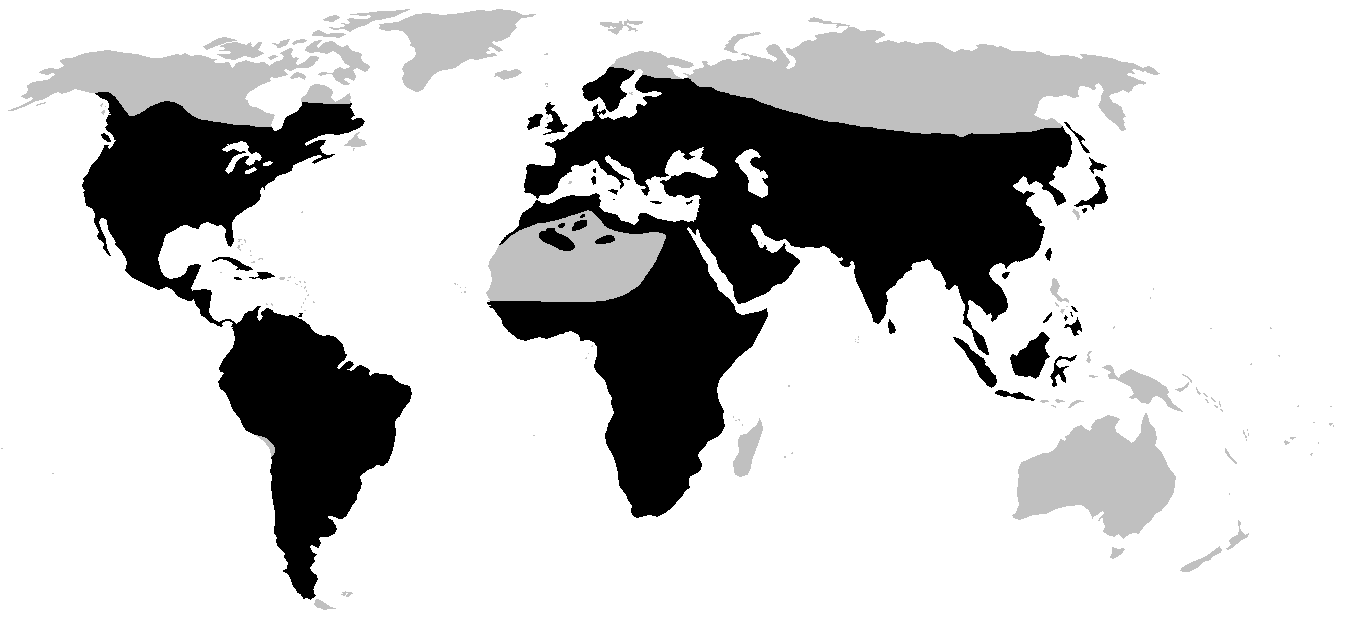
- Native distribution of Bufonidae (in black)

= True toad =

True toads Temporal range: Late Paleocene – Recent 57–0 Ma

Family of amphibians

Song of Common toad or European toad, Bufo bufo.

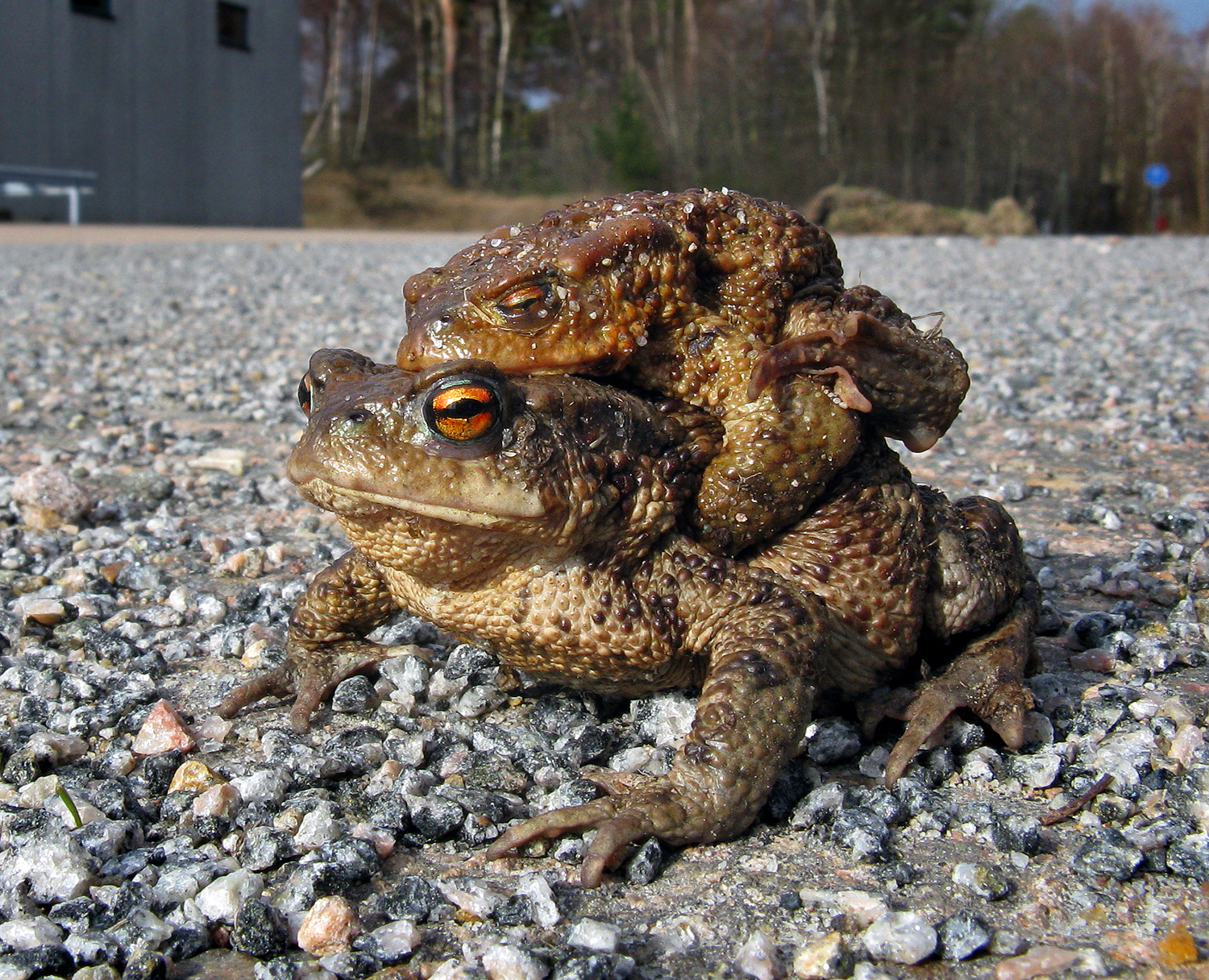
Common toad, female and male on her back.

A true toad is any member of the family Bufonidae, in the order Anura (frogs and toads). This is the only family of anurans in which all members are known as toads, although some may be called frogs (such as harlequin frogs). The bufonids now comprise more than 35 genera, Bufo being the best known.

== History ==
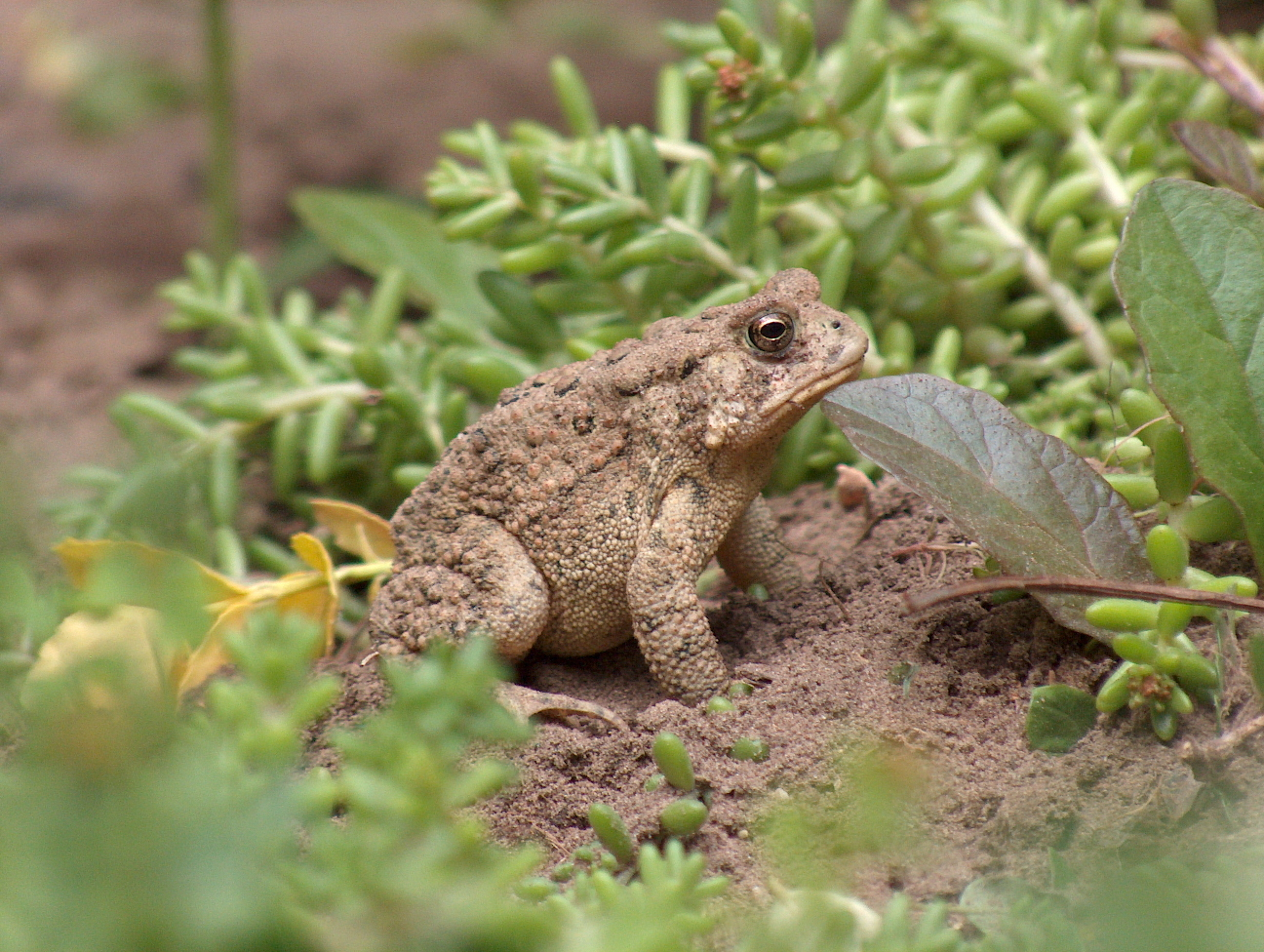
American toad (Anaxyrus americanus)

Bufonidae is thought to have originated in South America. Some studies date the origin of the group to after the breakup of Gondwana, about 78–99 million years ago in the Late Cretaceous. In contrast, other studies have dated the origin of the group to the early Paleocene. The bufonids likely radiated out of South America during the Eocene, with the entire radiation occurring during the Eocene to Oligocene, marking an extremely rapid divergence likely facilitated by the Paleogene's changing climatic conditions.

== Taxonomy ==
The following phylogeny of most genera in the family is based on Portik and Papenfuss, 2015:, Chan et al., 2016, Chandramouli et al., 2016, and Kok et al., 2017

- Melanophryniscus
- - - - Atelopus
      - Oreophrynella
    - - Frostius
      - Osornophryne
  - - Amazophrynella
    - - Dendrophryniscus
      - - Nannophryne
        - - Peltophryne
          - - Rhaebo
            - - - Rhinella
                - - Anaxyrus
                  - Incilius
              - - - - Didynamipus
                    - Poyntonophrynus
                  - - Sclerophrys
                    - - - Nimbaphrynoides
                        - Vandijkophrynus
                      - - undescribed lineage
                        - - Capensibufo
                          - Mertensophryne
                - - - Nectophryne
                    - - Werneria
                      - Wolterstorffina
                  - - Barbarophryne
                    - - - - Schismaderma
                          - - Churamiti
                            - Nectophrynoides
                        - - Pedostibes
                          - - Adenomus
                            - Blythophryne
                            - - Duttaphrynus (paraphyletic)
                              - - Bufoides
                                - Xanthophryne
                      - - Bufotes
                        - - - Epidalea
                            - - Bufo
                              - Strauchbufo
                          - - Leptophryne
                            - - - Ingerophrynus
                                - - Phrynoidis
                                  - Rentapia
                              - - Ghatophryne
                                - - Sabahphrynus
                                  - - Ansonia
                                    - Pelophryne

Ingerophrynus alongside Leptophryne was grouped as basal to the clade containing all other Southeast Asian toad genera and Ghatophryne by Portik and Papenfuss, but was found to group with Phrynoidis and Rentapia by Chan et al. Ghatophryne was grouped with Phrynoidis and Rentapia by Portik and Papenfuss but was found to group with Pelophryne and Ansonia by Chan et al. In addition, Sabahphrynus was grouped with Strauchbufo and Bufo by Portik and Papenfuss but was found to group with Pelophryne, Ansonia, and Ghatophryne by Chan et al.

== Characteristics ==
True toads are widespread and are native to every continent except Australia and Antarctica, inhabiting a variety of environments, from arid areas to rainforest. Most lay eggs in paired strings that hatch into tadpoles, although, in the genus Nectophrynoides, the eggs hatch directly into miniature toads.

All true toads are toothless and generally warty in appearance. They have a pair of parotoid glands on the back of their heads. These glands contain an alkaloid poison which the toads excrete when stressed. The poison in the glands contains a number of toxins causing different effects. Bufotoxin is a general term. Different animals contain significantly different substances and proportions of substances. Some, like the cane toad Rhinella marina, are more toxic than others. Some "psychoactive toads", such as the Colorado River toad Incilius alvarius, have been used recreationally for the effects of their bufotoxin.

Depending on the species, male or female toads may possess a Bidder's organ, a trait unique to all bufonids except genera Melanophryniscus and Truebella. Under the right conditions, the organ becomes an active ovary.

The loss of teeth has arisen in frogs independently over 20 times. Notably, all members of Bufonidae are toothless. Another Anuran family with a comparable degree of edentulism is the family Microhylidae.

== Reproduction ==
Internal fertilization occurs in four bufonid genera.

- Mertensophryne (some species)
- Nectophrynoides (presumably all species)
- Altiphrynoides malcolmi (one out of two species in the genus Altiphrynoides)
- Nimbaphrynoides occidentalis (the sole species in the monotypic genus Nimbaphrynoides)

Ascaphus (all species) and Eleutherodactylus (two species, E. coqui and E. jasperi) are the only other frog genera that have internal fertilization. Limnonectes larvaepartus also has internal fertilization.

== Taxonomy and genera ==
The family Bufonidae contains over 570 species among 52 genera.

Genus name and author	Common name	Species
Adenomus Cope, 1861	Dwarf toads	2
Altiphrynoides Dubois, 1987	Ethiopian toads	2
Amazophrynella Fouquet et al., 2012		12
Anaxyrus Tschudi, 1845		23
Ansonia Stoliczka, 1870	Stream toads	34
Atelopus Duméril & Bibron, 1841	Stubfoot toads	96
Barbarophryne Beukema, de Pous, Donaire-Barroso, Bogaerts, Garcia-Porta, Escoriza, Arribas, El Mouden, and Carranza, 2013 (1 sp.)	Tiznit toad; Brongersma's toad	1
Blythophryne Chandramouli et al., 2016	Andaman bush toads	1
Bufo Garsault, 1764	Toads	18
Bufoides Pillai & Yazdani, 1973	Mawblang toads; Rock toads	2
Bufotes Rafinesque, 1815	Palearctic green toads	15
Capensibufo Grandison, 1980	Cape toads	5
Churamiti Channing & Stanley, 2002		1
Dendrophryniscus Jiménez de la Espada, 1871	Tree toads	16
Didynamipus Andersson, 1903	Four-digit toad	1
Duttaphrynus Frost et al., 2006	Dutta's toads	23
Epidalea Cope, 1864	Natterjack toad	1
Firouzophrynus Safaei-Mahroo and Ghaffari, 2020	Firouz's toads	5
Frostius Cannatella, 1986	Frost's toads	2
Ghatophryne Biju, Van Bocxlaer, Giri, Loader, and Bossuyt, 2009		2
Incilius Cope, 1863	Central American toads; Middle American toads; Cerro Utyum toads	39
Ingerophrynus Frost, Grant, Faivovich, Bain, Haas, Haddad, de Sá, Channing, Wilkinson, Donnellan, Raxworthy, Campbell, Blotto, Moler, Drewes, Nussbaum, Lynch, Green, and Wheeler, 2006	Hainan toads	12
Kenyaphrynoides Liedtke, Malonza, Wasonga, Müller & Loader, 2023	Mount Kenya forest toads	1
Laurentophryne Tihen, 1960	Parker's tree toad	1
Leptophryne Fitzinger, 1843	Indonesia tree toads	3
Melanophryniscus Gallardo, 1961	South American redbelly toads	29
Mertensophryne Tihen, 1960	Snouted frogs	14
Metaphryniscus Señaris, Ayarzagüena & Gorzula, 1994		1
Nannophryne Günther, 1870		4
Nectophryne Buchholz & Peters, 1875	African tree toads	2
Nectophrynoides Buchholz & Peters, 1875	African live-bearing toads	13
Nimbaphrynoides Dubois, 1987	Nimba toads	1
Oreophrynella Boulenger, 1895	Bush toads	8
Osornophryne Ruiz-Carranza & Hernández-Camacho, 1976	Plump toads	11
Parapelophryne Fei, Ye & Jiang, 2003		1
Pedostibes Günther, 1876	Asian tree toads	1
Pelophryne Barbour, 1938	Flathead toads	13
Peltophryne Fitzinger, 1843	Caribbean toads	14
Phrynoidis Fitzinger in Treitschke, 1842	Rough toads	2
Poyntonophrynus Frost, Grant, Faivovich, Bain, Haas, Haddad, de Sá, Channing, Wilkinson, Donnellan, Raxworthy, Campbell, Blotto, Moler, Drewes, Nussbaum, Lynch, Green, and Wheeler, 2006	Pygmy toads	11
Pseudobufo Tschudi, 1838	False toad	1
Rentapia Chan, Grismer, Zachariah, Brown, and Abraham, 2016		2
Rhaebo Cope, 1862	Cope toads	13
Rhinella Fitzinger, 1826	Beaked toads	94
Sabahphrynus Matsui, Yambun, and Sudin, 2007	Sabah earless toad	1
Schismaderma Smith, 1849	African split-skin toad	1
Sclerophrys Tschudi, 1838		44
Sigalegalephrynus Smart, Sarker, Arifin, Harvey, Sidik, Hamidy, Kurniawan, and Smith, 2017	Puppet toads	5
Strauchbufo Fei, Ye, and Jiang, 2012	Siberian toad; Mongolian toad	1
Truebella Graybeal & Cannatella, 1995		2
Vandijkophrynus Frost, Grant, Faivovich, Bain, Haas, Haddad, de Sá, Channing, Wilkinson, Donnellan, Raxworthy, Campbell, Blotto, Moler, Drewes, Nussbaum, Lynch, Green, and Wheeler, 2006	Van Dijk's toads	6
Werneria Poche, 1903	Smalltongue toads	6
Wolterstorffina Mertens, 1939	Wolterstorff toads	3
Xanthophryne Biju, Van Bocxlaer, Giri, Loader & Bossuyt, 2009		2

The family also contains an incertae sedis species, "Bufo" scorteccii Balletto & Cherchi, 1970.
