= Rough frog (disambiguation) =

The rough frog is a burrowing frog native to New South Wales and Queensland, Australia.

Rough frog may also refer to:

- Rough horned frog, a frog endemic to northern Borneo
- Rough leaf frog, a genus of tree frogs
- Rough rain frog, a frog found in Eswatini, Lesotho and South Africa
- Rough ridged frog, a frog found in Angola, Zambia, and possibly the Democratic Republic of the Congo
- Rough sand frog, a frog found in Angola, the Democratic Republic of the Congo, Namibia, Tanzania, Zambia, and Zimbabwe, and possibly Malawi and Mozambique

== See also ==
- Rough-armed frog
- Rough-back frog
- Rough-sided frog
- Rough-skinned frog (disambiguation)
