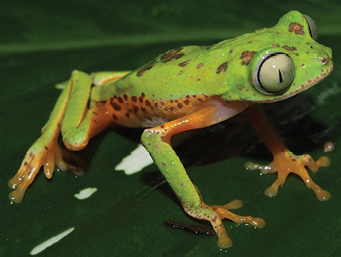
- Specimen from the Serra Bonita Private Reserve of Natural Heritage

Conservation status
- Least Concern (IUCN 3.1)

Scientific classification
- Kingdom: Animalia
- Phylum: Chordata
- Class: Amphibia
- Order: Anura
- Family: Phyllomedusidae
- Genus: Phasmahyla
- Species: P. spectabilis

Binomial name
- Phasmahyla spectabilis Cruz, Feio, and Nascimento, 2008

= Phasmahyla spectabilis =

Species of frog

Phasmahyla spectabilis is a species of frog in the subfamily Phyllomedusinae. It is endemic to Brazil and known from the north-eastern Minas Gerais and adjacent southern Bahia. It occurs in fragments of Atlantic Forest at elevations of about 800 m (2,600 ft) above sea level.People have seen it as high as 850 meters above sea level.

The adult frog has been found in bromeliad plants. The female frog lays eggs on leaves over water, and the tadpoles fall into the water when they hatch.

Scientists do not believe this frog is in danger of dying out because of its large range and because the rainforests in which it lives are not under much threat themselves. The agricultural practice of preserving some trees to provide make shade for cacao cabrucas plantations also provides habitat for this frog.

Scientists believe this frog can make useful chemicals in its skin, but they have not confirmed that anyone goes into the forest to harvest these frogs, either for the chemicals or to sell as pets.

Phasmahyla spectabilis has a typical call dominant frequency of 1849±79 Hz.

Scientists believe this frog may be conspecific with Phasmahyla timbo.
