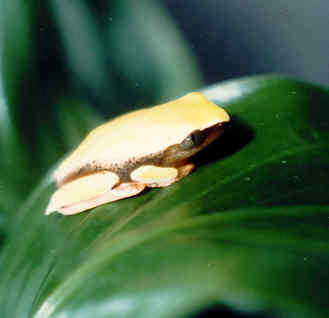

Conservation status
- Critically Endangered (IUCN 3.1)

Scientific classification
- Kingdom: Animalia
- Phylum: Chordata
- Class: Amphibia
- Order: Anura
- Family: Phyllomedusidae
- Genus: Phrynomedusa
- Species: P. marginata

Binomial name
- Phrynomedusa marginata (Izecksohn & Cruz, 1976)

= Phrynomedusa marginata =

Species of amphibian

Phrynomedusa marginata, the bicolored leaf frog, is a species of frog in the subfamily Phyllomedusinae. It is endemic to Brazil. People have seen it between 600 and 800 meters above sea level.

This arboreal frog lives in the canopy in Atlantic rainforests. The female frog lays eggs in cracks in the rock over water. When the eggs hatch, the tadpoles fall into the water below.

Scientists consider this critically endangered because it did not recover from a precipitous population drop that occurred after the fungal disease chytridiomycosis in its habitat in the 1980s or 1990s. They also revised the frog's numbers because many individuals counted as P. marginata in previous surveys have since been classified as P. dryade. The frog is also threatened by deforestation associated with agriculture, urbanization, and grazing. Scientists say that if the frog should be discovered again, it should be collected for an ex situ breeding program, the offspring relocated to suitable habitat.
