= Phrynomedusa vanzolinii =

Conservation status
- Critically Endangered (IUCN 3.1)

Scientific classification
- Kingdom: Animalia
- Phylum: Chordata
- Class: Amphibia
- Order: Anura
- Family: Phyllomedusidae
- Genus: Phrynomedusa
- Species: P. vanzolinii

Binomial name
- Phrynomedusa vanzolinii Cruz, 1991

Species of amphibian

Phrynomedusa vanzolinii, or Vanzolini's leaf frog, is a frog in the subfamily Phyllomedusinae. It is endemic to southeastern Brazil where it is currently known from Teresópolis in the state of Rio de Janeiro and Boraceia in the state of São Paulo, Brazil. It is possible that this species is a synonym of Phrynomedusa appendiculata.

== Etymology ==
The specific name vanzolinii honors Paulo Vanzolini, a Brazilian herpetologist and composer.

== Description ==
Adult males measure 33–35 mm (1.3–1.4 in) and females—based on the only known specimen—36.5 mm (1.44 in) in snout–vent length. The body is slender. The tympanum is visible. Skin on dorsum and limbs is smooth. The webbing between fingers and toes is reduced. The upper surfaces are green or violet brown. There is a narrow, oblique orange stripe running from the posterior border of eye to the arm insertion. The venter is immaculate.

== Habitat and conservation ==
Its natural habitats are streams in primary forest at elevations of 800–1,500 m (2,600–4,900 ft) above sea level. Tadpoles have been found in small pools in permanent streams. It is threatened by habitat degradation. The IUCN Red List of Threatened Species classifies this species as critically endangered because of its small range and because none have been sighted since the 1980s. The cause of its decline has not been confirmed, but it occurred in parallel with the arrival of the fungal disease chytridiomycosis. Scientists suspect that the frog is either extinct at present or has a population of no more that fifty mature individuals. They recommend that if further surveys do locate living frogs, they should be taken for an ex situ breeding program, and their offspring eventually relocated to suitable habitat.
