= Phasmahyla cruzi =

Mangaratiba tree frog

Conservation status
- Least Concern (IUCN 3.1)

Scientific classification
- Kingdom: Animalia
- Phylum: Chordata
- Class: Amphibia
- Order: Anura
- Family: Hylidae
- Genus: Phasmahyla
- Species: P. cruzi

Binomial name
- Phasmahyla cruzi Carvalho-e-Silva, Silva, and Carvalho-e-Silva, 2009
- Phasmahyla cruzi is only known from near Rio das Pedras Reserve in southeastern Brazil

Species of frog

Phasmahyla cruzi is a species of frog in the subfamily Phyllomedusinae. It is endemic to Brazil and solely known from the vicinity of its type locality, Rio das Pedras Reserve in the municipality of Mangaratiba, Rio de Janeiro state. The range extends into the adjacent Paraty municipality. This species is named for Carlos Alberto Gonçalves da Cruz, Brazilian herpetologist. The common name Mangaratiba tree frog has been proposed for it.

== Description ==
Adult males measure 31–34 mm (1.2–1.3 in) and adult females, based on a single specimen, about 42 mm (1.7 in) in snout–vent length. The body and limbs are slender. The snout is short and truncated. The eyes are large and protuberant. The tympanum is small and its upper part is hidden by the supratympanic fold. The fingers and the toes bear small terminal discs. No webbing is present. Skin is smooth. Dorsal coloration is light to dark green with light to dark purple dots. The concealed parts of the limbs and flanks are orange with many small purple spots. The belly is cream. The iris is silver-gray.

Tadpoles of Gosner stage 37 measure 40–46 mm (1.6–1.8 in) in total length, which includes the 13–16 mm (0.5–0.6 in) ovoid body. The mouth is anterodorsal and has a funnel-shaped dermal fold.

== Habitat and conservation ==
Phasmahyla cruzi have been collected from a stream with a sandy bottom at an elevation of about 200 m (660 ft) and higher. In general, Phasmahyla are associated with mountain streams in the Atlantic Forest domain. This frog has been found in closed-canopy forests and does not appear to tolerate the opening up of its habitat.

Scientists consider this frog not in danger of dying out because of its large range, which contains large amounts of suitable habitat.
