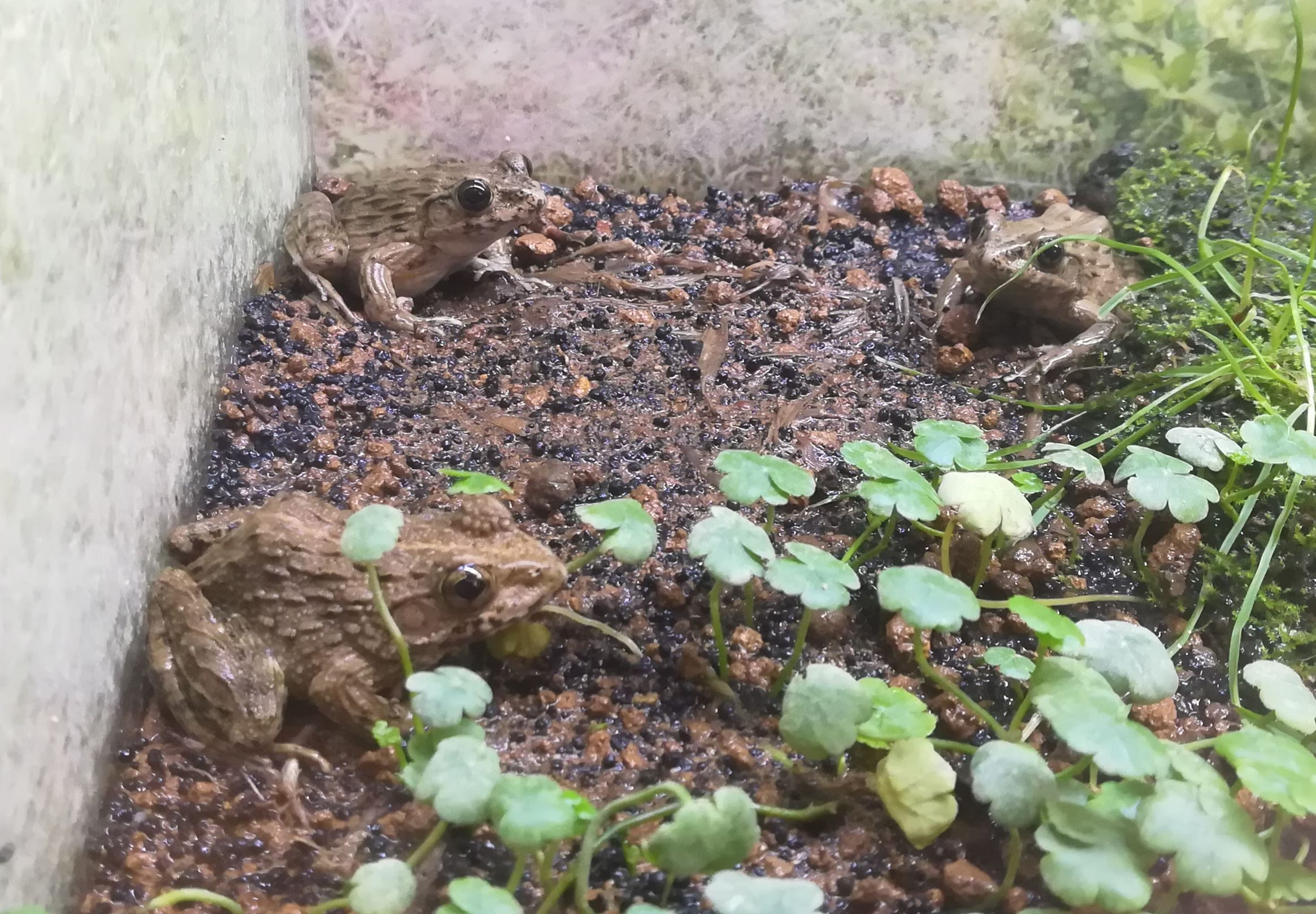

Scientific classification
- Domain: Eukaryota
- Kingdom: Animalia
- Phylum: Chordata
- Class: Amphibia
- Order: Anura
- Family: Ranidae
- Genus: Glandirana
- Species: G. susurra

Binomial name
- Glandirana susurra (Sekiya, Miura, and Ogata, 2012)

Synonyms
- Rugosa susurra Sekiya, Miura, and Ogata, 2012

= Glandirana susurra =

Species of frog

Glandirana susurra is a species of frog in the family Ranidae, the "true frogs". It is endemic to Sado Island, Japan. It is the only endemic amphibian of the island. It is genetically close to the widespread Glandirana rugosa, but it is morphologically distinguishable and postzygotically isolated from the latter species.

== Etymology ==
The specific name susurra is derived from the Latin susurrus meaning "whispering" and refers to the relatively quiet advertisement call of this species compared to those of other sympatric anuran (Hyla japonica and Rhacophorus arboreus).

== Evolution ==
Both Glandirana rugosa and Glandirana susurra are present on Sado Island, but their ranges do not overlap: G. susurra occurs on the central part of the island while G. rugosa in the south and in the north. Together with the fact that the race of G. rugosa on Sida Island is only distantly related to G. susurra, this suggests that G. susurra speciated on Sato Island before the invasion of the present G. rugosa lineage. Experiments suggest that the postzygotic reproductive isolation between these lineages is nearly perfect, although it remains to be confirmed that this also applies to specimens originating from areas near the species boundary.

== Description ==
Adult males measure 33–44 mm (1.3–1.7 in) and adult females 38–46 mm (1.5–1.8 in) in snout–vent length. The snout is rounded. The tympanum is distinct and the supratympanic fold is well-developed. The fingers and the toes are slender with slightly depressed tips; no webbing is present between the fingers while the toes have well-developed webbing. Dorsal skin has many dermal ridges of varying size. The dorsum is khaki-colored, whereas the abdomen is almost whitish anteriorly and yellow posteriorly. A mid-dorsal stripe is present in some individuals. Males lack vocal sac (present in G. rugosa).

Tadpoles of stages 41–42 measure about 23–27 mm (0.9–1.1 in) in body length.

== Habitat and conservation ==
Glandirana susurra occurs near various bodies of water, such as rice fields, small streams, and ponds. It is known from elevations between 11 and 187 m (36 and 614 ft) above sea level. Spawning occurs in ponds from middle May to early August. Adult frogs and at least some tadpoles spend their winter in the mud under water.

As of late 2019, this species has not been included in the IUCN Red List of Threatened Species.
