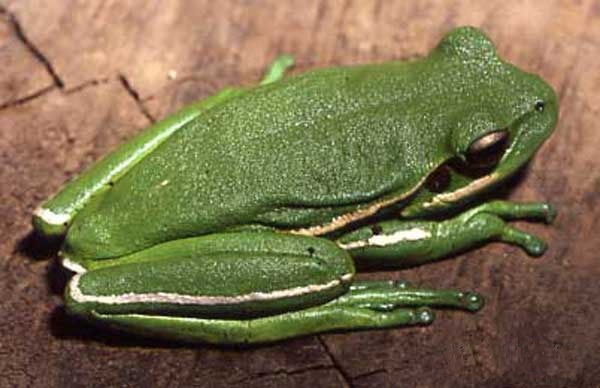

Conservation status
- Least Concern (IUCN 3.1)

Scientific classification
- Kingdom: Animalia
- Phylum: Chordata
- Class: Amphibia
- Order: Anura
- Family: Hylidae
- Genus: Boana
- Species: B. prasina

Binomial name
- Boana prasina (Burmeister, 1856)

Synonyms
- Hyla quoyi Bory de Saint-Vincent, 1828 – nomen oblitum (disputed); Hyla (Hyla) prasina Burmeister, 1856; Hypsiboas prasinus (Burmeister, 1856); Boana quoyi (Bory de Saint-Vincent, 1828)

= Boana prasina =

Species of amphibian

Boana prasina is a species of frog in the family Hylidae. It is endemic to southeastern Brazil and is observed in many Brazilian states: Minas Gerais, Rio de Janeiro, and São Paulo, and possibly further south. The common name of Boana prasina is Burmeister's treefrog.

Boana prasina occurs in forested habitats, grasslands, and pastureland at elevations of 800–1,400 m (2,600–4,600 ft) above sea level. These frogs are usually found on vegetation near ponds, pools, and lakes. B. prasina breeding takes place in permanent pools and small streams. The egg clutches of B. prasina are attached to vegetation in the water.

Boana prasina is a common species, although certain populations seem to have disappeared. The species is threatened by water pollution and habitat loss caused by fire. It is present in several protected areas.

It was recently discovered that the odor secretions by B. prasina vary based on sex. This observation is interesting because the secretion by either sex are from the same source: mutualism with the bacteria Pseudomonas. Pseudomonas has evolved to produce different levels of particular volatile compounds based on the sex of its host, and it is possible it also plays a role in sex variation during early stages.

Hypsiboas prasinus is also used to refer to this frog.

== Description ==
B. prasina is a medium sized frog measuring 4 to 5 cm long. It is usually light brown with dark scattered spots across its back, but can also be brown, yellow or green. The belly of B. prasina is a lighter shade than the back. B. prasina has also been referred to as the rattle-voiced tree frog because of its call, which follows a rattle-like beat. The frogs typically croak when in low vegetation at the edge of water, although now appear in artificial garden lakes and lawns. The frog is generally nocturnal, sometimes appearing at dusk.

== Habitat and distribution ==
=== Habitat ===
B. prasina is limited to the elevated regions of southeastern Brazil. However, it does live in a wide variety of habitats including lakes/ponds, fields, pastures, muddy soils, and forests. They can be found both on the ground or in trees. In forests, it usually inhabits open areas or the edges. The forests are always very close to water, and are either riparian or gallery forests.

=== Distribution ===
A study of tadpole abundance in the Atlantic Forest habitats of southern Brazil only found two groups of B. prasina tadpoles in 25 breeding sites observed, of about 70 individuals each. Although the 25 breeding sites were evenly distributed between ponds and streams, the B. prasina tadpoles were only found living in streams.

== Conservation ==
B. prasina is classified by the IUCN as of Least Concern. Despite this classification, B. prasina has suffered habitat loss due to widespread deforestation in Brazil. A record of frog species observed in the municipalities of Ourinhos, Cornélio Procópio, and Londrina between October 2010 and February 2011 found that when B. prasina was present in the municipality (not the case for Ourinhos) it did not live in urban or agricultural landscapes. It was found at forest edges and forests themselves. It seems B. prasina does not adapt well to anthropogenic landscapes, and thus expansion of those landscapes drives habitat loss.

== Phylogeny ==
B. prasina belongs to the B. pulchella group and is the name of one of the five clades defined within it. Its closest relatives are B. bischoffi, B. caingua, B. cordobae, B. goiana, B. guentheri, B. marginata, B. phaeopleura, B. prasina, B. pulchella, and one undescribed species. There is genetic support for a common ancestor unifying the B. prasina and B. riojana clades monophyletically. Like B. prasina, many other species within the group have the ability to produce smells. These smells can be produced when handled. Another common trait that unifies the B. prasina clade (and the B. polytaenia clade) is the loss of the fourth posterior tooth row during the larval stage.

== Home range and territoriality ==
B. prasina does not seem to have any territoriality. While rivalry among males is often a key component of sexual selection, this does not appear to be as present in B. prasina. One study proposed that the calling of B. prasina was an honest communication of the individual male's health. The study found male B. prasina had a higher calling rate with lower parasite intensity.

== Diet ==
Tadpoles of B. prasina have fewer labial tooth rows than other tree frog species. Having fewer labial tooth rows may make feeding from three-dimensionally irregularly shaped surfaces, like algae, more efficient.

Adult B. prasina feed on small insects and other arthropods.

It has been suggested that the differences in secretions between male and female B. prasina are due to differences in their diet or how they spend their time. However, this explanation seems unlikely as differences in diet occur during early infancy.

== Mating ==
B. prasina uses croaking to communicate in many ways, mostly in regards to mating. The calls have been divided into different types, including an introductory advertisement call (Type A call), a chorus advertisement call (Type B call), a resuming activity advertisement call (Type C call), and an agonistic call. B. prasina can mate and reproduce year-round, and thus calling is observed throughout the year. Seasonal changes do not have a change on calling activity/rates. However, seasonal changes have other effects. It was found that the cold dry season caused some B. prasina to shift closer to the water surface. This made calls lower pitched and longer. B. prasina that called during the winter were significantly larger than those calling in the summer. The metabolic rate of B. prasina, including heart and liver activity, varies seasonally.

B. prasina individuals call from a variety of locations, varying from vegetation above the ground to on the ground or on the surface of water. Around a singular body of water, such as a permanent lake, there may be up to 30 calling males, with females remaining silent. In addition to differences in calling, the sexual dimorphism in odor profiles produced on the skin by the bacteria Pseudomonas could potentially play a role in mating as sex hormones.

== Parental care ==
B. prasina are oviparous. It lays its eggs on submerged vegetation.

== Mutualisms ==
B. prasina has a mutualistic relationship with the bacteria Pseudomonas. This is not especially rare in amphibians, and often the presence of Pseudomonas has important benefits to the host's health. In some frogs Pseudomonas inhibits the growth of fungal pathogens, or may provide the host with a toxin that has the ability to ward off predators. In the case of B. prasina, it is not yet known how the presence of Pseudomonas on the skin and the odorous chemicals it produces benefit the frog. Since there are differences in the concentrations of different odor proteins based on the sex of the host, it is conjectured that Pseudomonas plays a role in sex interactions. What is known is that B. prasina produces antimicrobial-peptides as part of its own immune system which have selective inhibitory effects that debilitate species that would compete with Pseudomonas on the frog's skin.

== Enemies ==
B. prasina suffers from parasitic infections by helminths. Helminths are a frequent parasite of amphibians because of the vulnerable nature of amphibian skin. Amphibian skin is vulnerable due to the ease at which molecules can pass through it. The cosmocercid nematodes were the most numerous parasite found in B. prasina in a 2012 study. All cosmocercids found in B. prasina were female, a feature that is observed across other frogs infected by cosmocercid nematodes. Cosmocercid nematodes are most likely the most numerous parasite because of their active mechanism of infection – they are capable of moving and infecting through the skin, whereas other helminths must be ingested as eggs in order to infect the frog. There are at least four helminth taxa that prey on B. prasina.

== Protective coloration and behavior ==
Common B. prasina colorations – light and dark brown, green, yellow – are all useful for camouflage in the wetlands they inhabit. However, B. prasina is quite solid in color except for small dark spots on its back, and does not have very cryptic coloration. An interesting feature is that the color varies depending on season, where green coloration is present in higher numbers during the rainy season, while brown is present during the dry season – matching the prevalence of those leaf colors in the habitat.

B. prasina calling is also quite distinct, and when overlapping with close relative B. pulchella it was observed that all calling types were quite distinct from those of B. pulchella.
