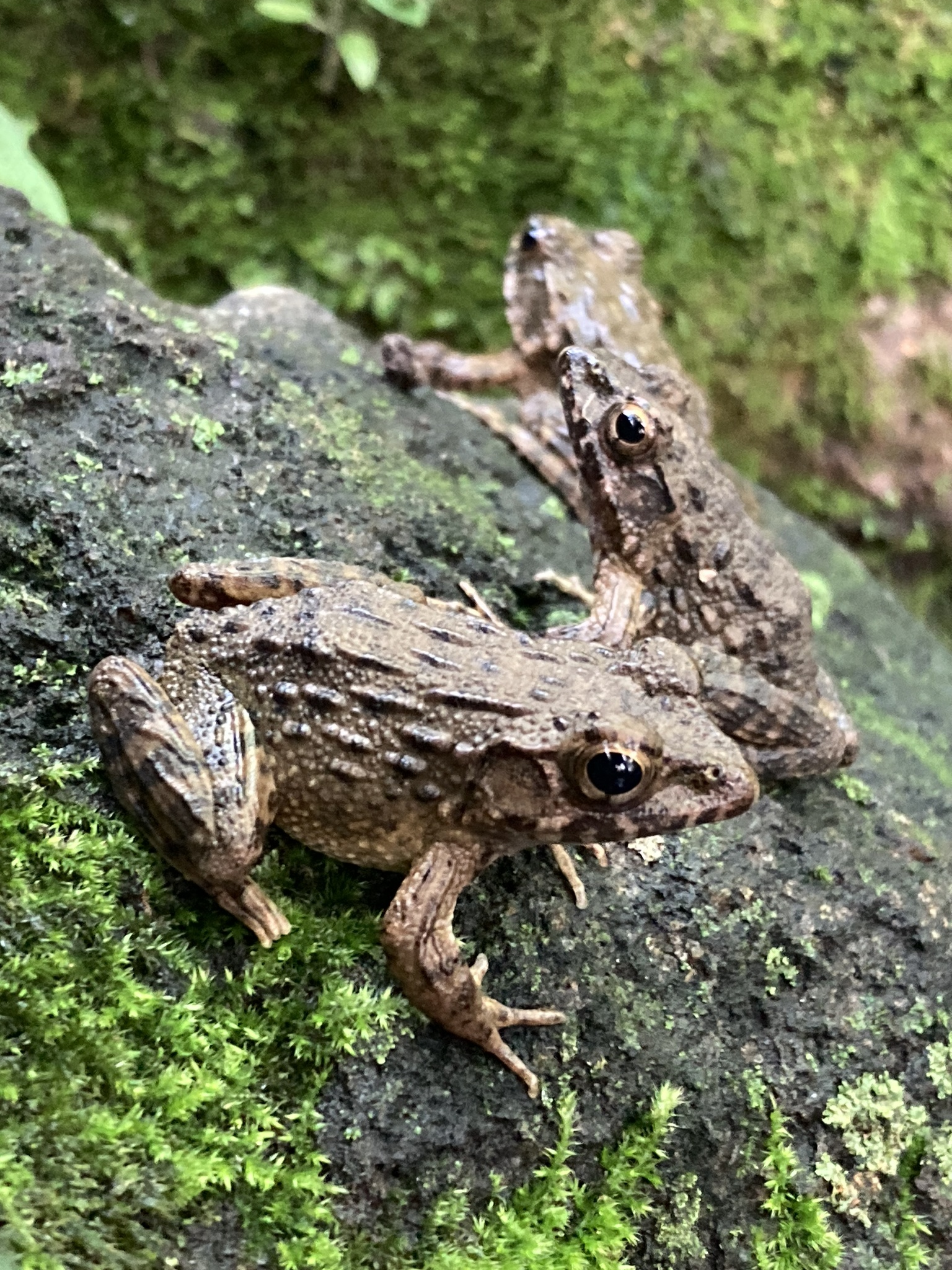
- Glandirana rugosa

Scientific classification
- Kingdom: Animalia
- Phylum: Chordata
- Class: Amphibia
- Order: Anura
- Family: Ranidae
- Genus: Glandirana; Fei, Ye, and Huang, 1990

Type species
- Rana minima

Synonyms
- Rugosa Fei, Ye, and Huang, 1990

= Glandirana =

Genus of amphibians

Glandirana is a genus of true frogs (family Ranidae) found in the East Asia (eastern China, Korea, Japan, and possibly Primorsky Krai in the Russian Far East). The name means ‘glandular frog’.

== Taxonomy and systematics ==
The genus Glandirana was split off from Rana. All species, except the more recently described Glandirana susurra and Glandirana reliquia, were originally included in Rana; some of them were placed in genus Rugosa, which is now synonymized with Glandirana. Although the monophyly of the genus has been questioned, it is supported by recent molecular work. Glandirana is considered likely to be a sister taxon of the genus Hylarana.

=== Species ===
The following species are recognised in the genus Glandirana:

- Glandirana emeljanovi (Nikolskii, 1913)
- Glandirana minima (Ting and T'sai, 1979)
- Glandirana reliquia Shimada, Matsui, Ogata, and Miura, 2022
- Glandirana rugosa (Temminck and Schlegel, 1838)
- Glandirana susurra (Sekiya, Miura, and Ogata, 2012)
- Glandirana tientaiensis (Chang, 1933)
