= Aplastodiscus heterophonicus =

Scientific classification
- Domain: Eukaryota
- Kingdom: Animalia
- Phylum: Chordata
- Class: Amphibia
- Order: Anura
- Family: Hylidae
- Genus: Aplastodiscus
- Species: A. heterophonicus

Binomial name
- Aplastodiscus heterophonicus Pinheiro, Pezzuti, Berneck, Lyra, Lima, and Leite, 2021

Species of amphibian

Aplastodiscus heterophonicus is a species of frog endemic to Brazil. It has been observed in the Espinhaço mountains between 608 and 1326 meters above sea level.

== Original description ==
- Pinheiro P.D.P.; Pezzuti T. L.; von M. Berneck B.; Lyra M.L.; Lima R. C. L.; Leite F. S. F. (2021). "A new cryptic species of the Aplastodiscus albosignatus group (Anura: Hylidae)". Salamandra. 57 (1): 27–43. doi:10.5281/zenodo.4541651. S2CID 245002274.
