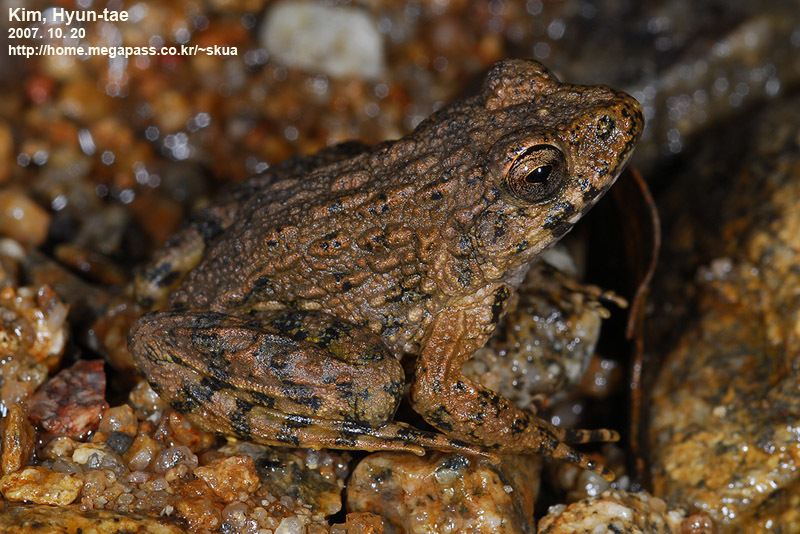

Conservation status
- Least Concern (IUCN 3.1)

Scientific classification
- Kingdom: Animalia
- Phylum: Chordata
- Class: Amphibia
- Order: Anura
- Family: Ranidae
- Genus: Glandirana
- Species: G. emeljanovi

Binomial name
- Glandirana emeljanovi (Nikolsky, 1913)

= Imienpo Station frog =

Species of amphibian

The Imienpo Station frog (Glandirana emeljanovi) is a species of frog found in Northeast Asia. It has sometimes been regarded as a subspecies of the Japanese wrinkled frog, Glandirana rugosa, with which it shares many characteristics. It is found throughout the Korean Peninsula and adjacent northeast China. It is speculated to be or have been present in the Russian Primorye region as well but attempts to find it there have been unsuccessful.

The Imienpo Station frog is found at low elevations, from 100 to 300 meters above sea level. It favors still and slow-moving waters, such as river backwaters and rice paddies. Adult frogs are 4–6 cm in length. They lay eggs in the late spring, from late April to the end of May. The tadpoles overwinter in their immature state, only undergoing metamorphosis the following summer.

Like the Japanese wrinkled frog, the Imienpo Station frog has wrinkled skin with irregular dark blotches. They are poisonous, like toads, and generally sluggish.
