= Phasmahyla jandaia =

Conservation status
- Least Concern (IUCN 3.1)

Scientific classification
- Kingdom: Animalia
- Phylum: Chordata
- Class: Amphibia
- Order: Anura
- Family: Phyllomedusidae
- Genus: Phasmahyla
- Species: P. jandaia

Binomial name
- Phasmahyla jandaia (Bokermann & Sazima, 1978)

Species of frog

Phasmahyla jandaia is a species of frog in the subfamily Phyllomedusinae. It is endemic to Brazil, where it has only been observed more than 1000 meters above sea level.

This frog has been observed in streams flowing through Atlantic forests and savanna. The female frog lays eggs on leaves overhanging streams. When the eggs hatch, the tadpoles fall into the water below.

Scientists have documented several types of chemicals on this frog's skin, but they do not believe anyone is collecting frogs to harvest them.

Scientists believe this frog is not in danger of extinction because it has been found surviving in habitats that humans have changed. They cite mining as the only threat to this species.
