= Glandirana minima =

Fujian frog

Conservation status
- Endangered (IUCN 3.1)

Scientific classification
- Kingdom: Animalia
- Phylum: Chordata
- Class: Amphibia
- Order: Anura
- Family: Ranidae
- Genus: Glandirana
- Species: G. minima

Binomial name
- Glandirana minima (Ting & Tsai, 1979)

Synonyms
- Rana minima Ting & Tsai, 1979

Species of amphibian

Glandirana minima (known as Fujian frog or little gland frog) is a species of frog in the family Ranidae. It is endemic to the eastern parts of the Fujian province, China, (in Fuzhou, Fuqing, Yongtai and Changle, Xianyou). Its natural habitats are rivers, swamps, freshwater marshes, intermittent freshwater marshes, ponds, and irrigated land. It is threatened by habitat loss.

Glandirana minima is a small frog: male frogs are 27 mm (1.1 in) and females frogs 29 mm (1.1 in) long.
