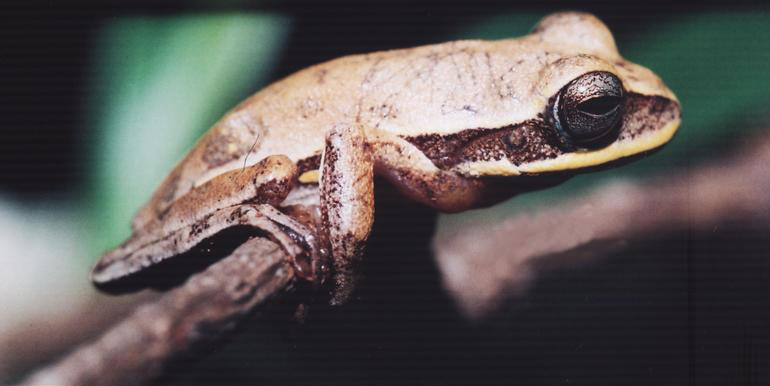

Conservation status
- Endangered (IUCN 3.1)

Scientific classification
- Kingdom: Animalia
- Phylum: Chordata
- Class: Amphibia
- Order: Anura
- Family: Hylidae
- Genus: Boana
- Species: B. ericae

Binomial name
- Boana ericae (Caramaschi and Cruz, 2000)

Synonyms
- Hyla ericae Caramaschi and Cruz, 2000; Hypsiboas ericae (Caramaschi and Cruz, 2000)

= Boana ericae =

Species of frog

Boana ericae is a species of frog in the family Hylidae. It is endemic to Brazil and only known from its type locality, Chapada dos Veadeiros National Park in the Goiás state. The specific name ericae honors Erica Maria Pellegrini Caramaschi, a Brazilian ichthyologist (and presumably the spouse of U. Caramaschi).

== Habitat and conservation ==
Boana ericae occurs in gallery forests along streams at about 1,200 m (3,900 ft) above sea level. It breeds in the same habitat. It is a common species, but its habitat is threatened by logging, mining, and fires. Nevertheless, the type locality is within a protected area.
