= Rough-skinned frog =

Rough-skinned frog may refer to:

- Rough-skinned bush frog (Raorchestes glandulosus), a frog in the family Rhacophoridae endemic to the Western Ghats, India
- Rough-skinned floating frog (Occidozyga lima), a frog in the family Dicroglossidae found in Bangladesh, Cambodia, China, Hong Kong, India, Indonesia, Laos, Malaysia, Myanmar, Thailand, Vietnam, and possibly Nepal
- Tientai rough-skinned frog (Glandirana tientaiensis), a frog in the family Ranidae endemic to eastern China, found the Zhejiang and Anhui provinces
