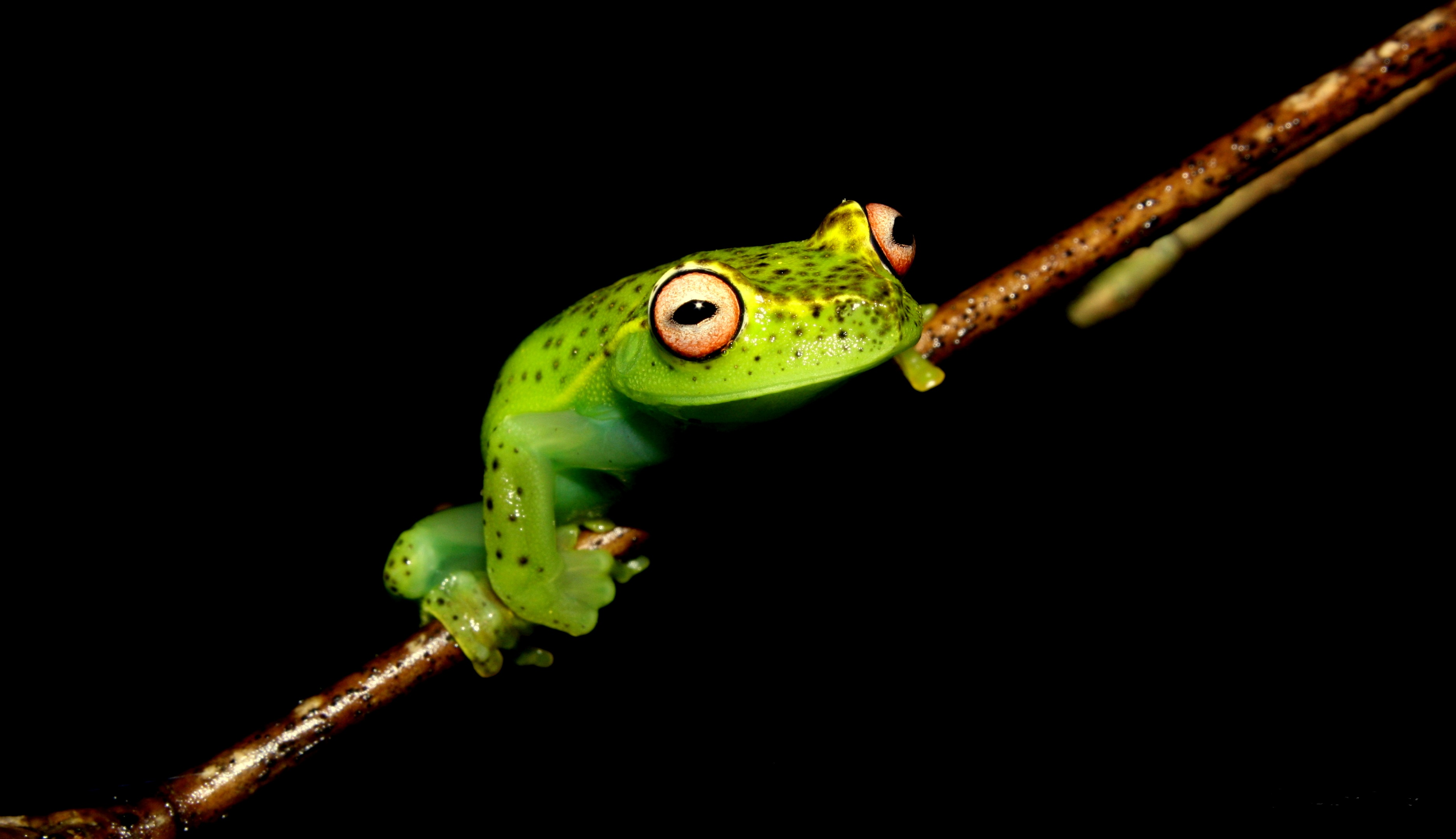

Conservation status
- Least Concern (IUCN 3.1)

Scientific classification
- Kingdom: Animalia
- Phylum: Chordata
- Class: Amphibia
- Order: Anura
- Family: Hylidae
- Genus: Aplastodiscus
- Species: A. arildae

Binomial name
- Aplastodiscus arildae (Cruz & Peixoto, 1987)

Synonyms
- Hyla arildae Cruz and Peixoto, 1987 "1985"; Boana arildae

= Aplastodiscus arildae =

Species of frog

Aplastodiscus arildae is a species of frog in the family Hylidae. It is endemic to southeastern Brazil with records from Serra do Mar, Serra da Mantiqueira, Serra do Espinhaço, and Serra do Japi. The specific name arildae honors Arilda M. G. da Cruz, wife of one of the authors.

== Description ==
Aplastodiscus arildae in the type series measure 36–41 mm (1.4–1.6 in) in snout–vent length. In a sample from Serra do Japi, males measured 34–38 mm (1.3–1.5 in) and a single female measured 40 mm (1.6 in). Larger male size (41–42 mm (1.6–1.7 in)) has been reported from near the type locality. The overall appearance is slender. The head is as wide as it is long. The canthus rostralis is distinct. The tympanum and supratympanic fold are distinct. The fingers and toes are partially webbed and bear terminal discs. Overall coloration is green. A thick yellowish line runs from the canthus rostralis, bordering the edge of the upper eyelid, and extending over the supratympanic fold.

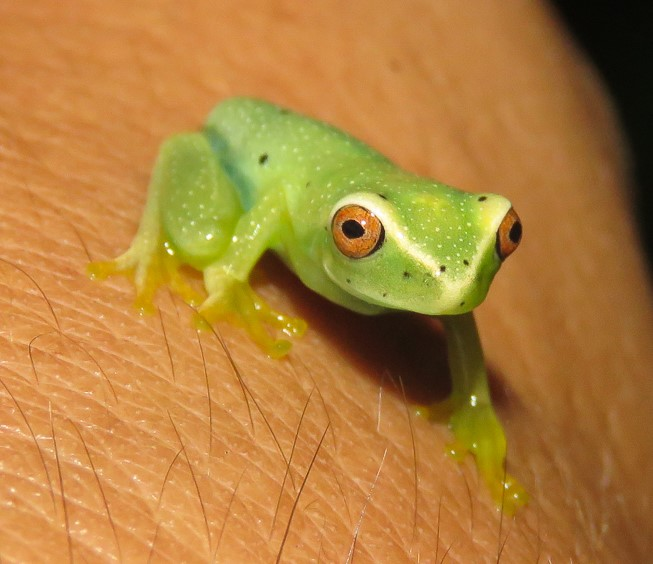

This species has three call types: advertisement call, courtship call, and territorial calls. The advertisement call in Serra do Japi is a single-note call with two harmonics (at 879 and 2077 Hz, the latter dominant), emitted at a mean rate of 41 calls/minute. The advertisement call from near the type locality had variable number (3–10) of harmonics, with the dominant harmonics at 2413 Hz. The courtship call is similar to the advertisement call but emitted at a higher rate. The territorial calls consist of three or four calls with three harmonics and can be triggered by playback of male advertisement calls and can be heard under great choir activity.

== Habitat and conservation ==
Aplastodiscus arildae inhabits primary and secondary forests at elevations of 800–1,500 m (2,600–4,900 ft) above sea level. Males call from high in the canopy or from streamside vegetation. Breeding takes place in permanent streams where also the tadpoles develop.

It is a very common but forest-dependent species; land use change is only a localized threat to this widepsread species. Furthermore, it occurs in many protected areas.
