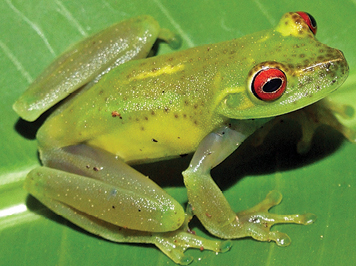

Conservation status
- Least Concern (IUCN 3.1)

Scientific classification
- Kingdom: Animalia
- Phylum: Chordata
- Class: Amphibia
- Order: Anura
- Family: Hylidae
- Genus: Aplastodiscus
- Species: A. weygoldti

Binomial name
- Aplastodiscus weygoldti (Cruz & Peixoto, 1985)

= Aplastodiscus weygoldti =

Species of frog

Aplastodiscus weygoldti, or Weygoldt's tree frog, is a species of frog in the family Hylidae. It is endemic to Brazil. Its natural habitats are subtropical or tropical moist lowland forests and rivers. It is threatened by habitat loss.
