= Carlos Alberto Gonçalves da Cruz =

Brazilian herpetologist (born 1944)

- Born: 1944 (age 81–82)
- Occupation: Herpetologist

Carlos Alberto Gonçalves da Cruz (born 1944) is a Brazilian herpetologist. He works at the National Museum in Rio de Janeiro.

== Taxa named in Cruz's honor ==
- Craugastor cruzi (McCranie, Savage & Wilson, 1989)
- Hyla cruzi (Pombal & Bastos, 1998)
- Chiasmocleis crucis (Caramaschi & Pimenta, 2003)

== Taxa described ==
- Chiasmocleis alagoanus
- Chiasmocleis atlantica
- Chiasmocleis capixaba
- Chiasmocleis carvalhoi
- Chiasmocleis jimi
- Chiasmocleis mehelyi
- Hyla arildae
- Hyla buriti
- Hyla callipygia
- Hyla cavicola
- Hyla ericae
- Hyla fluminea
- Hyla gouveai
- Hyla ibirapitanga
- Hyla leucopygia
- Hyla phaeopleura
- Hyla pseudomeridiana
- Hyla sibilata
- Hyla stenocephala
- Hyla weygoldti
- Hylomantis granulosa
- Melanophryniscus simplex
- Melanophryniscus spectabilis
- Phasmahyla exilis
- Phrynohyas lepida
- Phrynomedusa bokermanni
- Phrynomedusa marginata
- Phrynomedusa vanzolinii
- Phyllodytes brevirostris
- Phyllodytes kautskyi
- Plectrohyla chrysopleura
- Proceratophrys phyllostomus
- Proceratophrys subguttata
- Pseudis tocantins
- Scinax agilis
