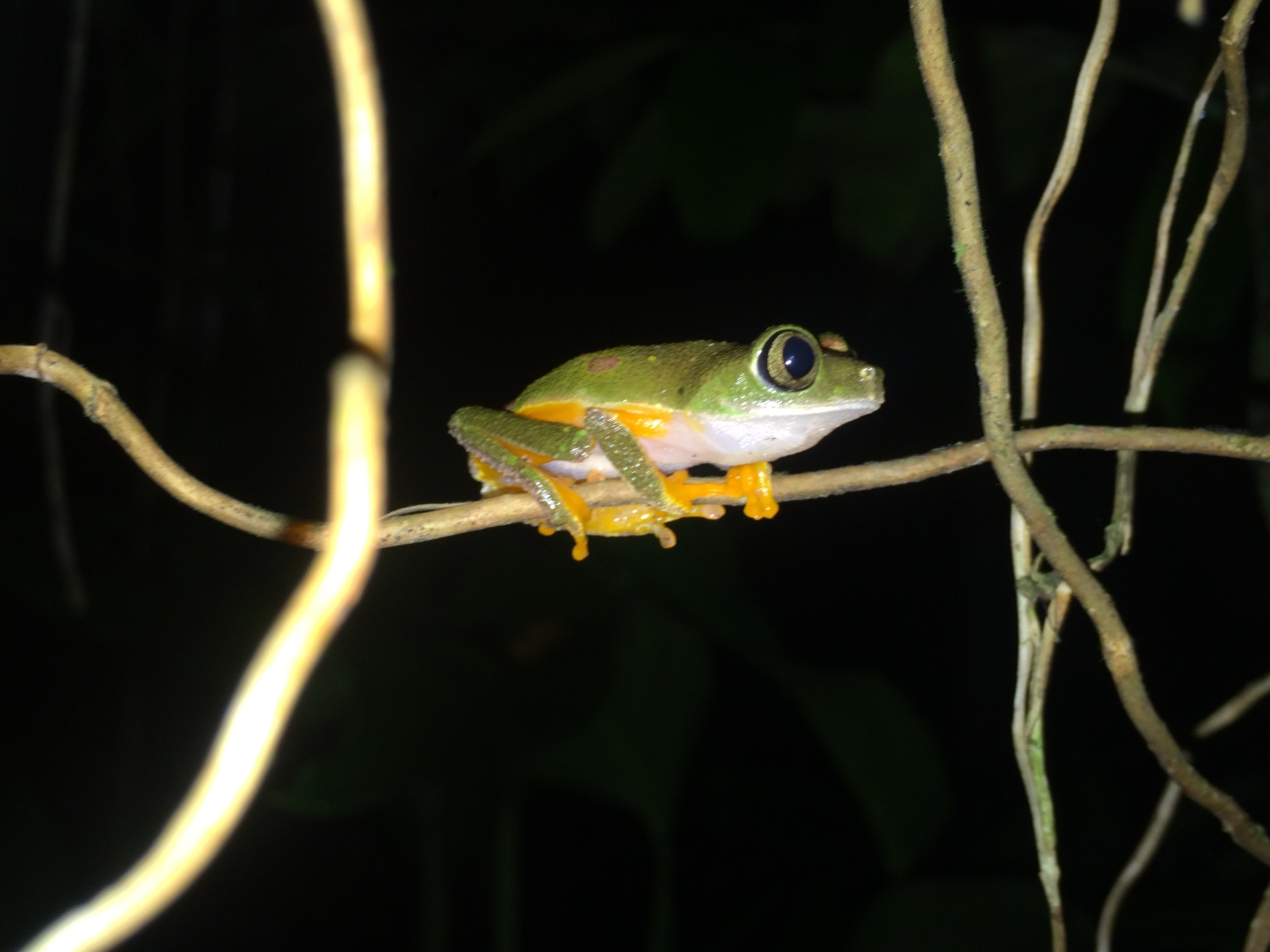

Conservation status
- Least Concern (IUCN 3.1)

Scientific classification
- Kingdom: Animalia
- Phylum: Chordata
- Class: Amphibia
- Order: Anura
- Family: Phyllomedusidae
- Genus: Hylomantis
- Species: H. granulosa

Binomial name
- Hylomantis granulosa (Cruz, 1989)

Synonyms
- Agalychnis granulosa (Cruz, 1989)

= Hylomantis granulosa =

Species of frog

Hylomantis granulosa, also known as the granular leaf frog, is a species of frog in the subfamily Phyllomedusinae. It is endemic to eastern Brazil where it is only known from Amargosa, Bahia, and Recife; the type locality is the Zoo Botanical Park Dois Irmãos in Recife. Scientists have observed this frog as high as 700 meters above sea level.

This frog lives in forests, including secondary forests and forest edges. The female frog lays eggs in cracks in rocks, in depressions, or on low branches. The tadpoles develop in streams or temporary ponds.

This frog is not classified as threatened, but human beings do cut down the forests in its habitat for agriculture, grazing, and towns.
