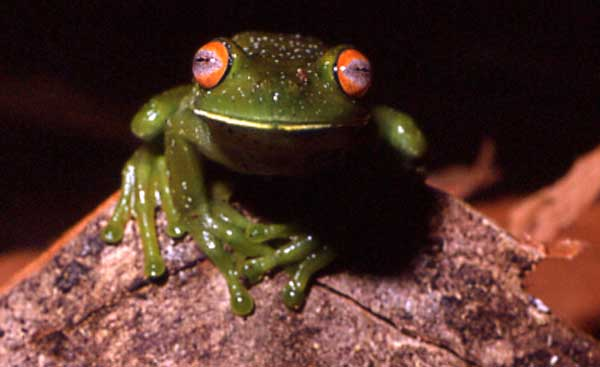

Conservation status
- Least Concern (IUCN 3.1)

Scientific classification
- Kingdom: Animalia
- Phylum: Chordata
- Class: Amphibia
- Order: Anura
- Family: Hylidae
- Genus: Aplastodiscus
- Species: A. albosignatus

Binomial name
- Aplastodiscus albosignatus (A. Lutz & B. Lutz, 1938)

Synonyms
- Aplastodiscus callipygius (Cruz & Peixoto, 1984)

= Aplastodiscus albosignatus =

Species of amphibian

Aplastodiscus albosignatus, also known as the Bocaina treefrog, is a species of frog in the family Hylidae. It is endemic to Brazil. Its natural habitats are subtropical or tropical moist lowland forests, subtropical or tropical moist montane forests, and rivers. It is threatened by habitat loss.

== Description ==
The Bocaina treefrog can grow to a snout-to-vent length of about 5 cm (2.0 in). It has a broad head and pointed snout, and vomerine teeth situated on the roof of its mouth. The large, bulging eyes have golden irises with a horizontal slit pupil, and the tympanum is easily discernible. There is a single vocal sac in the throat. Not only is the general colour of this frog green, but its muscles and bones are green, as well. Several species of closely related tree frogs inhabit the Brazilian forest habitat. The Bocaina treefrog has distinctive, large granulations in the region of its cloacal vent, which helps to distinguish it from other species. Its tadpoles are also distinctive.

== Distribution ==
The Bocaina treefrog is an arboreal species known from the mountainous parts of south-eastern Brazil at up to 1,800 metres (5,900 ft) above sea level. Much of its range is in national parks, such as the Serra da Bocaina National Park, from where it was first described. Its habitat is in both virgin forests and old secondary growth forests near mountain streams. It does not generally occur in agricultural areas or near human settlements.

== Reproduction ==
Breeding takes place between September and February. The male calls at night from among rocks or from the banks of streams in forests. The eggs are laid in underground nests in the muddy bank, and the developing tadpoles live on the bottom of the stream. They undergo metamorphosis when about 21 mm (0.83 in) long.

== Status ==
Aplastodiscus albosignatus is listed as being of Least Concern in the IUCN Red List of Threatened Species, and is a common species within its range. The population seems to be declining, but not at a sufficiently fast rate to warrant a higher threat categorization.
