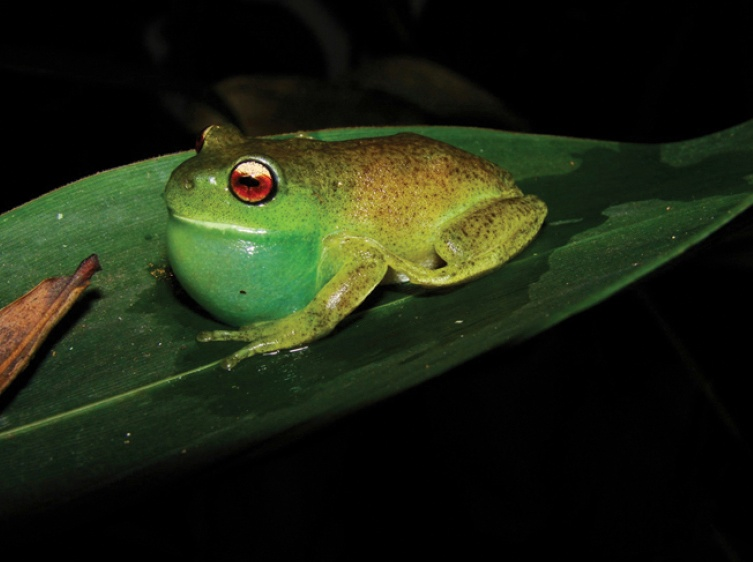
- Male calling

Scientific classification
- Kingdom: Animalia
- Phylum: Chordata
- Class: Amphibia
- Order: Anura
- Family: Hylidae
- Genus: Aplastodiscus
- Species: A. lutzorum

Binomial name
- Aplastodiscus lutzorum Berneck, Giaretta, Brandão, Cruz, and Haddad, 2017
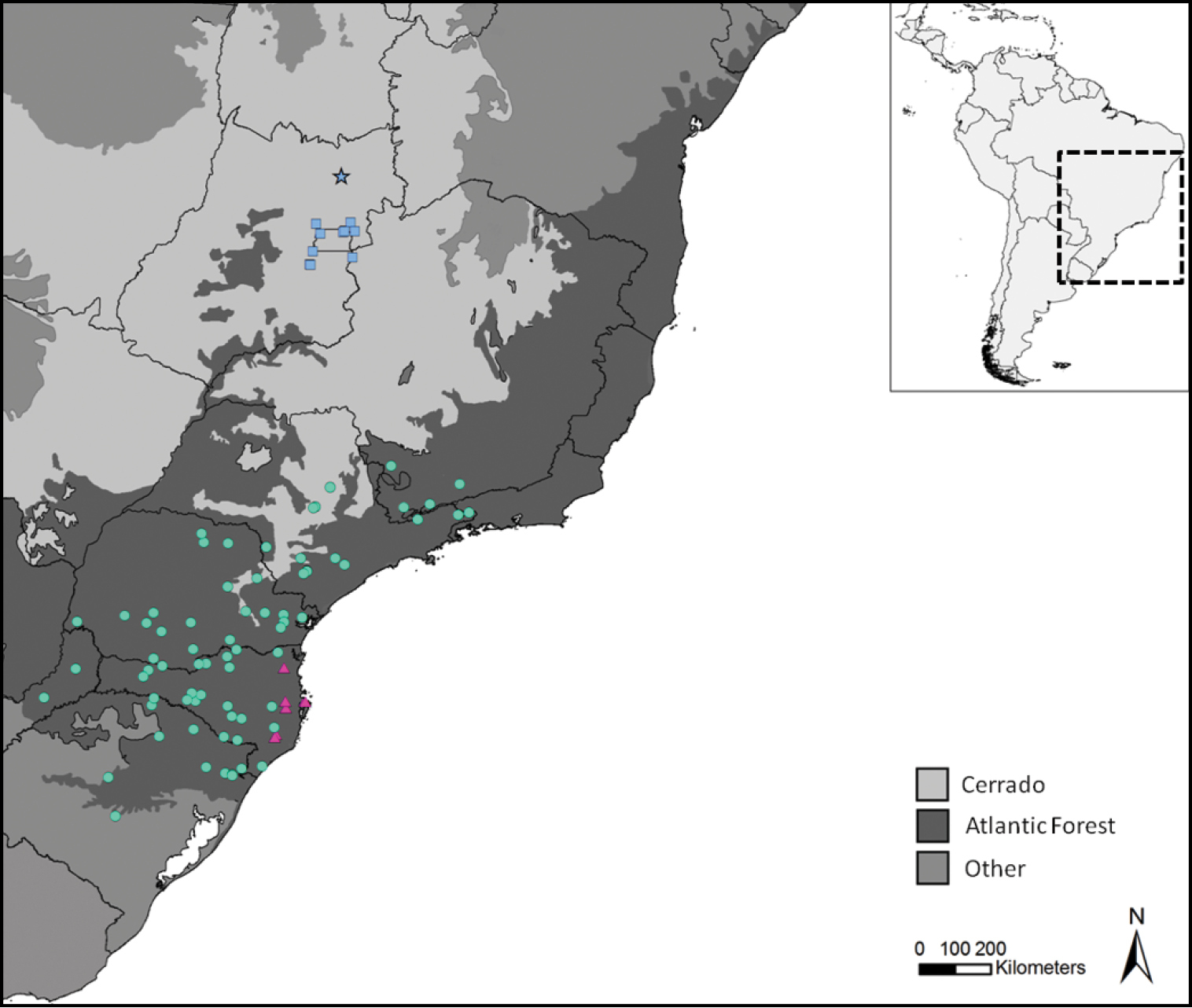
- The blue squares correspond to their distribution

= Aplastodiscus lutzorum =

Species of amphibian

Aplastodiscus lutzorum is a species of frogs in the family Hylidae. It is endemic to the Cerrado region in Brazil and is known from the Federal District and the adjacent eastern Goiás and northwestern Minas Gerais states. The specific name lutzorum honors Adolfo and Bertha Lutz, Brazilian zoologists.

== Description ==
Adult males measure 31–36 mm (1.2–1.4 in) and adult females, base on a single specimen only, about 34 mm (1.3 in) in snout–vent length. The snout is nearly rounded. The tympanum is distinct, as is the supratympanic fold. The fingers and the toes are long and bear terminal discs; webbing is reduced and no lateral fringes are present. Skin of the head and the dorsum is smooth but granular elsewhere. The upper surfaces are yellowish green with small and scattered melanophores, turning dark green in the head. The eye is surrounded by a black ring. The iris is golden in its upper third and red copper below. The underparts are uniformly pale yellow. Males have a single, subgular vocal sac that is bluish green.

== Habitat and conservation ==
Aplastodiscus lutzorum is known from gallery forests with scattered Mauritia flexuosa palm trees within the Cerrado biome at elevations of 1,000 m (3,300 ft) or more. Males call during the night perched on leaves or branches as high as 5 m (16 ft) above the water level. As of late 2018, the species had not been included in the IUCN Red List of Threatened Species, but Berneck and colleagues suggest it should be considered of "least concern", because most of the know occurrences are inside protected areas, including the Chapada dos Veadeiros National Park.
