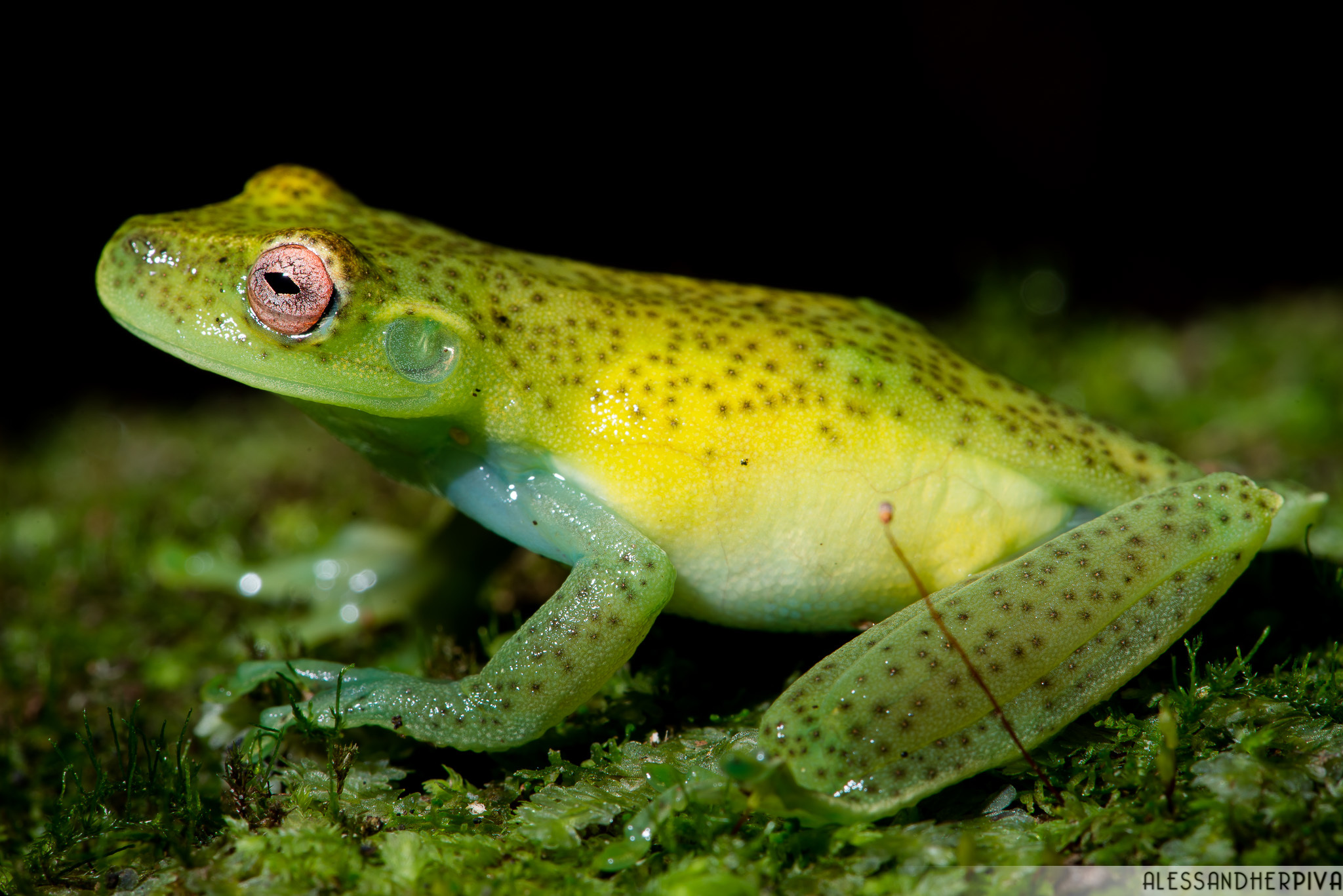

Conservation status
- Least Concern (IUCN 3.1)

Scientific classification
- Kingdom: Animalia
- Phylum: Chordata
- Class: Amphibia
- Order: Anura
- Family: Hylidae
- Genus: Aplastodiscus
- Species: A. ehrhardti

Binomial name
- Aplastodiscus ehrhardti (Muller, 1924)

Synonyms
- Hyla arianae Cruz & Peixoto, 1985

= Aplastodiscus ehrhardti =

Species of frog

Aplastodiscus ehrhardti is a species of frog in the family Hylidae. It is endemic to Brazil. Its natural habitats are subtropical or tropical moist lowland forests and intermittent freshwater marshes. It is threatened by habitat loss; however, despite this, it remains in the "Least Concern" category "in view of its relatively wide distribution, presumed large population, and because it is unlikely to be declining fast enough to qualify for listing in a more threatened category".
