= Phrynomedusa bokermanni =

Conservation status
- Data Deficient (IUCN 3.1)

Scientific classification
- Kingdom: Animalia
- Phylum: Chordata
- Class: Amphibia
- Order: Anura
- Family: Phyllomedusidae
- Genus: Phrynomedusa
- Species: P. bokermanni

Binomial name
- Phrynomedusa bokermanni Cruz, 1991

Species of amphibian

Phrynomedusa bokermanni, Bokermann's leaf frog, is a species of frog in the subfamily Phyllomedusinae. It is endemic to Brazil.

Scientists have only collected one specimen, in 1978. The type locality was in Mongaguá, in the state of São Paulo. Scientists do not know much about its habitat or habits.
