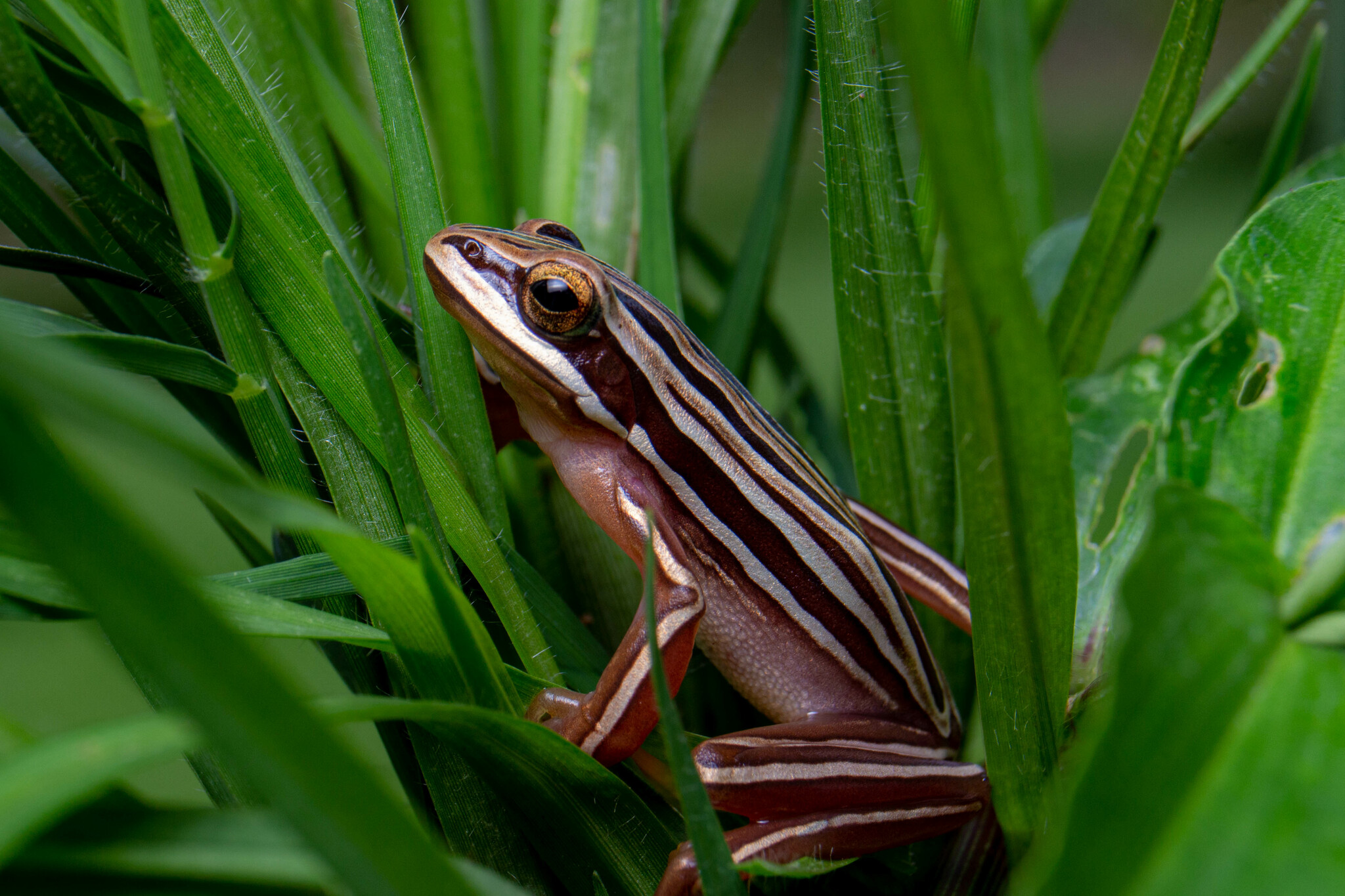

Conservation status
- Least Concern (IUCN 3.1)

Scientific classification
- Kingdom: Animalia
- Phylum: Chordata
- Class: Amphibia
- Order: Anura
- Family: Hylidae
- Genus: Boana
- Species: B. stenocephala

Binomial name
- Boana stenocephala (Caramaschi & Cruz, 1999)

Synonyms
- Hypsiboas stenocephalus (Caramaschi & Cruz, 1999)

= Boana stenocephala =

Species of frog

Boana stenocephala is a species of frog in the family Hylidae that is endemic to Brazil. Its natural habitats are moist savanna and rivers, and is threatened by habitat loss.
