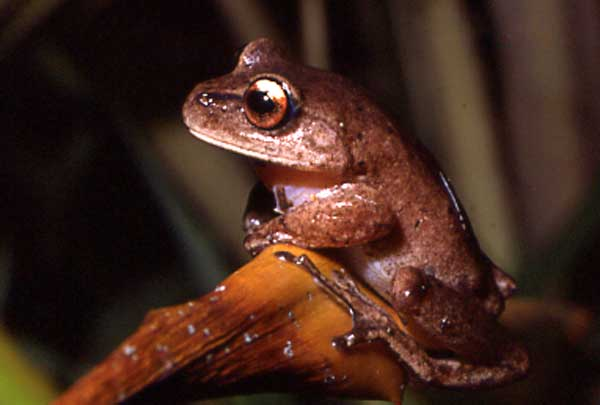

Conservation status
- Least Concern (IUCN 3.1)

Scientific classification
- Kingdom: Animalia
- Phylum: Chordata
- Class: Amphibia
- Order: Anura
- Family: Hylidae
- Genus: Aplastodiscus
- Species: A. cochranae

Binomial name
- Aplastodiscus cochranae (Mertens, 1952)
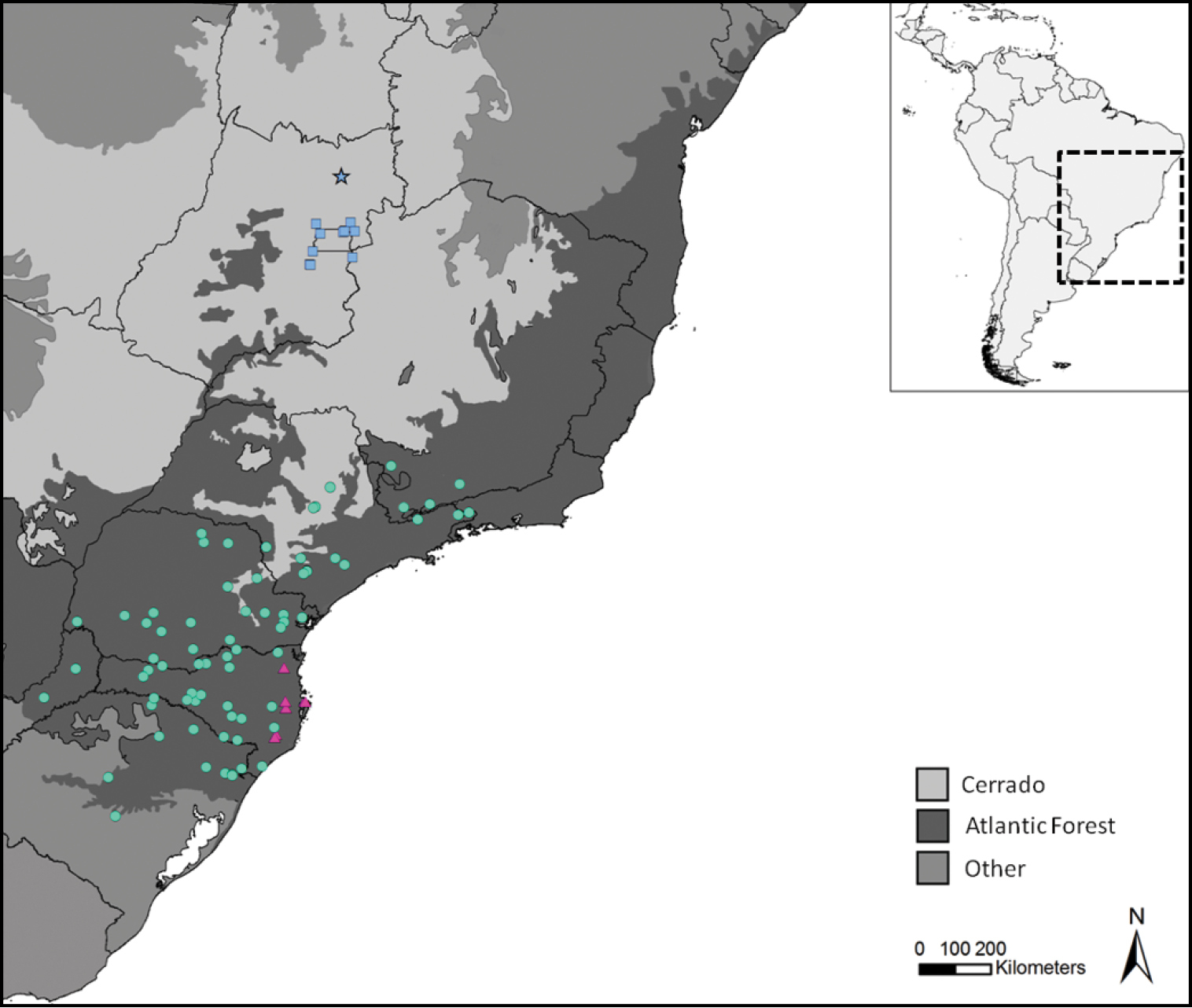
- The species is found in pink triangles.

Synonyms
- Hyla cochranae Mertens, 1952

= Aplastodiscus cochranae =

Species of frog

Aplastodiscus cochranae is a species of frog in the family Hylidae. It is endemic to the coastal mountains of Santa Catarina, Brazil. The specific name cochranae honors Doris Mable Cochran, an American herpetologist. Common name canebrake treefrog has been coined for this species.

== Description ==
Adult males measure 41–46 mm (1.6–1.8 in) and adult females, based on only two specimens, 45–50 mm (1.8–2.0 in) in snout–vent length. The overall appearance is robust. The snout is rounded, but may be truncated in lateral view. The tympanum is covered by skin but is visible in most specimens. The supra-tympanic fold is well-developed. The fingers have large discs and webbing between fingers II to IV. The toe discs are smaller than those on the fingers; there is basal webbing between the toes II to V. The dorsal coloration is cream-rosy to reddish-brown with scattered melanophores. A black line passes from the nostril along the canthus rostralis to the eye. The lower parts have light pink color, and flanks and joints show violet tones. Males have single subgular vocal sac.

Late-stage tadpoles (Gosner stage 36) are dorsally grayish brown and ventrally grayish. They measure 62–64 mm (2.4–2.5 in) in total length, of which the body makes one third.

== Habitat and conservation ==
Aplastodiscus cochranae live in understorey vegetation of the edge of rainforest at elevations of 500–800 m (1,600–2,600 ft) above sea level. Breeding takes place in small water-filled holes in the ground.

Aplastodiscus cochranae is an abundant species, and the overall population is considered to be stable. The major threat to this species is cattle that trample vegetation and cause water pollution. It occurs in the Serra do Tabuleiro State Park as well as in several private reserves.
