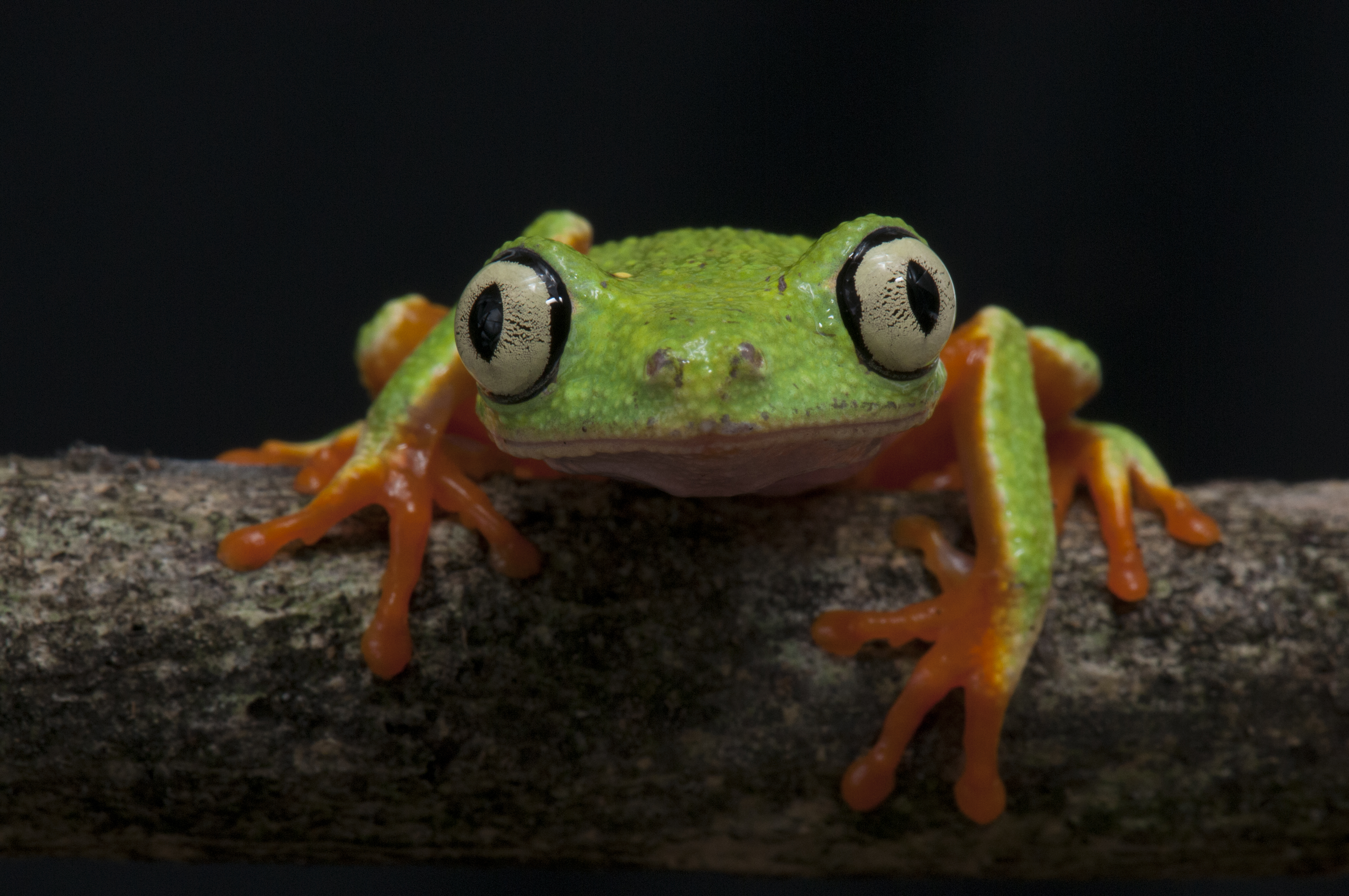

Conservation status
- Least Concern (IUCN 3.1)

Scientific classification
- Kingdom: Animalia
- Phylum: Chordata
- Class: Amphibia
- Order: Anura
- Family: Phyllomedusidae
- Genus: Hylomantis
- Species: H. aspera

Binomial name
- Hylomantis aspera Peters, 1873

Synonyms
- Agalychnis aspera (Faivovich et al., 2010); Hylomantis asperus (Duellman, Marion, & Hedges, 2016); Phyllomedusa aspera (Boulenger, 1882)

= Hylomantis aspera =

Species of frog

Hylomantis aspera or the rough leaf frog is a species of frog in the subfamily Phyllomedusinae. It is endemic to Brazil. It has been seen as high as 600 meters above sea level.

This frog has been observed in forests, near the edges of forests, and in swamps, on leaves and on water plants. The tadpoles develop in temporary puddles.

Scientists do not consider it endangered because of its large range and population.
