= Phasmahyla exilis =

Mottled leaf frog

Conservation status
- Least Concern (IUCN 3.1)

Scientific classification
- Kingdom: Animalia
- Phylum: Chordata
- Class: Amphibia
- Order: Anura
- Family: Phyllomedusidae
- Genus: Phasmahyla
- Species: P. exilis

Binomial name
- Phasmahyla exilis (Cruz, 1980)

Species of amphibian

Phasmahyla exilis, the mottled leaf frog, is a species of frog in the subfamily Phyllomedusinae. It is endemic to Brazil. It has been observed between 200 and 900 meters above sea level.

This frog can change color to camouflage itself using its red and orange spots.

This frog has been observed in primary forest and secondary forest but cannot live in places that are still clear cut. The female frog lays eggs on leaves over streams. When the eggs hatch, the tadpoles fall into the stream below.

Scientists classify this frog as at least risk of extinction because although its habitat is subject to some tree farms and wood harvesting, but is overall not threatened.

Scientists note that this frog can make useful chemicals in its skin.
