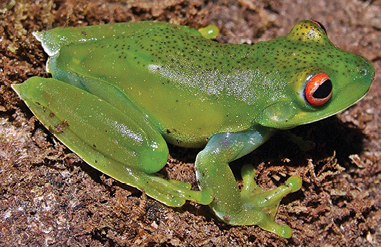

Conservation status
- Least Concern (IUCN 3.1)

Scientific classification
- Kingdom: Animalia
- Phylum: Chordata
- Class: Amphibia
- Order: Anura
- Family: Hylidae
- Genus: Aplastodiscus
- Species: A. ibirapitanga

Binomial name
- Aplastodiscus ibirapitanga (Cruz, Pimenta & Silvano, 2003)

Synonyms
- Hyla ibirapitanga Cruz, Pimenta & Silvano, 2003

= Aplastodiscus ibirapitanga =

Species of frog

Aplastodiscus ibirapitanga is a species of frog in the family Hylidae. Its natural habitats are subtropical or tropical moist lowland forests, subtropical or tropical moist montane forests, and rivers. It tolerates some habitat modification and is not considered threatened.
