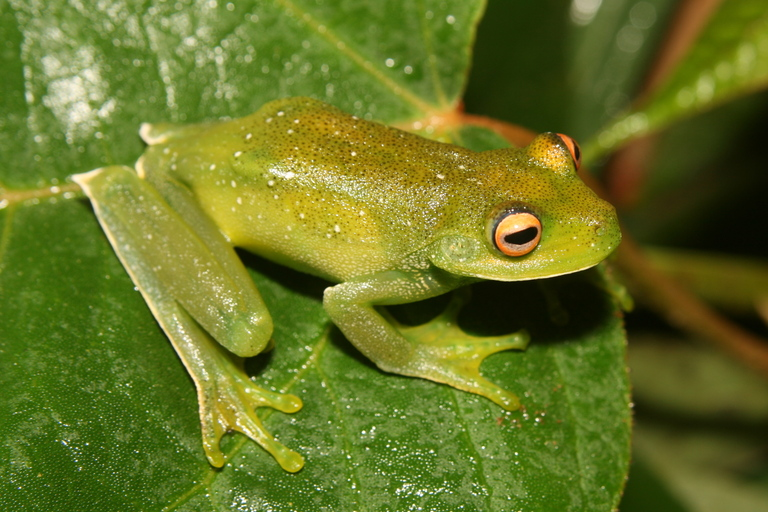
- Aplastodiscus callipygius

Scientific classification
- Kingdom: Animalia
- Phylum: Chordata
- Class: Amphibia
- Order: Anura
- Family: Hylidae
- Tribe: Cophomantini
- Genus: Aplastodiscus; Lutz, 1950

Species
- 16, see text.

= Canebrake tree frogs =

Genus of amphibians

The canebrake tree frogs are a frog genus Aplastodiscus. They are in the family Hylidae. Residing primarily in southeast regions of Brazil near the Atlantic coast. The exception is the Aplastodiscus perviridis which is found mostly in Brazil, but has also been documented being in Argentina, and might reside in Paraguay. The major revision of the Hylidae genus expanded it to include 12 more species originally from Hyla. Before the revision there were only 2 species. There are currently 16 described species with the most recent addition Aplastodiscus heterophonicus being described in 2021.

== Species ==
There are currently 16 described species Aplastodiscus:

- Aplastodiscus albofrenatus (A. Lutz, 1924)
- Aplastodiscus albosignatus (A. Lutz and B. Lutz, 1938)
- Aplastodiscus arildae (Cruz and Peixoto, 1987)
- Aplastodiscus cavicola (Cruz and Peixoto, 1985)
- Aplastodiscus cochranae (Mertens, 1952)
- Aplastodiscus ehrhardti (Müller, 1924)
- Aplastodiscus eugenioi (Carvalho-e-Silva and Carvalho-e-Silva, 2005)
- Aplastodiscus flumineus (Cruz and Peixoto, 1985)
- Aplastodiscus heterophonicus (Pinheiro, Pezzuti, Berneck, Lyra, Lima & Leite, 2021)
- Aplastodiscus ibirapitanga (Cruz, Pimenta, and Silvano, 2003)
- Aplastodiscus leucopygius (Cruz and Peixoto, 1985)
- Aplastodiscus lutzorum (Berneck, Giaretta, Brandao, Cruz & Haddad, 2017)
- Aplastodiscus musicus (B. Lutz, 1949)
- Aplastodiscus perviridis (A. Lutz in B. Lutz, 1950)
- Aplastodiscus sibilatus (Cruz, Pimenta, and Silvano, 2003)
- Aplastodiscus weygoldti (Cruz and Peixoto, 1987)

== Threats ==
Currently none of the species are threatened. Populations of some of the species are declining and the causes include residential and commercial development, human incursions and disturbance, natural systems modifications, agriculture and aquaculture, pollution, biological resource use, and invasive other problematic species, genes and diseases. Many of the species are data deficient, more research is needed to understand the accurate health of their species population.
