= Phasmahyla lisbella =

Conservation status
- Endangered (IUCN 3.1)

Scientific classification
- Kingdom: Animalia
- Phylum: Chordata
- Class: Amphibia
- Order: Anura
- Family: Hylidae
- Genus: Phasmahyla
- Species: P. lisbella

Binomial name
- Phasmahyla lisbella Pereira, Rocha, Folly, Silva, and Santana, 2018

Species of frog

Phasmahyla lisbella is a species of treefrog in the subfamily Phyllomedusinae, endemic to Brazil. Scientists know it only from the type locality: Fazenda Ventania in Área de Protecão Ambiental Ventania. It has been observed between 536 and 1,000 meters above sea level.

The adult male frog measures about 30.4–34.4 mm in snout-vent length. The skin of the dorsum is bright green in color with very small dark brown spots. There is a yellow and brown pattern on its sides with some violet patches. This frog can change color, from bright green during the day to green-brown at night. Scientists consider this camouflage, making the frog harder to see during the day while it is resting.

The male frogs perches on plants hanging over a stream and sing for the female frogs. Like other frogs in Phasmahyla, this frog does not lay eggs in the water. Rather, the female frog folds a leaf into a pocket-shaped nest and deposits her eggs inside it. When the eggs hatch, the tadpoles fall into the water below.

Scientists named this frog after Lis Alves Pereira de Oliveira da Rocha and Bella Alves Pereira Custódio da Rocha.

Scientists believe this frog is endangered because of its small, fragmented range and because its forests are still under threat from agriculture, silviculture, cattle grazing, and urbanization. Scientists also believe the pet trade might pose some threat.
