= Aplastodiscus albofrenatus =

Conservation status
- Least Concern (IUCN 3.1)

Scientific classification
- Kingdom: Animalia
- Phylum: Chordata
- Class: Amphibia
- Order: Anura
- Family: Hylidae
- Genus: Aplastodiscus
- Species: A. albofrenatus

Binomial name
- Aplastodiscus albofrenatus (A. Lutz, 1924)

Species of frog

Aplastodiscus albofrenatus is a species of frog in the family Hylidae, endemic to Brazil. Its natural habitats are subtropical or tropical moist lowland forests, rivers, plantations, rural gardens, and heavily degraded former forests. It is threatened by habitat loss.
