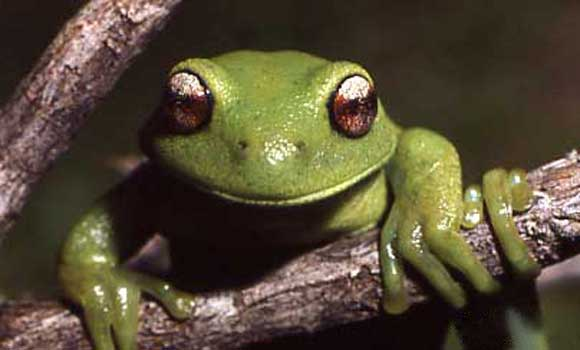

Conservation status
- Least Concern (IUCN 3.1)

Scientific classification
- Kingdom: Animalia
- Phylum: Chordata
- Class: Amphibia
- Order: Anura
- Family: Hylidae
- Genus: Aplastodiscus
- Species: A. perviridis

Binomial name
- Aplastodiscus perviridis A. Lutz, 1950
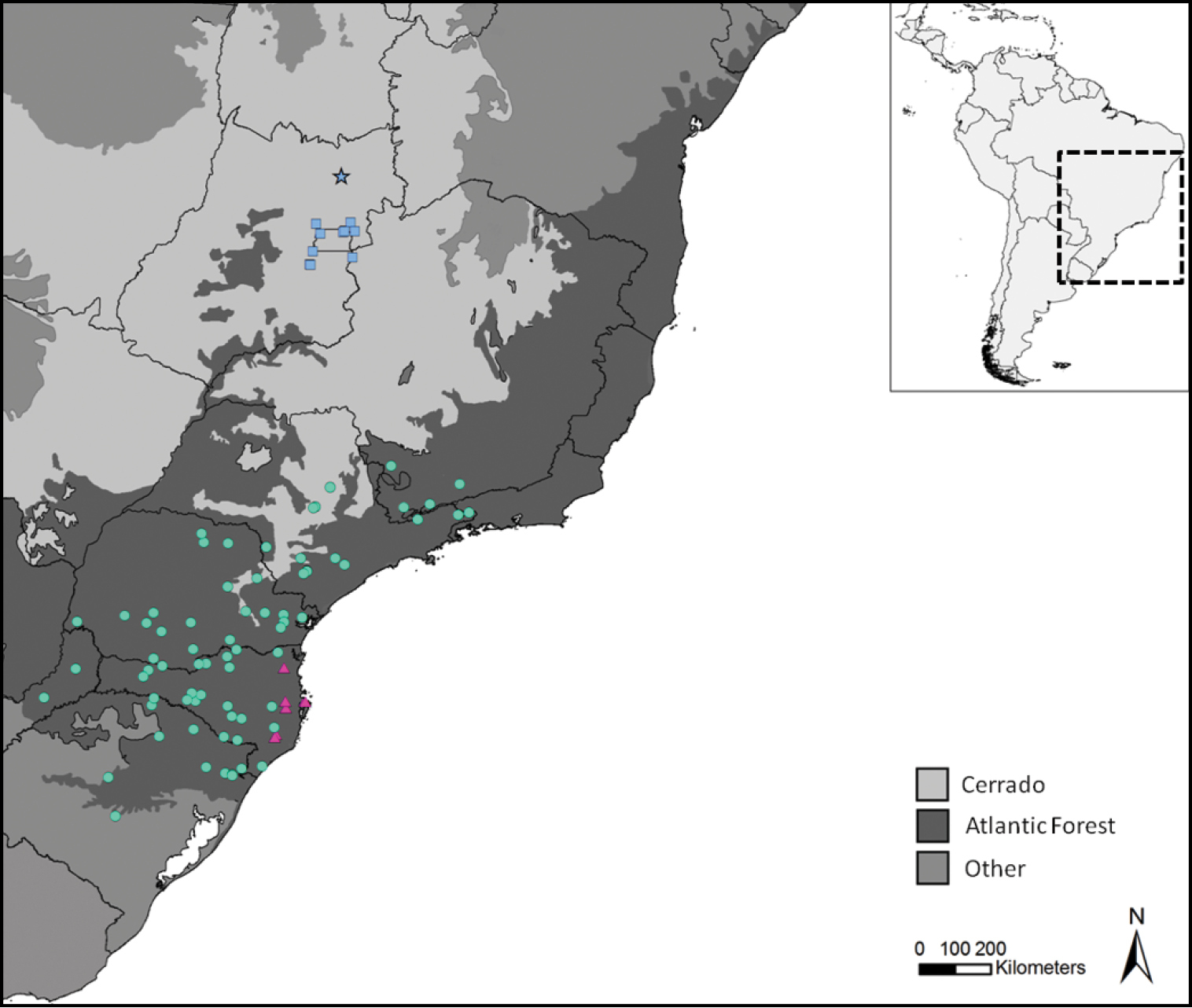
- The species is found in green circles.

= Aplastodiscus perviridis =

Species of frog

Aplastodiscus perviridis is a species of frog in the family Hylidae. It is found in Argentina, Brazil, and possibly Paraguay. Its natural habitats are subtropical or tropical moist lowland forests, subtropical or tropical moist montane forests, subtropical or tropical moist shrublands, subtropical or tropical dry lowland grasslands, rivers, and freshwater marshes.
