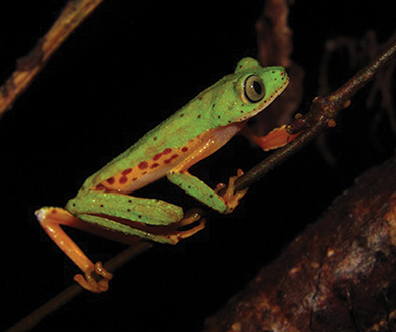
- Phasmahyla timbo

Conservation status
- Least Concern (IUCN 3.1)

Scientific classification
- Kingdom: Animalia
- Phylum: Chordata
- Class: Amphibia
- Order: Anura
- Family: Phyllomedusidae
- Genus: Phasmahyla
- Species: P. timbo

Binomial name
- Phasmahyla timbo (Cruz, Napoli, and Fonseca, 2008)

= Phasmahyla timbo =

Species of frog

Phasmahyla timbo is a species of frog in the subfamily Phyllomedusinae. It is endemic to Brazil. Scientists know it exclusively from Serra do Timbó. People have seen it between 800 and 900 meters above sea level.

Scientists classify this frog as not in danger of extinction because its large range has been subject to little deforestation and because nearby farmers maintain trees suitable for the frogs to provide shade for cacao cabrucas cultivation. This frog lives in open and closed canopy forests. The female frog lays eggs on leaves that grow over water. When the eggs hatch, the tadpoles fall into the water below.

This frog can make useful chemicals in its skin, but scientists do not think anyone is catching the frog to get them.

Some scientists say this is conspecific with Phasmahyla spectabilis.
