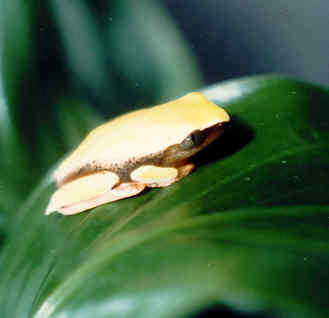
- Phrynomedusa marginata

Scientific classification
- Kingdom: Animalia
- Phylum: Chordata
- Class: Amphibia
- Order: Anura
- Family: Phyllomedusidae
- Genus: Phrynomedusa; Miranda-Ribeiro, 1923

Type species
- Phrynomedusa fimbriata Miranda-Ribeiro, 1923

Species
- 6 species (see text)

= Phrynomedusa =

Genus of amphibians

Phrynomedusa is a genus of tree frogs from the Southeast Region and South Region in Brazil. They were formerly considered to be part of the genus Phyllomedusa, as the "Phyllomedusa fimbriata group". The common names of "colored leaf frog" and "monkey frog" have been used to refer to this type of frog.

== Ecology and conservation ==
Phrynomedusa occur in mountain streams and associated ponds in the Atlantic Forest. Egg clutches are laid outside of the water in rock crevices above the water; the tadpoles develop in the water.

Phrynomedusa are rare and are not well-known. Except for P. appendiculata and P. marginata, they are known from only a few specimens. Only two species are known with certainty to exist in protected areas.

== Description ==
Phrynomedusa are small tree-frogs: adult males measure 26–47 mm (1.0–1.9 in) and females 28–45 mm (1.1–1.8 in) in snout–vent length. The iris is bicolored (a horizontal diffuse dark stripe in middle of eye separating dark yellow in upper and lower surfaces). The dorsum is smooth. Webbing between the fingers and toes is reduced. They lack the flash colors on flanks, preaxial, and postaxial margins of thighs present in the related phyllomedusid genera. Males have vocal sacs and vocal slits.

== Species ==
There are six species, one of them probably extinct:

Binomial name and author	Common name
Phrynomedusa appendiculata (Lutz, 1925)	Santa Catarina leaf frog
Phrynomedusa bokermanni Cruz, 1991	Bokermann's leaf frog
Phrynomedusa dryade Baêta, Giasson, Pombal, and Haddad, 2016
†Phrynomedusa fimbriata Miranda-Ribeiro, 1923	Spiny-knee leaf frog
Phrynomedusa marginata (Izecksohn & Cruz, 1976)	Bicolored leaf frog
Phrynomedusa vanzolinii Cruz, 1991	Vanzolini's leaf frog
