= Phrynomedusa fimbriata =

Conservation status
- Extinct (IUCN 3.1)

Scientific classification
- Kingdom: Animalia
- Phylum: Chordata
- Class: Amphibia
- Order: Anura
- Family: Phyllomedusidae
- Genus: Phrynomedusa
- Species: †P. fimbriata

Binomial name
- †Phrynomedusa fimbriata Miranda-Ribeiro, 1923

Synonyms
- Phyllomedusa fimbriata (Miranda-Ribeiro, 1923)

Extinct species of amphibian

Phrynomedusa fimbriata, the spiny-knee leaf frog, is an extinct species of tree frog. It was endemic to Brazil, where the only known specimen was discovered near Paranapiacaba in the state of São Paulo. The type locality was given as Alto da Serra. While the species might still exist, having only been found once in the 1898, no trace of any individuals have been discovered in successive expeditions.

== Description ==
This species is only known from the holotype, an adult female measuring 46 mm (1.8 in) in snout–vent length. The specimen was collected in 1898 and is now in bad condition with completely faded colors. At the time of species description, the holotype was dorsally pale blue and ventrally reddish yellow.

Phrynomedusa fimbriata is a relatively robust frog for its genus. The snout is acuminate in dorsal view and markedly oblique in lateral view. The tympanum is visible, rounded, and has a visible tympanic annulus. The limbs are slender. The fingers and toes are slender and have reduced webbing and rounded adhesive discs.

== Habitat and conservation ==
The natural history of this species is unknown. Possibly it was a high-altitude stream-breeder. The reason for its disappearance are unknown. The area hosts some protected areas, namely the Serra do Mar State Park and Reserva Biológica do Alto da Serra de Paranapiacaba.
