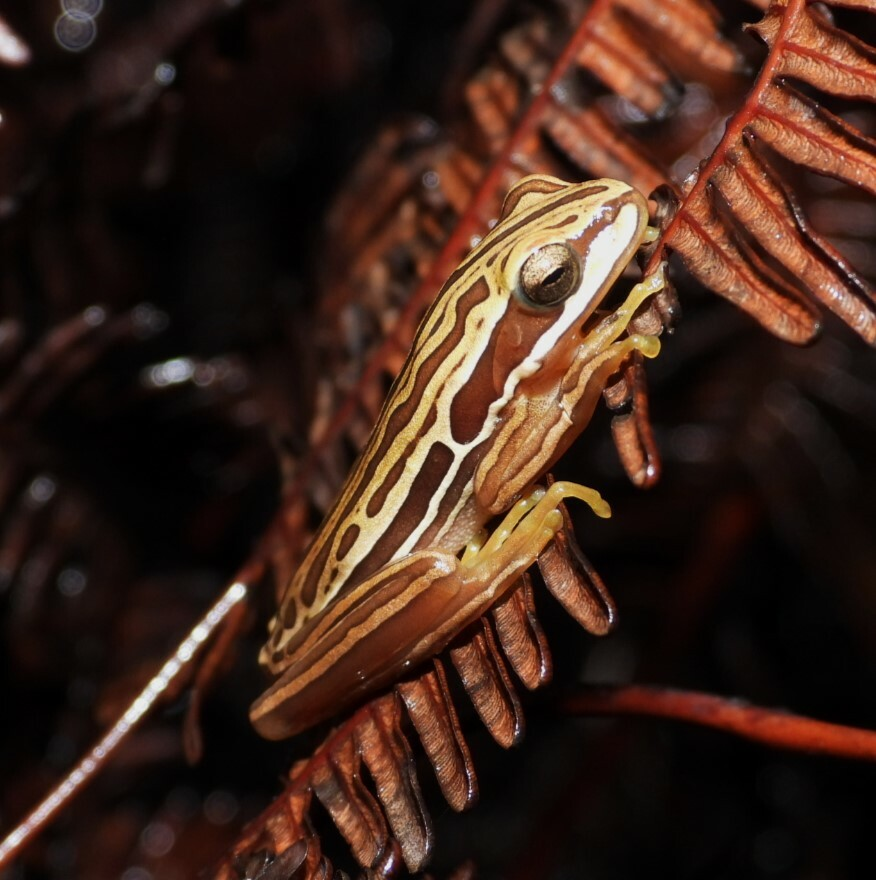

Conservation status
- Endangered (IUCN 3.1)

Scientific classification
- Kingdom: Animalia
- Phylum: Chordata
- Class: Amphibia
- Order: Anura
- Family: Hylidae
- Genus: Boana
- Species: B. buriti

Binomial name
- Boana buriti (Caramaschi & Cruz, 1999)

Synonyms
- Hypsiboas buriti (Caramaschi & Cruz, 1999)

= Boana buriti =

Species of frog

Boana buriti is a species of frog in the family Hylidae endemic to Brazil. Its natural habitats are moist savanna, subtropical or tropical moist shrubland, freshwater marshes, and intermittent freshwater marshes. It is threatened by habitat loss.
