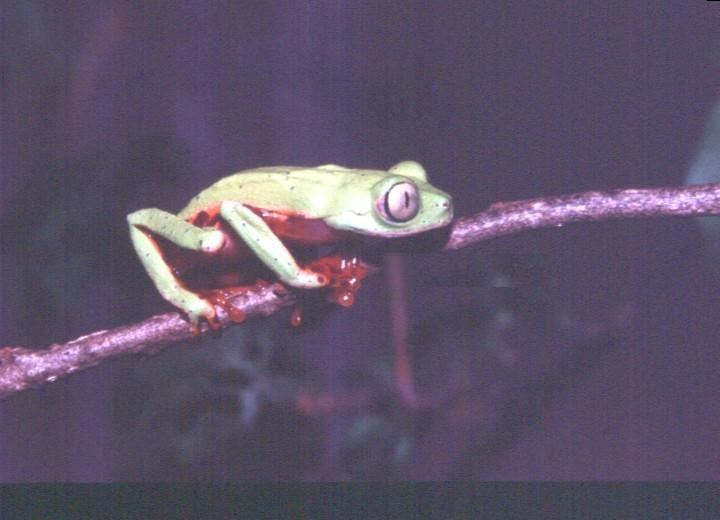
- Phasmahyla cochranae

Scientific classification
- Kingdom: Animalia
- Phylum: Chordata
- Class: Amphibia
- Order: Anura
- Family: Phyllomedusidae
- Genus: Phasmahyla; Cruz, 1991

Species
- See text.

= Phasmahyla =

Shining leaf frogs

Genus of amphibians

Phasmahyla is a genus of tree frogs. They are commonly known as shining leaf frogs, and are endemic to Brazil.

== Species ==
The following species are recognised in the genus Phasmahyla:

Binomial name and Author	Common name
Phasmahyla cochranae (Bokermann, 1966)	Chocolatefoot leaf frog
Phasmahyla cruzi (Carvalho-e-Silva, Silva, and Carvalho-e-Silva, 2009)
Phasmahyla exilis (Cruz, 1980)	Mottled leaf frog
Phasmahyla guttata (Lutz, 1924)	Spotted leaf frog
Phasmahyla jandaia (Bokermann & Sazima, 1978)	Sazima's leaf frog
Phasmahyla lisbella Pereira, Rocha, Folly, Silva, and Santana, 2018
Phasmahyla spectabilis Cruz, Feio & Nascimento, 2008
Phasmahyla timbo Cruz, Napoli & Fonseca, 2008
