= Dendropsophus pseudomeridianus =

Conservation status
- Least Concern (IUCN 3.1)

Scientific classification
- Kingdom: Animalia
- Phylum: Chordata
- Class: Amphibia
- Order: Anura
- Family: Hylidae
- Genus: Dendropsophus
- Species: D. pseudomeridianus

Binomial name
- Dendropsophus pseudomeridianus (Caramaschi, Cruz & Dias, 2000)

Synonyms
- Hyla pseudomeridiana Cruz, Caramaschi, and Dias, 2000

Species of frog

Dendropsophus pseudomeridianus is a species of frog in the family Hylidae. It is endemic to Brazil. Its natural habitats are moist savanna, subtropical or tropical seasonally wet or flooded lowland grassland, freshwater marshes, intermittent freshwater marshes, arable land, pastureland, plantations, rural gardens, heavily degraded former forest, ponds, and canals and ditches.
