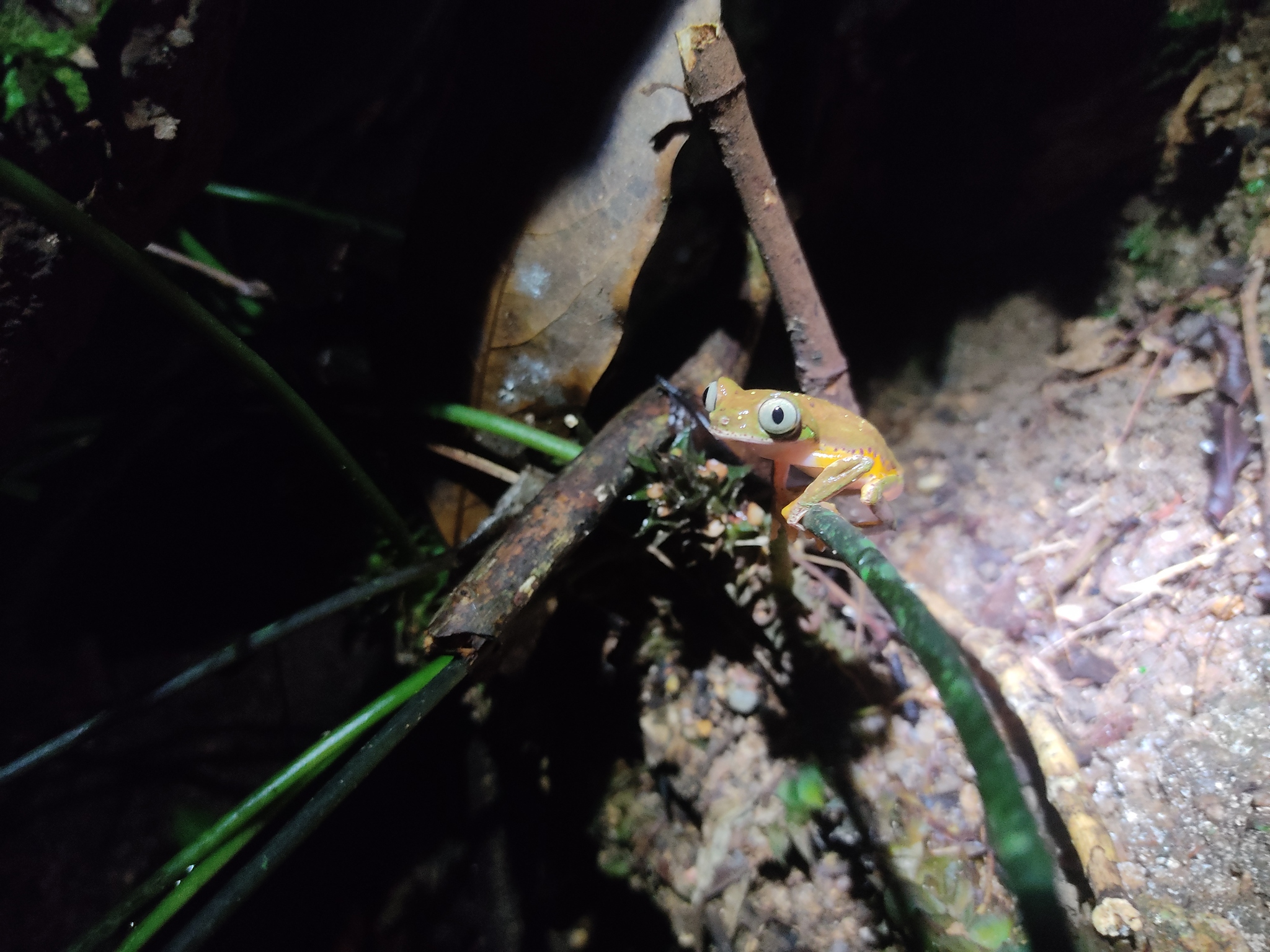

Conservation status
- Least Concern (IUCN 3.1)

Scientific classification
- Kingdom: Animalia
- Phylum: Chordata
- Class: Amphibia
- Order: Anura
- Family: Phyllomedusidae
- Genus: Phasmahyla
- Species: P. guttata

Binomial name
- Phasmahyla guttata (A. Lutz, 1925)

= Phasmahyla guttata =

Spotted leaf frog

Species of amphibian

Phasmahyla guttata, the spotted leaf frog, is a species of frog in the subfamily Phyllomedusinae. It is endemic to Brazil. It lives in forests and near the edges of forests but not outside forests. It has been observed between 50 and 1200 meters above sea level.

Phasmahyla guttata uses camouflage coloring that ranges from brown to green. This use of coloring is known as polyphenism.

Their females typically lay 42± 19 eggs. The female frog lays eggs on leaves over streams. When the eggs hatch, the tadpoles fall into the stream below.

Scientists classify this frog as least concern of extinction because although its habitat has historically been subject to deforestation, it is not in danger now.

Scientists note that this frog can produce a variety of useful chemicals in its skin.
