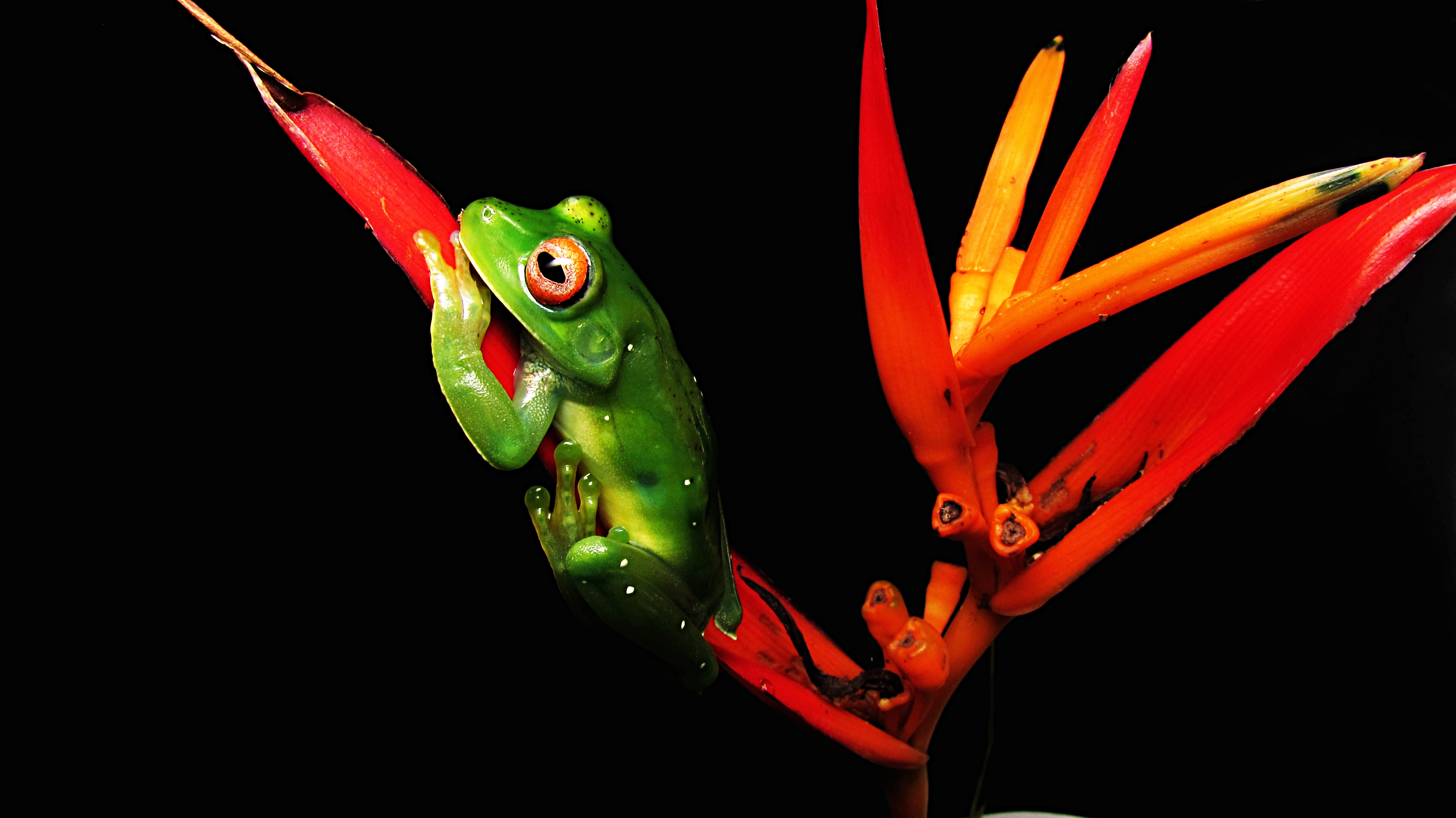

Conservation status
- Least Concern (IUCN 3.1)

Scientific classification
- Kingdom: Animalia
- Phylum: Chordata
- Class: Amphibia
- Order: Anura
- Family: Hylidae
- Genus: Aplastodiscus
- Species: A. cavicola

Binomial name
- Aplastodiscus cavicola (Cruz & Peixoto, 1984)

= Aplastodiscus cavicola =

Species of frog

Aplastodiscus cavicola, or Cruz's treefrog, is a species of frog in the family Hylidae. It is endemic to Brazil. Its natural habitats are subtropical or tropical moist lowland forests and rivers. It is threatened by habitat loss.
