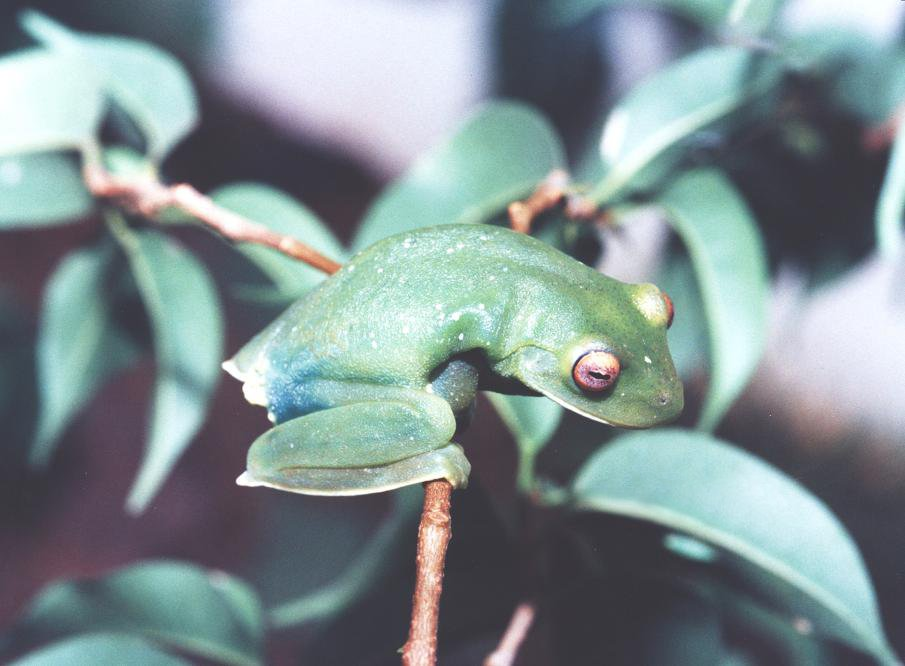

Conservation status
- Least Concern (IUCN 3.1)

Scientific classification
- Kingdom: Animalia
- Phylum: Chordata
- Class: Amphibia
- Order: Anura
- Family: Hylidae
- Genus: Aplastodiscus
- Species: A. leucopygius

Binomial name
- Aplastodiscus leucopygius (Cruz & Oswaldo Luiz Peixoto, 1985)

= Aplastodiscus leucopygius =

Species of frog

Aplastodiscus leucopygius is a species of frog in the family Hylidae. It is endemic to Brazil.

== Description ==
A. leucopygius is a medium-sized frog growing to a length of about 4 cm (1.6 in). The snout is rounded, and a single vocal sac is on the throat. The iris is golden, tinged with orange around the edge, and the tympanum is clearly visible. The fingers and toes have large discs on the tips to help the frog retain grip when climbing. The dorsal surface of this frog is smooth and green, with a scattering of white spots, while the ventral surface is granular and cream-coloured with white flecks. The skin above the vent is ornamented by a short, white ridge.

== Distribution ==
A. leucopygius is an arboreal species and is endemic to the mountains near the south-eastern coast of Brazil at altitudes of 800 to 1,600 metres (2,600 to 5,200 ft) above sea level. It is mainly found in forested areas near streams or temporary pools.

== Reproduction ==
Breeding takes place in the rainy season between December and February. The male calls from trees close to a body of water to attract a female. Often, several males near each other form a chorus. On the arrival, a female selects a male in an elaborate courtship ritual. This ends with the inspection by the female of an underground nesting chamber already prepared in a wet, muddy place by the male. If this is approved, mating takes place, and a raft of eggs is laid inside it. The developing tadpoles remain in the nest until washed out by flooding, after which they continue their development in shallow streams.

== Status ==
A. leucopygius is listed as being of Least Concern in the IUCN Red List of Threatened Species. It is a common species within its wide range and the population seems stable.
