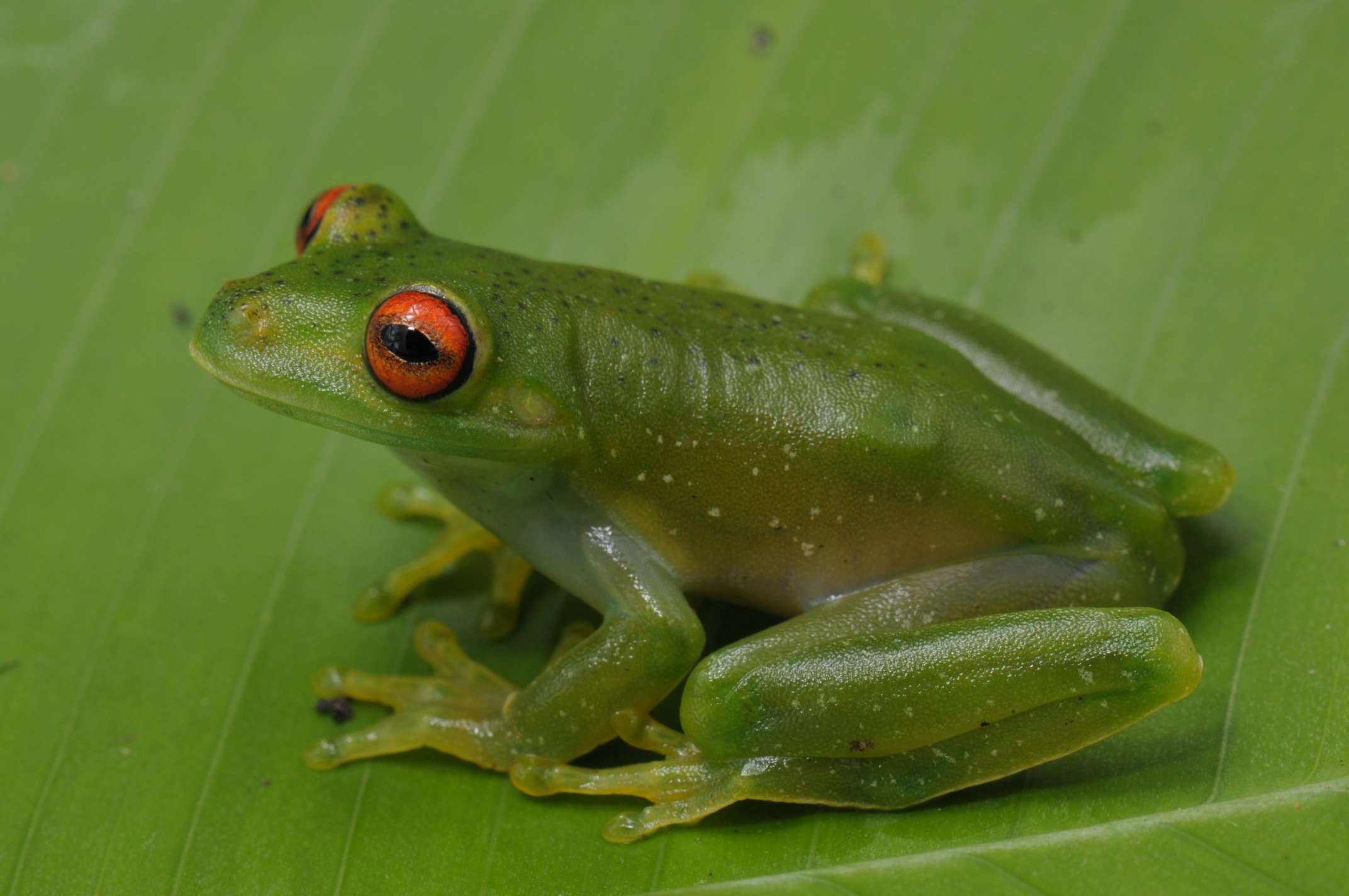

Conservation status
- Least Concern (IUCN 3.1)

Scientific classification
- Kingdom: Animalia
- Phylum: Chordata
- Class: Amphibia
- Order: Anura
- Family: Hylidae
- Genus: Aplastodiscus
- Species: A. sibilatus

Binomial name
- Aplastodiscus sibilatus (Cruz, Pimenta, and Silvano, 2003)

Synonyms
- Hyla sibilata Cruz, Pimenta, and Silvano, 2003

= Aplastodiscus sibilatus =

Species of frog

Aplastodiscus sibilatus is a species of frog in the family Hylidae. It is endemic to northeastern Brazil and is known from central-eastern Bahia to Alagoas. The specific name sibilatus is derived from the Latin sibilus meaning "whistle", in allusion to the characteristic call of the species.

== Description ==
Adult males measure 30–34 mm (1.2–1.3 in) in snout–vent length. The overall appearance is slender. The head is slightly longer than it is wide. The snout is obtuse in lateral view and slightly tapering in dorsal view. The tympanum is distinct, but its upper edge is covered by the well-developed supratympanic fold. The fingers and the toes bear adhesive discs at their tips and have well-developed webbing. Dorsal surfaces are green with numerous black dots and few white dots posteriorly, without forming a clear pattern. The gular region and chest are bluish-green. The belly is white.

== Habitat and conservation ==
Aplastodiscus sibilatus occurs in coastal Restinga forest and primary Atlantic forest at elevations of about 20–720 m (66–2,362 ft) above sea level. Males call from bromeliads and shrubs. Breeding takes place in both slow/ and fast-flowing streams. This species is locally threatened by habitat loss caused by agricultural development, logging, and infrastructure development. A large part of its range is at least partially protected.
