= Aplastodiscus musicus =

Conservation status
- Critically Endangered (IUCN 3.1)

Scientific classification
- Kingdom: Animalia
- Phylum: Chordata
- Class: Amphibia
- Order: Anura
- Family: Hylidae
- Genus: Aplastodiscus
- Species: A. musicus

Binomial name
- Aplastodiscus musicus (B. Lutz, 1948)

Species of frog

Aplastodiscus musicus is a species of frog in the family Hylidae. It is endemic to Brazil. Its natural habitats are subtropical or tropical moist montane forests and rivers. It is threatened by habitat loss.
