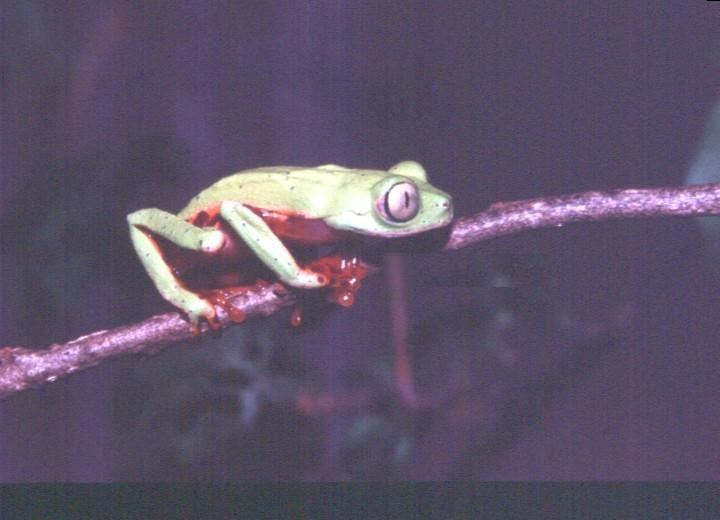

Conservation status
- Least Concern (IUCN 3.1)

Scientific classification
- Kingdom: Animalia
- Phylum: Chordata
- Class: Amphibia
- Order: Anura
- Family: Phyllomedusidae
- Genus: Phasmahyla
- Species: P. cochranae

Binomial name
- Phasmahyla cochranae (Bokermann, 1966)

= Phasmahyla cochranae =

Chocolatefoot leaf frog

Species of amphibian

Phasmahyla cochranae, sometimes called the chocolatefoot leaf frog, is a species of frog in the subfamily Phyllomedusinae. It is endemic to Brazil. People have seen it between 800 and 1600 meters above sea level.

== Appearance ==
The adult male frog measures 28 to 37 mm in snout-vent length and the adult female frog 41 to 46 mm. It has vertical pupils in its eyes and no webbed skin on its forefeet. This frog can change color, showing green or brick brown. It has orange, purple, or brown spots on its sides.

== Habitat and ecology ==
This frog lives in vegetation near the edges of streams in forests. Scientists have only found small groups, no more than three frogs singing together. The female frog lays eggs in folded leaf nests hanging above streams. The eggs are cream-white. Clutches number about 32. When the eggs hatch, the tadpoles fall into the stream, where they develop for about five months, feeding at the surface of the water.

Many of places within this frog's range are protected parks, for example Parque Estadual Nova Baden and Parque Municipal do Itapetinga. However, it still suffers from increased ultraviolet radiation and habitat fragmentation. Human beings cut down the forests for agriculture, tree farms, livestock grazing, and urban expansion.

== Etymology ==
The specific name cochranae honours Doris Mable Cochran, an American herpetologist.
