= Phrynomedusa dryade =

Scientific classification
- Kingdom: Animalia
- Phylum: Chordata
- Class: Amphibia
- Order: Anura
- Family: Phyllomedusidae
- Genus: Phrynomedusa
- Species: P. dryade

Binomial name
- Phrynomedusa dryade Baêta, Giasson, Pombal, and Haddad, 2016

Species of amphibian

Phrynomedusa dryade, the monkey frog, is a species of frog in the family Hylidae, endemic to Brazil. Scientists have only seen it in five places, always in ponds or mountain streams.

The adult male frog measures 28.4 to 31.7 mm in snout-vent length and the adult female frog 36.1 mm. Its nostrils are almost as far apart as its eyes, which are very large. Each eyeball is almost as wide as the distance between the eyes.

This frog has thin front legs and robust hind legs. It is green in color with clear white lines. Parts of its toes and legs are bright orange.

The female frog lays eggs in rows near cracks in rocks near the water. The tadpoles swim upright in the water, with their tails facing down.

Scientists believe this frog to be threatened by habitat loss and that its range may once have been much wider. This frog may have been killed in certain areas by the chytrid fungus Batrachochytrium dendrobatidis.

== Original publication ==
- Baêta, Délio; Giasson, Luís Olímpio Menta; Pombal, José P.; Haddad, Célio Fernando Baptista (December 1, 2016). "Review of the rare genus Phrynomedusa Miranda-Ribeiro, 1923 (Anura: Phyllomedusidae) with description of a new species". Herpetological Monographs (Abstract). 30 (1): 49–78. doi:10.1655/HERPMONOGRAPHS-D-15-00009.1. ISSN 0733-1347. S2CID 52238516.
