= Glandirana tientaiensis =

Conservation status
- Least Concern (IUCN 3.1)

Scientific classification
- Kingdom: Animalia
- Phylum: Chordata
- Class: Amphibia
- Order: Anura
- Family: Ranidae
- Genus: Glandirana
- Species: G. tientaiensis

Binomial name
- Glandirana tientaiensis (Chang, 1933)

Synonyms
- Rana tientaiensis Boring and Chang, 1933 – nomen nudum; Rana tientaiensis Chang, 1933; Rugosa tientaiensis (Chang, 1933)

Species of amphibian

Glandirana tientaiensis, also known as Tiantai frog and Tientai rough-skinned frog, is a species of frog in the family Ranidae. Its name refers to its type locality, Tiantai. It is endemic to eastern China and is only known from Zhejiang and south-eastern Anhui provinces.

Male G. tientaiensis measure 44 mm (1.7 in) and female 51 mm (2.0 in) in length. Their natural habitats are open, low-gradient large streams and small rivers at elevations of 100–700 m (330–2,300 ft) above sea level. They sometimes also occur in still-water pools close to streams. This uncommon species is threatened by habitat loss.
