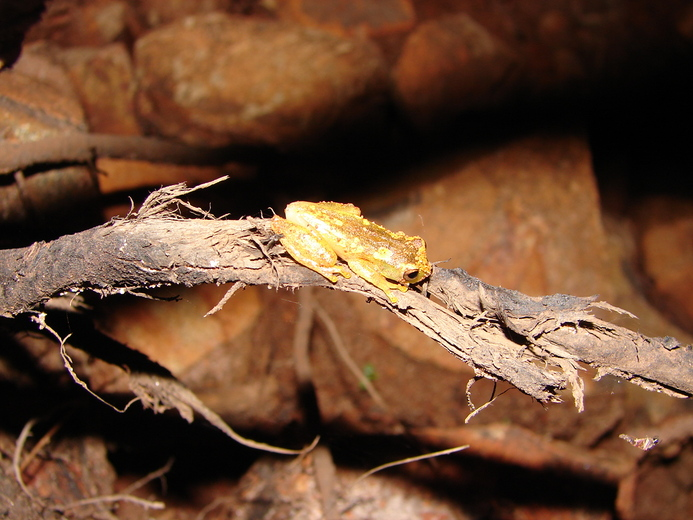

Conservation status
- Least Concern (IUCN 3.1)

Scientific classification
- Kingdom: Animalia
- Phylum: Chordata
- Class: Amphibia
- Order: Anura
- Family: Hylidae
- Genus: Dendropsophus
- Species: D. cruzi

Binomial name
- Dendropsophus cruzi (Pombal & Bastos, 1998)

= Dendropsophus cruzi =

Species of amphibian

Dendropsophus cruzi is a species of frogs in the family Hylidae.

== Habitat ==
Endemic to Brazil, its natural habitats are dry savanna, moist savanna, swamps, freshwater marshes, and intermittent freshwater marshes. It also inhabits pastureland, rural gardens, ponds, and canals and ditches.

== Threats ==
The frog is threatened by habitat loss.
