= Phrynomedusa appendiculata =

Conservation status
- Critically Endangered (IUCN 3.1)

Scientific classification
- Kingdom: Animalia
- Phylum: Chordata
- Class: Amphibia
- Order: Anura
- Family: Phyllomedusidae
- Genus: Phrynomedusa
- Species: P. appendiculata

Binomial name
- Phrynomedusa appendiculata (Lutz, 1925)

Species of amphibian

Phrynomedusa appendiculata, the Santa Catarina leaf frog, is a species of frog in the subfamily Phyllomedusinae. It is endemic to Brazil, where it is only known from the southern Atlantic Forest.

This frog is classified as critically endangered on the IUCN Red List. It is thought to be a very rare and declining species. After 1970, no further sightings of the species were made until late 2011, when it was rediscovered near Santo André in the state of São Paulo, marking the first observation of the species in over 41 years; these results were published in a 2022 study. The factors for its initial disappearance remain unclear, although it may have to do with chytridiomycosis and habitat loss associated with agriculture and coal mining, including air pollution.

The Santo André site is over 250 kilometers away from its type locality near São Bento do Sul in Santa Catarina, and despite immense growth in citizen science efforts over the following decade, the species has not been recorded at any other sites aside from Santo André. This may be due to the Santo André site having a more pristine habitat optimal for P. appendiculata, but it may also be due to P. appendiculata being more difficult to record and thus being overlooked at other sites.

This arboreal frog requires healthy rainforest where the tree branches form a canopy. The frog was found on vegetation near water. The female frog lays her eggs on leaves over water such that the tadpoles fall into the water when they hatch. Scientists have seen the frogs laying eggs in blackwater ponds and oxbow lakes.

Scientists speculate that fewer than fifty individuals may be alive now, though they note that the northern part of its former range, which includes the protected Parque Estadual Nascentes do Paranapanema, remains suitable habitat. There is some concern that, if rediscovered, this frog may be affected by the illegal pet trade, collectors tempted by its colors and rarity. Scientists note that other frogs in Phrynomedusa are sold as pets, both legally and otherwise.
