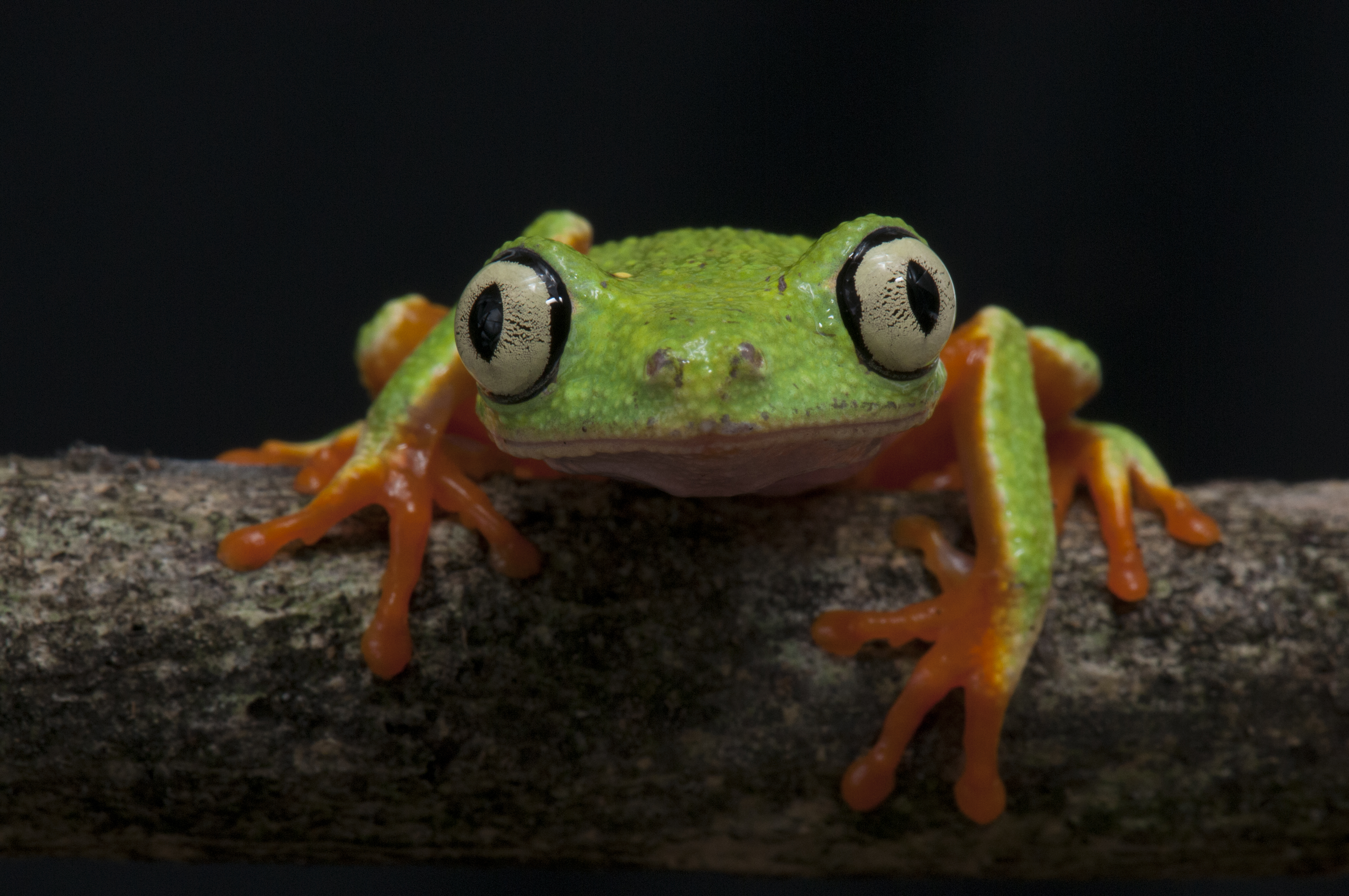
- Hylomantis aspera

Scientific classification
- Domain: Eukaryota
- Kingdom: Animalia
- Phylum: Chordata
- Class: Amphibia
- Order: Anura
- Family: Hylidae
- Subfamily: Phyllomedusinae
- Genus: Hylomantis; Peters, 1873

Species
- See text.

= Hylomantis =

Rough leaf frogs

Genus of amphibians

Hylomantis is a genus of tree frogs, the rough leaf frogs, native to the Atlantic forest in eastern Brazil. There are two recognized species; several others formerly placed in this genus now are placed in Agalychnis.

== Species ==
Binomial name and Author	Common name
Hylomantis aspera Peters, 1873	Rough leaf frog
Hylomantis granulosa (Cruz, 1989)	Granular leaf frog
