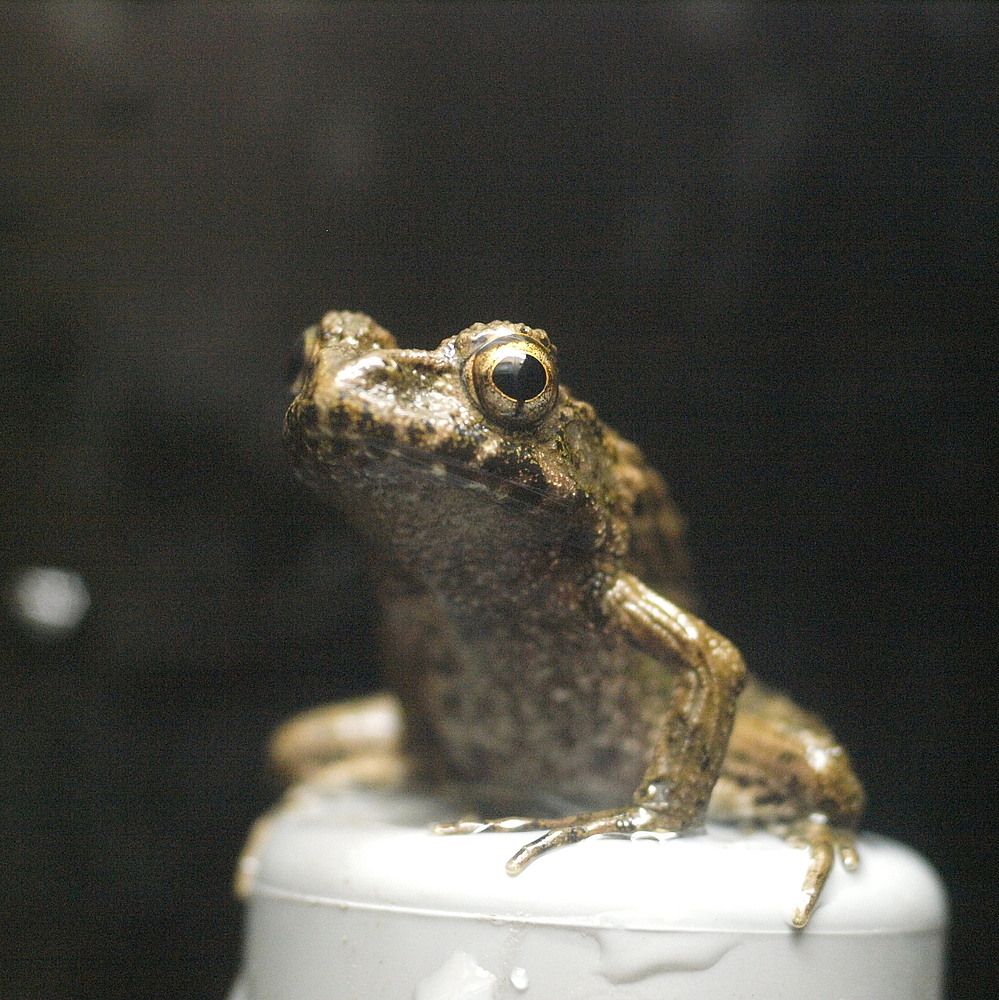
- Japanese wrinkled frog

Conservation status
- Least Concern (IUCN 3.1)

Scientific classification
- Kingdom: Animalia
- Phylum: Chordata
- Class: Amphibia
- Order: Anura
- Family: Ranidae
- Genus: Glandirana
- Species: G. rugosa

Binomial name
- Glandirana rugosa (Temminck and Schlegel, 1838)

Synonyms
- Rana rugosa Temminck and Schlegel, 1838

= Japanese wrinkled frog =

Species of amphibian

The Japanese wrinkled frog (Glandirana rugosa) is a species of true frog native to Japan and introduced to Hawaii in the late 19th century. It has sometimes been regarded as a single species with the Imienpo Station frog (Glandirana emeljanovi) which is found on the East Asian mainland. The two species are distinguished from others by their rough and uneven skin. It lives and breeds in various freshwater environments, including ponds, streams and wetlands. The IUCN does not consider this species to be faced by any significant threats.

Populations of G. rugosa are of particular scientific interest because they display both male (XX/XY) and female (ZZ/ZW) heterogamety in different parts of Japan. This coexistence of two sex-determination systems within a single species makes the frog an important model for understanding the evolution and turnover of sex chromosomes in vertebrates. Genetic and cytogenetic studies have shown that its sex chromosomes, derived from the same ancestral pair, have undergone multiple independent differentiation and "recycling" events through recombination and hybridization.

Phylogeographic analyses have revealed deep genetic divisions between eastern and western populations, suggesting potential cryptic speciation within what is currently recognized as G. rugosa. The species remains common across most of Japan, particularly in rice paddies and small freshwater systems, and continues to be listed as Least Concern on the IUCN Red List.
