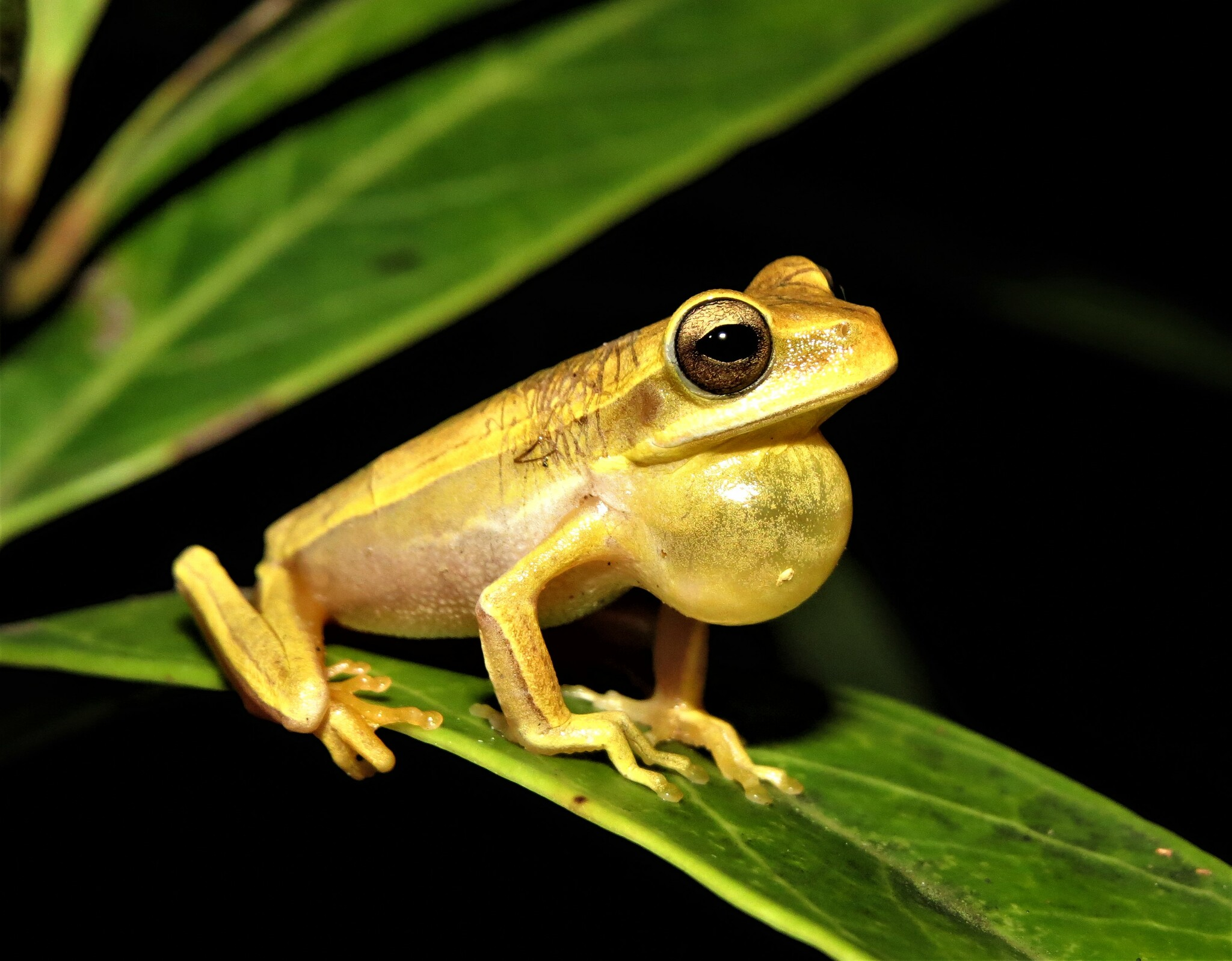

Conservation status
- Least Concern (IUCN 3.1)

Scientific classification
- Kingdom: Animalia
- Phylum: Chordata
- Class: Amphibia
- Order: Anura
- Family: Hylidae
- Genus: Boana
- Species: B. goiana

Binomial name
- Boana goiana (B. Lutz, 1968)

Synonyms
- Hyla polytaenia ssp. goiana (Lutz, 1968); Hypsiboas goianus (Lutz, 1968); Boana phaeopleura (Caramaschi & Cruz, 2000)

= Boana goiana =

Species of frog

Boana goiana is a species of frog in the family Hylidae that is endemic to Brazil. Its natural habitats are moist savanna, subtropical or tropical moist shrubland, subtropical or tropical high-altitude shrubland, and rivers. It is threatened by habitat loss, though is still currently of least concern as its conservation status.

A 2021 phylogenetic analysis identified Boana phaeopleura as a synonym of this species.
