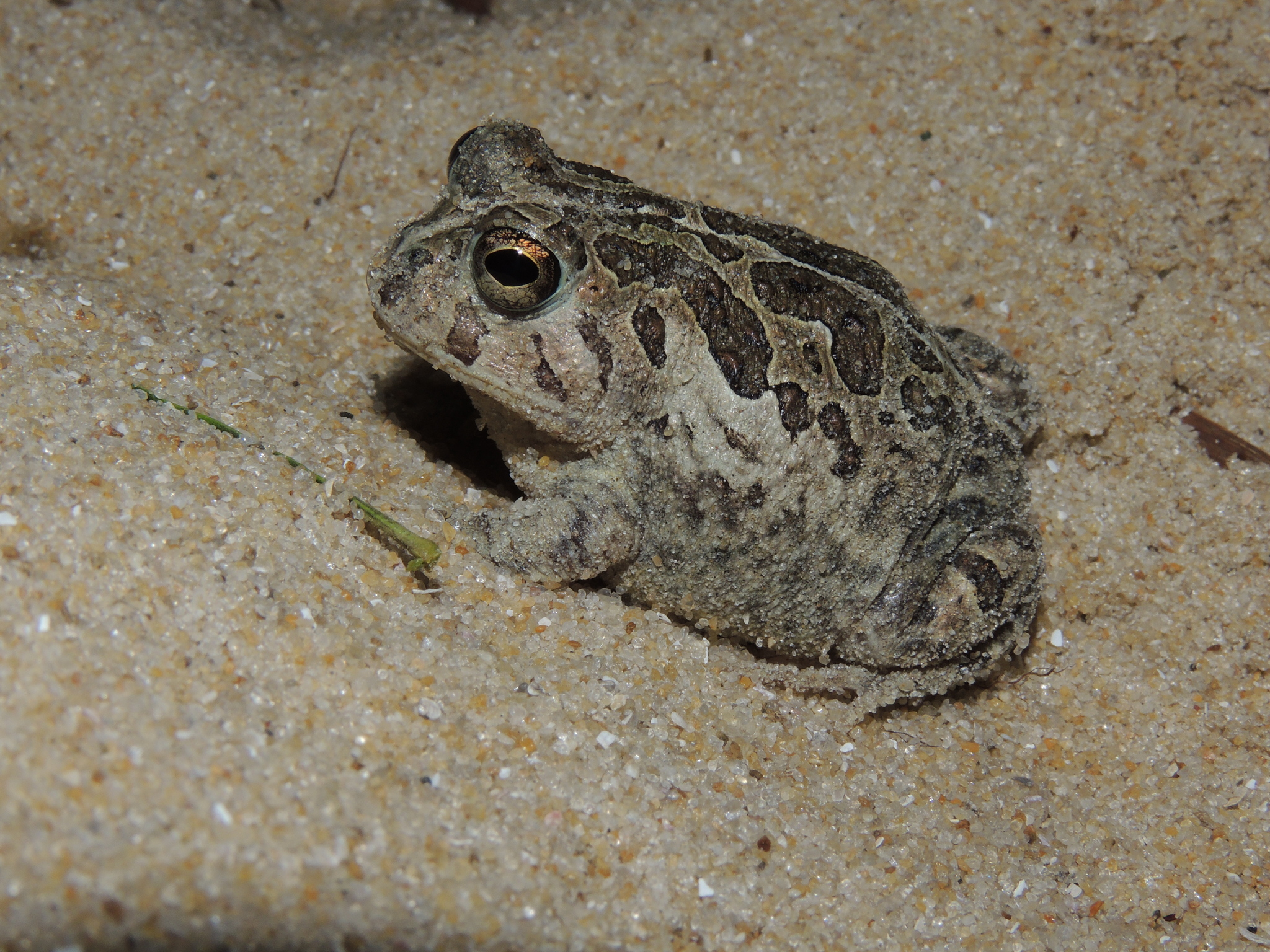

Conservation status
- Least Concern (IUCN 3.1)

Scientific classification
- Kingdom: Animalia
- Phylum: Chordata
- Class: Amphibia
- Order: Anura
- Family: Odontophrynidae
- Genus: Odontophrynus
- Species: O. maisuma

Binomial name
- Odontophrynus maisuma Rosset, 2008

= Odontophrynus maisuma =

Species of frog

Odontophrynus maisuma is a species of frog in the family Odontophrynidae. It is found in coastal areas of Uruguay and Southern Brazil, between Montevideo and Florianópolis. This diploid species is very similar to Odontophrynus cordobae, which is also diploid, and Odontophrynus americanus, which is tetraploid.

== Habitat ==
It inhabits sandy environments of coastal regions at sea level. Scientists have reported it in many protected parks in Uruguay and Brazil: Parque Nacional Cabo Polonio, Area de manejo de habitats y/o especies Cerro Verde e Islas de la Coronilla, Paisaje Protegido Laguna de Rocha, Área de Proteção Ambiental da Baleia Franca, Estação Ecológica do Taim, Parque Estadual Itapeva, and Parque Nacional da Lagoa do Peixe.

== Reproduction ==
The female frog lays eggs in the mud on the bottoms of ponds. This frog's tadpoles develop in ponds.

== Threats ==
The IUCN classifies this species as least concern and the government of Uruguay as near threatened. Its principal threats are habitat loss from urbanization and tourism at its coastal habitat. Scientists also found the fungus Batrachochytrium dendrobatidis on tadpoles at Laguna de Rocha, but they do not know the degree of threat posed by the chytridiomycosis disease.

== Original description ==
- Rosset SD (2008). "New species of Odontophrynus Reinhardt and Leutken 1862 (Anura: Neobatrachia) from Brazil and Uruguay". J Herpetol. 42: 134–144.
