= Proceratophrys melanopogon =

Conservation status
- Least Concern (IUCN 3.1)

Scientific classification
- Kingdom: Animalia
- Phylum: Chordata
- Class: Amphibia
- Order: Anura
- Family: Odontophrynidae
- Genus: Proceratophrys
- Species: P. melanopogon

Binomial name
- Proceratophrys melanopogon (Miranda-Ribeiro, 1926)

Synonyms
- Stombus melanopogon Miranda-Ribeiro, 1926

Species of frog

Proceratophrys melanopogon is a species of frog in the family Odontophrynidae. It is endemic to Serra do Mar in Rio de Janeiro and São Paulo states, Brazil.

== Description ==
Proceratophrys melanopogon grows to a snout-to-vent length of 36 to 50 mm (1.4 to 2.0 in) for males and 41 to 62 mm (1.6 to 2.4 in) for females. It has a rounded snout and the fingers are unwebbed and have swollen tips. The skin on the back is smooth or has small warty tubercles and on the side has glandular warts. There is a distinctive ridge running from above the eye to the pelvis. The colour is some shade of brown and there are several irregular dark blotches.

== Distribution and habitat ==
Proceratophrys melanopogon is endemic to the states of São Paulo and Rio de Janeiro in southeastern Brazil. Records from Minas Gerais probably refer to Proceratophrys mantiqueira. It is found in forests, living among the leaf litter and breeding in small streams. Its altitudinal range is 800 to 1,480 metres (2,620 to 4,860 ft) above sea level.

== Breeding ==
Proceratophrys melanopogon is an explosive breeder. After heavy rain has fallen creating temporary pools and streamlets, large numbers of male frogs gather together and call to attract females. The call is a multipulsed series of notes with a frequency of about 1179 Hz and is heard between 6pm and midnight. The tadpoles develop in slow-moving streams. They have wide stripes on the caudal musculature.

== Status ==
Ongoing threats to Proceratophrys melanopogon include habitat loss and fragmentation due to centuries of human exploitation of its forests through logging and land conversion in favor of agriculture, sericulture, urbanization, and livestock cultivation. However, much of its remaining habitat is within national parks or in otherwise protected areas. This frog is quite common and though its numbers may be decreasing, they are not doing so at a fast enough rate as to make the species threatened, and the IUCN lists it as being of "least concern".
