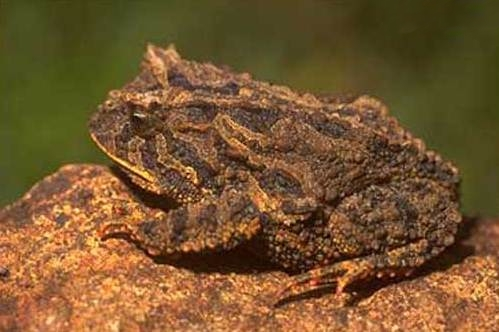

Conservation status
- Least Concern (IUCN 3.1)

Scientific classification
- Kingdom: Animalia
- Phylum: Chordata
- Class: Amphibia
- Order: Anura
- Family: Odontophrynidae
- Genus: Proceratophrys
- Species: P. brauni

Binomial name
- Proceratophrys brauni Kwet and Faivovich, 2001

= Proceratophrys brauni =

Species of frog

Proceratophrys brauni is a species of frog in the family Odontophrynidae. It is endemic to South Brazil and has been recorded in the Paraná, Santa Catarina, and Rio Grande do Sul states. The specific name brauni honors Pedro Canisio Braun, a Brazilian herpetologist. The common name horn toad has been coined for this species.

== Description ==
Adult males measure 30–35 mm (1.2–1.4 in) and adult females 39–40 mm (1.5–1.6 in) in snout–vent length. The body is robust and stout. The snout is short but has a pointed tip in dorsal view. The eyes are large. The tympanum is scarcely visible. The arms and the legs short and robust; the toes are slightly webbed. The upper eyelids have usually three distinct protuberant tubercles. Dorsal skin is granular and warty, bearing variably arranged and sized tubercles and ridges. Two distinct longitudinal rows of tubercles extend from behind the upper eyelids over the dorsum to the vent, forming two curved ridges. Dorsal coloration is variable and consists of various shades of brown, tan, or gray, forming a regular pattern of longitudinally arranged dark and light brown markings. The lower surfaces are predominantly black but have a variable distinct pattern of bright red or orange-red blotches and spots on chest and venter. Proceratophrys brauni females are significantly larger than males. Finger length, tip of snout, and tubercles on eyelids are characteristics that vary slightly from a male and female.

== Habitat and reproduction ==
Proceratophrys brauni occurs in subtropical rainforests at 300–1,100 m (980–3,610 ft) above sea level. Outside the breeding season, it is terrestrial and occurs in the leaf-litter. Breeding takes place in small streams in conjunction with heavy rains, and the eggs may be deposited under stones of stream beds.

Scientists have seen this frog in many protected parks, for example Área de Proteção Ambiental da Escarpa Devoniana in Campos Gerais, Área de Proteção Ambiental Rota do Sol, Parque Estadual de Santa Clara, Parque Estadual de Vila Velha, Parque Estadual Rio Canoas, Parque Nacional de São Joaquim, and Refúgio da Vida Silvestre dos Campos de Palmas.

== Conservation and threats ==
It is a common species that occurs in several protected areas. The IUCN does not consider this species to be under any serious threat. In some places, it faces a minor threat in the form of habitat loss associated with urbanization, agriculture, and the setting of fires to create livestock grazing areas.
