= Proceratophrys moehringi =

Conservation status
- Least Concern (IUCN 3.1)

Scientific classification
- Kingdom: Animalia
- Phylum: Chordata
- Class: Amphibia
- Order: Anura
- Family: Odontophrynidae
- Genus: Proceratophrys
- Species: P. moehringi

Binomial name
- Proceratophrys moehringi Weygoldt & Peixoto, 1985

Species of frog

Proceratophrys moehringi is a species of frog in the family Odontophrynidae. It is endemic to Brazil.

== Habitat ==
This frog lives next to streams in primary and secondary forest. Scientists observed the frog between 100 and 800 meters above sea level.

The frog's range includes some protected areas: Estação Biológica de Santa Lucia, Parque Estadual do Forno Grande, and Reserva Biológica Augusto Ruschi.

== Threats ==
The IUCN classifies this frog as least concern of extinction. Its range was once heavily logged in favor of timber harvesting, agriculture, and animal grazing, but there are large amounts of forest remaining in Serra do Castelo, with minimal continued exploitation.
