= Proceratophrys strussmannae =

Conservation status
- Least Concern (IUCN 3.1)

Scientific classification
- Kingdom: Animalia
- Phylum: Chordata
- Class: Amphibia
- Order: Anura
- Family: Odontophrynidae
- Genus: Proceratophrys
- Species: P. strussmannae

Binomial name
- Proceratophrys strussmannae Ávila, Kawashita-Ribeiro, and Morais, 2011

Species of frog

Proceratophrys strussmannae is a species of frog in the family Odontophrynidae. It is endemic to Brazil.

== Description ==
The adult male frog measures 41.1–47.3 mm in snout-vent length and the adult female frog 52.7–59.8 mm.

== Habitat ==
Scientists observed this frog areas where forests transition to other types of habitats, such as pature, and at least one urban area. The frogs seem to utilize the leaf litter microhabitat, but not exclusively. Scientists observed the frog between 200 and 300 meters above sea level.

== Threats ==
The IUCN classifies this species as least concern. The principal threats are habitat loss, particularly deforestation, in favor of cattle grazing and soybean monoculture. However, because this only takes place in some parts of the frog's range, it is not in danger of extinction.
