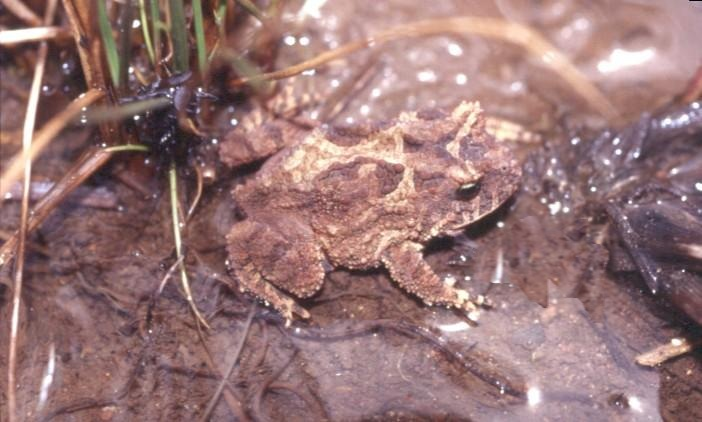

Conservation status
- Least Concern (IUCN 3.1)

Scientific classification
- Kingdom: Animalia
- Phylum: Chordata
- Class: Amphibia
- Order: Anura
- Family: Odontophrynidae
- Genus: Proceratophrys
- Species: P. avelinoi

Binomial name
- Proceratophrys avelinoi Mercadal del Barrio & Barrio, 1993

= Proceratophrys avelinoi =

Species of frog

Proceratophrys avelinoi is a species of frog in the family Odontophrynidae. It is found in Argentina, Brazil, and possibly Paraguay.

== Habitat ==
This frog has been found in small patches of forest near streams and occasionally in pastures. Scientists found the frog between 150 and 1200 meters above sea level.

This frog's range includes protected areas: Reserva Natural Carapa, Reserva Natural Limoy, and Refugio Biológico Binacional de Mbaracaju. These places are not the same as other protected places. People still engage in farming and forestry there.

== Threats ==
The IUCN classifies this frog as least concern of extinction. Principal threats include habitat loss associated with logging, agriculture, and livestock grazing.
