= Proceratophrys minuta =

Conservation status
- Least Concern (IUCN 3.1)

Scientific classification
- Kingdom: Animalia
- Phylum: Chordata
- Class: Amphibia
- Order: Anura
- Family: Odontophrynidae
- Genus: Proceratophrys
- Species: P. minuta

Binomial name
- Proceratophrys minuta Napoli, Cruz, Abreu, and Del Grande, 2011

Species of frog

Proceratophrys minuta is a species of frog in the family Odontophrynidae. It is endemic to Brazil.

== Description ==
The adult male frog measures 20.4–25.2 mm in snout-vent length and the adult female frog 28.3–31.9 mm. This frog has pointlike structures over its eyes.

== Habitat ==
Scientists saw this frog in gallery forest. Sometimes the frogs were in the leaf litter, but not always. Scientists observed the frog between 800 and 840 meters above sea level.

The frog's known range overlaps two protected areas: Parque Natural Municipal da Macaqueiras and Parque Estadual das Sete Passagens.

== Reproduction ==
The tadpoles grow in the streams.

== Threats ==
The IUCN classifies this frog as least concern. What threat it faces comes from habitat loss associated with mining and conversion of forest to farmland and cattle grazing areas. However, because most of the frog's range is high in the mountains where the ground is steep, these threats are localized.
