= Hypostomus auroguttatus =

Conservation status
- Least Concern (IUCN 3.1)

Scientific classification
- Kingdom: Animalia
- Phylum: Chordata
- Class: Actinopterygii
- Division: Teleostei
- Order: Siluriformes
- Family: Loricariidae
- Genus: Hypostomus
- Species: H. auroguttatus

Binomial name
- Hypostomus auroguttatus Kner, 1854

Species of catfish

Hypostomus auroguttatus is a species of freshwater ray-finned fish belonging to the family Loricariidae, the suckermouth armored catfishes, and the subfamily Hypostominae, the suckermouth catfishes. This catfish is endemic to Brazil, where it is found in the Paraíba do Sul river basin, the Paraná River basin, and the middle and lower São Francisco River basin, with records from the Preto River and Jacutinga River. This species occurs in large rapids with rocky substrates. The species reaches a total length of 34 cm (13 in) and is believed to be a facultative air-breather. It is reportedly possible that the name Hypostomus auroguttatus is a senior synonym of Hypostomus luetkeni, due to supposed confusion involving type localities, meaning that a new name may be necessary for H. auroguttatus auctorum multorum.
