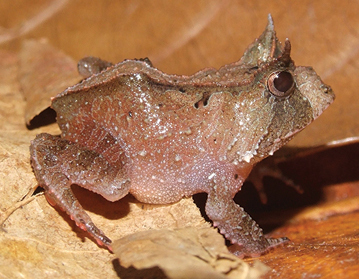

Conservation status
- Least Concern (IUCN 3.1)

Scientific classification
- Kingdom: Animalia
- Phylum: Chordata
- Class: Amphibia
- Order: Anura
- Family: Odontophrynidae
- Genus: Proceratophrys
- Species: P. renalis

Binomial name
- Proceratophrys renalis (Miranda-Ribeiro, 1920)

Synonyms
- Ceratophrys renalis Miranda-Ribeiro, 1920; Stombus renalis (Miranda-Ribeiro, 1920)

= Proceratophrys renalis =

Species of frog

Proceratophrys renalis is a species of frog in the family Odontophrynidae. It is endemic to Brazil.

== Habitat ==
This frog lives in Atlantic forests, both seasonal and in gallery forests. Its range overlaps with many protected parks.

== Relationship to humans ==
This frog is seen in the international pet trade.

== Reproduction ==
The adult male frog calls from the leaf litter. The tadpoles develop streams with rocky, sandy bottoms.

== Conservation and threats ==
The IUCN classifies this frog as least concern of extinction. The principal threats are habitat loss associated with urbanization, agriculture, cattle grazing, sericulture, and other uses.

== Original description ==
- Prado GM; Pombal Jr., JP (2008). "Especies de Proceratophrys Miranda-Ribeiro, 1920 com apendices palpebrais (Anura; Cycloramphidae)". Arq. Zool. 39: 1–85.
