= Proceratophrys huntingtoni =

Conservation status
- Vulnerable (IUCN 3.1)

Scientific classification
- Kingdom: Animalia
- Phylum: Chordata
- Class: Amphibia
- Order: Anura
- Family: Odontophrynidae
- Genus: Proceratophrys
- Species: P. huntingtoni

Binomial name
- Proceratophrys huntingtoni Ávila, Pansonato, and Strüssmann, 2012

Species of frog

Proceratophrys huntingtoni is a frog in the family Odontophrynidae. It is endemic to Brazil.

== Description ==
The adult male frog measures 31.75–38.67 mm in snout-vent length and the adult female frog 33.04–45.69 mm.

== Etymology ==
Scientists named the frog for American naturalist Herbert Huntington.

== Habitat ==
Scientists saw this frog in gallery forest and streamside vegetation in Cerrado biomes between 250 and 750 meters above sea level. This frog is nocturnal.

The frog's range overlaps with Parque Nacional Da Chapada Dos Guimarães, but scientists have not reported the frog within the park.

== Reproduction ==
This frog has young in streams that are only wet for part of the year. The male frog sits next to the stream and calls to the female frogs. The tadpoles swim in the streams.

== Threats ==
The IUCN classifies this frog as vulnerable to extinction. The principal threats are climate change, which could alter the rains that create the temporary streams that the frog needs to breed, and habitat loss in favor of urbanization, agriculture, and livestock grazing.
