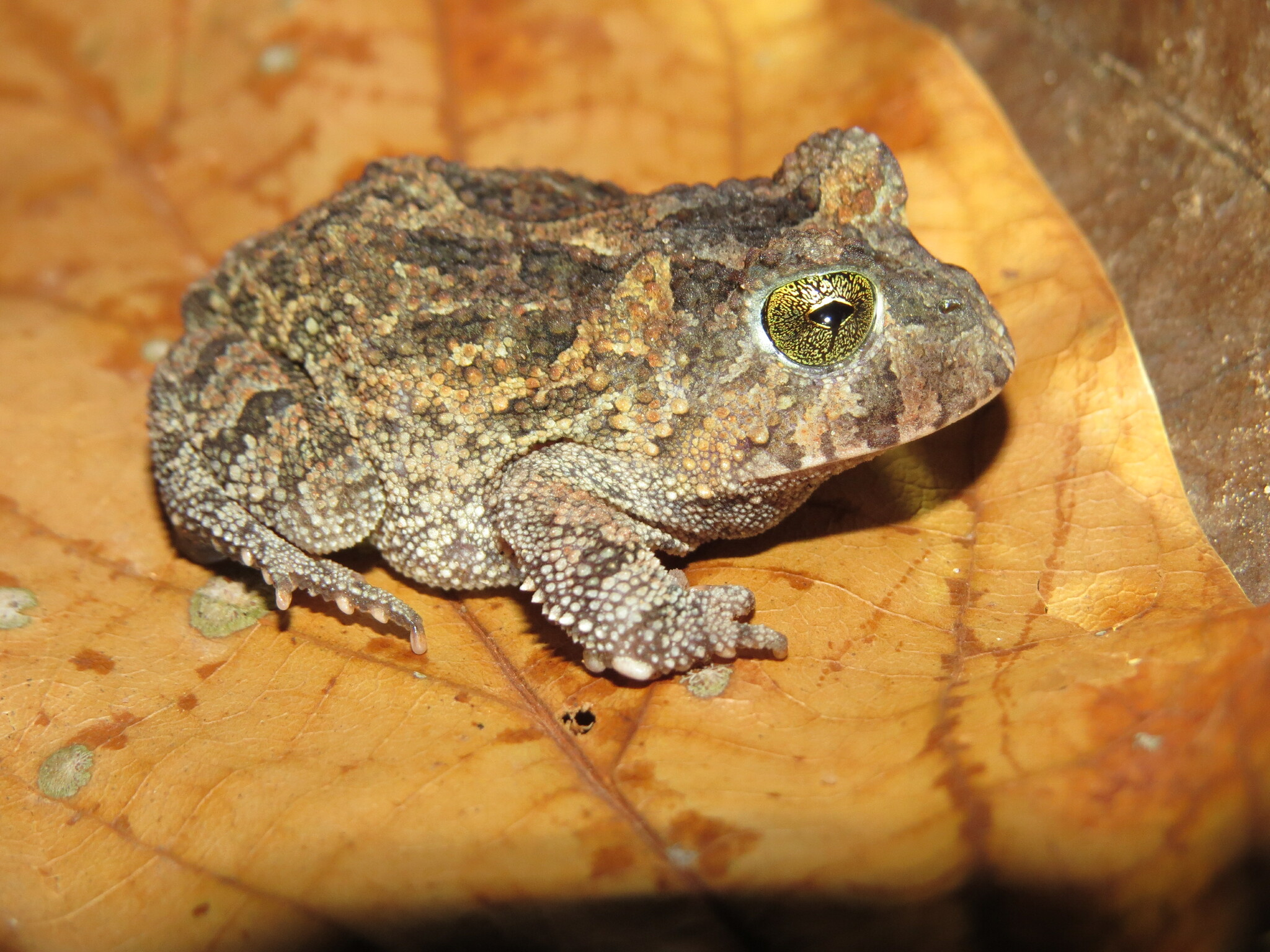

Conservation status
- Least Concern (IUCN 3.1)

Scientific classification
- Kingdom: Animalia
- Phylum: Chordata
- Class: Amphibia
- Order: Anura
- Family: Odontophrynidae
- Genus: Proceratophrys
- Species: P. branti

Binomial name
- Proceratophrys branti Dias, Amaro, Carvahlo-e-Silva, and Rodrigues, 2013

= Proceratophrys branti =

Species of frog

Proceratophrys branti is a species of frog in the family Odontophrynidae. It is endemic to Brazil.

== Habitat ==
This frog has been found in Cerrado biomes between 250 and 1340 meters above sea level.

Scientists have seen reported frog in many protected parks, for example Área de Proteção Ambiental Jalapão, Área de Proteção Ambiental Pouso Alto, Área de Proteção Ambiental Serra do Lajeado, Estação Ecológica Serra Geral do Tocantins, Parque Estadual do Jalapão, and Parque Estadual do Lajeado.

== Reproduction ==
The male frog calls to the female frogs at night. Scientists infer that the tadpoles swim in small streams.

== Threats ==
The IUCN classifies this frog as least concern of extinction and cites no specific threats.

== Original description ==
- Brandao RA; Caramaschi U; Vaz-Silva W; Campos LA (2013). "Three new species of Proceratophrys Miranda-Ribeiro 1920 from Brzilian Cerrado (Anura, Odontophrynidae)". Zootaxa. 3750: 321–347.
