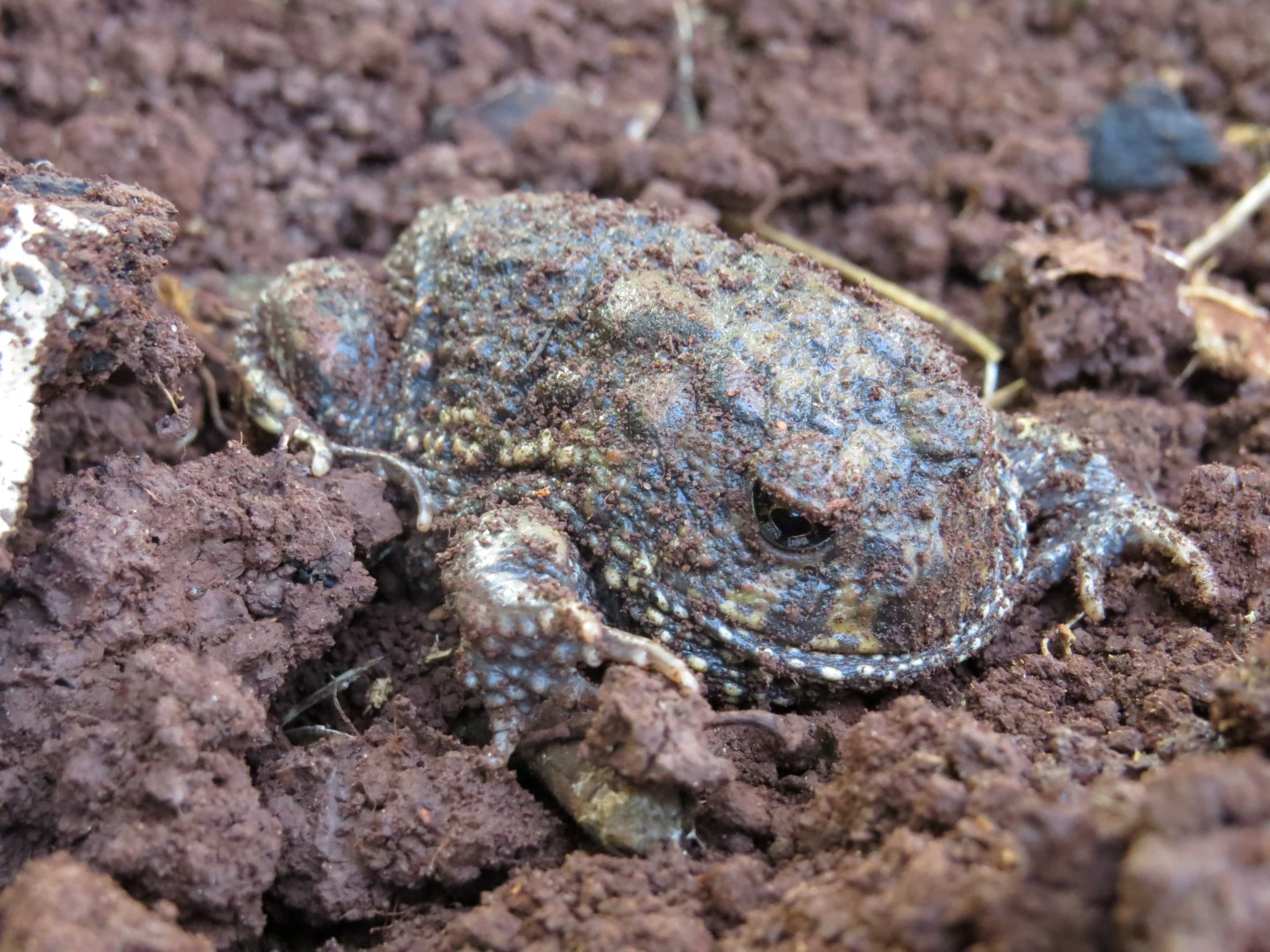

Conservation status
- Least Concern (IUCN 3.1)

Scientific classification
- Kingdom: Animalia
- Phylum: Chordata
- Class: Amphibia
- Order: Anura
- Family: Odontophrynidae
- Genus: Odontophrynus
- Species: O. carvalhoi

Binomial name
- Odontophrynus carvalhoi Savage and Cei, 1965

= Odontophrynus carvalhoi =

Species of frog

Odontophrynus carvalhoi (common name: Carvalho's escuerzo) is a species of frog in the family Odontophrynidae. It is endemic to eastern Brazil and found east of the Espinhaço Mountains between northern Minas Gerais and Paraíba at altitudes higher than 500 m (1,600 ft) above sea level.

== Description ==
Males measure 51.6–69.4 mm (2.03–2.73 in) and females 53.3–76.5 mm (2.10–3.01 in) in snout–vent length. The snout is vertical in profile. The parotoid glands are large and elongated to elliptical in shape. Dorsal ground colour is greyish green. There is a blackish to greyish green Y-shaped mark that runs from each upper eyelid to near the sacral region.

The male advertisement call is composed of a single, multi-pulsed note.

== Habitat and conservation ==
Odontophrynus carvalhoiis found adjacent to deciduous or semi-deciduous forest areas in Caatinga, Atlantic Forest, and Cerrado biomes. It has been characterized as a dry forest border inhabitant of northeastern Brazil. It has shown reasonably good tolerance to habitat disturbance.

Scientists have reported the frog in many protected parks: Área de Preservação Ambiental Aldeia-Beberibe, Área de Preservação Ambiental da Serra de Baturite, Área de Preservação Ambiental de Murici, Área de Preservação Ambiental do Rio Pandeiros, Parque Estadual das Sete Passagens, Parque Nacional da Chapada da Diamantina, Parque Nacional da Serra da Canastra, Parque Nacional de Ubajara, Parque Nacional do Catimbau, and Reserva Biológica de Serra Negra.

== Reproduction ==
Breeding is explosive, and the tadpoles develop in small intermittent streams and temporary ponds.

== Threats ==
The IUCN classifies this species as least concern of extinction. It could be impacted by habitat loss caused by livestock grazing and fire.
