= Odontophrynus monachus =

Conservation status
- Least Concern (IUCN 3.1)

Scientific classification
- Kingdom: Animalia
- Phylum: Chordata
- Class: Amphibia
- Order: Anura
- Family: Odontophrynidae
- Genus: Odontophrynus
- Species: O. monachus

Binomial name
- Odontophrynus monachus Caramaschi and Napoli, 2012

Species of amphibian

Odontophrynus monachus is a species of frogs in the family Odontophrynidae. It is endemic to southeastern Brazil and only known from its type locality in the Serra da Canastra National Park (southwestern Minas Gerais state), in the headwaters of the São Francisco River, at around 1,350 m (4,430 ft) above sea level. The specific name monachus, derived from the Latin word for "monk", alludes to the type locality in the headwaters of the São Francisco River (="St. Francis River") and Francis of Assisi, known as a patron of the animals and of the environment.

== Description ==
Males measure 40.6–54.1 mm (1.60–2.13 in) and females (based on a single specimen) about 55.5 mm (2.19 in) in snout–vent length. The snout is obtuse in profile. The parotoid glands are globose and pearl-shaped in shape. The dorsum is granulose. Dorsal ground colour (in preservative) is brown or olive-brown. There is a cream coloured inter-orbital bar.

The males have vocal sac and start calling at dusk. The advertisement call is composed of one to three multi-pulsed notes.

== Habitat ==
Odontophrynus monachus has been collected from an area with many grass-covered swamps on dark, clayish soil, with small, slow rivulets and pools. These frogs were found near shallow temporary pools or on the border of pools formed in the rain drainage beds. The climate in the area is tropical and humid.

== Reproduction ==
This frog is an explosive breeder. The tadpoles swim in temporary pools in shallow, rocky streams where the water moves slowly. The tadpoles are benthic.
