= Proceratophrys izecksohni =

Conservation status
- Least Concern (IUCN 3.1)

Scientific classification
- Kingdom: Animalia
- Phylum: Chordata
- Class: Amphibia
- Order: Anura
- Family: Odontophrynidae
- Genus: Proceratophrys
- Species: P. izecksohni

Binomial name
- Proceratophrys izecksohni Dias, Amaro, Carvahlo-e-Silva, and Rodrigues, 2013

Species of frog

Proceratophrys izecksohni is a species of frog in the family Odontophrynidae. It is endemic to Brazil.

== Description ==
The adult male frog measures 32.1–54.2 mm in snout-vent length. It has light brown pigmentation in the gular area and a cream-white ventrum with brown dots.

== Habitat ==
This frog is an obligate forest resident. It has been observed in the leaf litter in both primary and secondary forest. Scientists have found the frog between 0 and 200 meters above sea level.

Scientists have reported the frog in Reserva Particular do Patrimônio Natural Rio das Pedras. They think it may also live in Parque Natural Municipal Da Mata Atlântica and Parque Estadual do Cunhambebe.

== Reproduction ==
The female frog deposits eggs in deep streams with rocky bottoms. The tadpoles are free swimming and benthic.

== Threats ==
The IUCN classifies this frog as least concern. What threat it faces comes from habitat loss in favor of urbanization, agriculture, and livestock cultivation.
