= Odontophrynus juquinha =

Conservation status
- Least Concern (IUCN 3.1)

Scientific classification
- Kingdom: Animalia
- Phylum: Chordata
- Class: Amphibia
- Order: Anura
- Family: Odontophrynidae
- Genus: Odontophrynus
- Species: O. juquinha

Binomial name
- Odontophrynus juquinha Rocha, Sena, Pezzuti, Leite, Svartman, Rosset, Baldo, and Garcia, 2017

Species of frog

Odontophrynus juquinha is a species of frog. It is endemic to Brazil.

== Habitat ==
This frog is known from grassy biomes. Scientists saw the frog between 900 and 1540 meters above sea level.

Scientists have reported the frog in several protected parks: Área de Preservação Ambiental Morro da Pedreira, Área de Preservação Ambiental Serra do Barbado, Parque Estadual Serra do Intendente, Parque Estadual da Serra do Cabral, Parque Estadual de Serra Nova, and Parque Nacional da Serra do Cipó.

== Reproduction ==
This frog usually reproduces after a heavy rains. The male frog sits with his body in the water of a temporary pond with his head partially exposed and calls to the female frogs. The tadpoles are benthic and live in streams, swamps, and temporary ponds.

== Threats ==
The IUCN classifies this frog as least concern. What threat it faces comes from habitat loss associated with open mining, urbanization, tourism, and forest conversion to tree farms, such as pine and eucalyptus.

== Original description ==
- Rocha PC; Sena LMFde; Pezzuti TL; Leite FSF; Svartman M; Rosset SD; Baldo D; Garcia PCdeA (2017). "A new diploid species belonging to the Odontophrynus americanus species group (Anura: Odontophrynidae) from the Espinhaco range, Brazil". Zootaxa. 4329: 327–350.
