= P. palustris =

P. palustris may refer to:

- Pandanus palustris, a plant species in the family Pandanaceae, endemic to Mauritius and threatened by habitat loss
- Parnassia palustris, a plant species and the county flower of Cumberland and Sutherland in the United Kingdom
- Pedicularis palustris, the marsh lousewort, a plant species in the genus Pedicularis
- Pinus palustris, the longleaf pine, a pine species native to the southeastern United States
- Poa palustris, the fowl bluegrass, fowl meadowgrass, swamp meadowgrass or woodland bluegrass, a grass species native to Asia, Europe and Northern America
- Poecile palustris, a passerine bird in the tit family native to Europe and Asia
- Proceratophrys palustris, a frog species in the family Leptodactylidae, endemic to Brazil

== Synonyms ==
- Potentilla palustris, a synonym for Comarum palustre, the purple marshlocks, swamp cinquefoil or marsh cinquefoil, a common waterside shrub species occurring throughout North America, Europe and Asia
