= Proceratophrys cururu =

Conservation status
- Vulnerable (IUCN 3.1)

Scientific classification
- Kingdom: Animalia
- Phylum: Chordata
- Class: Amphibia
- Order: Anura
- Family: Odontophrynidae
- Genus: Proceratophrys
- Species: P. cururu

Binomial name
- Proceratophrys cururu Eterovick & Sazima, 1998

Species of frog

Proceratophrys cururu is a species of frog in the family Odontophrynidae. It is endemic to Brazil.

== Habitat ==
This frog is nocturnal and largely terrestrial, hiding in tufts of grass during the day. The frog lives in savanna, gallery forests, and shrubland in Cerrado biomes. Scientists observed the frog between 800 and 1300 meters above sea level.

The frog has been found in some protected places: Parque Nacional Das Sempre Vivas, Parque Estadual do Rio Preto, Parque Estadual da Serra do Intendente, and Parque Nacional da Serra do Cipó.

== Reproduction ==
The male frog hides in rocks and calls to the female frogs. The male frogs can be territorial. The female frog places her eggs on the bottom of the stream. The tadpoles are diurnal and benthic and live where the water moves slowly. The tadpoles have been seen from November to April.

== Threats ==
The IUCN classifies this frog as vulnerable to extinction. Its principal threats are habitat loss in favor of urbanization, agriculture, and livestock grazing. There is also subsistence-level wood collection.
