= Proceratophrys rotundipalpebra =

Conservation status
- Near Threatened (IUCN 3.1)

Scientific classification
- Kingdom: Animalia
- Phylum: Chordata
- Class: Amphibia
- Order: Anura
- Family: Odontophrynidae
- Genus: Proceratophrys
- Species: P. rotundipalpebra

Binomial name
- Proceratophrys rotundipalpebra Martins and Giaretta, 2013

Species of frog

Proceratophrys rotundipalpebra is a species of frog in the family Odontophrynidae. It is endemic to Brazil.

== Original description ==
- Martins LC; Giaretta AA (2013). "Morphological and acoustic characterizastion of Proceratophrys goyana (Lissamphibia: Anura: Odontophrynidae), with the description of a sympatric and related new species". Zootaxa. 3750: 301–320.
