= Proceratophrys goyana =

Conservation status
- Least Concern (IUCN 3.1)

Scientific classification
- Kingdom: Animalia
- Phylum: Chordata
- Class: Amphibia
- Order: Anura
- Family: Odontophrynidae
- Genus: Proceratophrys
- Species: P. goyana

Binomial name
- Proceratophrys goyana Miranda-Ribeiro, 1937

Species of frog

Proceratophrys goyana is a species of frog in the family Odontophrynidae. It is endemic to Brazil.

== Habitat ==
This largely nocturnal frog lives in dry savanna and shrubland in the Cerrado biome. Scientists saw the frog between 300 and 1200 meters above sea level.

Scientists have found the frog in some protected parks: Área de Proteção Ambiental João Leite, Floresta Nacional de Silvania, and Parque Nacional da Chapada dos Veadeiros.

== Reproduction ==
The frog lays eggs in temporary and permanent rocky streams in savannas and in forests. The male frog either calls from the open or hides under a rock or in grass. Scientists believe the female frog places the spawn on rocks in streams and that the tadpoles eat algae and microorganisms from the bottom of the stream.

== Threats ==
The IUCN classifies this frog as least concern of extinction. The principal threat is habitat loss from the long-term exploitation of its range for human use. For many years, the area has been used for cattle grazing, but changes in the price of beef and timber have made tree farms, sugarcane plantations, and soybean plantations more lucrative. Pollution from agrochemicals can also threaten the frog.
