= Proceratophrys ararype =

Conservation status
- Critically Endangered (IUCN 3.1)

Scientific classification
- Kingdom: Animalia
- Phylum: Chordata
- Class: Amphibia
- Order: Anura
- Family: Odontophrynidae
- Genus: Proceratophrys
- Species: P. ararype

Binomial name
- Proceratophrys ararype Mângia, Santana, Cruz, and Feio, 2014

Species of frog

Proceratophrys ararype is a species of frog in the family Odontophrynidae. It is endemic to Brazil.

== Habitat ==
Scientists observed this frog in the Caatinga biome. They believe it is an obligate forest dweller, living in high-humidity areas. Scientists saw the frog 740 meters above sea level.

The frog's range overlapped with some protected parks: Floresta Nacional do Araripe-Apodi, Área de Preservação Ambiental (APA) da Chapada do Araripe.

== Reproduction ==
The male frog sits on the leaf litter next to streams and calls to the female frogs. The female frog deposits her eggs in these streams, and the tadpoles swim and grow there.

== Threats ==
The IUCN classifies this species as critically endangered. Human beings converted forests to farmland, silviculture, livestock grazing areas, and places for human habitation.
