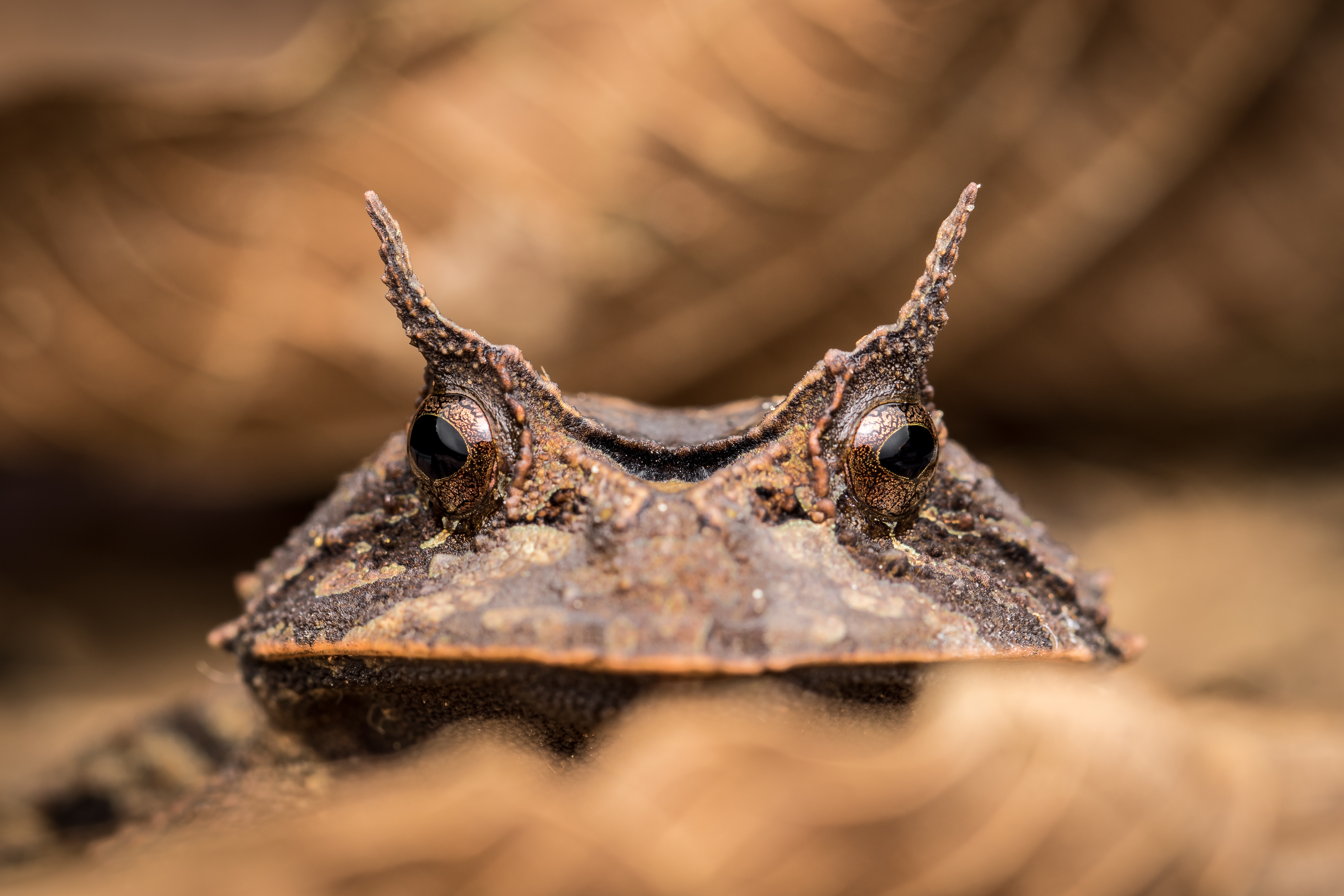

Conservation status
- Least Concern (IUCN 3.1)

Scientific classification
- Kingdom: Animalia
- Phylum: Chordata
- Class: Amphibia
- Order: Anura
- Family: Odontophrynidae
- Genus: Proceratophrys
- Species: P. belzebul

Binomial name
- Proceratophrys belzebul Dias, Amaro, Carvahlo-e-Silva, and Rodrigues, 2013

= Proceratophrys belzebul =

Species of frog

Proceratophrys belzebul is a species of frog in the family Odontophrynidae. It is endemic to Brazil.

== Description ==
The adult male frog measures 40.5–51.3 mm in snout-vent length.

== Habitat ==
This obligate forest dweller has been observed in the leaf litter in both primary forest and secondary forest between 0 and 1000 meters above sea level.

Most of the frog's range is in protected parks. This range overlaps with Parque Estadual da Serra do Mar.

== Reproduction ==
The tadpoles develop in streams.

== Threats ==
The IUCN classifies this frog as least concern of extinction. Most of its range is within protected areas. In the remaining parts of its range, the principal threat is habitat loss associated with agriculture, silviculture, and livestock grazing. Logging was once a major issue, but wood collection is largely subsistence level now.
