= Odontophrynus lavillai =

Conservation status
- Least Concern (IUCN 3.1)

Scientific classification
- Kingdom: Animalia
- Phylum: Chordata
- Class: Amphibia
- Order: Anura
- Family: Odontophrynidae
- Genus: Odontophrynus
- Species: O. lavillai

Binomial name
- Odontophrynus lavillai Cei, 1985

Species of frog

Odontophrynus lavillai is a species of frog in the family Odontophrynidae. It is found in northern Argentina, western and northern Paraguay, central-western Brazil (Mato Grosso do Sul), and eastern Bolivia.

== Home ==
Odontophrynus lavillai is a fossorial frog. It occurs in open habitats from the Chaco to the Interandean Valles. Reproduction takes place in temporary waterbodies, including roadside ditches. It has shown some tolerance to habitat modification.

Scientists have reported the frog in some protected areas: Parque Nacional Defensores del Chaco and Reserva Natural Cañada del Carmen.

== Reproduction ==
This frog reproduces in temporary bodies of water.

== Threats ==
The IUCN classifies this species as least concern of extinction. Its principal threats are habitat loss by cutting down trees for wood usage, farmland, and cattle grazing.
