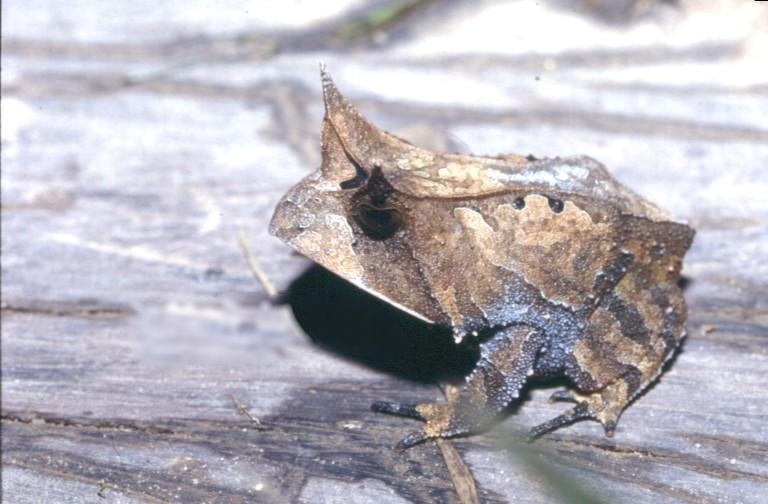

Conservation status
- Least Concern (IUCN 3.1)

Scientific classification
- Kingdom: Animalia
- Phylum: Chordata
- Class: Amphibia
- Order: Anura
- Family: Odontophrynidae
- Genus: Proceratophrys
- Species: P. laticeps

Binomial name
- Proceratophrys laticeps Izecksohn & Peixoto, 1981

= Proceratophrys laticeps =

Species of frog

Proceratophrys laticeps is a species of frog in the family Odontophrynidae. It is endemic to Brazil.

== Habitat ==
This frog lives in the leaf litter in forests of the Atlantic forest biome. It has been observed in secondary forest but not in unforested areas. Scientists saw the frog 500 meters above sea level.

The frog's range includes many protected parks.

== Young ==
The tadpoles develop in streams where the water moves slowly. The mouth is on the bottom of the body.

== Threats ==
The IUCN classifies this frog as least concern of extinction. Principal threats are habitat loss in favor of agriculture, urbanization, livestock cultivation, and sericulture.

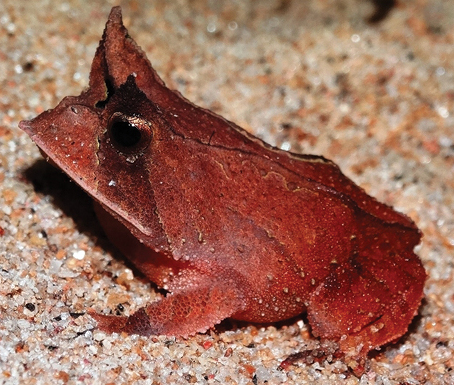
Espírito Santo, Brazil
