= Proceratophrys concavitympanum =

Conservation status
- Least Concern (IUCN 3.1)

Scientific classification
- Kingdom: Animalia
- Phylum: Chordata
- Class: Amphibia
- Order: Anura
- Family: Odontophrynidae
- Genus: Proceratophrys
- Species: P. concavitympanum

Binomial name
- Proceratophrys concavitympanum Giaretta, Bernarde, and Kokubum, 2000

Species of frog

Proceratophrys concavitympanum is a species of frog in the family Odontophrynidae. It is endemic to Brazil and known from Rondônia, northwestern Mato Grosso, Pará, and Tocantins. It is the only Proceratophrys found in the Amazon rainforest.

== Description ==
Adult males measure 40–52 mm (1.6–2.0 in) and adult females 58–60 mm (2.3–2.4 in) in snout–vent length. The head is wider than it is long, almost semi-circular when viewed from above. The tympanum is visible as a depression in skin (hence the specific name concavitympanum, from Latin concavum for concave). The fingers have no webbing whereas the toes are basally webbed. The upper eyelids have large, irregular warts laterally, becoming less prominent medially. Symmetric crests of warts run from the behind the eyelids to the sacral area. Dorsal coloration is cryptic and resembles a dead leaf. The base color is pale yellow; the crests of warts are gray and bordered with gray lacework. The head has two gray mottled areas. The underside is pale pink, possibly with gray reticulations.

Tadpoles in Gosner stage 36 measure 50 mm (2.0 in) in snout–vent length.

== Habitat and conservation ==
These frogs have been found in forest environments along margin of a permanent pond, and near or in small temporary streams with sandy beds. Tadpoles develop in water.

Proceratophrys concavitympanum is classified as least concern of extinction by the IUCN, but its population is declining. Some records are from protected areas, including the Tapirapé Biological Reserve and Riozinho do Anfrísio Extractive Reserve, but most of these proected areas are small and not connected to each other by corridors navigable to the animal. The frog's habitat is in the Amazon basin's "arc of deforestation," meaning that not only have large swaths of forest already been cut down to create farms, particularly cash crop monoculture operations, and areas for cattle grazing. which subjects the frog not only to overal habitat loss but also habitat fragmentation.
