= Proceratophrys bagnoi =

Conservation status
- Endangered (IUCN 3.1)

Scientific classification
- Kingdom: Animalia
- Phylum: Chordata
- Class: Amphibia
- Order: Anura
- Family: Odontophrynidae
- Genus: Proceratophrys
- Species: P. bagnoi

Binomial name
- Proceratophrys bagnoi Brandão, Caramaschi, Vaz-Silva, and Campos, 2013

Species of frog

Proceratophrys bagnoi is a species of frog in the family Odontophrynidae. It is endemic to Brazil.

== Habitat ==
This frog has been found in gallery forests in the Cerrado biome between 550 and 840 meters above sea level.

== Threats ==
The IUCN classifies this species as endangered. The principal threats are habitat loss associated with agriculture and livestock cultivation. Humans also use fire for land conversion. At least one hydroelectric dams project caused flooding that altered this frog's habitat.

== Original description ==
- Brandao RA; Caramaschi U; Vaz-Silva W; Campos LA (2013). "Three new species of Proceratophrys Miranda-Ribeiro 1920 from Brzilian Cerrado (Anura, Odontophrynidae)". Zootaxa. 3750: 321–347.
