= Proceratophrys paviotii =

Conservation status
- Near Threatened (IUCN 3.1)

Scientific classification
- Kingdom: Animalia
- Phylum: Chordata
- Class: Amphibia
- Order: Anura
- Family: Odontophrynidae
- Genus: Proceratophrys
- Species: P. paviotii

Binomial name
- Proceratophrys paviotii Kwet and Faivovich, 2001

Species of frog

Proceratophrys paviotii is a species of frog in the family Odontophrynidae. It is endemic to Brazil.

== Habitat ==
Scientists have found this frog in leaf litter in rainforests between 50 and 800 meters above sea level.

This frog has been reported in many protected parks.

== Reproduction ==
The female frog deposits eggs in streams sandy bottoms. The tadpoles develop in the stream.

== Young ==
The IUCN classifies this species as near threatened. The threats it faces include habitat loss from the century and more of human exploitation of areas in its range from logging, agriculture, silviculture, and livestock grazing.

== Original description ==
- Cruz CAG; Prado GM; Izecksohn E (2005). "Nova especie de Protoceratophrys Miranda-Ribeiro, 1920 do sudeste do Brasil (Amphibia, Anura, Leptodactylidae)". Arquivos do Museu Nacional Rio de Janeiro. 63: 298–295.
