= O. americanus =

O. americanus may refer to:

- Odontophrynus americanus, a frog species
- Oreamnos americanus, a goat species
- Osmanthus americanus, a shrub species

== See also ==
- Americanus (disambiguation)
