= Proceratophrys subguttata =

Conservation status
- Least Concern (IUCN 3.1)

Scientific classification
- Kingdom: Animalia
- Phylum: Chordata
- Class: Amphibia
- Order: Anura
- Family: Odontophrynidae
- Genus: Proceratophrys
- Species: P. subguttata

Binomial name
- Proceratophrys subguttata Izecksohn, Cruz & Peixoto, 1999

Species of frog

Proceratophrys subguttata is a species of frog in the family Odontophrynidae. It is endemic to Brazil.

== Habitat ==
The frog has been found in the leaf litter in rainforests. Scientists observed the frog between 300, and 1000 meters above sea level.

The frog's known range includes protected parks.

== Reproduction ==
The female frog leaves eggs in the backwaters of small streams. The tadpoles develop in the streams.

== Threats ==
The IUCN classifies this species as least concern. Habitat loss in favor of urbanization, agriculture, silviculture, and livestock grazing poses only a small because of the steep ground upon which the frog's remaining habitat rests.
