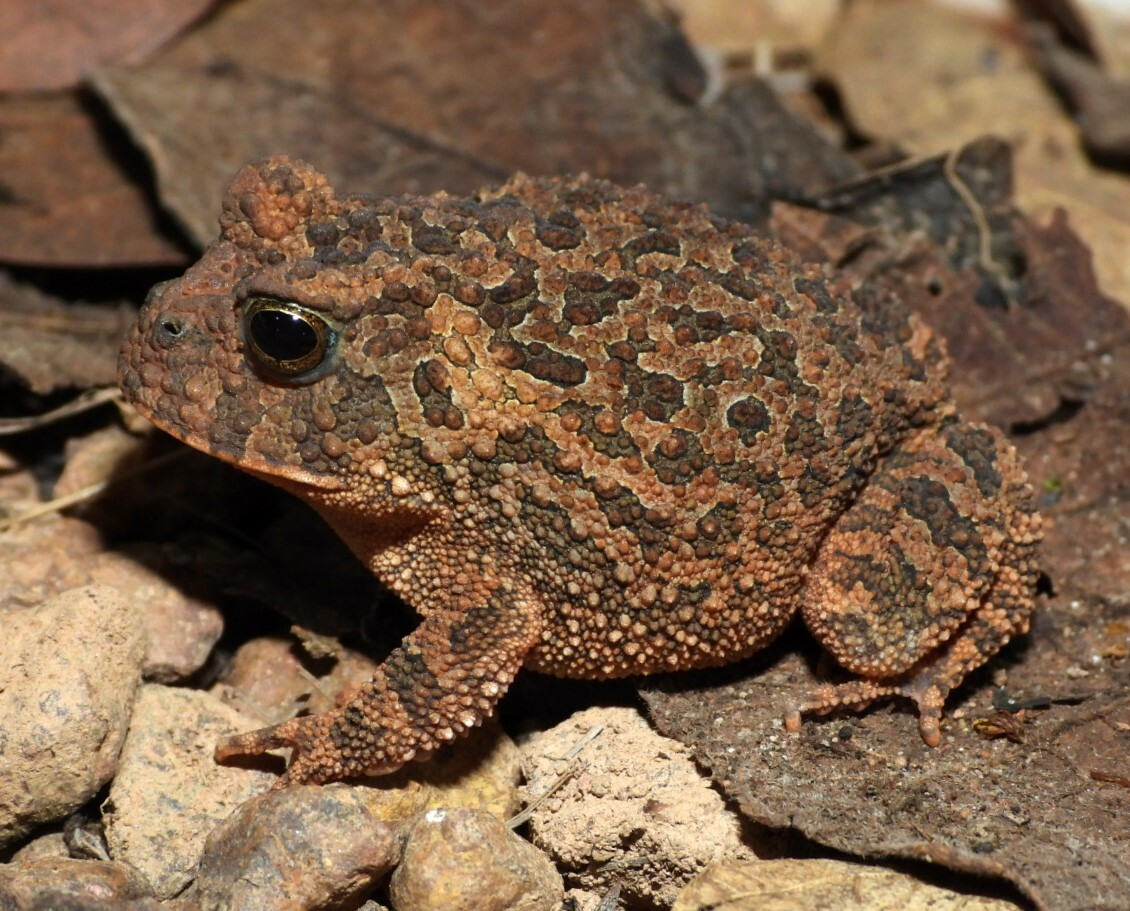

Conservation status
- Least Concern (IUCN 3.1)

Scientific classification
- Kingdom: Animalia
- Phylum: Chordata
- Class: Amphibia
- Order: Anura
- Family: Odontophrynidae
- Genus: Proceratophrys
- Species: P. vielliardi

Binomial name
- Proceratophrys vielliardi Martins & Giaretta, 2011

= Proceratophrys vielliardi =

Species of frog

Proceratophrys vielliardi is a species of frog in the family Odontophrynidae. It is endemic to Brazil.

== Description ==
The adult male frog measures 39.1–41.9 mm in snout-vent length. The skin of the dorsum is light bronw in color with some red-brown on the flanks and light brown on the eyelids and on the back of the head. The belly is light brown in color. There are black-brown and light brown bands on the limbs. The iris of the eye is gold or bronze in color.

== Etymology ==
Scientists named this frog for ornithologist Dr. Jacques Marie Edme Vielliard, who studied Brazil's birds and other fauna, including frogs.

== Habitat ==
This frog has been observed next to streams in the savanna. Scientists saw the frog between 930 and 1270 meters above sea level.

The frog has been reported in three protected parks: Área de Relevante Interesse Ecológico Capetinga - Taquara, Parque Estadual da Serra de Caldas Novas, and Parque Estadual de Paracatu.

== Reproduction ==
The male frogs call to the female frogs in summer (November and December). The female frogs deposit eggs temporary streams and bury them in sand or mud at the bottom. The tadpoles develop in the streams.

== Threats ==
The IUCN classifies this species as least concern. The principal threat is habitat loss from deforestation in favor of cattle grazing. Since the 1980s, the price of agricultural produces has come to exceed that of beef, so humans have converted some of the grazing areas to monoculture plantations producing soybeans, sugarcane, and non-native trees. Agrochemicals may also hurt the frog.
