= Proceratophrys rondonae =

Conservation status
- Data Deficient (IUCN 3.1)

Scientific classification
- Kingdom: Animalia
- Phylum: Chordata
- Class: Amphibia
- Order: Anura
- Family: Odontophrynidae
- Genus: Proceratophrys
- Species: P. rondonae

Binomial name
- Proceratophrys rondonae Prado and Pombal, 2008

Species of frog

Proceratophrys rondonae is a frog in the family Odontophrynidae. It is endemic to Brazil.

== Habitat ==
Scientists observed the frog in the Amazon biome with streams nearby.

This frog has been reported in protected parks, for example Parque Nacional de Pacaás Novos.

== Reproduction ==
The female frog deposits eggs in temporary pools of rainwater.

== Threats ==
The IUCN classifies this species as data deficient. Large swaths of forest have been removed or converted to grazing areas or monoculture, for example soybean monoculture, but there is significant forest remaining in protected areas.

== Original description ==
- Prado; Pombal (2008). "Title not given". Arq Zool Sao Paulo. 39:72.
