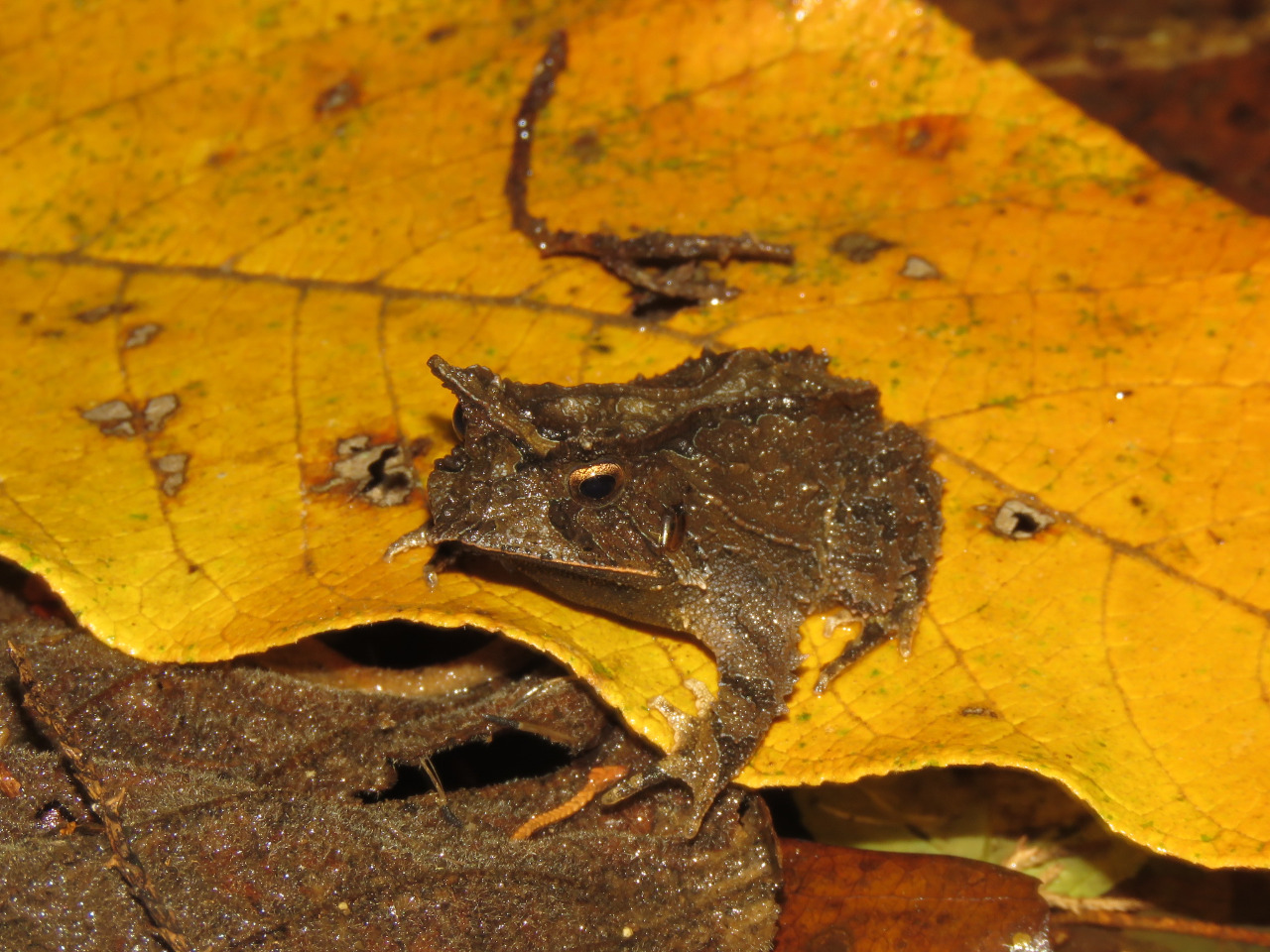

Conservation status
- Least Concern (IUCN 3.1)

Scientific classification
- Kingdom: Animalia
- Phylum: Chordata
- Class: Amphibia
- Order: Anura
- Family: Odontophrynidae
- Genus: Proceratophrys
- Species: P. itamari

Binomial name
- Proceratophrys itamari Mângia, Santana, Cruz, and Feio, 2014

= Proceratophrys itamari =

Species of frog

Proceratophrys itamari is a species of frog in the family Odontophrynidae. It is endemic to Brazil.

== Description ==
The adult male frog measures 31.1–42.5 mm in snout-vent length and the adult female frog 39.5–52.3 mm.

== Etymology ==
Scientists named this frog for Professor Itamar Martins of the Universidade de Taubaté.

== Habitat ==
This frog is found in closed-canopy forests. Scientists saw it on the leaf litter near streams. Scientists observed it between 1200 and 2000 meters above sea level.

Scientists have seen the frog in one protected park, Parque Estadual de Campos de Jordão.

== Reproduction ==
The tadpoles develop in both permanent and temporary streams.

== Threats ==
The IUCN classifies this species as least concern of extinction. Its range had been subject to considerable logging and forest conversion to farms, tree farms, and cattle grazing, but this is currently a localized issue.
