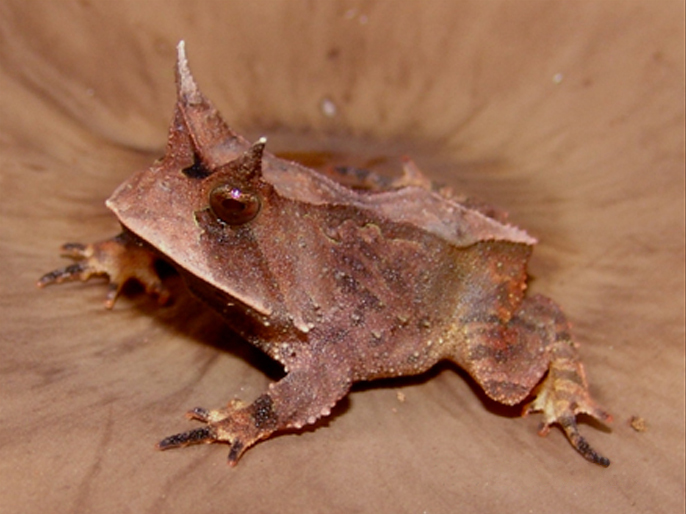

Conservation status
- Least Concern (IUCN 3.1)

Scientific classification
- Kingdom: Animalia
- Phylum: Chordata
- Class: Amphibia
- Order: Anura
- Family: Odontophrynidae
- Genus: Proceratophrys
- Species: P. boiei

Binomial name
- Proceratophrys boiei (Wied-Neuwied, 1825)

Synonyms
- Ceratophrys boiei Wied-Neuwied, 1824; Ceratophris granosa Cuvier, 1829; Ceratophrys fryi Günther, 1873

= Proceratophrys boiei =

Species of frog

Proceratophrys boiei, commonly known as Boie's frog, is a species of frog in the family Odontophrynidae. It is endemic to eastern and southeastern Brazil. This common frog is found in primary and secondary forest, on the forest edge, and in degraded areas near forest. This species is present in the illegal pet trade. Its habitat is subject to loss caused by agriculture, wood plantations, livestock grazing, clear-cutting, human settlement and tourism. The specific name boiei was given in honour of German zoologist Heinrich Boie or his brother Friedrich Boie.

== Description ==
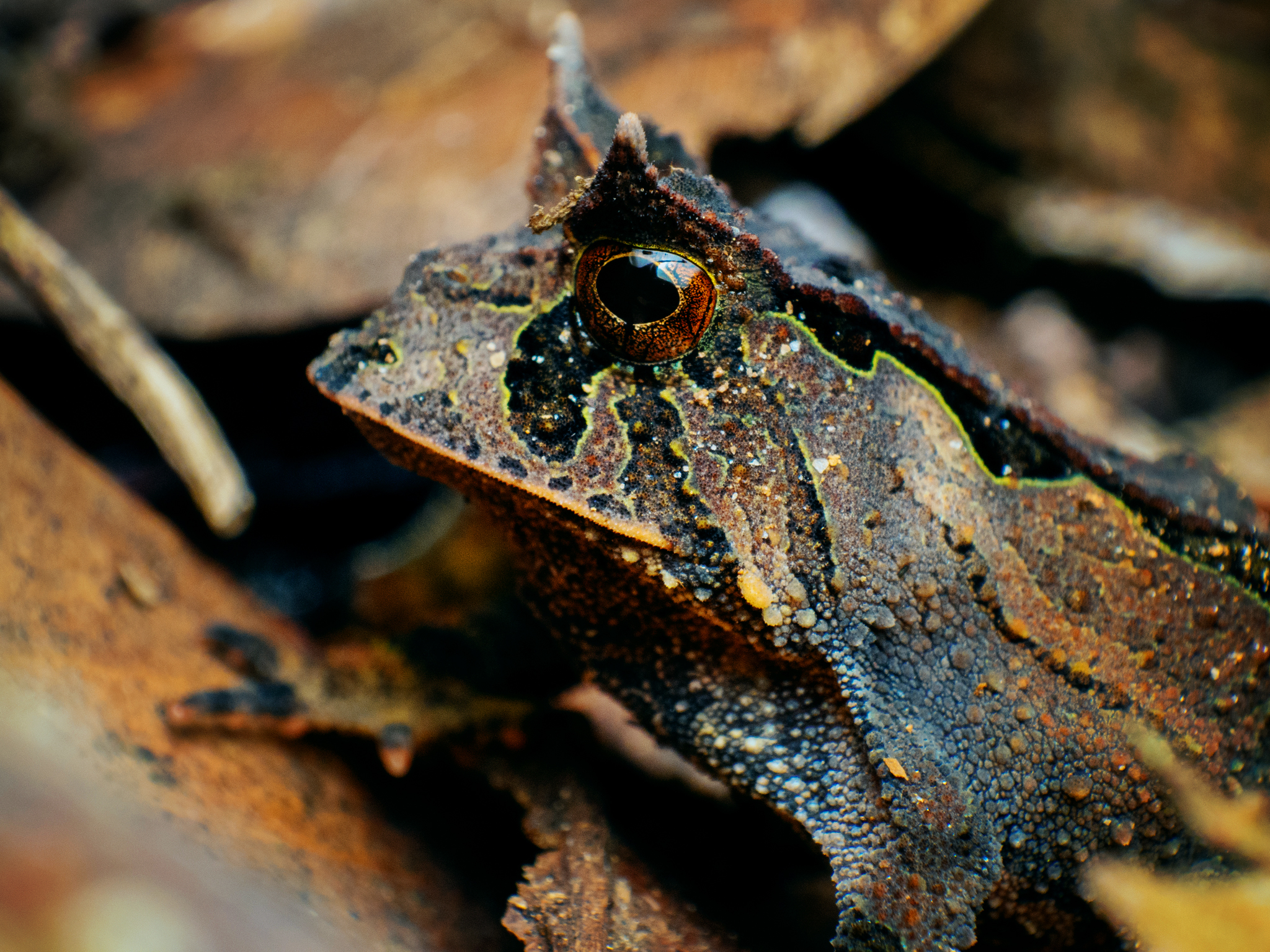
Juvenile Proceratophrys boiei from Carlos Botelho State Park, Brazil

Proceratophrys boiei is a moderate-sized, robust frog, growing to a length of between 40 and 70 mm (1.6 and 2.8 in), with males tending to be slightly smaller than females.

Both head and body are relatively broad, the snout is rounded, and long, tapering peaks of skin project from above the eyes. The surface of the skin on both back and flanks is covered with warts. The colouring is an irregular geometric pattern of brown, black, yellow, orange and red, such that the frog becomes nearly invisible against the background of leaf litter among which it lives. There is also a broad brown or grey dorsal stripe.

== Ecology ==
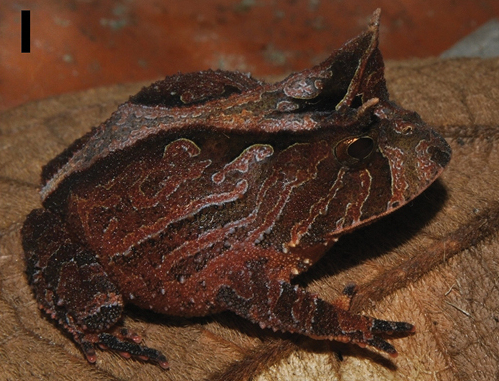
Espírito Santo, Brazil

=== Diet ===
Proceratophrys boiei feeds largely on insects and their larvae. An examination of the stomach contents showed that beetles constitute about 40% of the diet, with orthopterans (grasshoppers and crickets) constituting another 25%.

=== Defensive behaviour ===
When disturbed, Proceratophrys boiei makes a leap and then flattens itself on the leaf litter with its limbs stiff and splayed; with its skin protuberances and cryptic colouring it then closely resembles dead leaves and is likely to be overlooked by predators that hunt by sight. This stiff-legged defensive posture has now been recorded in at least seven frog species in four different families; one of these is Scythrophrys sawayae, which is also found in the forests of southeastern Brazil.

== Young ==
The adult frog lays eggs in swamps and streams. At stage 34, the tadpole has an elliptical body and dorsolaterally located eyes. It is light brown in color with some darker brown marks. There are gold marks on the belly. The tadpoles are benthic.

== Status ==
This frog has a wide range and a presumed large total population. The threats it faces are likely to be as a result of such human activities as forest clearance for urban construction, agriculture, plantation crops, tree farms, and grazing, and it is also collected for the pet trade. The International Union for Conservation of Nature has rated its conservation status as being of "least concern" as any decrease in population sizes is likely to be at too slow a rate to be sufficient to classify it in a more threatened category.

Scientists have seen this animal in protected parks and its range overlaps with many: Parque Estadual Intervales, Estação Biológica de Boracéia, Serra do Japi, Reserva Biológica Augusto Ruschi, RPPN Serra do Caraça, Parque Nacional da Tijuca, Parque Nacional da Serra da Bocaina, PETAR, Parque Nacional do Itatiaia, Parque Nacional da Serra do Órgãos, and Parque Estadual da Serra do Mar.
