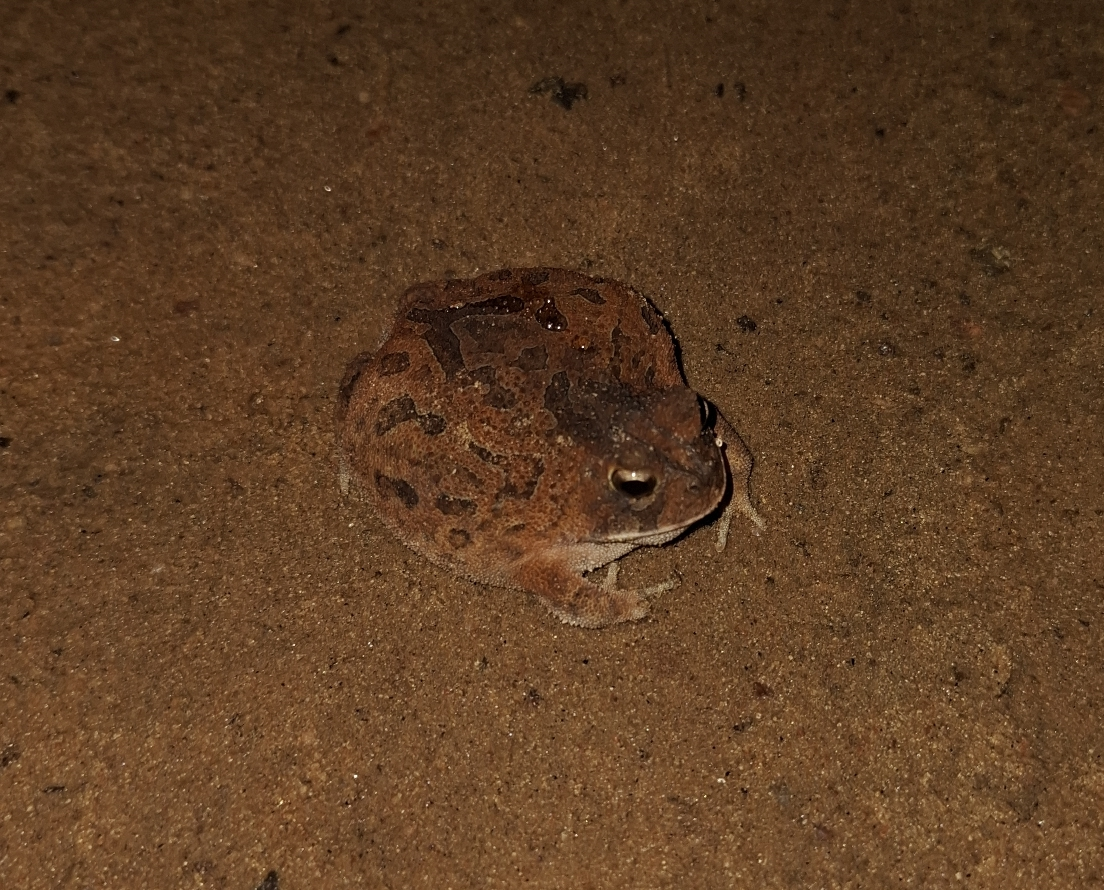

Conservation status
- Endangered (IUCN 3.1)

Scientific classification
- Kingdom: Animalia
- Phylum: Chordata
- Class: Amphibia
- Order: Anura
- Family: Odontophrynidae
- Genus: Proceratophrys
- Species: P. redacta

Binomial name
- Proceratophrys redacta Teixeira, Amaro, Recoder, Vechio, and Rodrigues, 2012

= Proceratophrys redacta =

Species of frog

Proceratophrys redacta is a species of frog in the family Odontophrynidae. It is endemic to Brazil.

== Habitat ==
Scientists observed this frog near streams in dry Caatinga habitats between 890 and 1250 meters above sea level.

The frog's range overlaps Parque Estadual do Morro do Chapéu but scientists have not reported it inside the park.

== Threats ==
The IUCN classifies this species as endangered. The principal threats are habitat loss associated with iron mining, agriculture, and livestock grazing. Humans also use fire to convert the forest to fields. Scientists also believe wind farms might hurt the frog but they have not confirmed this.

== Original description ==
- Teixeira Jr M; Amaro RC; Recoder RS; Vechio FD; Rodrigues MT (2012). "A new dwarf species of Proceratophrys Miranda-Ribeiro, 1920 (Anura, Cycloramphicae) from the highlands of Chapada Diamantina, Bahia, Brazil". Zootaxa. 3551: 25–42.
