= Proceratophrys carranca =

Conservation status
- Vulnerable (IUCN 3.1)

Scientific classification
- Kingdom: Animalia
- Phylum: Chordata
- Class: Amphibia
- Order: Anura
- Family: Odontophrynidae
- Genus: Proceratophrys
- Species: P. carranca

Binomial name
- Proceratophrys carranca Godinho, Moura, Lacerda, and Feio, 2013

Species of frog

Proceratophrys carranca is a species of frog in the family Odontophrynidae. It is endemic to Brazil.

== Description ==
The adult male frog measures 31.6–39.9 mm in snout-vent length. It has black pigmentation in the gular area. Its belly is cream-white in color with light brown marks.

== Etymology ==
Scientists named this frog carranca after statues associated with safe travel down the São Francisco River. The statues also represent the artisans and communities associated with rivers and with the São Francisco specifically.

== Habitat ==
This frog lives on the ground near streams in shrubland. Scientists observed the frog 654 meters above sea level.

Scientists have reported the frog in one protected place, Parque Nacional Grande Sertão Veredas.

== Threats ==
The IUCN classifies this frog as vulnerable to extinction. The principal threats are habitat loss associated with agriculture, livestock grazing, and urbanization and with the fires used for land conversion.
