= Odontophrynus reigi =

Scientific classification
- Kingdom: Animalia
- Phylum: Chordata
- Class: Amphibia
- Order: Anura
- Family: Odontophrynidae
- Genus: Odontophrynus
- Species: O. reigi

Binomial name
- Odontophrynus reigi Rosset, Fadel, Guimarães, Carvalho, Ceron, Pedrozo, Serejo, Souza, Baldo, and Mângia, 2021

Species of frog

Odontophrynus reigi is a species of frog in the family Odontophrynidae. It is endemic to Brazil, Argentina, and Paraguay.

== Description ==
The adult male frog measures 40.3 to 55.8 mm in snout-vent length and the adult female frog 46.5 to 57.4 mm. This frog hides most of its body underground when it is not looking for food. Scientists believe this frog is relatively tolerant to human disturbance.

== Etymology ==
Scientists named this frog scientist Osvaldo Alfredo Reig.

== Habitat ==
Scientists observed the frog in grasslands and forests.

== Reproduction ==
This frog is an explosive breeder, reproducing after heavy rain. The male frog sits next to the water and calls to the female frogs. The female frog deposits eggs in temporary ponds.
