= Proceratophrys salvatori =

Conservation status
- Least Concern (IUCN 3.1)

Scientific classification
- Kingdom: Animalia
- Phylum: Chordata
- Class: Amphibia
- Order: Anura
- Family: Odontophrynidae
- Genus: Proceratophrys
- Species: P. salvatori

Binomial name
- Proceratophrys salvatori (Caramaschi, 1996)

Synonyms
- Odontophrynus salvatori Caramaschi, 1996

Species of frog

Proceratophrys salvatori is a species of frog in the family Odontophrynidae. It is endemic to Brazil and known from eastern Goiás and the Federal District.

== Habitat ==
The frog's natural habitat is Cerrado savanna, where it occurs on the ground near waterbodies. It has been found in gallery forest and in open-canopy forest, but not in areas that humans have substantially disturbed. Scientists observed it between 100 and 800 meters above sea level. Its range includes many protected areas.

== Reproduction ==
While this frog may be nocturnal, male frogs have been heard calling during the day. The tadpoles develop in small temporary streams.

== Threats ==
The IUCN classifies this frog as least concern of extinction and notes that its population is decreasing. Its principal threat is habitat loss. Human beings have converted large amounts of forest to livestock grazing areas and have since converted many of those grazing areas to soybean or sugarcane monoculture farms or to tree farms for non-native tree species. Agrochemicals can also hurt this frog.
