= Proceratophrys pombali =

Conservation status
- Least Concern (IUCN 3.1)

Scientific classification
- Kingdom: Animalia
- Phylum: Chordata
- Class: Amphibia
- Order: Anura
- Family: Odontophrynidae
- Genus: Proceratophrys
- Species: P. pombali

Binomial name
- Proceratophrys pombali Mângia, Santana, Cruz, and Feio, 2014

Species of frog

Proceratophrys pombali is a species of frog in the family Odontophrynidae. It is endemic to Brazil.

== Description ==
The adult male frog measures 31.9–41.9 mm in snout-vent length, and one adult female frog was found to measure 52.5 mm.

== Etymology ==
Scientists named this frog for Professor José Perez Pombal Jr.

== Habitat ==
This frog has been found on the leaf litter in closed-canopy forests and in coastal shrublands. Scientists observed the frog between 40 and 670 meters above sea level.

The frog's home is inside part of one protected park Parque Estadual da Serra do Mar.

== Young ==
The tadpoles develop in temporary and permanent streams.

== Threats ==
The IUCN classifies this frog as least concern of extinction. The frog's highland habitats are Atlantic forest, much of which is in an established protected park. At lower elevations, human beings have engaged in significant habitat conversion to develop coastal areas, but most of this has slowed down since the 1980s.
