= Proceratophrys cristiceps =

Conservation status
- Least Concern (IUCN 3.1)

Scientific classification
- Kingdom: Animalia
- Phylum: Chordata
- Class: Amphibia
- Order: Anura
- Family: Odontophrynidae
- Genus: Proceratophrys
- Species: P. cristiceps

Binomial name
- Proceratophrys cristiceps (Müller, 1884)

Synonyms
- Ceratophrys cristiceps Müller, 1883; Stombus cristiceps (Müller, 1883)

Species of frog

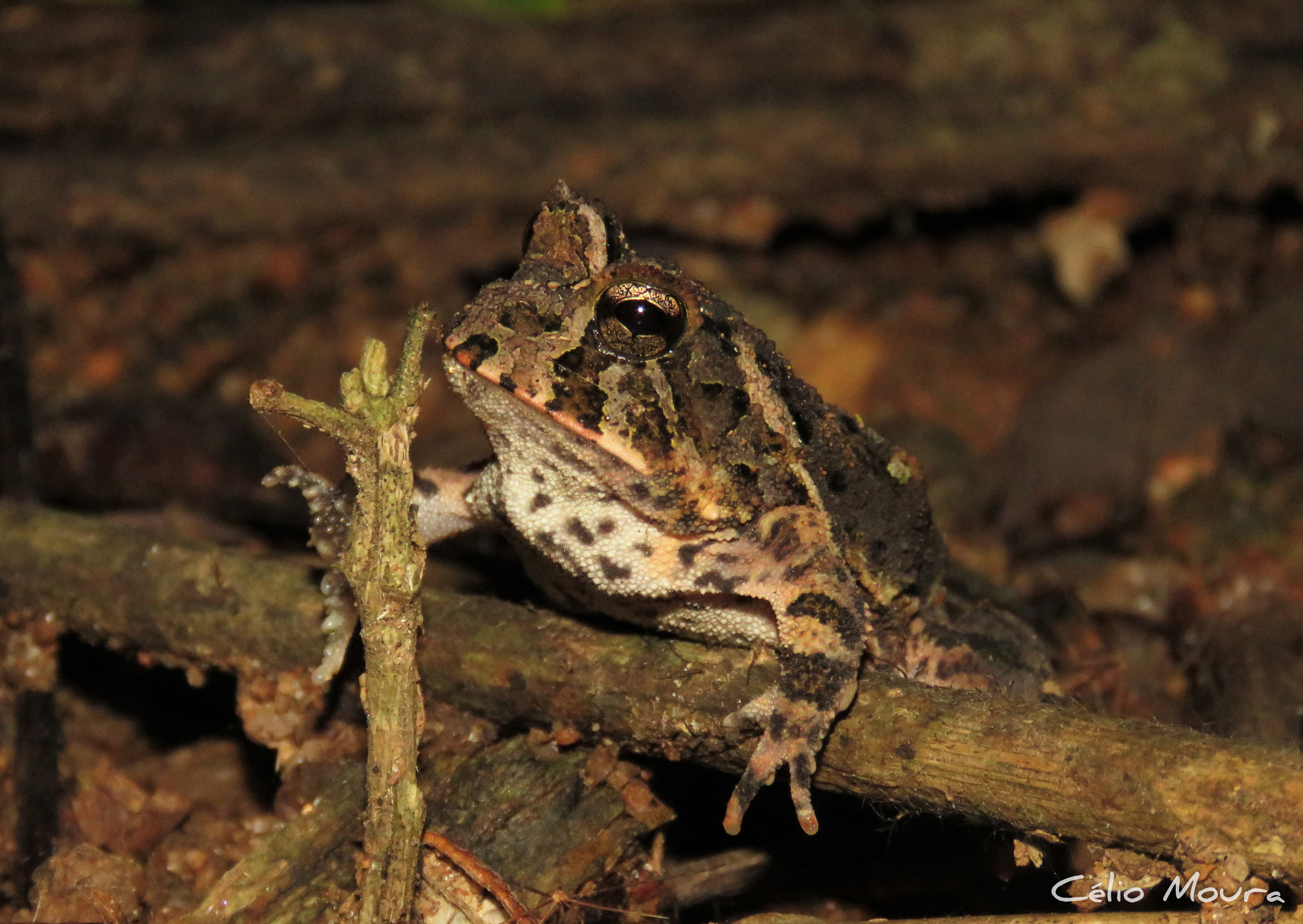

Proceratophrys cristiceps is a species of frog in the family Odontophrynidae. It is endemic to northeastern Brazil and occurs in the coastal region from the Bay of All Saints in central Bahia northward to the state of Rio Grande do Norte. Common name Muller's smooth horned frog has been proposed for it.

== Description ==
Adult males measure 40–50 mm (1.6–2.0 in) and adult females, based on only two specimens, 44–45 mm (1.7–1.8 in) in snout–vent length. The head is wider than it is long. The snout is rounded from above but obtuse in lateral view. The tympanum is not externally visible. The canthal crests are poorly defined while the frontoparietal crest is not developed. The toes are partially webbed. The dorsum is scattered with several warts and small granules. The ventral surfaces, apart from the hands and feet, are covered by many small, circular, uniform warts and small granules. Dorsal coloration consists of marbling of various shades of brown on cream background, sometimes with a reddish tinge.

== Habitat ==
Proceratophrys cristiceps occurs in the Atlantic Forest as well as its ecotone towards the Caatinga dry forest.

== Reproduction ==
Males call near temporary streams. The eggs are laid in the temporary pools and streams where the tadpoles later develop.

At stage 39, the tadpoles have an oval-round body. The body is about 41% of the total length of the animal. The tadpole has large eyes. The skin of the dorsum is olive in color with dark brown blotches. The anterior portion of the ventral area is white in color and the posterior portion is darker. The internal organs are visible through the skin.

== Conservation and threats ==
The probable threat to this presently common species is habitat loss caused by agriculture, livestock grazing, clear-cutting, human settlement, and fire. It is present in several protected areas and its range overlaps with many more: Scientists saw the frog in some protected parks, and they believe it may also live in many more: Área de Preservação Ambiental Aldeia-Beberibe, Área de Preservação Ambiental da Serra de Baturite, Área de Preservação Ambiental do Litoral Norte, Área de Preservação Ambiental Serra da Ibiapaba, Parque Nacional da Serra das Confusões, Parque Nacional de Sete Cidades, Parque Nacional de Ubajara, Parque Nacional do Catimbau, Reserva Biológica de Serra Negra, Área de Preservação Ambiental da Chapada do Araripe, Estação Ecológica de Aiuaba, Parque Estadual Sítio Fundão, and Reserva Particular do Patrimônio Natural Fazenda Olho Dágua do Urucú.

== Original description ==
- Müller, F. (1883). "Dritter Nachtrag". Katalog der herpetologischen Sammlung des Basler Museums. Basel: J. G. Bauer.
