= Proceratophrys tupinamba =

Conservation status
- Least Concern (IUCN 3.1)

Scientific classification
- Kingdom: Animalia
- Phylum: Chordata
- Class: Amphibia
- Order: Anura
- Family: Odontophrynidae
- Genus: Proceratophrys
- Species: P. concavitympanum

Binomial name
- Proceratophrys concavitympanum Prado and Pombal, 2008

Species of frog

Proceratophrys tupinamba is a species of frog in the family Odontophrynidae. It is endemic to Brazil.

== Habitat ==
Scientists observed this frog in forests on the island of Ilha Grande, which is off the coast of Rio de Janeiro state. They found it as high as 1131 meters above sea level.

All of the island is covered by protected parks, some of them overlapping. Scientists observed the frog in Parque Estadual da Ilha Grande. They believe it also lives in Área de Proteção de Tamoios and Reserva Biológica Estadual Da Praia Do Sul.

== Reproduction ==
Scientists found the tadpoles to be most abundant in the rainy season. They observed the tadpoles in streams. The tadpoles live at the bottom of the stream.

== Threats ==
The IUCN classifies this frog as least concern. Its entire known range occurs within protected areas. While people do visit the island to hike and enjoy its beaches, scientists believe this threat is small and very localized. The largest threats facing this frog are climate change and associated changes in weather.

== Original description ==
- Prado; Pombal (2008). "Title not specified". Arq Zool Sao Paulo. 39:68.
