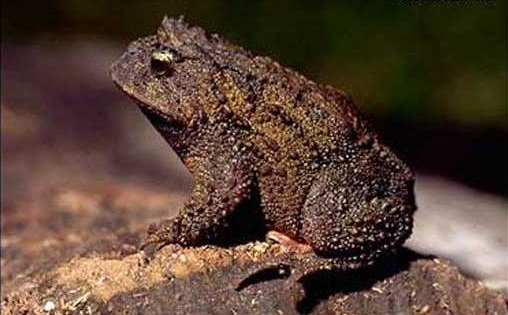

Conservation status
- Least Concern (IUCN 3.1)

Scientific classification
- Kingdom: Animalia
- Phylum: Chordata
- Class: Amphibia
- Order: Anura
- Family: Odontophrynidae
- Genus: Proceratophrys
- Species: P. bigibbosa

Binomial name
- Proceratophrys bigibbosa (Peters, 1872)

Synonyms
- Ceratophrys bigibbosa Peters, 1872 Proceratophrys cristinae Braun, 1973

= Proceratophrys bigibbosa =

Species of frog

Proceratophrys bigibbosa is a species of frog in the family Odontophrynidae. It is found in the Misiones Province in the northeastern Argentina and in Rio Grande do Sul and Santa Catarina in southern Brazil; its range might extend into the adjacent Paraguay. Common names Peters' smooth horned frog and Cristina's smooth horned frog have been coined for it.

== Description ==
Adult males measure 36–44 mm (1.4–1.7 in) and adult females 51–53 mm (2.0–2.1 in) in snout–vent length. The body is robust and stout. The snout is short and broadly rounded. The eyes are large; there are two well-developed bulbous, bony postocular swellings. The tympanum is indistinct. The canthus rostralis is demarcated by a prominent curved tubercular ridge. Skin is dorsally granulated with variably formed and sized tubercles. The limbs are short and robust; the fingers have no webbing whereas the toes are somewhat webbed. Dorsal coloration is variable, generally consisting of various shades of dark brown to brown and with regular pattern of dark and light longitudinally arranged markings. The upper eyelids are connected by a narrow, curved, whitish or tan stripe. Females have black throat with reddish spots, whereas males have uniformly black throat. The belly is orange or red and is irregularly spotted with black. The ventral surfaces of the limbs are black with red spots.

== Habitat and conservation ==
Proceratophrys bigibbosa occurs in Araucaria forests in mountainous regions at 300–1,200 m (980–3,940 ft) above sea level. Outside the breeding season, it is terrestrial and occurs in the leaf-litter. Breeding takes place in streams, and the eggs may be deposited under stones of stream beds.

The IUCN classifies Proceratophrys bigibbosa as least concern. It is threatened by habitat loss from deforestation in favor of smallholder livestock ranching and pine plantations. It is also threatened by pollution of soil and water. Its range overlaps with several protected areas.
