= Proceratophrys dibernardoi =

Conservation status
- Least Concern (IUCN 3.1)

Scientific classification
- Kingdom: Animalia
- Phylum: Chordata
- Class: Amphibia
- Order: Anura
- Family: Odontophrynidae
- Genus: Proceratophrys
- Species: P. dibernardoi

Binomial name
- Proceratophrys dibernardoi Brandão, Caramaschi, Vaz-Silva, and Campos, 2013

Species of frog

Proceratophrys dibernardoi is a species of frog in the family Odontophrynidae. It is endemic to Brazil.

== Habitat ==
This frog has been found on the leaf litter near streams in open areas and riparian forest. Because it has also been seen in pasture and soybean plantations, scientists think it could tolerate some habitat disturbance. Scientists observed the frog between 520 and 855 meters above sea level.

Scientists have seen the frog in some protected areas: Área de Proteção Ambiental Rio Araguaia, Córrego Rico, Couto Magalhães and Rio Araguainha, Parque Estadual Matas do Segredo, and Parque Estadual Serra Azul.

== Threats ==
The IUCN classifies this species as least concern of extinction. The principal threats are habitat loss associated with agriculture and livestock grazing. Humans also use fire to change the forest to fields.

== Original description ==
- Brandao RA; Caramaschi U; Vaz-Silva W; Campos LA (2013). "Three new species of Proceratophrys Miranda-Ribeiro 1920 from Brzilian Cerrado (Anura, Odontophrynidae)". Zootaxa. 3750: 321–347.
