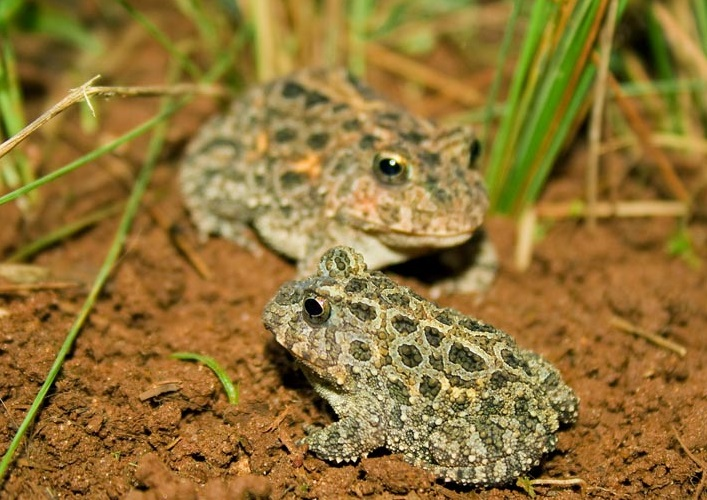

Conservation status
- Least Concern (IUCN 3.1)

Scientific classification
- Kingdom: Animalia
- Phylum: Chordata
- Class: Amphibia
- Order: Anura
- Family: Odontophrynidae
- Genus: Proceratophrys
- Species: P. moratoi

Binomial name
- Proceratophrys moratoi (Jim & Caramaschi, 1980)

Synonyms
- Odontophrynus moratoi Jim & Caramaschi, 1980

= Proceratophrys moratoi =

Species of frog

Proceratophrys moratoi is a species of frog in the family Odontophrynidae. It is endemic to the São Paulo state, Brazil. Its local name is botucatu escuerzo.

== Description ==
The frog measures about 27.6 to 35.7 mm in snout-vent length. There is no webbed skin on any of its feet.

== Habitat ==
This frog lives in swampy places next to streams in savanna and shrubland in the Cerrado biome. People also find them in small forest remnants next to farms. Scientists observed the frog between 410 and 1140 meters above sea level.

This frog lives in many protected parks: Área de Preservação Ambiental Corumbataí, Botucatu and Tejupá Perimetro Corumbataí, Estação Ecológica de Itirapina, and RPPN Olavo Egydio Setubal.

== Reproduction ==
The female frog places her eggs in moving water in swamps. The free-swimming tadpoles develop in the swamp. The tadpole is red-brown in color with silver or gray marks. There is a dark spot on the fin on its back. The tail is light brown in color with darker spots. The caudal musculature has dots on it.

== Threats ==
Scientists from the IUCN classify this frog as least concern of extinction. Its range has been subject to exploitation in favor of urbanization, livestock grazing, sericulture, and other forms of agriculture. In recent years, changes in the price of beef have favored timber farms and sugar and soybean plantations. Agrochemicals may also be an issue.
