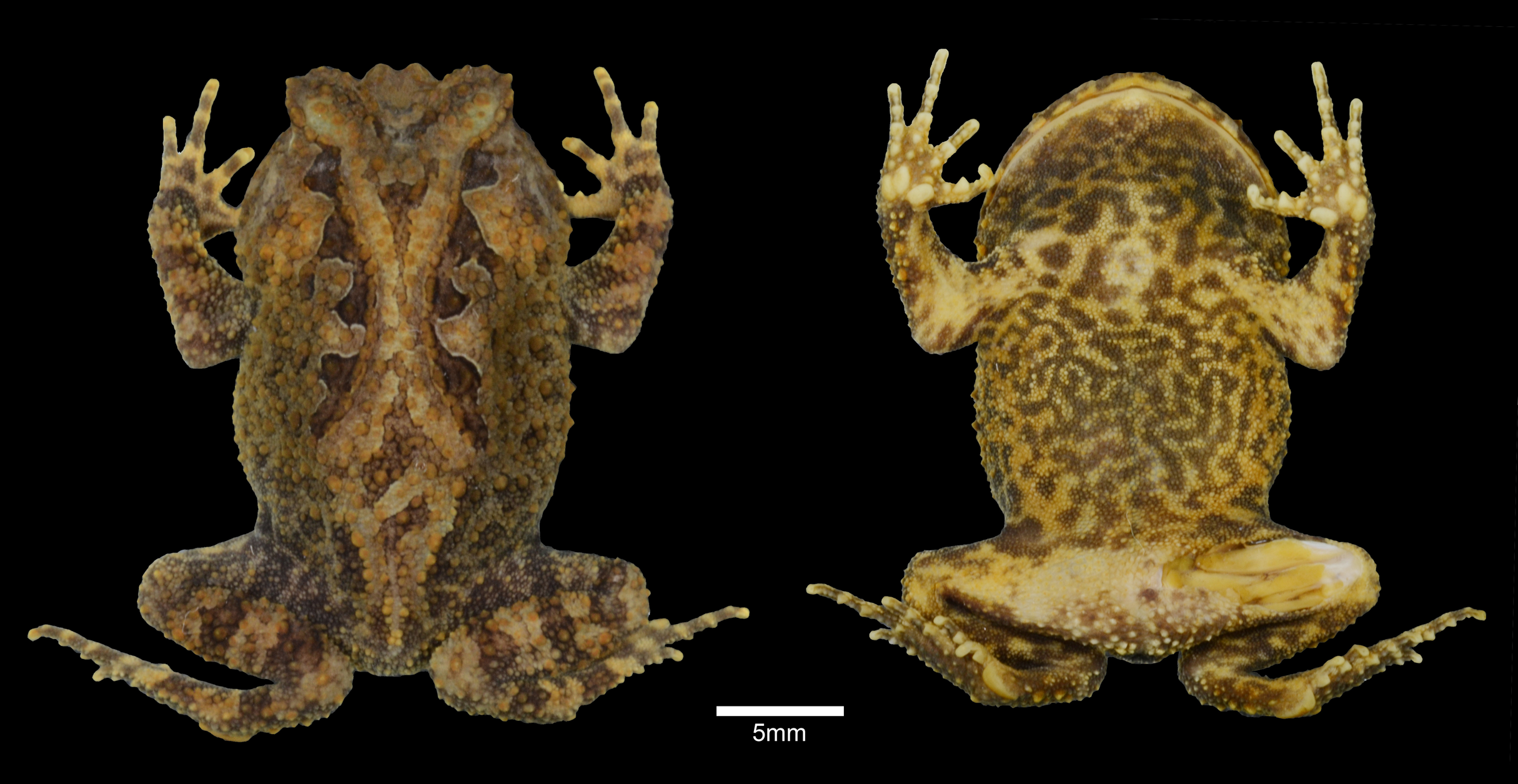

Conservation status
- Data Deficient (IUCN 3.1)

Scientific classification
- Kingdom: Animalia
- Phylum: Chordata
- Class: Amphibia
- Order: Anura
- Family: Odontophrynidae
- Genus: Proceratophrys
- Species: P. korekore

Binomial name
- Proceratophrys korekore Santana, Alves da Silva, Sant'Anna, Shepard, and Mângia, 2021

= Proceratophrys korekore =

Species of frog

Proceratophrys korekore is a species of frog in the family Odontophrynidae. It is endemic to Brazil.

== Description ==
The adult male frog measures 39.8 – 44.1 mm in snout-vent length and the adult female frog 43.8 – 57.6 mm. This frog's entire dorsal surface is covered in warts of varying sizes.

== Etymology ==
"Korekore" is the word for "frog" in the language of the Munduruku indigenous people, who live near where the frog was found.

== Habitat ==
Scientists saw this frog near streams in rainforest habitats. The male frog sits in the leaf litter and calls to the female frogs. Scientists saw the frog between 200 and 270 meters above sea level.

== Reproduction ==
Scientists believe this frog breeds explosively after seasonal rains, like its congeners. The tadpoles develop in temporary streams.

== Threats ==
The IUCN classifies this frog as data deficient. The threats it faces seem to include deforestation from logging and conversion to cattle grazing. Illegal gold mining and the associated pollution can also harm this frog.

== Original description ==
- Santana, DJ; L Alves da Silva; AC Sant'Anna; DB Shepard; S Mângia (2021). "A new species of Proceratophrys Miranda-Ribeiro, 1920 (Anura, Odontophrynidae) from Southern Amazonia, Brazil". PeerJ: 9:e12012.
