= Proceratophrys gladius =

Conservation status
- Data Deficient (IUCN 3.1)

Scientific classification
- Kingdom: Animalia
- Phylum: Chordata
- Class: Amphibia
- Order: Anura
- Family: Odontophrynidae
- Genus: Proceratophrys
- Species: P. gladius

Binomial name
- Proceratophrys gladius Mângia, Santana, Cruz, and Feio, 2014

Species of frog

Proceratophrys gladius is a species of frog in the family Odontophrynidae. It is endemic to Brazil.

== Description ==
The adult male frog measures 31.6–45.9 mm in snout-vent length, and the adult female frog 36.9–48.5 mm. The crest on its head resembles a short sword.

== Etymology ==
Scientists named this frog gladius because the protrusions on its head resemble a Roman short sword.

== Habitat ==
Scientists are not sure which habitat this frog prefers. They found the first samples 1600 meters above sea level in a protected park, Parque Nacional da Serra da Bocaina.

== Threats ==
The IUCN classifies this species as data deficient. The type locality is located within a protected park, and they believe it may live in other places as well.
