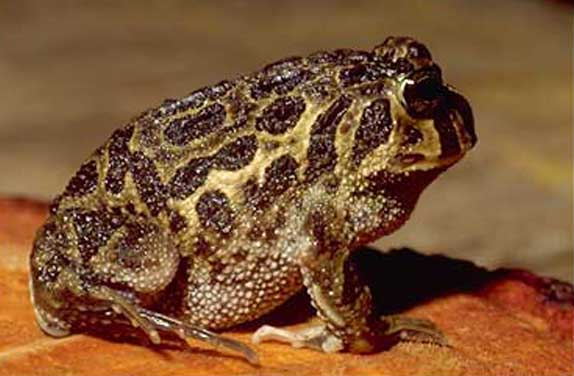
- Odontophrynus americanus

Scientific classification
- Kingdom: Animalia
- Phylum: Chordata
- Class: Amphibia
- Order: Anura
- Family: Odontophrynidae
- Genus: Odontophrynus; Reinhardt and Lütken, 1862

Type species
- Odontophrynus cultripes Reinhardt and Lütken, 1862

= Odontophrynus =

Genus of amphibians

Odontophrynus is a genus of frogs in the family Odontophrynidae. They are found in southern and eastern South America. They are sometimes known as the escuerzos.

== Species ==
The genus contains the following species:

- Odontophrynus alipioi (Carvalho, 1946)
- Odontophrynus americanus (Duméril and Bibron, 1841)
- Odontophrynus carvalhoi Savage and Cei, 1965
- Odontophrynus cordobae Martino and Sinsch, 2002
- Odontophrynus cultripes Reinhardt and Lütken, 1862
- Odontophrynus juquinha Rocha, Sena, Pezzuti, Leite, Svartman, Rosset, Baldo, and Garcia, 2017
- Odontophrynus lavillai Cei, 1985
- Odontophrynus maisuma Rosset, 2008
- Odontophrynus monachus Caramaschi and Napoli, 2012
- Odontophrynus occidentalis (Berg, 1896)
- Odontophrynus reigi Rosset, Fadel, Guimarães, Carvalho, Ceron, Pedrozo, Serejo, Souza, Baldo, and Mângia, 2021
