= Proceratophrys phyllostomus =

Conservation status
- Data Deficient (IUCN 3.1)

Scientific classification
- Kingdom: Animalia
- Phylum: Chordata
- Class: Amphibia
- Order: Anura
- Family: Odontophrynidae
- Genus: Proceratophrys
- Species: P. phyllostomus

Binomial name
- Proceratophrys phyllostomus Izecksohn, Cruz & Peixoto, 1999

Species of frog

Proceratophrys phyllostomus is a species of frog in the family Odontophrynidae. It is endemic to Brazil.

== Habitat ==
Scientists observed the frog on leaf litter in primary and secondary forest. Scientists observed the frog between 680 and 800 meters above sea level.

Scientists found a few dozen kilometers from Reserva Particular Do Patrimônio Natural and Reserva Biológica Augusto Ruschi but they have not reported it inside either of these protected places.

== Threats ==
The IUCN classifies this frog as data deficient. Threats include habitat loss in favor of agriculture, tree farms, and livestock grazing. Scientists note that while the area has undergone considerable deforestation, the rate of tree removal has slowed significantly, and some areas may be growing back.
