= Proceratophrys sanctaritae =

Conservation status
- Endangered (IUCN 3.1)

Scientific classification
- Kingdom: Animalia
- Phylum: Chordata
- Class: Amphibia
- Order: Anura
- Family: Odontophrynidae
- Genus: Proceratophrys
- Species: P. sanctaritae

Binomial name
- Proceratophrys sanctaritae Cruz and Napoli, 2010

Species of frog

Proceratophrys sanctaritae is a species of frog in the family Odontophrynidae. It is endemic to Brazil.

== Habitat ==
This frog has been found in the leaf litter in Atlantic forests, both in shallow streams and far from water. Scientists observed the frog between 560 and 960 meters above sea level.

Scientists have observed the frog in a single protected park, Refúgio da Vida Silvestre de Amargosa, which contains the largest tract of forest remaining in the area.

== Threats ==
The IUCN classifies this species as endangered. Its range has been subject to considerable deforestation in favor of logging, livestock grazing, and agriculture, principally small farms for non-native crops, such as bananas and cacao. The forest that remains is heavily fragmented and subject to the edge effect, which renders the habitat drier.

== Original description ==
- Cruz CAG; Napoli MF (2010). "A new species of smooth horned frog, genus Protoceratophrys Miranda-ribeiro (Amphibia: Anura: Cycloramphidae), from the Atlantic rainforest of eastern Bahia, Brazil". Zootaxa. 2660: 57–67.
