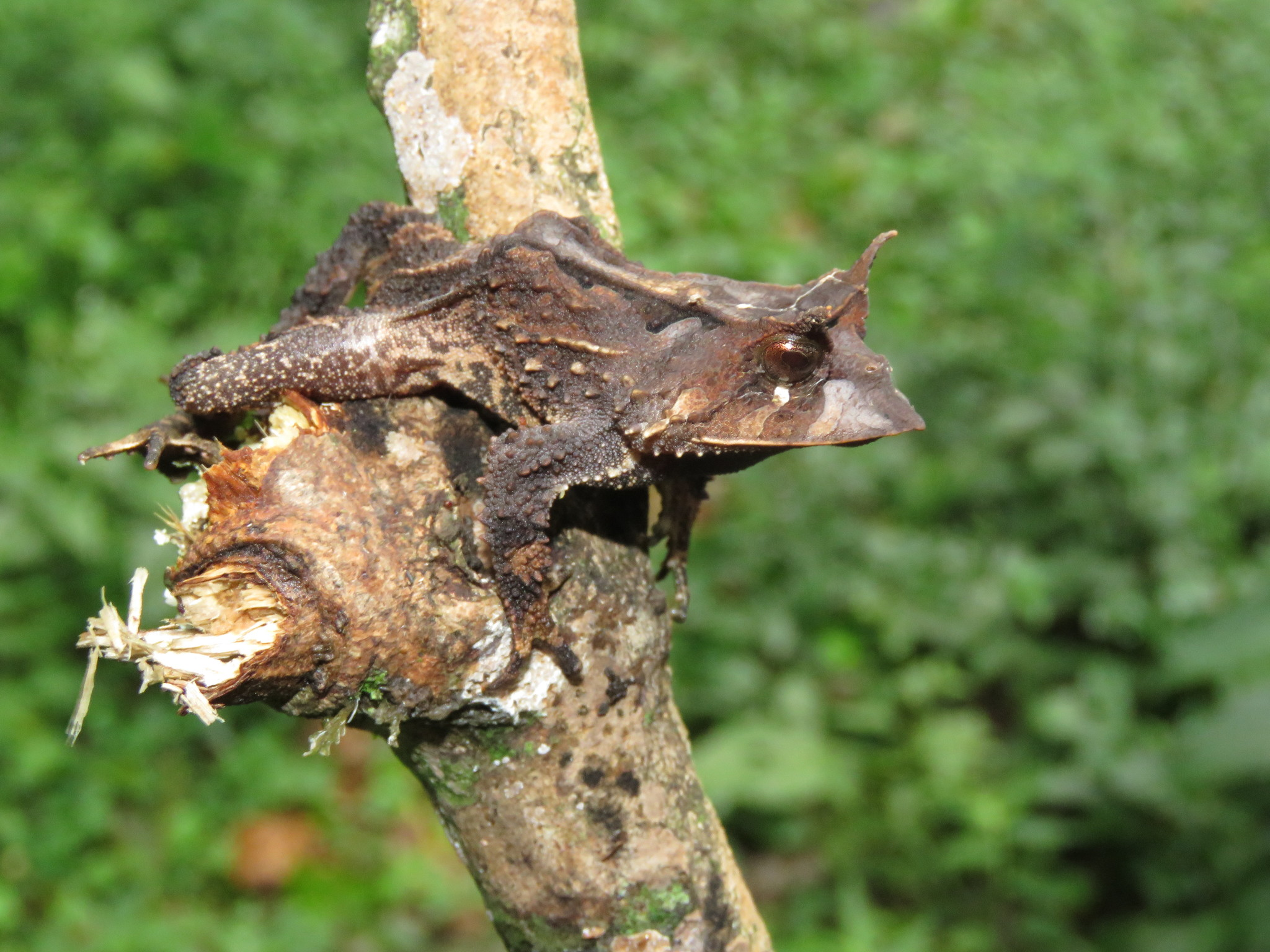

Conservation status
- Least Concern (IUCN 3.1)

Scientific classification
- Kingdom: Animalia
- Phylum: Chordata
- Class: Amphibia
- Order: Anura
- Family: Odontophrynidae
- Genus: Proceratophrys
- Species: P. appendiculata

Binomial name
- Proceratophrys appendiculata (Günther, 1873)

Synonyms
- Ceratophrys appendiculata Günther, 1873; Ceratophrys cafferi Camerano, 1879, Stombus appendiculatus Miranda-Ribeiro, 1920; Ceratophrys appendiculata Nieden, 1923; Stombus appendiculatus appendiculatus Miranda-Ribeiro, 1926; Stombus appendiculatus var. unicolor Miranda-Ribeiro, 1926; Stombus appendiculatus Reig and Limeses, 1963; Stombus appendiculatus incolor Bokermann, 1966; Proceratophrys appendiculata Lynch, 1971

= Proceratophrys appendiculata =

Species of frog

Proceratophrys appendiculata is a species of frog in the family Odontophrynidae. It is endemic to Brazil.

== Habitat ==
This frog is an obligate forest dweller. Scientists observed this frog on the leaf litter in primary and secondary forest between 500 and 1700 meters above sea level.

Scientists have reported the frog in two protected parks: Parque Nacional Da Serra Dos Orgãos and Parque Estadual Do Desengano.

== Reproduction ==
The adult frogs lay eggs in streams, where the tadpoles develop.

== Threats ==
The IUCN classifies this frog as least concern of extinction. The principal threats are habitat loss via deforestation through logging, urbanization, agriculture, and cattle grazing. Much of the remaining population lives in protected areas and areas where the mountains are too steep to be suitable for human use.
