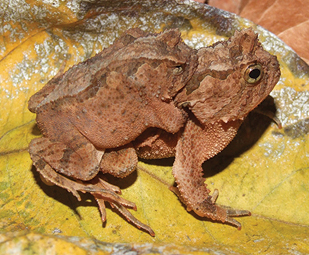
- Proceratophrys schirchi from Serra Bonita, southern Bahia

Conservation status
- Least Concern (IUCN 3.1)

Scientific classification
- Kingdom: Animalia
- Phylum: Chordata
- Class: Amphibia
- Order: Anura
- Family: Odontophrynidae
- Genus: Proceratophrys
- Species: P. schirchi

Binomial name
- Proceratophrys schirchi (Miranda-Ribeiro, 1937)

Synonyms
- Stombus schirchi Miranda-Ribeiro, 1937; Stombus precrenulatus Miranda-Ribeiro, 1937; Ceratophrys schirchi (Miranda-Ribeiro, 1937); Proceratophrys precrenulata (Miranda-Ribeiro, 1937); Proceratophrys precrenulatus (Miranda-Ribeiro, 1937)

= Proceratophrys schirchi =

Species of frog

Proceratophrys schirchi is a species of frog in the family Odontophrynidae. It is endemic to eastern Brazil and occurs in southeastern Bahia, Espírito Santo, northeastern Minas Gerais, and Rio de Janeiro states. The specific name schirchi honours Paulo F. Schirch, a Brazilian zoologist who collected the type series. Common names Santo smooth horned frog and Brazilian smooth horned frog can refer to this species, the latter specifically referring to Proceratophrys precrenulata that is now considered a junior synonym only.

== Taxonomy ==
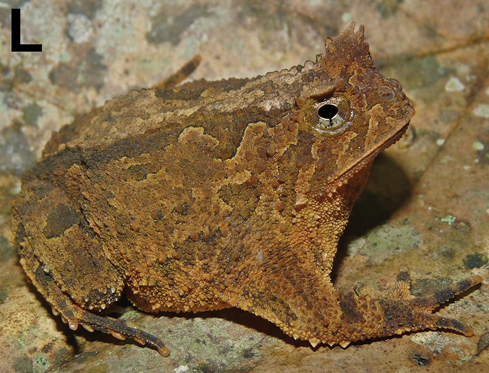
Espírito Santo, Brazil

Proceratophrys schirchi and Proceratophrys precrenulata were described by Alípio de Miranda Ribeiro in 1937 in the same paper. There has been discussions whether these two species are distinct. In 1997, Caramaschi and Ulisses argued that the distinguishing character between P. schirchi and P. precrenulata—the apparent absence of tubercles on the upper eyelids in the former—was not real but attributable to the poor preservation of the types. The type series of both taxa were collected from the same locality. This led Caramaschi and Ulisses to argue that P. schirchi and P. precrenulata are the same species, and chose P. schirchi as the valid name because the type series of P. precrenulata is lost and P. schirchi appeared first in the publication in which both were described.

== Description ==
Adult males measure 32–40 mm (1.3–1.6 in) in snout–vent length. The eyelids have a row of enlarged, pointed tubercles. The snout is truncate.

== Habitat and conservation ==
Proceratophrys schirchi occurs in primary and secondary forest at elevations below 800 m (2,600 ft); is not found outside forest. It is a leaf-litter species living on the forest floor. Breeding takes place in small forest streams. It is a common species, but habitat loss caused by agriculture, wood plantations, livestock grazing, human settlement, fire, and logging is a threat. It is found in several protected areas.
