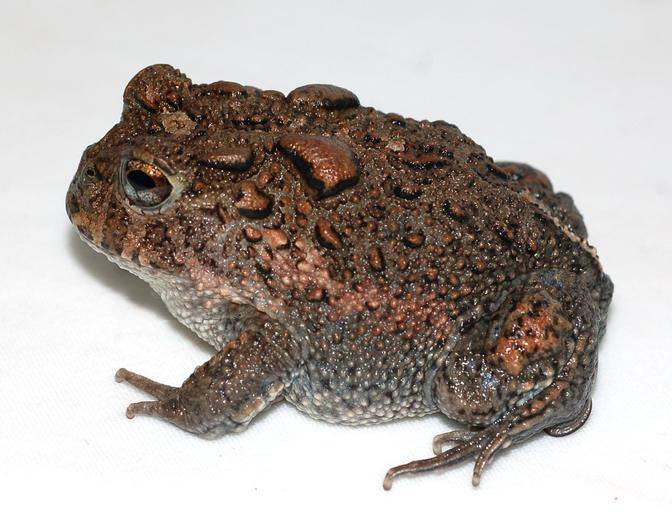

Conservation status
- Least Concern (IUCN 3.1)

Scientific classification
- Kingdom: Animalia
- Phylum: Chordata
- Class: Amphibia
- Order: Anura
- Family: Odontophrynidae
- Genus: Odontophrynus
- Species: O. cultripes

Binomial name
- Odontophrynus cultripes Reinhardt & Lütken, 1862

= Odontophrynus cultripes =

Species of frog

Odontophrynus cultripes is a species of frog in the family Odontophrynidae. It is endemic to southeastern Brazil and known from Minas Gerais, Goiás, and São Paulo states.

== Description ==
Males measure 50–60 mm (2.0–2.4 in) and females 45–70 mm (1.8–2.8 in) in snout–vent length. The snout is vertical in profile. The parotoid glands are large and ovoid. The male advertisement call is composed of a single, multi-pulsed note. This frog has prominent eyes. There is no webbed skin on the front feet. Instead, it has a shovel-shaped front toe that it uses to burrow. The dorsal surfaces of the head, back, and legs are brown in color with lighter brown color on the head and some black on the legs and back. It has large, brown warts and yellow pigmentation on the flanks. The belly is yellow with some brown. The male frog has a brown throat.

== Young ==
The male frog calls to the female frogs at night near shallow, temporary pools. This frog has an explosive breeding pattern. The female frog deposits her eggs in a gel the mud at the bottom of the pool.

The tadpole has a round body. The eyes and nose are located dorsally. The top of the body is brown with darker brown marks. The belly is clear with dark black marks.

== Habitat and conservation ==
Odontophrynus cultripes is a fossorial species that occurs in open areas, forest edges, and suburban gardens. It is an abundant species that breeds explosively in temporary pools, including huyman-made ones. Although the IUCN classifies this species as least concern, habitat loss caused by infrastructure development, agricultural activities, and livestock rearing can negatively impact the species.

The frog has been observed many protected parks: Área de Proteção Ambiental Corumbataí, Botucatu e Tejupa Perimetro Corumbataí, Área de Proteção Ambiental das Nascentes do Rio Vermelho, Área de Proteção Ambiental Jalapão, Área de Proteção Ambiental Serra do Lajeado, Área de Proteção Ambiental Sul RMBH, Parque Nacional da Chapada dos Veadeiros, and Parque Nacional de Itatiaia.
