= Scythrophrys =

Banhado frog

Conservation status
- Least Concern (IUCN 3.1)

Scientific classification
- Kingdom: Animalia
- Phylum: Chordata
- Class: Amphibia
- Order: Anura
- Family: Leptodactylidae
- Subfamily: Paratelmatobiinae
- Genus: Scythrophrys; Lynch, 1971
- Species: S. sawayae

Binomial name
- Scythrophrys sawayae (Cochran, 1953)

Synonyms
- Zachaenus sawayae Cochran, 1953

Genus of amphibians

Scythrophrys is a genus of frogs in the family Leptodactylidae. It is monotypic, being represented by the single species, Scythrophrys sawayae, commonly known as the Banhado frog, after its type locality. It is endemic to Serra do Mar in Paraná and Santa Catarina states, south-eastern Brazil. Its natural habitats are secondary and old growth forests; reproduction takes place in temporary pools. Its populations are scattered but it is locally common. It is threatened by habitat loss. This species was first described in 1953 by the American herpetologist Doris Mable Cochran whose research was focused on the herpetofauna of the West Indies and South America.

== Description ==
The Banhado frog is a small, plump frog, growing to a length of about 17 mm (0.7 in), with males being slightly smaller than females. The snout is pointed and there are pointed projections above the eyes. The limbs are slender and the digits bear small disc-shaped pads. There are three distinct colour forms; about 50% of individuals are dark brown, the rest being either green or light tan. The limbs are yellowish-brown, and there is a pale fold of skin separating the dorsal surface from the flanks.

== Ecology ==
The Banhado frog lives among the leaf litter on the forest floor. When it is stationary it is difficult to discern among the dead leaves; the shape of its body and the variability of its colouring may make it more difficult for a potential predator to learn to recognise it as prey. When disturbed, it adopts a defensive posture, thrusting its limbs stiffly outwards, thereby making itself appear larger than it actually is. In this posture and in its resemblance to a dead leaf, it is similar to Proceratophrys boiei, another frog found on the floor of Brazil's rain forests.

== Status ==
The Banhado frog is endemic to the Serra do Mar, a series of mountain ranges in southeastern Brazil, in the states of Paraná and Santa Catarina. Its typical habitat is virgin or secondary growth forest at altitudes of between 800 and 1,000 m (2,600 and 3,300 ft). It has a somewhat limited range, with an area of occupancy of probably less than 20,000 km^{2} (7,700 sq mi) and it is common in suitable habitat. Although it does not occur in any protected areas, the forests in which it lives are relatively undisturbed, and any decrease in populations is likely to be at too slow a rate to be sufficient to classify it in a more threatened category, so the International Union for Conservation of Nature has rated its conservation status as being of "least concern".
