= Proceratophrys mantiqueira =

Conservation status
- Least Concern (IUCN 3.1)

Scientific classification
- Kingdom: Animalia
- Phylum: Chordata
- Class: Amphibia
- Order: Anura
- Family: Odontophrynidae
- Genus: Proceratophrys
- Species: P. mantiqueira

Binomial name
- Proceratophrys mantiqueira Mângia, Santana, Cruz, and Feio, 2014

Species of frog

Proceratophrys mantiqueira is a species of frog in the family Odontophrynidae. It is endemic to Brazil.

== Description ==
The adult male frog measures 28.4–42.5 mm in snout-vent length and the adult female frog 36.3–54.3 mm. Unlike other frogs in its species group, it does not have a preorbital crest.

== Etymology ==
Mantiqueira is a Tupi word meaning "home of the rain."

== Habitat ==
This frog lives in forests where the tree branches come together like a roof. Scientists saw it on the dead leaves on the ground near streams. Scientists saw the frog between 600 and 1800 meters above sea level.

Scientists found the frog in two protected parks, Parque National de Itatiaia and Parque Estadual da Serra do Brigadeiro.

== Reproduction ==
The female frog deposits her eggs in temporary rivulets, where the tadpoles develop.

== Threats ==
The IUCN classifies this frog as least concern of extinction. In the past, there was mining in its habitat. There was also considerable forest conversion in favor of agriculture, livestock grazing and silviculture, but the forests that remain are largely in protected parks on mountains.
