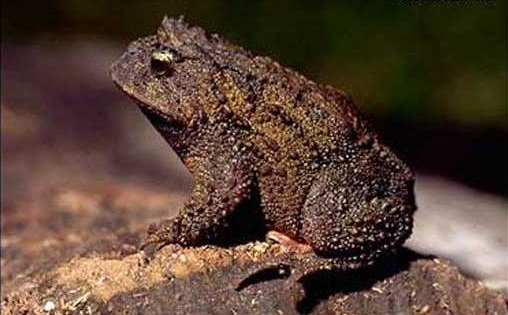
- Proceratophrys bigibbosa

Scientific classification
- Kingdom: Animalia
- Phylum: Chordata
- Class: Amphibia
- Order: Anura
- Family: Odontophrynidae
- Genus: Proceratophrys; Miranda-Ribeiro, 1920

Type species
- Proceratophrys bigibbosa Peters, 1872

= Proceratophrys =

Genus of amphibians

Proceratophrys is a genus of frogs in the family Odontophrynidae. They are found in eastern and southern Brazil, northeastern Argentina, and Paraguay, possibly into Bolivia adjacent to the Brazilian border.

== Species ==
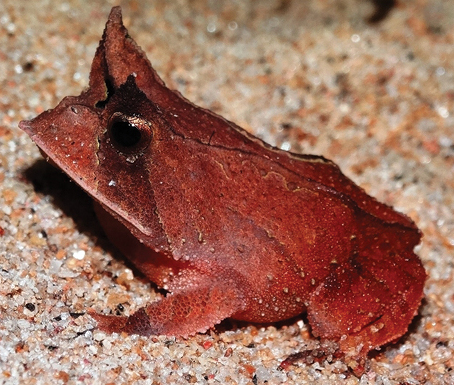
Proceratophrys laticeps

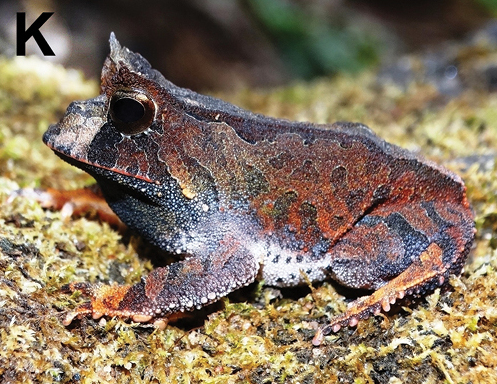
Proceratophrys paviotii

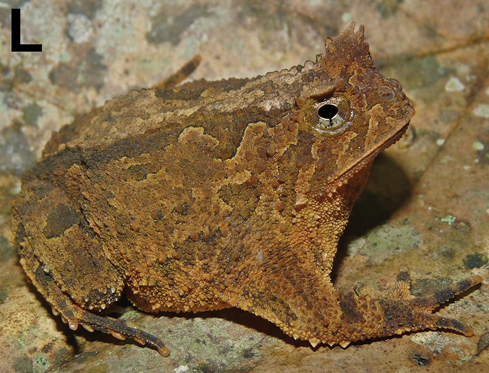
Proceratophrys schirchi

The genus contains 42 species, many of them only recently described:

- Proceratophrys appendiculata (Günther, 1873)
- Proceratophrys ararype Mângia, Koroiva, Nunes, Roberto, Ávila, Sant'Anna, Santana & Garda, 2018
- Proceratophrys avelinoi Mercadal de Barrio and Barrio, 1993
- Proceratophrys bagnoi Brandão, Caramaschi, Vaz-Silva, and Campos, 2013
- Proceratophrys belzebul Dias, Amaro, Carvahlo-e-Silva, and Rodrigues, 2013
- Proceratophrys bigibbosa (Peters, 1872)
- Proceratophrys boiei (Wied-Neuwied, 1824)
- Proceratophrys branti Brandão, Caramaschi, Vaz-Silva, and Campos, 2013
- Proceratophrys brauni Kwet and Faivovich, 2001
- Proceratophrys carranca Godinho, Moura, Lacerda, and Feio, 2013
- Proceratophrys concavitympanum Giaretta, Bernarde, and Kokubum, 2000
- Proceratophrys cristiceps (Müller, 1883)
- Proceratophrys cururu Eterovick and Sazima, 1998
- Proceratophrys dibernardoi Brandão, Caramaschi, Vaz-Silva, and Campos, 2013
- Proceratophrys gladius Mângia, Santana, Cruz, and Feio, 2014
- Proceratophrys goyana (Miranda-Ribeiro, 1937)
- Proceratophrys huntingtoni Ávila, Pansonato, and Strüssmann, 2012
- Proceratophrys itamari Mângia, Santana, Cruz, and Feio, 2014
- Proceratophrys izecksohni Dias, Amaro, Carvahlo-e-Silva, and Rodrigues, 2013
- Proceratophrys kaingang Santana, Mângia, Silva Alves Saccol, and Santos, 2021
- Proceratophrys korekore Santana, Alves da Silva, Sant’Anna, Shepard, and Mângia, 2021
- Proceratophrys laticeps Izecksohn and Peixoto, 1981
- Proceratophrys mantiqueira Mângia, Santana, Cruz, and Feio, 2014
- Proceratophrys melanopogon (Miranda-Ribeiro, 1926)
- Proceratophrys minuta Napoli, Cruz, Abreu, and Del Grande, 2011
- Proceratophrys moehringi Weygoldt and Peixoto, 1985
- Proceratophrys moratoi (Jim and Caramaschi, 1980)
- Proceratophrys palustris Giaretta and Sazima, 1993
- Proceratophrys paviotii Cruz, Prado, and Izecksohn, 2005
- Proceratophrys phyllostomus Izecksohn, Cruz, and Peixoto, 1999
- Proceratophrys pombali Mângia, Santana, Cruz, and Feio, 2014
- Proceratophrys redacta Teixeira, Amaro, Recoder, Vechio, and Rodrigues, 2012
- Proceratophrys renalis (Miranda-Ribeiro, 1920)
- Proceratophrys rondonae Prado and Pombal, 2008
- Proceratophrys rotundipalpebra Martins and Giaretta, 2013
- Proceratophrys salvatori (Caramaschi, 1996)
- Proceratophrys sanctaritae Cruz and Napoli, 2010
- Proceratophrys schirchi (Miranda-Ribeiro, 1937)
- Proceratophrys strussmannae Ávila, Kawashita-Ribeiro, and Morais, 2011
- Proceratophrys subguttata Izecksohn, Cruz, and Peixoto, 1999
- Proceratophrys tupinamba Prado and Pombal, 2008
- Proceratophrys vielliardi Martins and Giaretta, 2011
