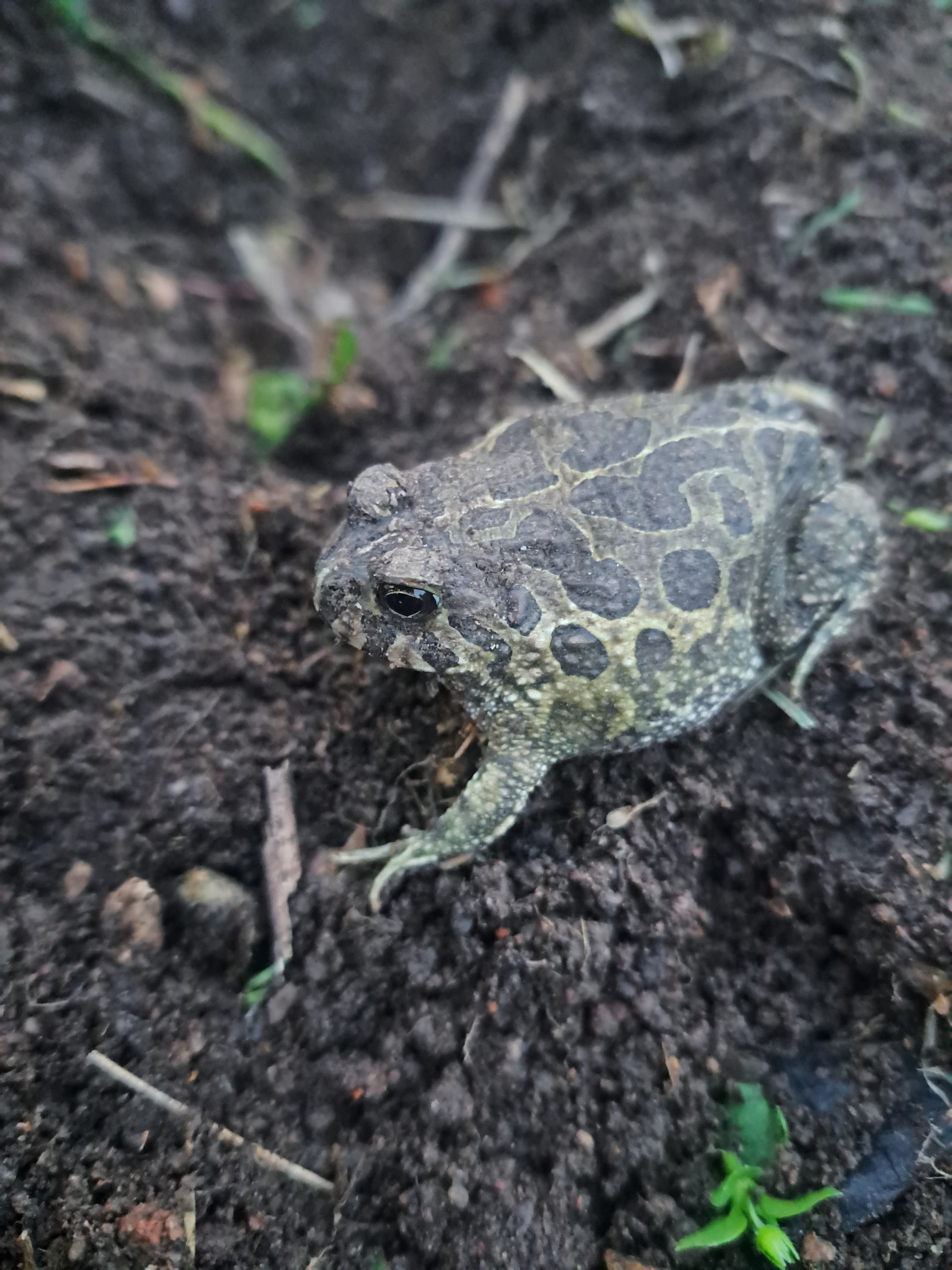

Conservation status
- Critically Endangered (IUCN 3.1)

Scientific classification
- Kingdom: Animalia
- Phylum: Chordata
- Class: Amphibia
- Order: Anura
- Family: Odontophrynidae
- Genus: Proceratophrys
- Species: P. palustris

Binomial name
- Proceratophrys palustris Giaretta & Sazima, 1993

= Proceratophrys palustris =

Species of frog

Proceratophrys palustris is a species of frog in the family Odontophrynidae. It is endemic to Brazil.

== Habitat ==
This terrestrial, nocturnal frog lives in gallery forests. Scientists observed it between 1100 and 1500 meters above sea level.

The frog's range includes two protected areas, Parque Natural Municipal Da Serra De São Domingos and Parque Estadual Águas Da Prataó, but scientists have not reported the frog there.

== Reproduction ==
This frog reproduces in streams with muddy bottoms.

== Threats ==
The IUCN classifies this frog as critically endangered. The principal threats are habitat loss. The area has been heavily exploited and there is only some forest remaining. People cut down forest for timber and in favor of urbanization, agriculture, sericulture, and livestock cultivation.
