= Odontophrynus cordobae =

Conservation status
- Least Concern (IUCN 3.1)

Scientific classification
- Kingdom: Animalia
- Phylum: Chordata
- Class: Amphibia
- Order: Anura
- Family: Odontophrynidae
- Genus: Odontophrynus
- Species: O. cordobae

Binomial name
- Odontophrynus cordobae Martino and Sinsch, 2002

Species of frog

Odontophrynus cordobae (in Spanish: escuercito) is a species of frog in the family Odontophrynidae. It is endemic to northern Argentina and known from Córdoba and Santiago del Estero Provinces. This diploid species was separated from the tetraploid Odontophrynus americanus in 2002.

== Habitat ==
It inhabits montane grasslands and forests and can be found under rocks in Andean forests and grasslands. It is common in suitable habitats. Scientists observed the frog between 600 and 1600 meters above sea level.

Scientists have reported the frog in one protected park: Pampa de Achala Regional Hydrological Reserve.

== Reproduction ==
Reproduction takes place in permanent mountain streams. The tadpoles require more than a year to reach metamorphosis.

== Threats ==
The IUCN classifies this species as least concern of extinction. It tolerates substantial habitat modification but habitat destruction for wood extraction and cattle ranching may threaten it.

== Original description ==
- Martino; Sinsch (2002). "No title given". J. Zool. 257. London: 78.
