= Christian Frederik Lütken =

Danish zoologist (1827–1901)

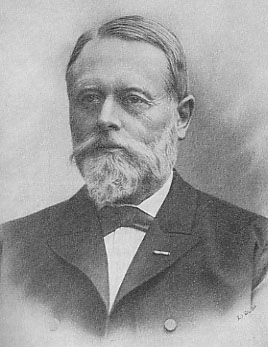
- Born: 7 October 1827; Sorø, Denmark
- Died: 6 February 1901 (aged 73)
- Scientific career
- Fields: Zoology
- Author abbrev. (zoology): Lütken

Christian Frederik Lütken (Danish: [ˈkʰʁestjæn ˈfʁeðˀʁek ˈlytkʰən̩, ˈkʰʁæstjæn ˈfʁæðˀʁæk -]; 7 October 1827, in Sorø – 6 February 1901), was a Danish zoologist and naturalist.

In 1852, he resigned his commission as a lieutenant with the Danish army, and earned his master's degree in sciences the following year. Afterwards, he served as an assistant to Japetus Steenstrup (1813–1897) at the University of Copenhagen Zoological Museum, at the time an independent institution, now part of the Natural History Museum of Denmark. Following Steenstrup's retirement in 1885, he became a professor of zoology and director of the zoological museum. As he grew older, he suffered from physical infirmities and during the last year of his life, he was stricken by paralysis. In 1899, Hector Frederik Estrup Jungersen (1854–1917) was chosen as Lütken's successor at Copenhagen.

Lütken specialized in marine zoology, being highly regarded for his research of echinoderms. He described a number of marine organisms, and has numerous species named after him, such as Paulicea luetkeni, Platystoma luetkeni, Ophiactis luetkeni and Oneirodes luetkeni.

With Johannes Theodor Reinhardt (1816–1882), he published a book on Brazilian amphibians and reptiles titled Bidrag til Kundskab om Brasiliens Padder og Krybdyr. With Reinhardt, he described several herpetological species, including the Little-scaled least gecko, the Rio Grande escuerzo and Saint Vincent's bush anole.

== Partial list of publications ==
- 1859 : Udsikt over de saakaldte vingeløse, ikke flyvende, fugles bygning og liv - Tidsskrift for populære fremstillinger af Naturvidenskaben.
- 1864 : Bidrag til Kundskab om Echinidern - (contributions to the knowledge of echinoderms).
- 1877 : Korte bidrag til nordisk Ichthyographi. I. Foreløbige Meddelelser om nordiske Ulkefiske (Cottoidei). Vidensk. Medd. Naturh. Foren. Kjøbenhavn, 1876–77 : 355–388, 72–98.
- 1892 : Spolia Atlantica.
- 1898 : The ichthyological results. Danish Ingolf Expedition, II. Copenhagen : 215–254, Pl. 1–4.
- 1899 : The Ophiuridæ - (on Ophiuridae), published in English in 1899.
- A collection of his popular lectures at the Danish Natural History Society was published in Skildringer af Dyrelivet i Fortid og Nutid (Descriptions of Animal Life in Past and Present Times) (Copenhagen: P.G. Philipsens Forlag, 1880).

== Taxon named in his honor ==
He described a number of marine organisms, and has numerous species named after him, such as

- The Gilded Catfish Paulicea luetkeni,
- The Fly Platystoma luetkeni,
- The Brittle Star Ophiactis luetkeni Marktanner-Turneretscher, 1887 and
- The fish Oneirodes luetkeni.(Regan, 1925)
- Diaphus luetkeni (A. B. Brauer, 1904), Luetken's lanternfish, is a species of lanternfish found worldwide.
- Hypostomus luetkeni is a species of catfish in the family Loricariidae. It is native to South America, where it occurs in the state of Rio de Janeiro in Brazil.

== Taxon described by him ==
- See Category:Taxa named by Christian Frederik Lütken
