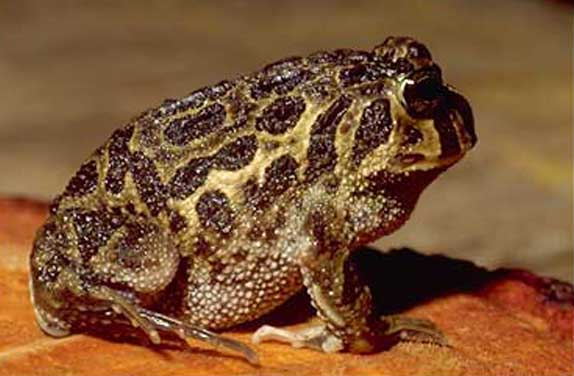

Conservation status
- Least Concern (IUCN 3.1)

Scientific classification
- Kingdom: Animalia
- Phylum: Chordata
- Class: Amphibia
- Order: Anura
- Family: Odontophrynidae
- Genus: Odontophrynus
- Species: O. americanus

Binomial name
- Odontophrynus americanus (Duméril and Bibron, 1841)

Synonyms
- Pyxicephalus americanus Duméril and Bibron, 1841; Tomopterna americana Fitzinger, 1843; Ceratophrys americana Boulenger, 1882; Ceratophrys occidentalis Berg, 1896; Odontophrynus americanus Miranda-Ribeiro, 1920; Odontophrynus occidentalis Müller, 1934; Odontophrynus barrioi Cei, Ruiz, and Beçak, 1982; Odontophrynus achalensis di Tada, Barla, Martori, and Cei, 1984

= Odontophrynus americanus =

Species of frog

Odontophrynus americanus (common names: common lesser escuercito, American ground frog) is a species of frog in the family Odontophrynidae. It is found in central and northern Argentina, Uruguay, southern Brazil, and southern Paraguay. It is tetraploid; diploid populations have been described as a new species, Odontophrynus cordobae.

== Description ==
The adult male frog measures 42.2 mm in snout-vent length and the adult female frog 44.6 mm. The head is wider than it is long. It has claws on its forefeet and webbed skin on its hind feet. The skin of the dorsum is light brown with darker brown marks surrounded in black. Sometimes there is some red coloration. The belly is off-white with some brown mottling. The adult male frog has a dark gray throat.

== Habitat ==
Scientists observed this frog in grassy areas, Atlantic forest, Cerrado biomes, and Pampa biomes. It seems to tolerate human disturbance well and has been found near farms and towns. Scientists observed the frog between 0 and 2000 meters above sea level.

Scientists have seen the frog in many protected parks, uncluding Parque Estadual do Turvo, Área de Proteção Ambiental Sapucai-Mirim, Área de Proteção Ambiental Campos do Jordão, and Floresta Estadual de Assis in Brazil.

== Reproduction ==
During the breeding season, these frogs are found at shallow, temporary ponds and flooded areas. This frog is an explosive breeder. Males can be heard calling at night from the edge of, or from within the water. The female frog deposits her eggs in the mud at the bottom of the pool.

The tadpole has a globular body with eyes located dorsally. It has complex mouthparts, including papillae and a beak. The top and sides of the body are brown in color and its ventral area is translucent. The tadpoles are benthic and feed on algae and plant detritus.

The tadpoles develop into frogs in 7-9 months.

== Threats ==
The IUCN classifies this species as least concern of extinction. The tadpoles are preyed upon my many animals, including invasive Rana catesbeiana. The animals hide by digging into the ground with their legs. Human beings also catch the frog to eat and to sell as part of the international pet trade.

== Original description ==
- Duméril, A. M. C.; Bibron, G. (1841). "Erpétologie Genérale ou Histoire Naturelle Complète des Reptiles". Librarie Enclyclopedique de Roret. 8. Paris.
