= Hypostomus luetkeni =

Scientific classification
- Kingdom: Animalia
- Phylum: Chordata
- Class: Actinopterygii
- Division: Teleostei
- Order: Siluriformes
- Family: Loricariidae
- Genus: Hypostomus
- Species: H. luetkeni

Binomial name
- Hypostomus luetkeni (Steindachner, 1877)

Synonyms
- Plecostomus luetkeni

Species of fish

Hypostomus luetkeni is a species of catfish in the family Loricariidae. It is native to South America, where it occurs in the state of Rio de Janeiro in Brazil. The species reaches 25.4 cm (10 inches) SL.

== Etymology ==
The fish is named in honor of Danish zoologist Christian Frederik Lütken (1827–1901).
