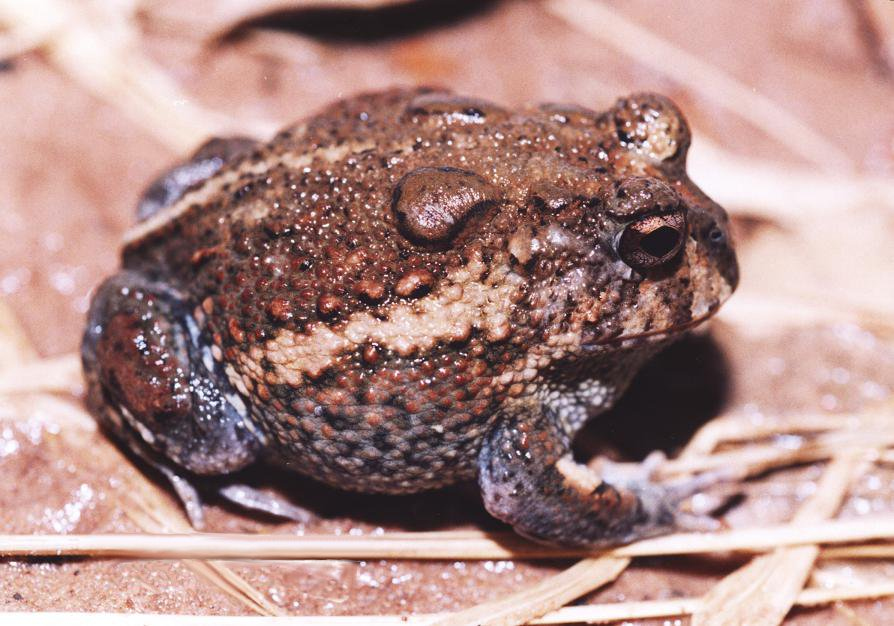
- Odontophrynus cultripes

Scientific classification
- Kingdom: Animalia
- Phylum: Chordata
- Class: Amphibia
- Order: Anura
- Superfamily: Hyloidea
- Family: Odontophrynidae; Lynch, 1969

Diversity
- 3 genera (see text)

= Odontophrynidae =

Family of amphibians

The Odontophrynidae are a family of frogs from southern and eastern South America. This family was first established in 1969 as the tribe Odontophrynini within the (then) very large family Leptodactylidae. Molecular phylogenetics analyses prompted the move of this group to the Cycloramphidae in 2006, before they became recognized as their own family Odontophrynidae in 2011.

== Genera ==
The genera with 52 species are:

- Macrogenioglottus Carvalho, 1946 (one species)
- Odontophrynus Reinhardt and Lütken, 1862 (11 species)
- Proceratophrys Miranda-Ribeiro, 1920 (40 species)
