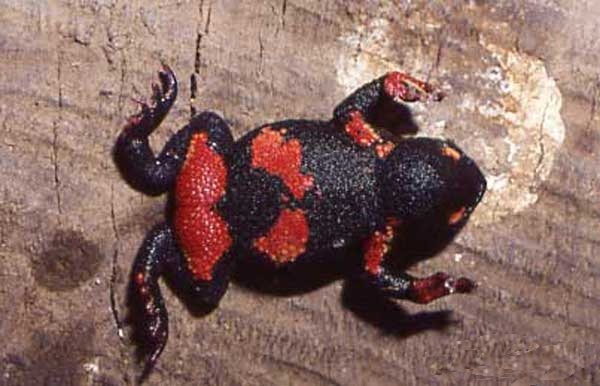

Conservation status
- Least Concern (IUCN 3.1)

Scientific classification
- Kingdom: Animalia
- Phylum: Chordata
- Class: Amphibia
- Order: Anura
- Family: Bufonidae
- Genus: Melanophryniscus
- Species: M. atroluteus

Binomial name
- Melanophryniscus atroluteus (Miranda-Ribeiro, 1920)

Synonyms
- Atelopus atro-luteus Miranda-Ribeiro, 1920; Melanophryniscus stelzneri atroluteus – Gallardo, 1961

= Melanophryniscus atroluteus =

Species of amphibian

Melanophryniscus atroluteus is a species of toad in the family Bufonidae. It is found in northeastern Argentina, Uruguay, southern Paraguay, and southern Brazil (Rio Grande do Sul, presumably also Santa Catarina). While in the past it was considered a subspecies of Melanophryniscus stelzneri, it might rather be conspecific with Melanophryniscus montevidensis. Common name Uruguay redbelly toad (also spelled Uruguay red belly toad) has been coined for it.

== Description ==
Males can reach 25 mm (1.0 in) and females 29 mm (1.1 in) in snout–vent length, although reported lengths are commonly slightly smaller. Skin is strongly granular. The dorsum is uniformly black, without blotches, while the belly is black and has red and/or yellow blotches. The throat is dark. Webbing is poorly developed.

== Behavior ==
When threatened, this species exhibits the Unkenreflex behavior.

== Habitat and conservation ==
Melanophryniscus atroluteus occurs in grasslands at elevations up to 1,200 m (3,900 ft). Breeding is explosive and takes place in temporary pools and agricultural ditches.

In parts of its range (Argentina and Uruguay,), M. atroluteus is abundant during the breeding, but it is rare or uncommon elsewhere. It can occur in substantially disturbed habitats, but not in areas with intensive cattle activities. It is threatened by pine and Eucalyptus plantations and by drainage of wetlands. Pet trade might also become a threat. It does not appear to occur in any larger protected areas.
