= Paraná Plateau =

The Paraná Plateau is part of the Brazilian Highlands which covers parts of southern Brazil, northern Argentina and eastern Paraguay. The plateau reaches a height of 1,300 m and stands on a layer of basalt with a thickness of 2,000 m. Most of the water from the plateau flows into the Río de la Plata estuary via the Paraná and Paraguay rivers.

Iguazu Falls is located on the western edge of the plateau. Its southwestern edge is marked by the Itaimbezinho and Fortaleza canyons.
