= Serra Geral National Park =

National park in Brazil

- Parque Nacional da Serra Geral
- IUCN category II (national park)
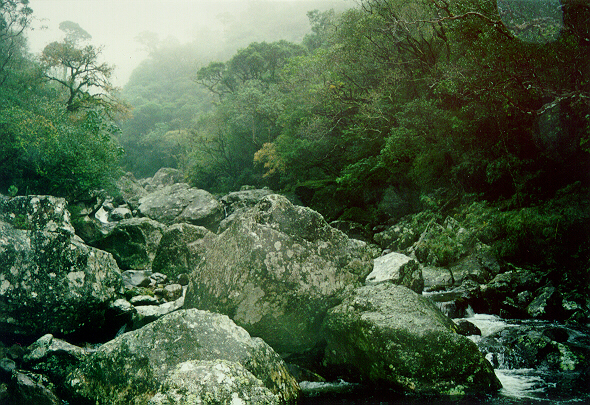
- The Fortaleza canyon in the national park

- Location within Brazil
- Nearest city: Criciúma, Santa Catarina
- Coordinates: 29°06′50″S 49°58′52″W
- Designation: National park
- Administrator: ICMBio

Serra Geral National Park (Portuguese: Parque Nacional da Serra Geral) is a national park in the states of Rio Grande do Sul and Santa Catarina, Brazil.

== Location ==
Serra Geral National Park is in the Atlantic Forest biome. It covers 17,302 hectares (42,750 acres). The park was created by decree 531 of 21 May 1992, and is administered by the Chico Mendes Institute for Biodiversity Conservation. The park covers parts of the municipalities of Cambará do Sul in Rio Grande do Sul and of Jacinto Machado and Praia Grande in Santa Catarina. It is made up of two separate sections adjacent to Aparados da Serra National Park.

== Environment ==
The Campos Gerais plateau region has a gently undulating topography with heights ranging from 900 to 1,200 metres (3,000 to 3,900 ft) above sea level. The park includes part of the southeast of the plateau and the escarpment between this plateau and the coastal plain. Altitudes range from 100 to 1,112 metres (328 to 3,648 ft) above sea level. Average annual rainfall is 1,800 millimetres (71 in). Temperatures range from 0 to 36 °C (32 to 97 °F), with an average of 18 °C (64 °F).

Vegetation includes dry meadows, peat fields, cloud forests, mixed rainforests, dense submontane and montane rainforests, and lowland rainforests. There is a wide variety of endemic species of flora. Endemic fauna include Elachistocleis erythrogaster, Melanophryniscus cambaraensis, Thoropa saxatilis, black-and-white monjita (Xolmis dominicanus), Xanthopsar flavus, Scytalopus iraiensis, Limnornis rectirostris, and Amazona pretrei.

== Conservation ==
The park is classified as IUCN protected area category II (national park). It has the objectives of preserving natural ecosystems of great ecological relevance and scenic beauty, enabling scientific research, environmental education, outdoor recreation, and eco-tourism. Protected species in the park include cougar (Puma concolor), southern tigrina (Leopardus guttulus), margay (Leopardus wiedii), vinaceous-breasted amazon (Amazona vinacea), red-spectacled amazon (Amazona pretrei), Chaco eagle (Buteogallus coronatus), the toad Melanophryniscus macrogranulosus, and the fish Mimagoniates rheocharis.

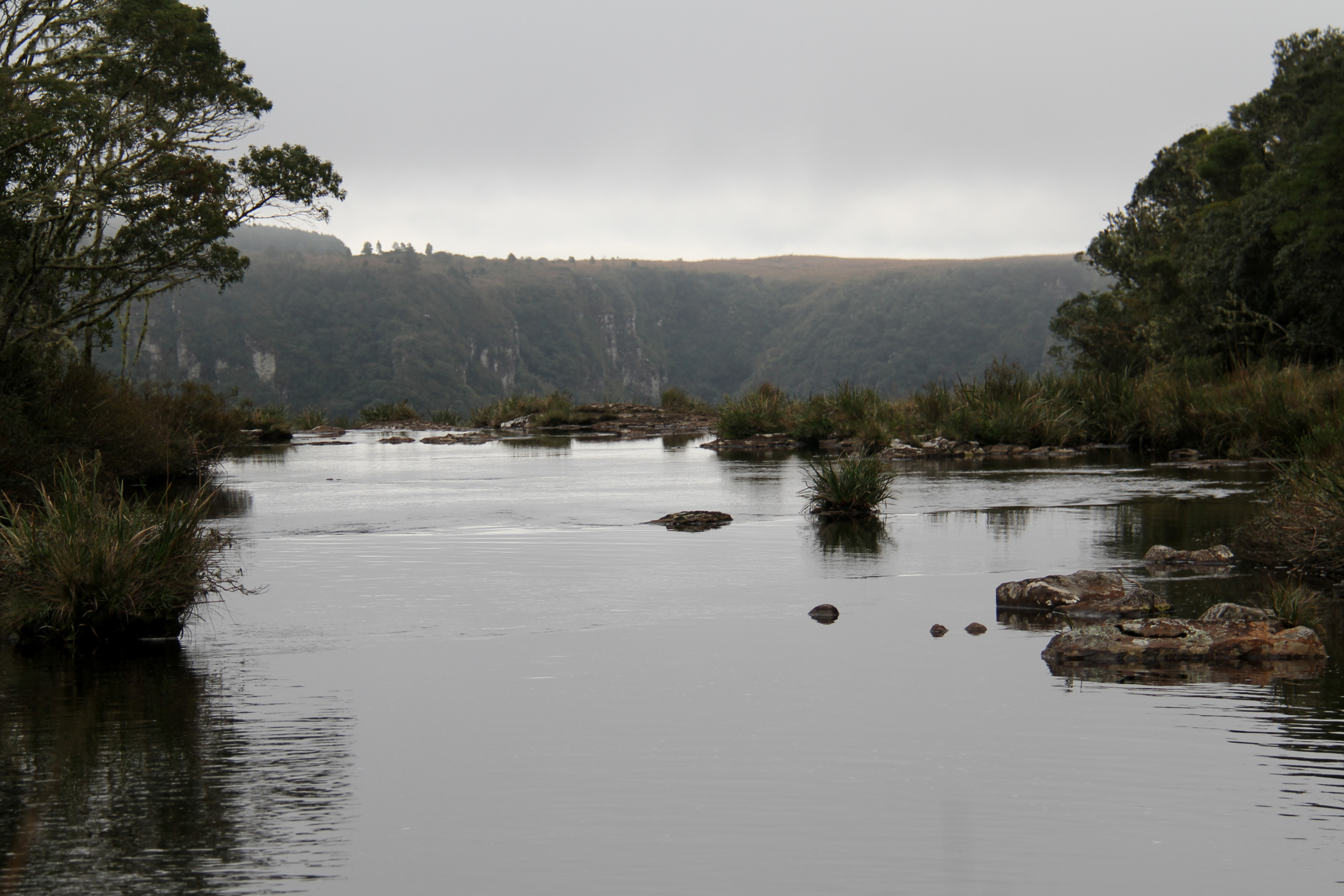

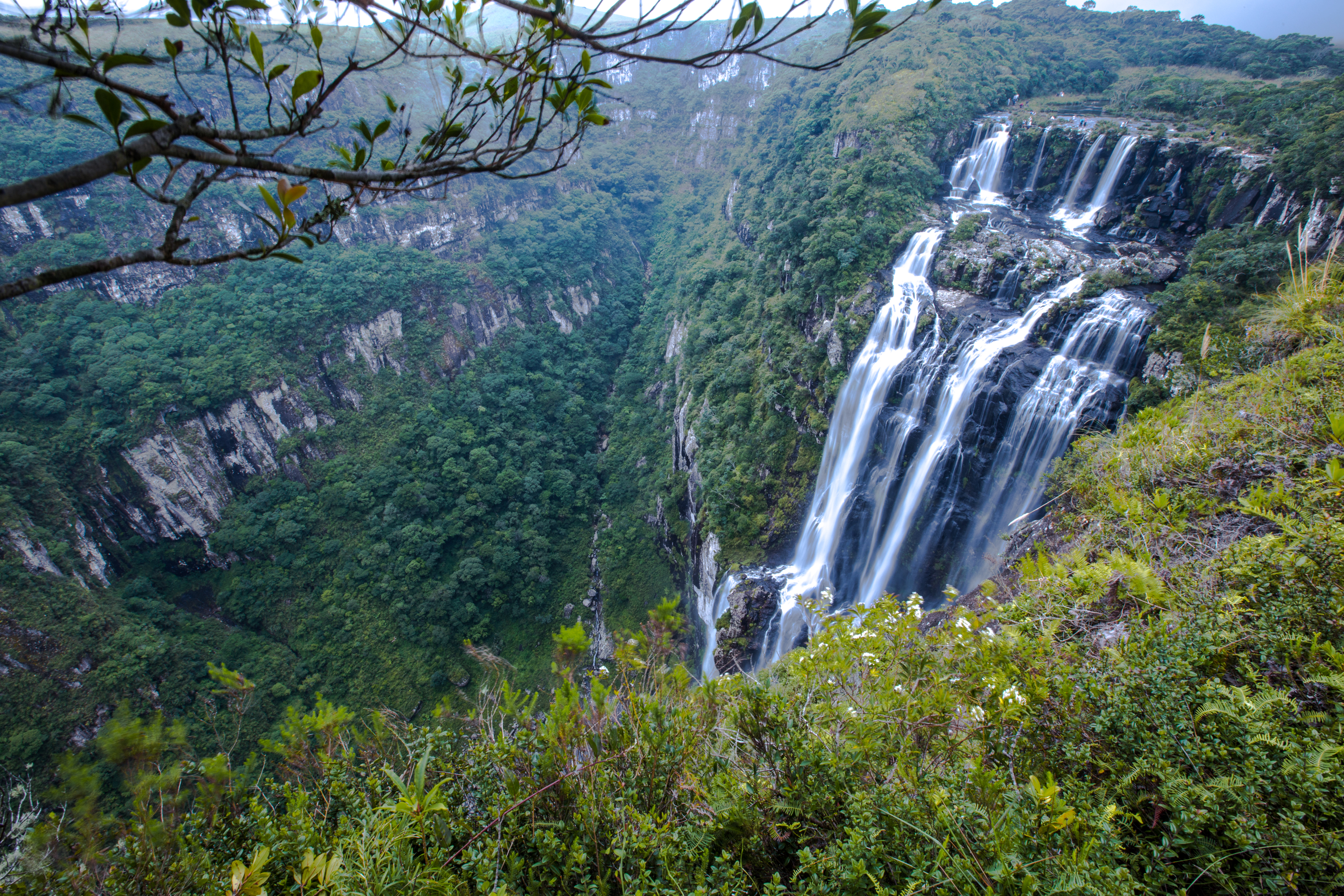
Tigre preto waterfall

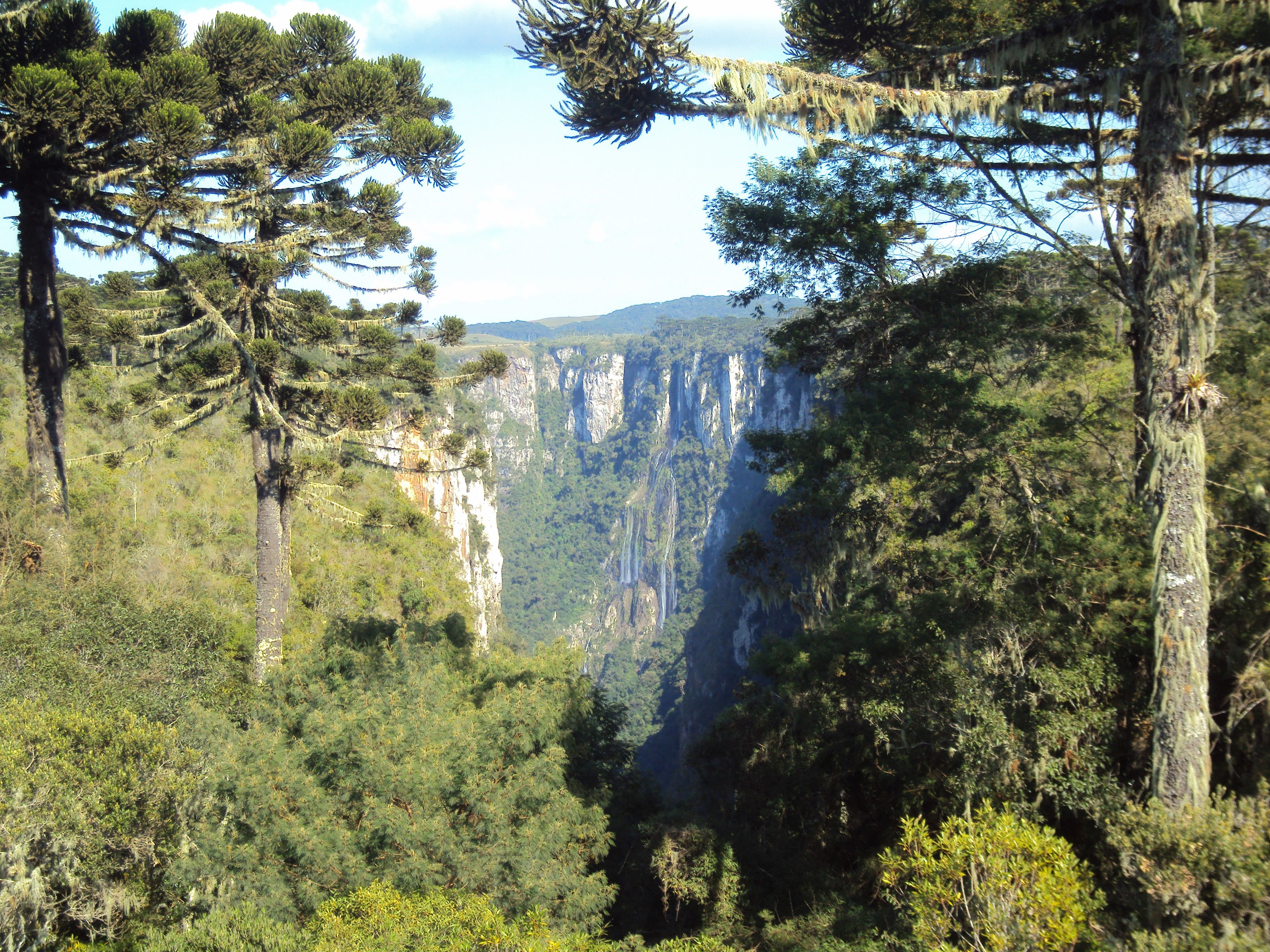
Itaimbezinho canyon

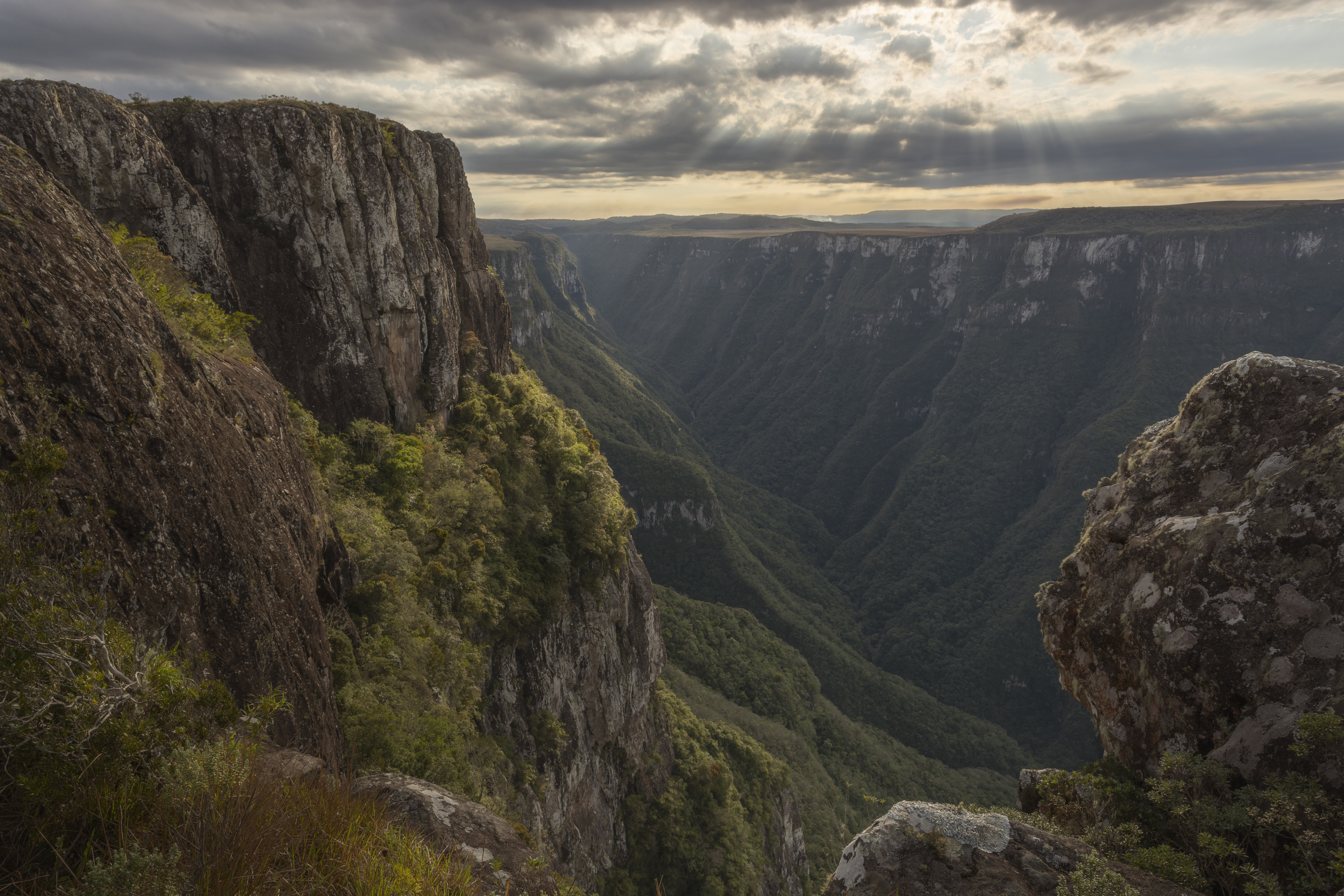
Fortaleza dos Aparados

== Sources ==
- Parna de Serra Geral (in Portuguese), Chico Mendes Institute for Biodiversity Conservation, archived from the original on 2019-03-22
- Unidade de Conservação: Parque Nacional da Serra Geral (in Portuguese), MMA: Ministério do Meio Ambiente
