= Jean Rolt =

Brazilian footballer

Personal information
- Full name: Jean de Oliveira da Rolt
- Date of birth: 12 May 1981 (age 45)
- Place of birth: Jacinto Machado, Brazil
- Height: 1.85 m (6 ft 1 in)
- Position: Centre-back

Senior career*
Years	Team	Apps	(Gls)
2001	Próspera		
2002	Tiradentes-SC		
2002–2003	Criciúma		
2003–2004	CA Lages		
2005	Brasiliense		
2005	Marcílio Dias		
2006–2007	Vitória		
2007–2010	Ponte Preta		
2009	→ São Paulo (loan)	6	(1)
2010–2011	São Caetano		
2012	Al-Sailiya		
2012–2013	Náutico		
- * Club domestic league appearances and goals as of 29 January 2024

Jean Rolt (born 12 May 1981), is a Brazilian former professional footballer who played as a centre-back.

== Career ==
Born in Santa Catarina, Jean began his career at Próspera, in Criciúma. He played for other teams in the state, for Brasiliense and Vitória, until arriving at Ponte Preta, the club where he spent most of his career. In 2009, he was loaned to São Paulo and added "Rolt" to his name to differentiate himself from midfielder Jean. He did not establish himself at the club and made just 6 appearances, scoring one goal. He also played for São Caetano, Al-Sailiya and Náutico, where he ended his career.
