= Melanophryniscus krauczuki =

Conservation status
- Least Concern (IUCN 3.1)

Scientific classification
- Kingdom: Animalia
- Phylum: Chordata
- Class: Amphibia
- Order: Anura
- Family: Bufonidae
- Genus: Melanophryniscus
- Species: M. krauczuki

Binomial name
- Melanophryniscus krauczuki Baldo and Basso, 2004

Species of amphibian

Melanophryniscus krauczuki is a species of toads in the family Bufonidae. It is found in the Misiones Province in northeastern Argentina and the Itapúa Department in the adjacent Paraguay. The specific name krauczuki honors naturalist and ornithologist Ernesto Krauczuk. Common name Krauczuk's redbelly toad has been proposed for this species.

== Description ==
Adult males measure 18–23 mm (0.7–0.9 in) and adult females 21–24 mm (0.8–0.9 in) in snout–vent length. The body is stout. The snout is short. No tympanum is visible. The fingers are short and slightly webbed. The toes are partially webbed. Skin is dorsally rugose and scattered with blunt, rounded warts that are tipped with one or more keratinized spinules. Dorsal coloration ranges from light brown to dark brown, sometimes with a lighter scapular area bot otherwise uniform. The belly is dark brown with irregular orange spots that range from being very small to large and covering most of the belly. Males have a subgular vocal sac.

== Habitat and conservation ==
Melanophryniscus krauczuki occurs in wet tropical grasslands with rocky soils and in scattered forests at elevations of 125–165 m (410–541 ft) above sea level. It is diurnal. Breeding is explosive and takes place in small, shallow, temporary streams running over basaltic beds.

This species is abundant during breeding events, albeit somewhat difficult to spot because of its cryptic coloration. The overall population is believed to be stable. It can locally be threatened by urbanization and hydroelectric dams. It occurs in Fachinal Provincial Park and Puerto San Juan Private Reserve (Argentina).
