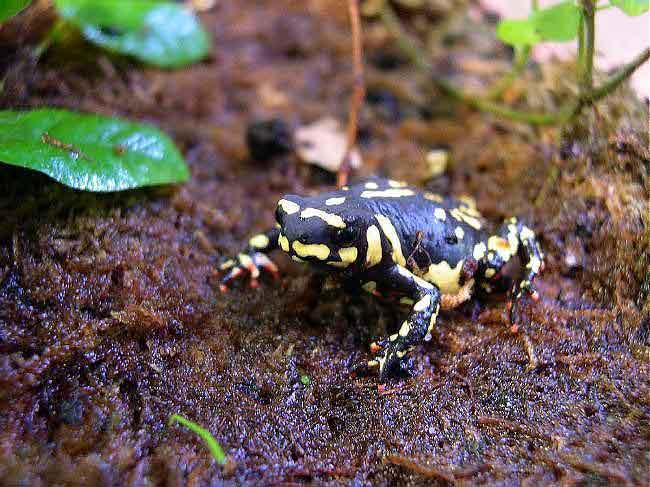
- The name bumble bee toad comes from their distinct black and yellow pattern.

Conservation status
- Least Concern (IUCN 3.1)

Scientific classification
- Kingdom: Animalia
- Phylum: Chordata
- Class: Amphibia
- Order: Anura
- Family: Bufonidae
- Genus: Melanophryniscus
- Species: M. stelzneri

Binomial name
- Melanophryniscus stelzneri (Weyenbergh, 1875)

Synonyms
- Phryniscus stelzneri Weyenbergh, 1875; Atelopus stelzneri –Boulenger, 1894; Bufo stelzneri –Noble, 1922; Dendrophryniscus stelzneri –Noble, 1926

= Melanophryniscus stelzneri =

Species of amphibian

Melanophryniscus stelzneri, commonly known as the redbelly toad, bumble bee toad (Note: Many different common names are used in pet trade, and it is not always clear to exactly which species they refer to.) or yellow and black walking toad, is a species of toad in the family Bufonidae which is endemic to Argentina. It is present in the pet trade.

== Etymology ==
The specific name stelzneri honors Alfred Wilhelm Stelzner, a German geologist who spent some time in Argentina.

== Taxonomy and subspecies ==
Melanophryniscus stelzneri was originally described in 1875. Currently two subspecies are recognized: Melanophryniscus stelzneri stelzneri and Melanophryniscus stelzneri spegazzinii Gallardo, 1961. Other former subspecies are now considered full species, namely Melanophryniscus dorsalis and Melanophryniscus fulvoguttatus.

== Description ==
Melanophryniscus stelzneri grows to about 3.8 cm (1.5 in), with females typically being larger than males.

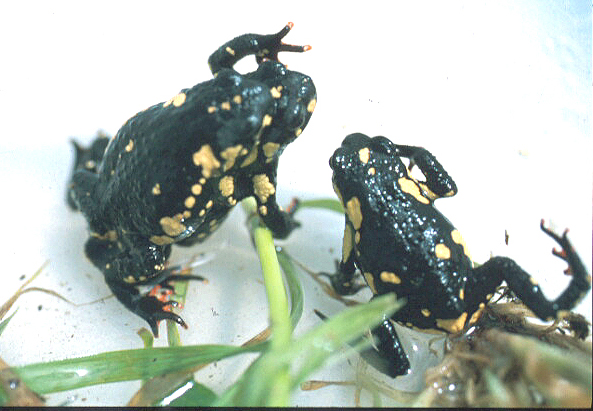
A pair of M. stelzneri with visibly red toes and high contrast black and yellow dorsal patterns.

== Distribution andhabitat ==
They were first discovered in Córdoba, Argentina. They are currently known from the Córdoba, San Luis, and Salta Provinces of Argentina. Their range may also extend into Bolivia. They occur in grasslands with rocky outcrops. Reproduction takes place in shallow ponds, streams, bogs, and even roadside ditches.

== Diet and toxicity ==
Melanophryniscus are toxic in the wild. Their natural diet is made up of mites and ants. It is believed that the toxins are created from alkaloids found in their natural diet. The brightly colored pattern is an example of aposematism. In captivity, they become non-toxic.
