= Melanophryniscus peritus =

Conservation status
- Critically endangered, possibly extinct (IUCN 3.1)

Scientific classification
- Kingdom: Animalia
- Phylum: Chordata
- Class: Amphibia
- Order: Anura
- Family: Bufonidae
- Genus: Melanophryniscus
- Species: M. peritus

Binomial name
- Melanophryniscus peritus Caramaschi and Cruz, 2011
- Melanophryniscus peritus is only known from Pico do Selado in Minas Gerais

Species of amphibian

Melanophryniscus peritus is a species of frog in the family Bufonidae. It is only known from a single specimen collected in 1953, and may be extinct.

== Taxonomy ==
Melanophryniscus peritus was described in 2011 by Ulisses Caramaschi and Carlos Alberto Gonçalves da Cruz. Originally, it was placed in the Melanophryniscus tumifrons group. The specific name, peritus, is from the Latin verb pereo, meaning to vanish or disappear. It was given to reflect the species' status.

== Description ==
The holotype and only known specimen was a female 39.3 mm long (SVL), a medium size for the genus. It also had a wide head, dark brown coloration on its dorsal side, and a lighter brown underside.

== Habitat and distribution ==
The species is only known from its type locality, Pico do Selado in the Mantiqueira mountain range of southeastern Brazil at about 1,800–2,000 m (5,900–6,600 ft) above sea level. This is further north than the majority of members in the Melanophryniscus tumifrons group. Based on the activities of other members of the genus, Melanophryniscus peritus is believed to inhabit small ponds, flooded areas near rivulets, and bromeliads.

== History ==
The only known specimen of Melanophryniscus peritus was collected on November 4, 1953 by German-Brazilian naturalist Helmut Sick. Multiple surveys of the species' known range have failed to uncover any more individuals, and it is listed as "critically endangered" and possibly extinct. It's believed that habitat loss led to the species' decline.
