= Melanophryniscus pachyrhynus =

Conservation status
- Data Deficient (IUCN 3.1)

Scientific classification
- Kingdom: Animalia
- Phylum: Chordata
- Class: Amphibia
- Order: Anura
- Family: Bufonidae
- Genus: Melanophryniscus
- Species: M. pachyrhynus

Binomial name
- Melanophryniscus pachyrhynus (Miranda-Ribeiro, 1920)

Synonyms
- Atelopus pachyrhynus Miranda-Ribeiro, 1920; Melanophryniscus orejasmirandai Prigioni and Langone, 1987

Species of amphibian

Melanophryniscus pachyrhynus is a species of toad in the family Bufonidae. It is known from São Lourenço do Sul in southern Brazil and from Uruguay. Populations in Uruguay were until recently considered a different species (Melanophryniscus orejasmirandai) and assessed as being vulnerable.

Its natural habitats are subtropical or tropical seasonally wet or flooded lowland grassland, intermittent freshwater lakes, and intermittent freshwater marshes. It is threatened by habitat loss.
