= Fortaleza Canyon =

Canyon in Serra Geral National Park, Brazil

Coordinates: 29°03′46″S 49°57′23″W

Fortaleza Canyon is a canyon located in Serra Geral National Park in Cambará do Sul, Rio Grande do Sul, Brazil.

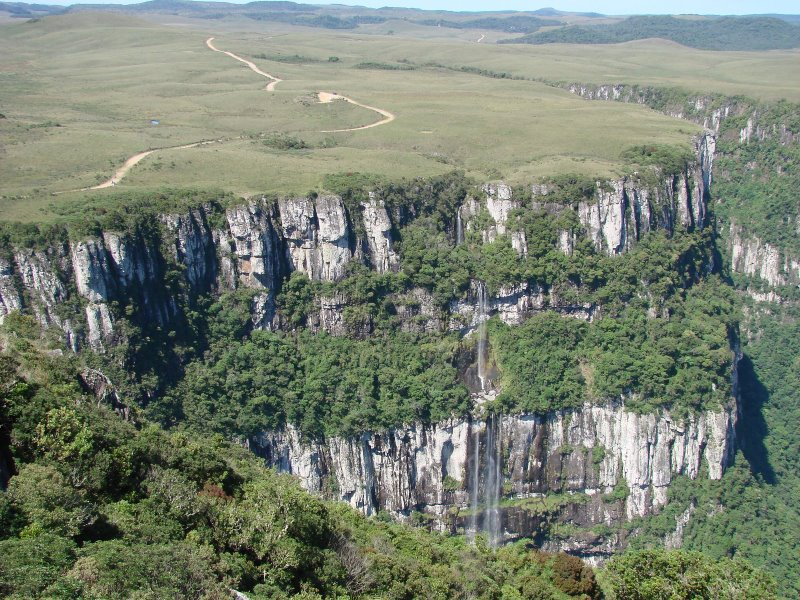
Fortaleza Canyon

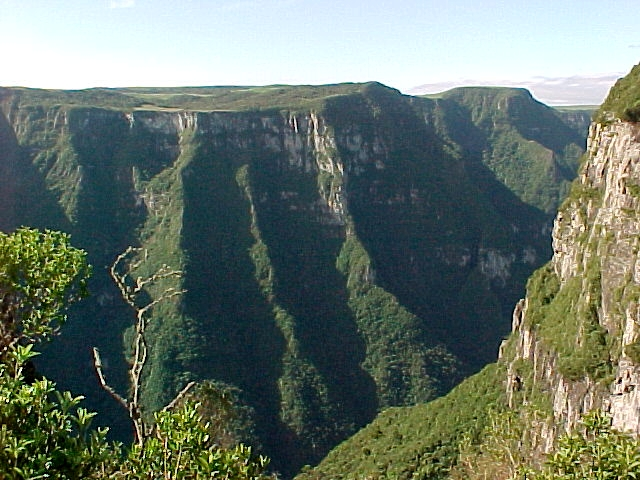
Fortaleza Canyon
