= Melanophryniscus spectabilis =

Conservation status
- Data Deficient (IUCN 3.1)

Scientific classification
- Kingdom: Animalia
- Phylum: Chordata
- Class: Amphibia
- Order: Anura
- Family: Bufonidae
- Genus: Melanophryniscus
- Species: M. spectabilis

Binomial name
- Melanophryniscus spectabilis Caramaschi and Cruz, 2002

Species of amphibian

Melanophryniscus spectabilis is a species of toads in the family Bufonidae. It is known from western Santa Catarina and southern Paraná states, southern Brazil. The specific name spectabilis refers to the showy color pattern of this species.

== Description ==
Adult males measure 25–31 mm (1.0–1.2 in) and adult females 29–36 mm (1.1–1.4 in) in snout–vent length. The head is broader than it is long. The snout is short; there is a prominent, rounded protuberance above snout. The tympanum is concealed. The fingers and toes have rounded tips but lack discs; the toes are half-webbed whereas the fingers have no webbing. Skin is dorsally and laterally mostly covered by spinulose warts. Ventral skin is spinulose. The dorsum and the flanks have dark brown to black background with a marbled pattern of sinuous yellow. The ventral region has a large orange uniform spot; there are also a few small orange spots in the chest and three yellow or orange spots in the gular surface.

== Habitat and conservation ==
Melanophryniscus spectabilis occurs in deciduous (seasonal) and Araucaria–pine within the Atlantic Forest at elevations of 380–1,100 m (1,250–3,610 ft) above sea level.

Melanophryniscus spectabilis was classified as "data deficient" in 2010, at the time when it was only known from its type locality. After the assessment, it has been recorded in new locations, but its distribution remains restricted. It is unclear whether this species is genuinely rare or just difficult to find. Nevertheless, the Atlantic Forest in general has greatly suffered from habitat loss.
