= Melanophryniscus biancae =

Scientific classification
- Kingdom: Animalia
- Phylum: Chordata
- Class: Amphibia
- Order: Anura
- Family: Bufonidae
- Genus: Melanophryniscus
- Species: M. biancae

Binomial name
- Melanophryniscus biancae Bornschein et al., 2015

Species of amphibian

Melanophryniscus biancae is a species of toads in the family Bufonidae, first found in the Atlantic Forest in Santa Catarina, Brazil. It is found at intermediate-high altitudes and has a phytotelm-breeding reproductive strategy. It is distinguished from its cogenerate species based on differences in snout-vent length; having white and/or yellow spots on its forearms, mouth, belly and cloaca; the pattern and arrangement of warts; and the presence and number of corneous spines. It might be threatened by habitat loss. It was named in honor of Bianca Reinert due to her conservation efforts.
