= Melanophryniscus rubriventris =

Conservation status
- Least Concern (IUCN 3.1)

Scientific classification
- Kingdom: Animalia
- Phylum: Chordata
- Class: Amphibia
- Order: Anura
- Family: Bufonidae
- Genus: Melanophryniscus
- Species: M. rubriventris

Binomial name
- Melanophryniscus rubriventris (Vellard, 1947)

Species of amphibian

Melanophryniscus rubriventris is a species of toad in the family Bufonidae. It is found in Argentina and Bolivia. Its natural habitats are subtropical or tropical dry forests, subtropical or tropical moist montane forests, rivers, rural gardens, heavily degraded former forest, and canals and ditches.
