= Melanophryniscus sanmartini =

Conservation status
- Near Threatened (IUCN 3.1)

Scientific classification
- Kingdom: Animalia
- Phylum: Chordata
- Class: Amphibia
- Order: Anura
- Family: Bufonidae
- Genus: Melanophryniscus
- Species: M. sanmartini

Binomial name
- Melanophryniscus sanmartini Klappenbach, 1968

Species of amphibian

Melanophryniscus sanmartini (common name: San Martin redbelly toad) is a species of toad in the family Bufonidae. It is found in Uruguay and southernmost Brazil (Rio Grande do Sul). Its natural habitats are grasslands and rocky outcrops. Reproduction takes place in small streams. It is threatened by habitat loss caused by exotic tree plantations.
