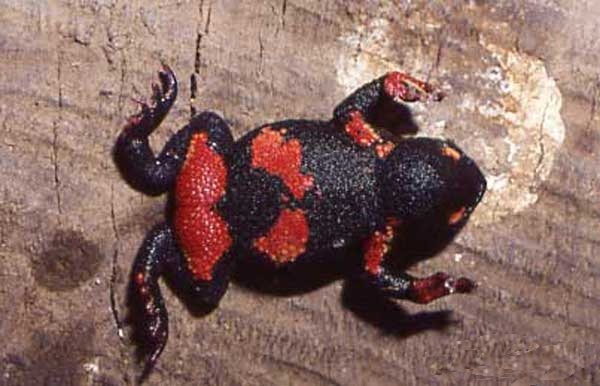

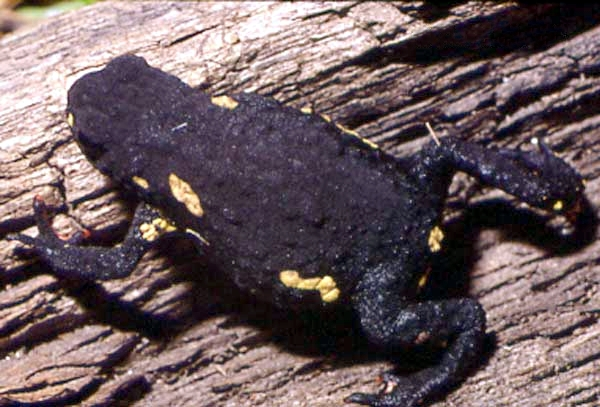
- M. atroluteus (above, underside), M. montevidensis (below, upperside)

Scientific classification
- Domain: Eukaryota
- Kingdom: Animalia
- Phylum: Chordata
- Class: Amphibia
- Order: Anura
- Family: Bufonidae
- Genus: Melanophryniscus; Gallardo, 1961

Type species
- Phryniscus stelzneri Weyenbergh, 1875

Species
- 29 species (see text)

= Melanophryniscus =

Genus of amphibians

Melanophryniscus is a genus of toads in the family Bufonidae. They are found in northern half of Argentina, southern Bolivia, southern Brazil, Paraguay, and Uruguay. Common name South American redbelly toads has been coined for them.

== Species ==
There are 31 recognized species:

- Melanophryniscus admirabilis Di-Bernardo, Maneyro, and Grillo, 2006
- Melanophryniscus alipioi Langone, Segalla, Bornschein, and de Sá, 2008
- Melanophryniscus atroluteus (Miranda-Ribeiro, 1920)
- Melanophryniscus biancae Bornschein, Baldo. Pie, Firkowski. Ribeiro, and Corrêa, 2015
- Melanophryniscus cambaraensis Braun and Braun, 1979
- Melanophryniscus cupreuscapularis Céspedez and Alvarez, 2000
- Melanophryniscus devincenzii Klappenbach, 1968
- Melanophryniscus diabolicus (Martinez Aguirre et al., 2021)
- Melanophryniscus dorsalis (Mertens, 1933)
- Melanophryniscus estebani Céspedez, 2008
- Melanophryniscus fulvoguttatus (Mertens, 1937)
- Melanophryniscus klappenbachi Prigioni and Langone, 2000
- Melanophryniscus krauczuki Baldo and Basso, 2004
- Melanophryniscus langonei Maneyro, Naya, and Baldo, 2008
- Melanophryniscus macrogranulosus Braun, 1973
- Melanophryniscus milanoi Baldo, Bornschein, Pie, Firkowski, Ribeiro, and Belmonte-Lopes, 2015
- Melanophryniscus montevidensis (Philippi, 1902)
- Melanophryniscus moreirae (Miranda-Ribeiro, 1920)
- Melanophryniscus nigricans (Martinez Aguirre et al., 2021)
- Melanophryniscus pachyrhynus (Miranda-Ribeiro, 1920)
- Melanophryniscus paraguayensis Céspedez and Motte, 2007
- Melanophryniscus peritus Caramaschi and Cruz, 2011
- Melanophryniscus rubriventris (Vellard, 1947)
- Melanophryniscus sanmartini Klappenbach, 1968
- Melanophryniscus setiba Peloso, Faivovich, Grant, Gasparini, and Haddad, 2012
- Melanophryniscus simplex Caramaschi and Cruz, 2002
- Melanophryniscus spectabilis Caramaschi and Cruz, 2002
- Melanophryniscus stelzneri (Weyenbergh, 1875)
- Melanophryniscus tumifrons (Boulenger, 1905)
- Melanophryniscus vilavelhensis Steinbach-Padilha, 2008
- Melanophryniscus xanthostomus Baldo, Bornschein, Pie, Ribeiro, Firkowski, and Morato, 2015

The AmphibiaWeb also recognizes Melanophryniscus orejasmirandai, which the Amphibian Species of the World treats as synonym of Melanophryniscus pachyrhynus.
