= Cambará do Sul =

Municipality of Rio Grande do Sul, Brazil

- Municipality
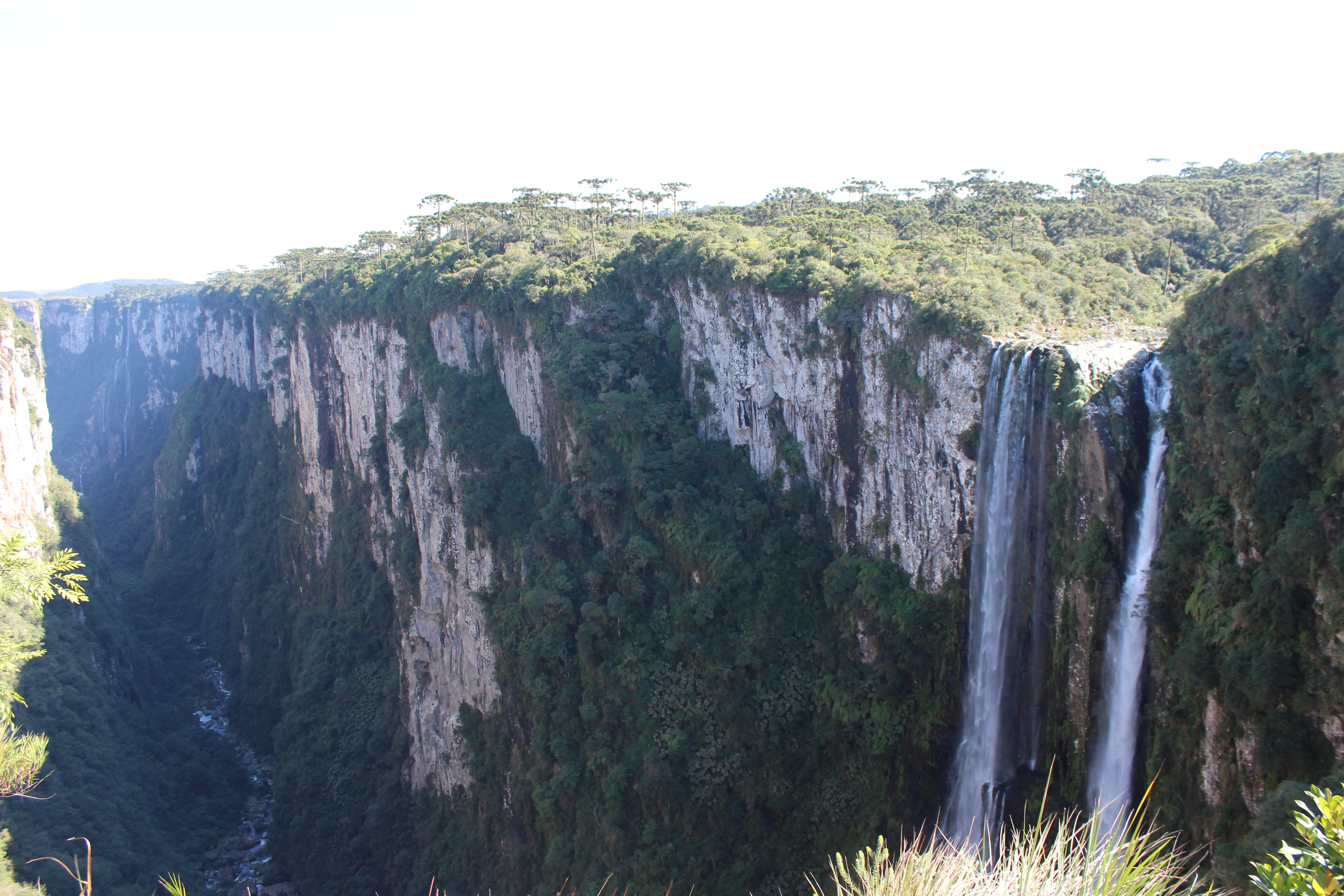
- Canyons Itaimbezinho

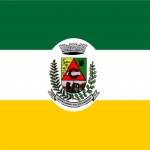
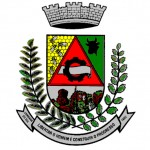
- Flag Coat of arms

- Location within Rio Grande do Sul

- Location in Brazil
- Coordinates: 29°22′S 50°08′W
- Country: Brazil
- State: Rio Grande do Sul

Population (2020)
  - Total: 6,406
- Time zone: UTC−3 (BRT)
- Website: http://cambaradosul.rs.gov.br/

Cambará do Sul is a municipality in the state of Rio Grande do Sul, Brazil. Its population was approximately 6,406 in 2020. It has an area of approximately 1212 km^{2}.

The municipality is one of the coldest in Brazil and sometimes there is the occurrence of snow.

The city is located 185 kilometers from Porto Alegre, at an altitude of 1,031 m, and coordinates latitude 29º02'52" South and longitude 50º08'41" West. Its estimated population in 2005 was 6,682 inhabitants according to the Brazilian Institute of Statistics (IBGE). The Human Development Index (HDI) was 0.76 according to the Atlas of Human Development / UNDP (2000).

The municipality has an area of 1,213 km^{2} and was installed in 1963 from a dismemberment of São Francisco de Paula.

The municipality contains part of the 6,655 hectares (16,440 acres) Tainhas State Park, created in 1975. In Cambara do Sul are the headquarters of Aparados da Serra National Park and Serra Geral National Park, where several canyons are located, among which the most famous are Itaimbezinho, Fortaleza, Churriado, and Malacara.

The Aparados da Serra National Park is also partly located in the neighboring municipality of Praia Grande, in the state of Santa Catarina , bathed by Rio do Boi, with numerous waterfalls, of which the main ones are Leite de Moça and Braço Forte.

Cambará do Sul is an ecotourism destination featuring numerous inns, rural landscapes, and a mountain climate. During the winter, the municipality experiences low temperatures and occasional snowfall.

== Gallery ==
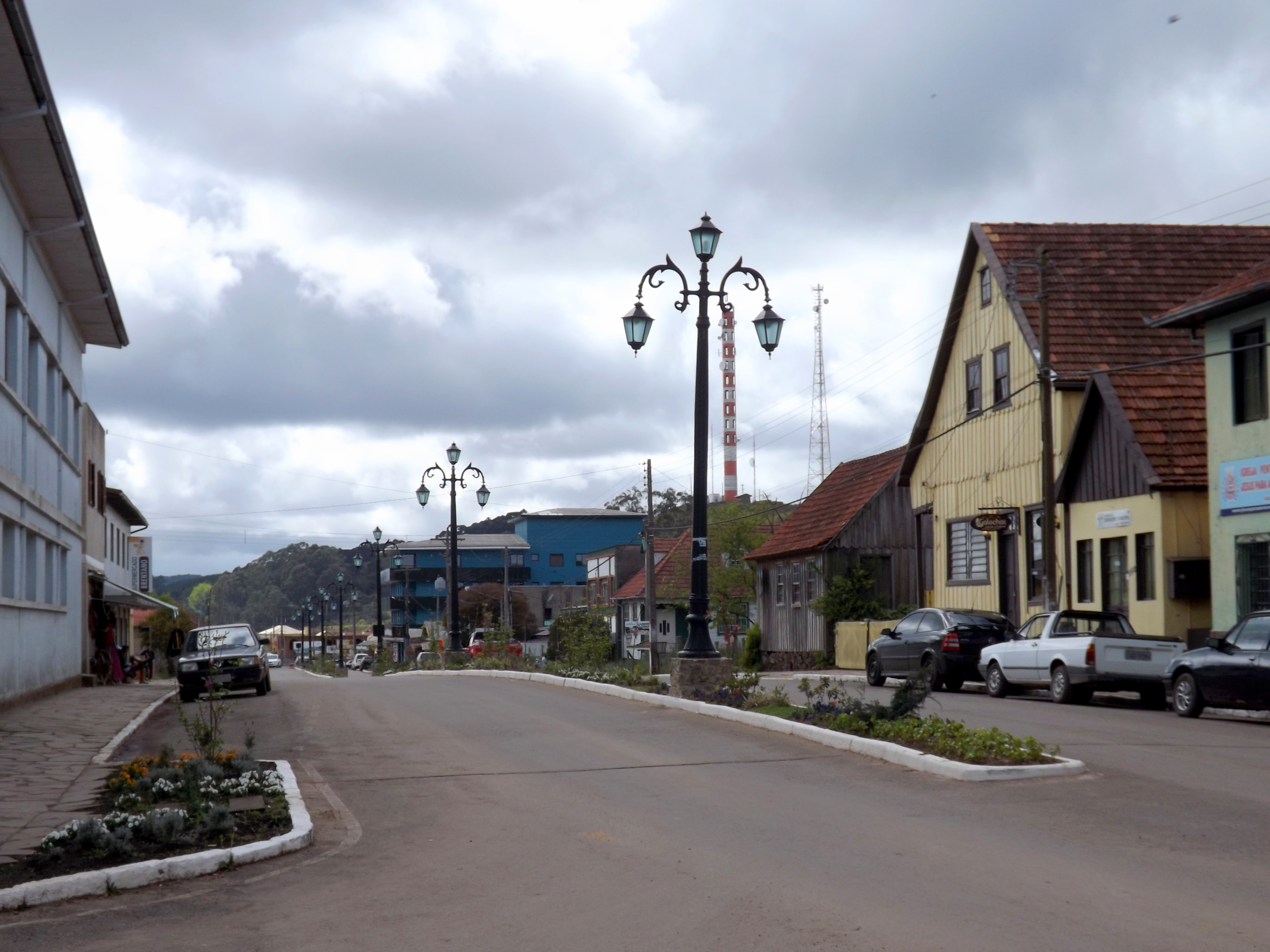
Downtown Cambará do Sul

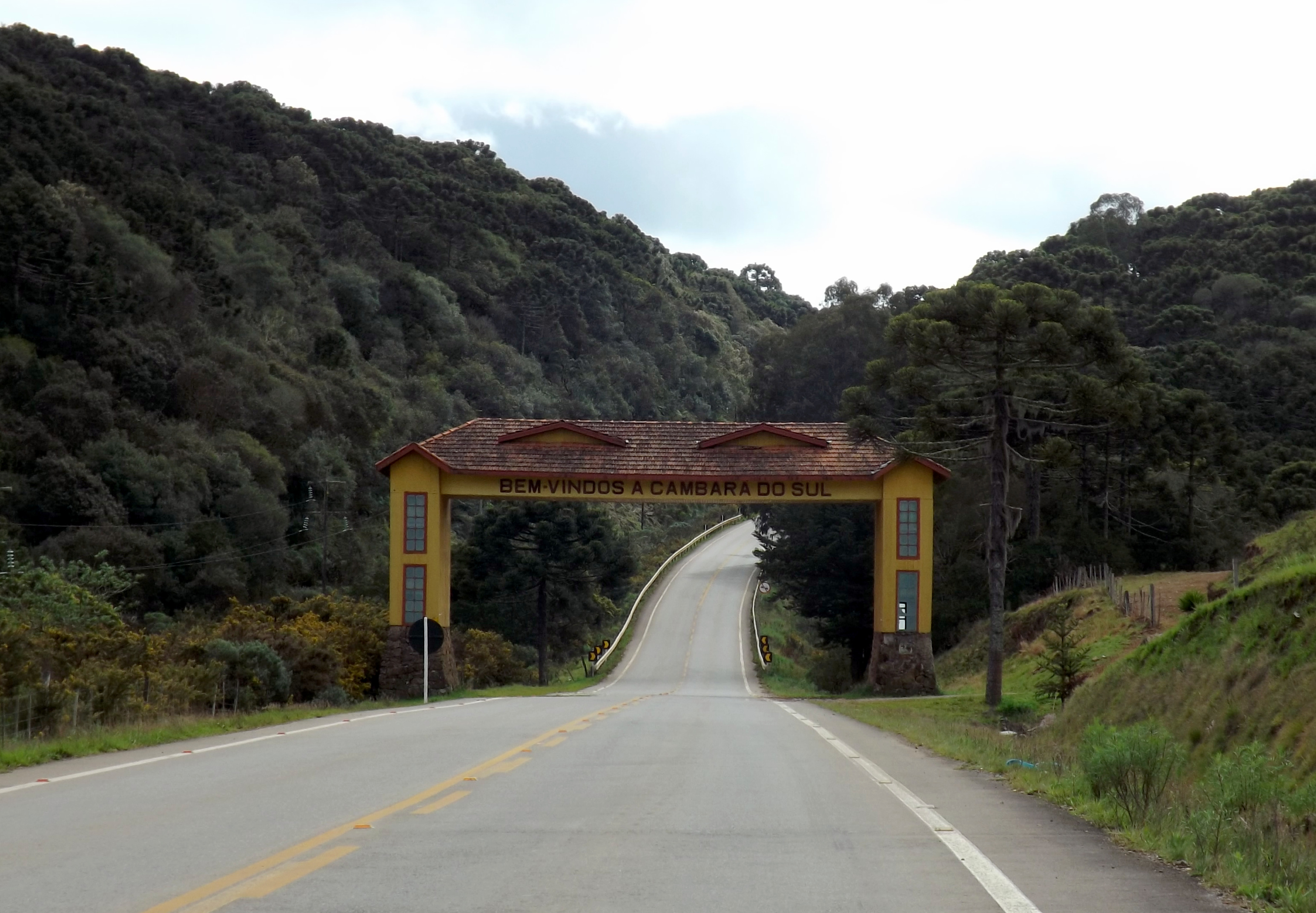
Entrance of Cambará do Sul

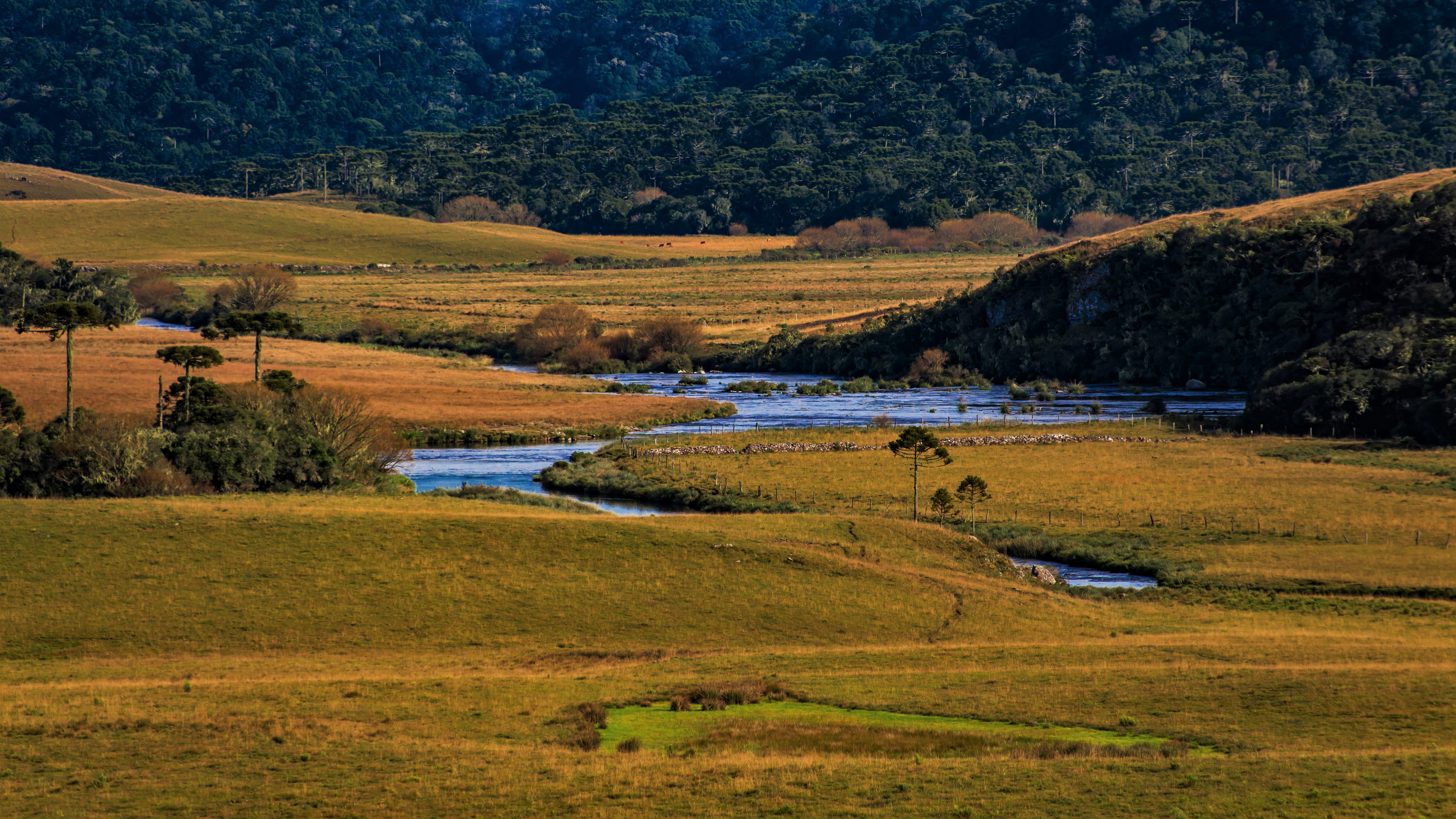
Garrafa River

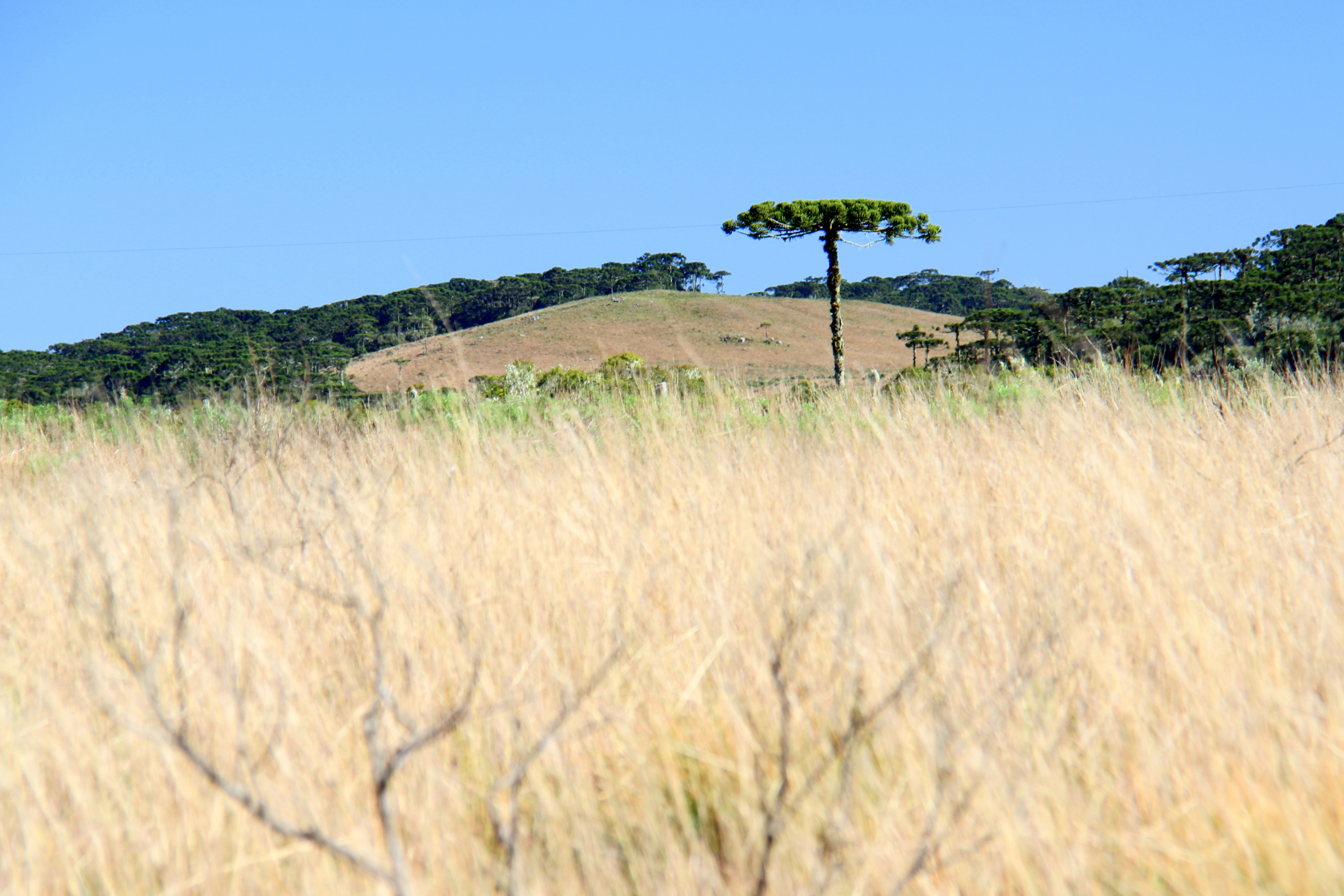
Aparados da Serra National Park

== Climate ==
Climate data for Cambará do Sul, Rio Grande do Sul (1981-2010)
Month	Jan	Feb	Mar	Apr	May	Jun	Jul	Aug	Sep	Oct	Nov	Dec	Year
Record high °C (°F)	31.5 (88.7)	31.2 (88.2)	31.4 (88.5)	28.8 (83.8)	25.6 (78.1)	25.4 (77.7)	25.2 (77.4)	28.7 (83.7)	30.0 (86.0)	29.9 (85.8)	31.0 (87.8)	30.3 (86.5)	31.5 (88.7)
Mean daily maximum °C (°F)	24.4 (75.9)	24.3 (75.7)	23.8 (74.8)	21.4 (70.5)	17.4 (63.3)	17.2 (63.0)	16.8 (62.2)	18.5 (65.3)	18.5 (65.3)	20.7 (69.3)	22.1 (71.8)	23.7 (74.7)	20.7 (69.3)
Daily mean °C (°F)	18.6 (65.5)	18.4 (65.1)	18.0 (64.4)	15.5 (59.9)	11.8 (53.2)	11.5 (52.7)	10.4 (50.7)	11.8 (53.2)	12.3 (54.1)	14.7 (58.5)	16.2 (61.2)	17.6 (63.7)	14.7 (58.5)
Mean daily minimum °C (°F)	14.1 (57.4)	13.9 (57.0)	13.7 (56.7)	10.9 (51.6)	7.5 (45.5)	7.1 (44.8)	5.6 (42.1)	6.6 (43.9)	7.5 (45.5)	9.9 (49.8)	11.3 (52.3)	12.5 (54.5)	10.1 (50.2)
Record low °C (°F)	4.3 (39.7)	6.1 (43.0)	4.0 (39.2)	0.1 (32.2)	−4.3 (24.3)	−4.2 (24.4)	−7.2 (19.0)	−5.5 (22.1)	−3.7 (25.3)	0.3 (32.5)	1.3 (34.3)	2.5 (36.5)	−7.2 (19.0)
Average precipitation mm (inches)	166.2 (6.54)	192.4 (7.57)	168.2 (6.62)	113.8 (4.48)	141.2 (5.56)	108.7 (4.28)	153.7 (6.05)	147.4 (5.80)	192.4 (7.57)	159.4 (6.28)	155.2 (6.11)	124.8 (4.91)	1,823.4 (71.77)
Average relative humidity (%)	84.4	85.0	85.4	84.5	84.9	83.9	82.2	79.3	82.8	84.0	82.3	82.9	83.5
Source: INMET

== See also ==
- List of municipalities in Rio Grande do Sul
- Snow in Brazil
