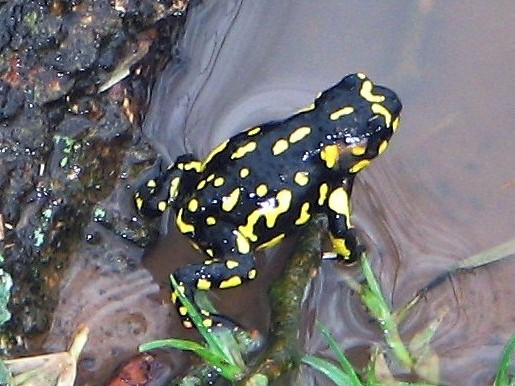

Conservation status
- Least Concern (IUCN 3.1)

Scientific classification
- Kingdom: Animalia
- Phylum: Chordata
- Class: Amphibia
- Order: Anura
- Family: Bufonidae
- Genus: Melanophryniscus
- Species: M. klappenbachi

Binomial name
- Melanophryniscus klappenbachi Prigioni and Langone, 2000

= Melanophryniscus klappenbachi =

Species of amphibian

Melanophryniscus klappenbachi, also known as Klappenbach's red-bellied frog, is a South American species of toad in the family Bufonidae.

== Distribution and habitat ==
It is found in the Gran Chaco in northern Argentina, Paraguay, and Brazil (Mato Grosso do Sul), and possibly in Bolivia. Its specific name refers to Miguel Angel Klappenbach, a Uruguayan zoologist.

Its natural habitats are shrublands, and it can also be found in disturbed areas such as livestock farms. It is an explosive breeder utilizing temporary pools.

== Behaviour and ecology ==
Alkaloids produce toxins when consumed in large amounts, and one of the toxins that is given off is batrachotoxin-homobatrachotoxin, which contributes to the toxicity of the species. When fed diets with low levels of alkaloids, there was a decrease in the amount of this toxin produced.

== Threats ==
Melanophryniscus klappenbachi is a common species facing no significant threats. It is present in the international pet trade.
