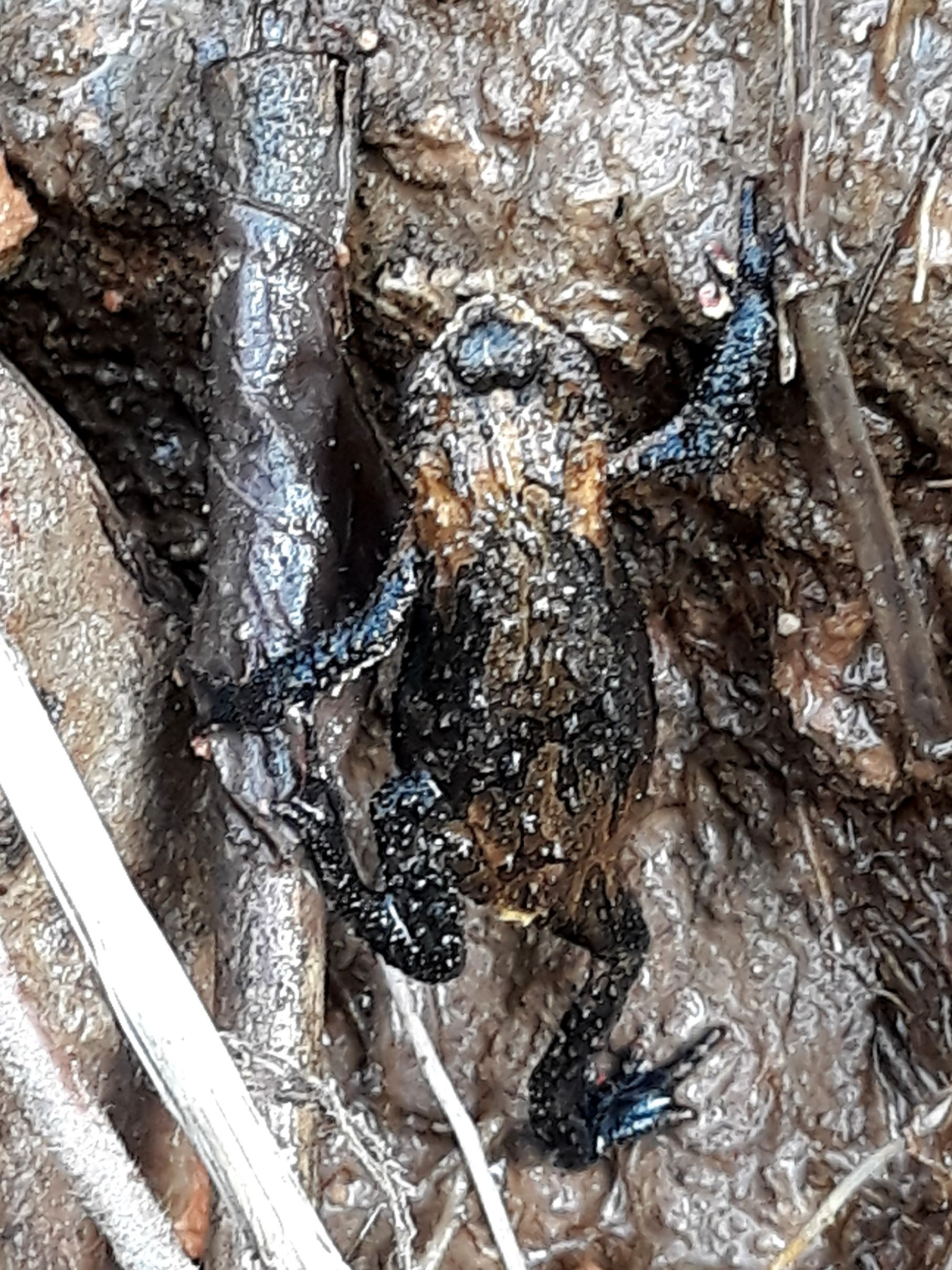

Conservation status
- Data Deficient (IUCN 3.1)

Scientific classification
- Kingdom: Animalia
- Phylum: Chordata
- Class: Amphibia
- Order: Anura
- Family: Bufonidae
- Genus: Melanophryniscus
- Species: M. simplex

Binomial name
- Melanophryniscus simplex Caramaschi & Cruz, 2002

= Melanophryniscus simplex =

Species of amphibian

Melanophryniscus simplex is a species of toads in the family Bufonidae.

It is endemic to Brazil. Its natural habitats are subtropical or tropical high-altitude grassland, rivers, intermittent freshwater lakes, and freshwater marshes. It is threatened by habitat loss.
