= Melanophryniscus cupreuscapularis =

Conservation status
- Near Threatened (IUCN 3.1)

Scientific classification
- Kingdom: Animalia
- Phylum: Chordata
- Class: Amphibia
- Order: Anura
- Family: Bufonidae
- Genus: Melanophryniscus
- Species: M. cupreuscapularis

Binomial name
- Melanophryniscus cupreuscapularis Cespedez & Alvarez, 2000 (1999)

Species of amphibian

Melanophryniscus cupreuscapularis is a species of toad in the family Bufonidae. It is endemic to Argentina. Its natural habitats are subtropical or tropical moist shrubland, subtropical or tropical seasonally wet or flooded lowland grassland, and intermittent freshwater marshes. It is threatened by habitat loss.
