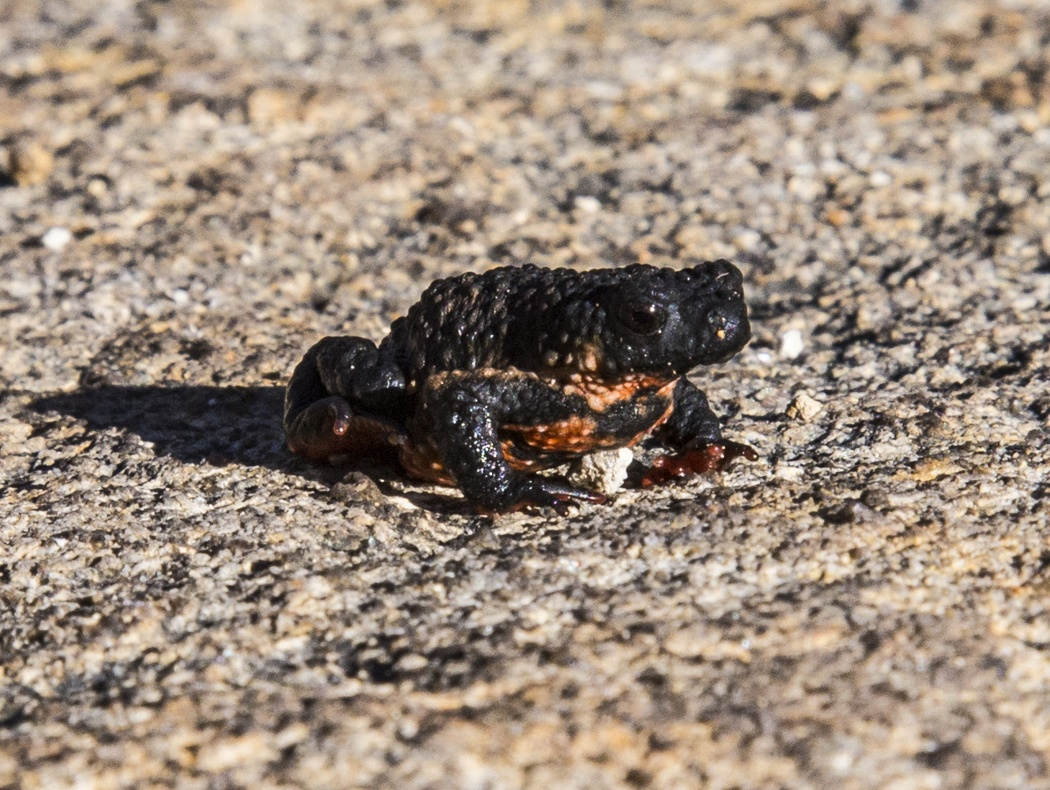

Conservation status
- Near Threatened (IUCN 3.1)

Scientific classification
- Kingdom: Animalia
- Phylum: Chordata
- Class: Amphibia
- Order: Anura
- Family: Bufonidae
- Genus: Melanophryniscus
- Species: M. moreirae

Binomial name
- Melanophryniscus moreirae (Miranda-Ribeiro, 1920)

= Maldonada redbelly toad =

Species of amphibian

The Maldonada redbelly toad (Melanophryniscus moreirae) is a species of toad in the family Bufonidae. It is endemic to Brazil. Its natural habitats are subtropical or tropical high-altitude grassland, swamps, and intermittent freshwater marshes.
