= Jaquirana =

Municipality in Rio Grande do Sul, Brazil

Coordinates: 28°54′S 50°23′W

- Municipality
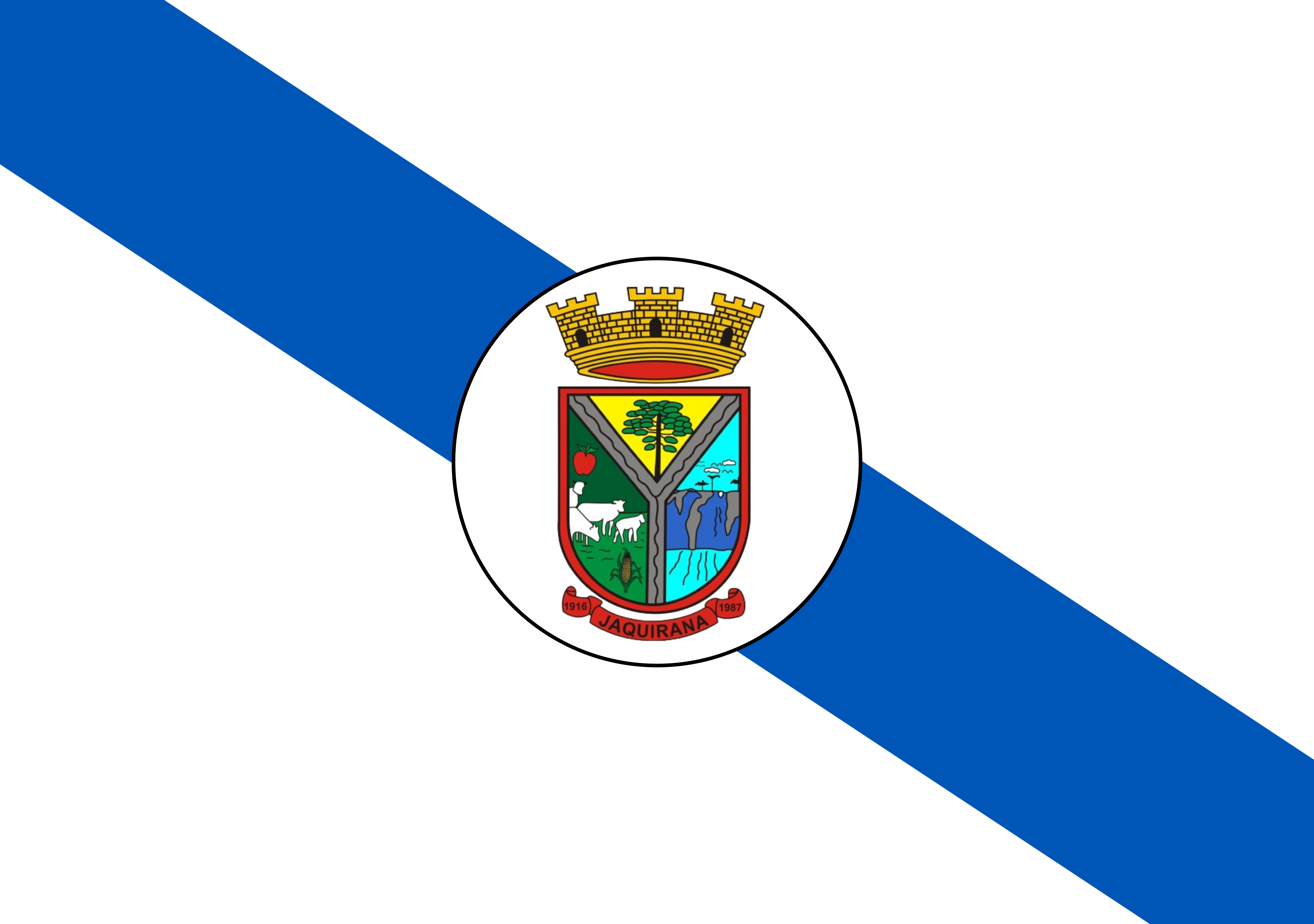
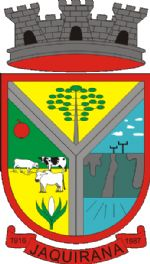
- Flag Coat of arms
- Interactive map of Jaquirana
- Country: Brazil
- Time zone: UTC−3 (BRT)

Location in Rio Grande do Sul

Jaquirana is a municipality in the state of Rio Grande do Sul, Brazil. As of 2020, the estimated population was 3,662.

The municipality contains part of the 6,655-hectare (16,440-acre) Tainhas State Park, created in 1975.

== See also ==
- List of municipalities in Rio Grande do Sul
