= Melanophryniscus admirabilis =

Conservation status
- Critically Endangered (IUCN 3.1)

Scientific classification
- Kingdom: Animalia
- Phylum: Chordata
- Class: Amphibia
- Order: Anura
- Family: Bufonidae
- Genus: Melanophryniscus
- Species: M. admirabilis

Binomial name
- Melanophryniscus admirabilis Di-Bernardo, Maneyro & Grillo, 2006

Species of amphibian

Melanophryniscus admirabilis is a species of toads in the family Bufonidae. It is endemic to Brazil. Melanophryniscus admirabilis is a small, critically endangered toad that is only found in one specific region in the Atlantic Forest of southern Brazil, along the rocky edges of the Rio Forqueta in Arvorezinha, Rio Grande do Sul. Its skin carries different types of helpful bacteria that are believed to protect it from harmful pathogens like the chytrid fungus, which might be one of the reasons it's still surviving in a region that's been heavily affected by human activity.
