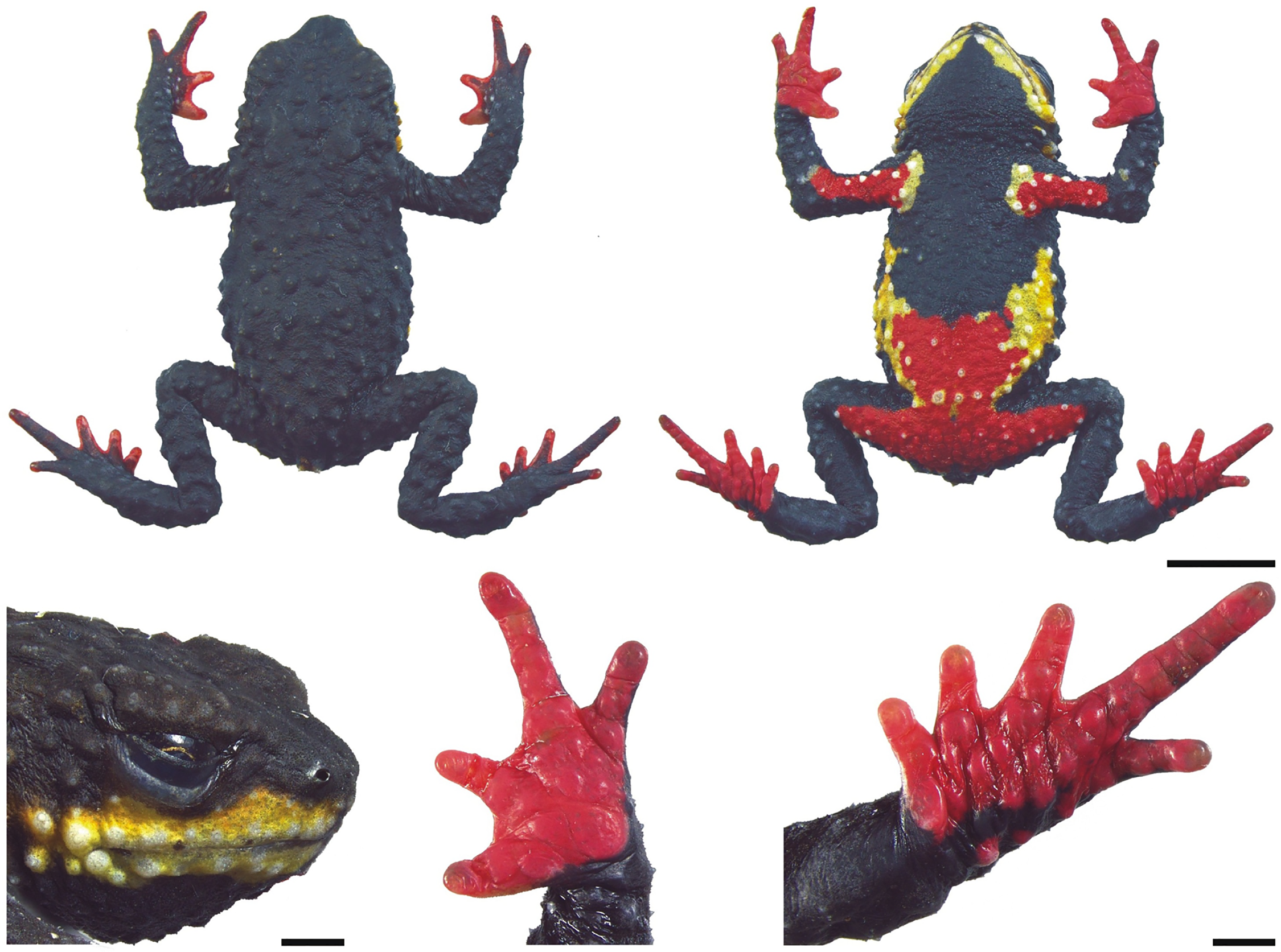
- Holotype of M. xanthostomus, an adult male. Top: dorsal and ventral views. Bottom: head, hand, and foot.

Scientific classification
- Kingdom: Animalia
- Phylum: Chordata
- Class: Amphibia
- Order: Anura
- Family: Bufonidae
- Genus: Melanophryniscus
- Species: M. xanthostomus

Binomial name
- Melanophryniscus xanthostomus Baldo, Bornschein, Pie, Ribeiro, Firkowski, and Morato, 2015
- Melanophryniscus xanthostomus is only known from the vicinity of its type locality in NE Santa Catarina state, Brazil

= Melanophryniscus xanthostomus =

Species of amphibian

Melanophryniscus xanthostomus is a species of toads in the family Bufonidae. It is endemic to the state of Santa Catarina in southern Brazil. The specific name xanthostomus is derived from the Greek words xanthos (=yellow) and stoma (=mouth) and refers to the characteristic yellow stripe along its mouth. It is distinguished from congeneric species based on differences in size; having white and/or yellow spots on its forearms, mouth, belly and cloaca; the pattern and arrangement of warts; and the presence and number of corneous spines.

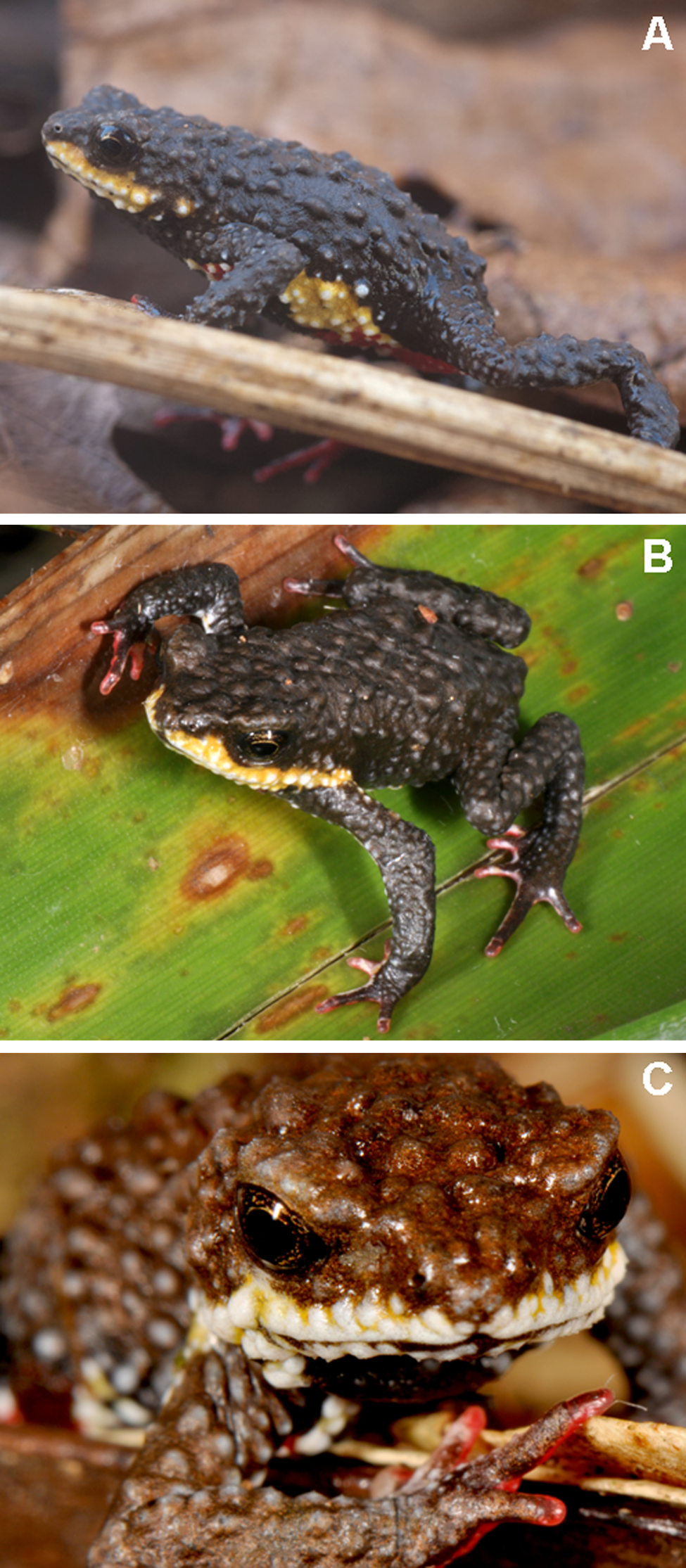
M. xanthostomus males in life.

== Description ==
Adult males measure 16.9–21.5 mm (0.67–0.85 in) and adult females 20.5–21.5 mm (0.81–0.85 in) in snout–vent length. The snout is short. No tympanum is visible. The fingers and toes are short, slightly webbed at the base, and with rounded tips. The hands and feet are red in ventral view. The dorsum is dark brown to black with a large yellow and white strip along the maxilla, extending up to the lower half of loreal region. There are yellow spots on chest and abdomen. Dorsal skin bears medium-sized, rounded glandular warts tipped with very few spines, while the venter is covered with medium glandular warts tipped with a spine.

Males have a subgular vocal sac. The male advertisement call comprises two segments: the first consists of short and single notes, and the second one is a long trill (multi-pulsed note). The total duration of call is 12–21 seconds and its dominant frequency is 3101–3618 Hz.

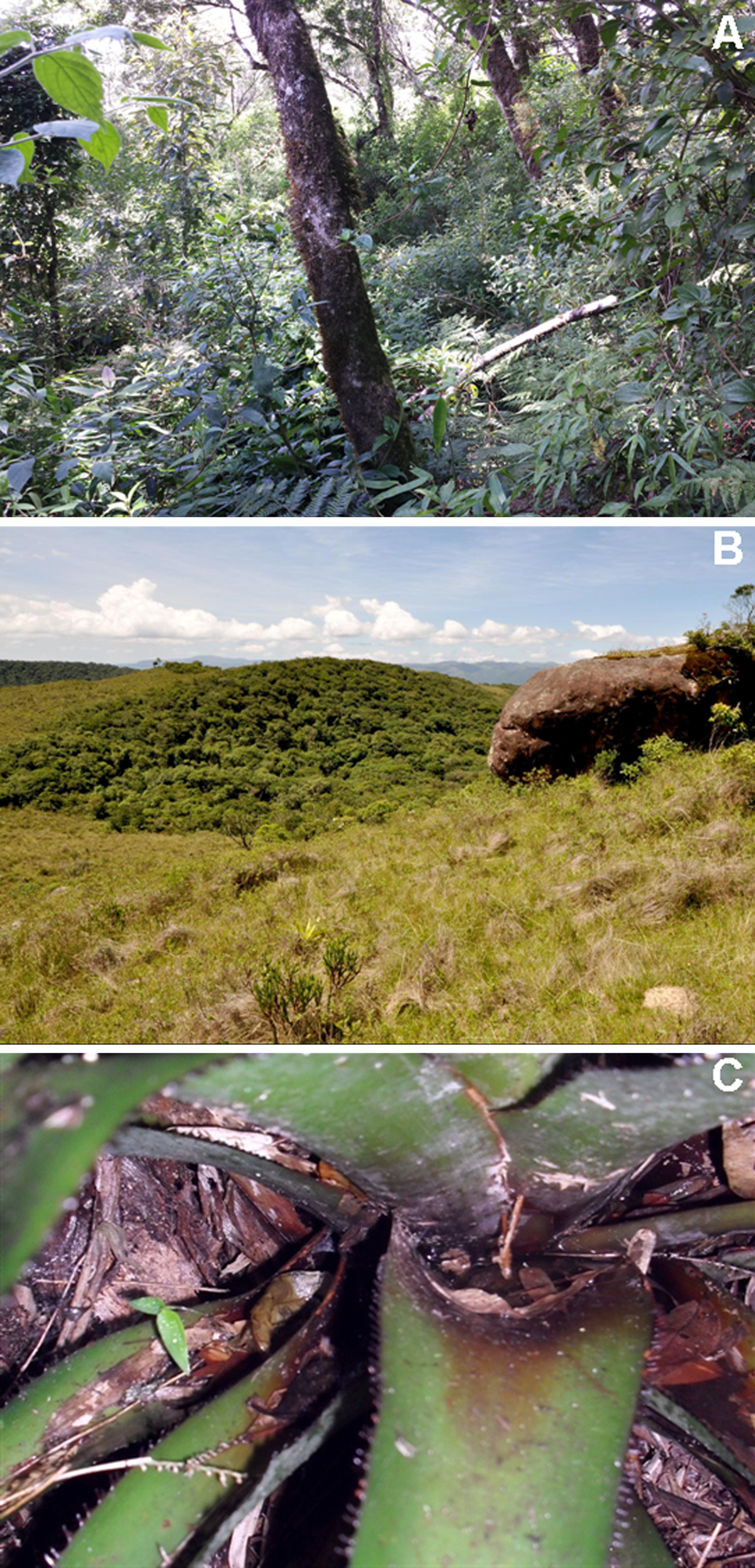
Habitat of M. xanthostomus: A = Type locality, a forest recovering from a fire a few years before; B = Cloud forest at Reserva Particular do Patrimônio Natural Caetezal; C = Terrestrial bromeliad where a male was calling.

== Habitat and conservation ==
Melanophryniscus xanthostomus is found in cloud forest, montane forest, and the transition between montane forest with Araucaria forest at elevations of 565–1,275 m (1,854–4,183 ft) above sea level. Specimens have been observed in terrestrial bromeliads, on bamboo, and on the ground (a pair in amplexus). Reproduction takes place in phytotelmata, in particular the water tanks of bromeliads. Between one and ten eggs per leaf axil has been observed.

As of early 2022, this species has not been assessed for the IUCN Red List. Bornschein and colleagues suggested that it might qualify as "endangered" in view of its small range and disturbances to its habitat, including deforestation and fires. It is present in Reserva Particular do Patrimônio Natural Caetezal.
