= Bianca Reinert =

Brazilian ornithologist and biologist (c.1966–2018)

Bianca Luiza Reinert
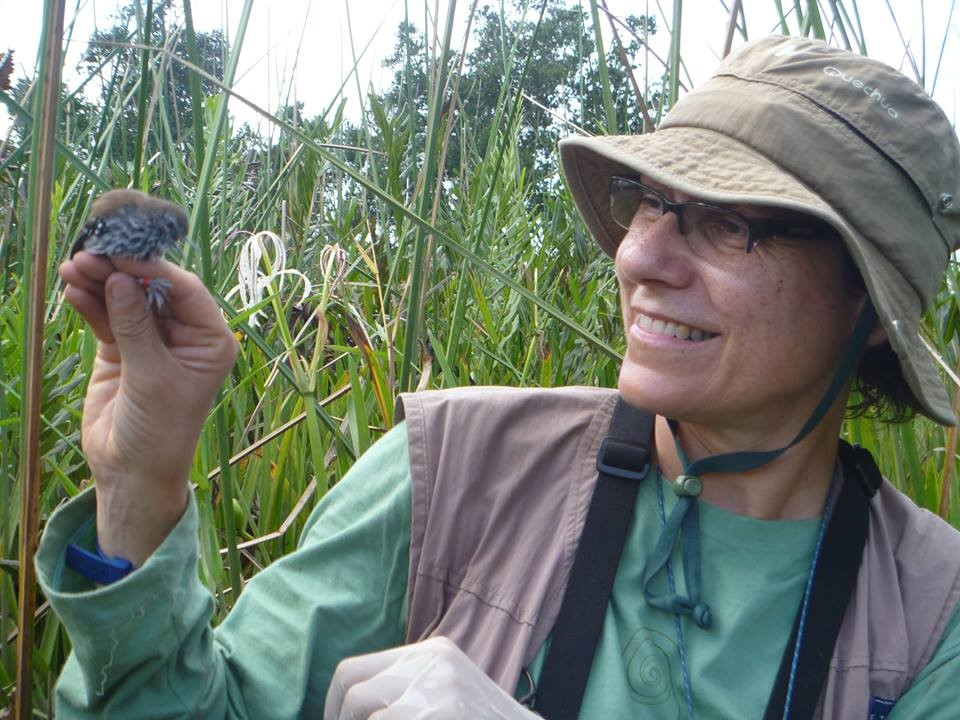
- Born: c. 1966
- Died: 10 September 2018
- Burial place: Curitiba
- Education: Pontifical Catholic University of Paraná; Federal University of Paraná; Rio de Janeiro State University
- Occupations: Biologist, ornithologist

Bianca Luiza Reinert (c. 1966 – 10 September 2018) was a Brazilian biologist and ornithologist. She was one of a group of ornithologists who discovered a previously undocumented species of swamp bird, Formicivora acutirostris. She also worked to create a nature reserve to preserve its habitat.

== Education ==
Reinert held a degree in Biological Sciences from the Pontifical Catholic University of Paraná, a master's degree in Forestry Sciences from the Federal University of Paraná, and a Ph.D. in Zoology from Rio de Janeiro State University.

== Career ==
Reinert was a researcher at the Natural History Museum in Curitiba. In 1995, she was working on the Parana coast with colleagues Dante Teixeira and Marcos Bonrnschien when they discovered an undocumented bird. On examination, the group decided it was a new genus as well as a new species: Stymphalornis acutirostris. The taboa swamp that the bird lived in was being encroached on by human activities, so in 2008 Reinert and others formed an organisation to create a nature reserve in nearby Guaratuba. In 2009, Reinert and four others purchased land in Guaratuba and had it designated as a Private Natural Heritage Reserve (Reserva Particular do Patrimônio Natural). In 2015, a species of toad found in Brazil, Melanophryniscus biancae, was named in her honor due to her conservation efforts.

Reinert collaborated with poet, Adélia Maria Woellner, and illustrator, Kitty Harvill to produce a picture book, A descoberta do Bicudinho-do-Brejo, which is about S. acutirostris and was released in July 2018. Reinert invited Woellner to work with her on the book in order to increase the public's knowledge of S. acutirostris.

=== Selected publications ===
- Conhecendo Aves Silvestres Brasileiras: Knowing Brazilian Birds (with Marcos R. Bornschein and Ricardo Belmonte-Lopes, 2004)

== Personal life ==
Reinert died after a battle with cancer and was buried in Curitiba. She was 52 years old.
