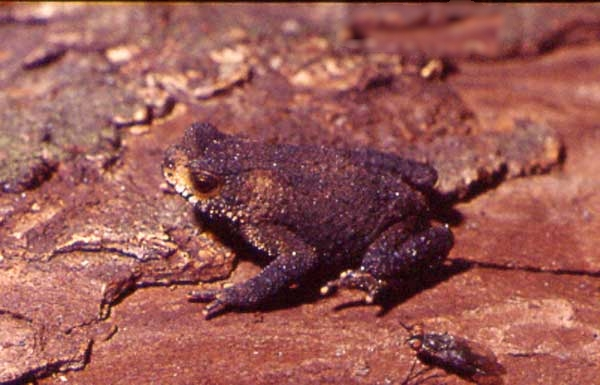

Conservation status
- Endangered (IUCN 3.1)

Scientific classification
- Kingdom: Animalia
- Phylum: Chordata
- Class: Amphibia
- Order: Anura
- Family: Bufonidae
- Genus: Melanophryniscus
- Species: M. devincenzii

Binomial name
- Melanophryniscus devincenzii Klappenbach, 1968

= Melanophryniscus devincenzii =

Species of amphibian

Melanophryniscus devincenzii is a species of toad in the family Bufonidae. It is found in Argentina, Uruguay, possibly Brazil, and possibly Paraguay. Its natural habitats are subtropical or tropical moist lowland forests, subtropical or tropical seasonally wet or flooded lowland grassland, intermittent rivers, rocky areas, and plantations. It is threatened by habitat loss.
