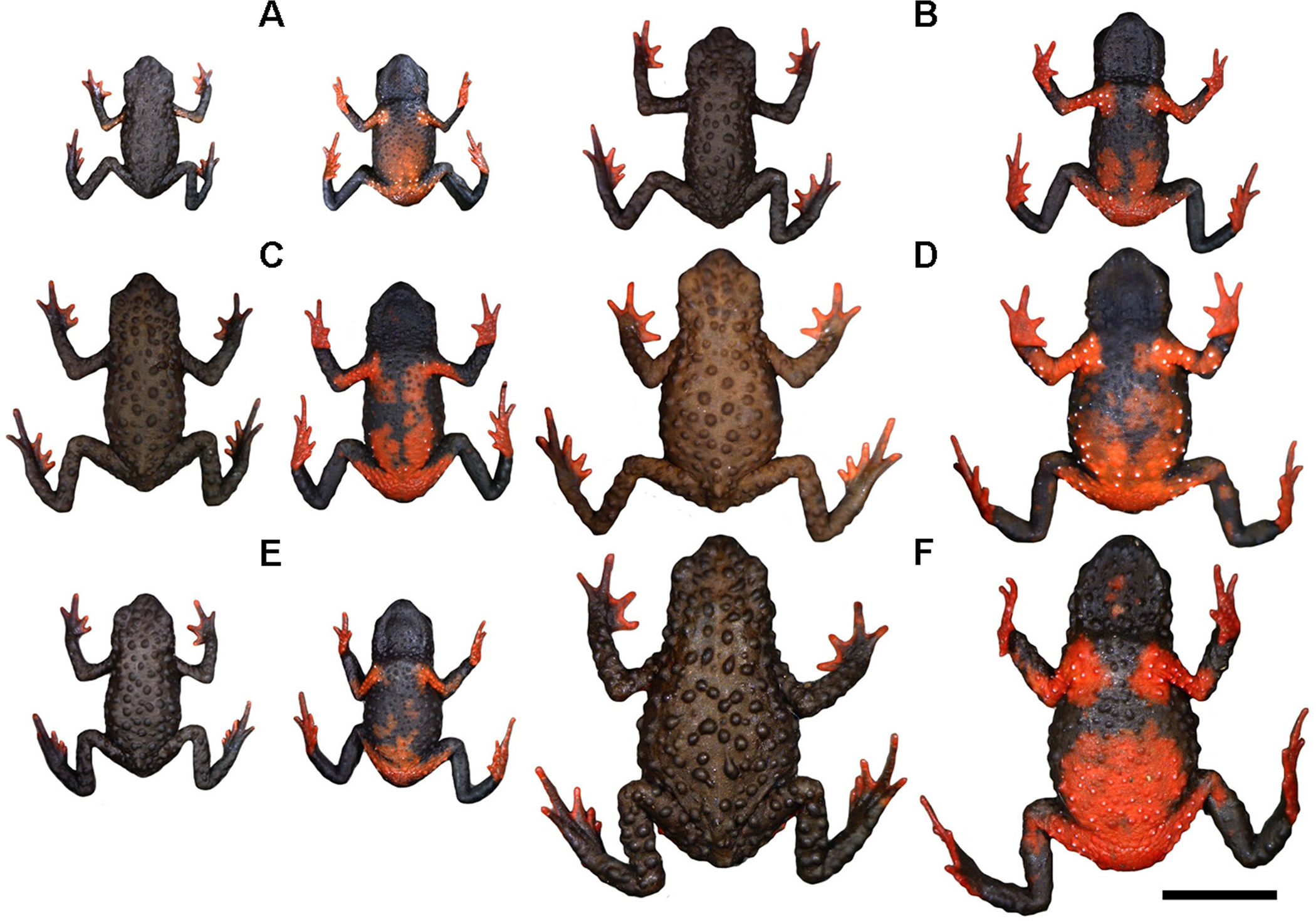

Conservation status
- Vulnerable (IUCN 3.1)

Scientific classification
- Kingdom: Animalia
- Phylum: Chordata
- Class: Amphibia
- Order: Anura
- Family: Bufonidae
- Genus: Melanophryniscus
- Species: M. alipioi

Binomial name
- Melanophryniscus alipioi Langone, Segalla, Bornschein & de Sá, 2008

= Melanophryniscus alipioi =

Species of toad

Melanophryniscus alipioi is a species of true toad found in the states of Paraná and Santa Catarina in Brazil. It is found at elevations ranging from 800 to 1,400 m (2,600 to 4,600 ft).
