= Tainhas State Park =

State park in Rio Grande do Sul, Brazil

- Parque Estadual do Tainhas
- IUCN category II (national park)
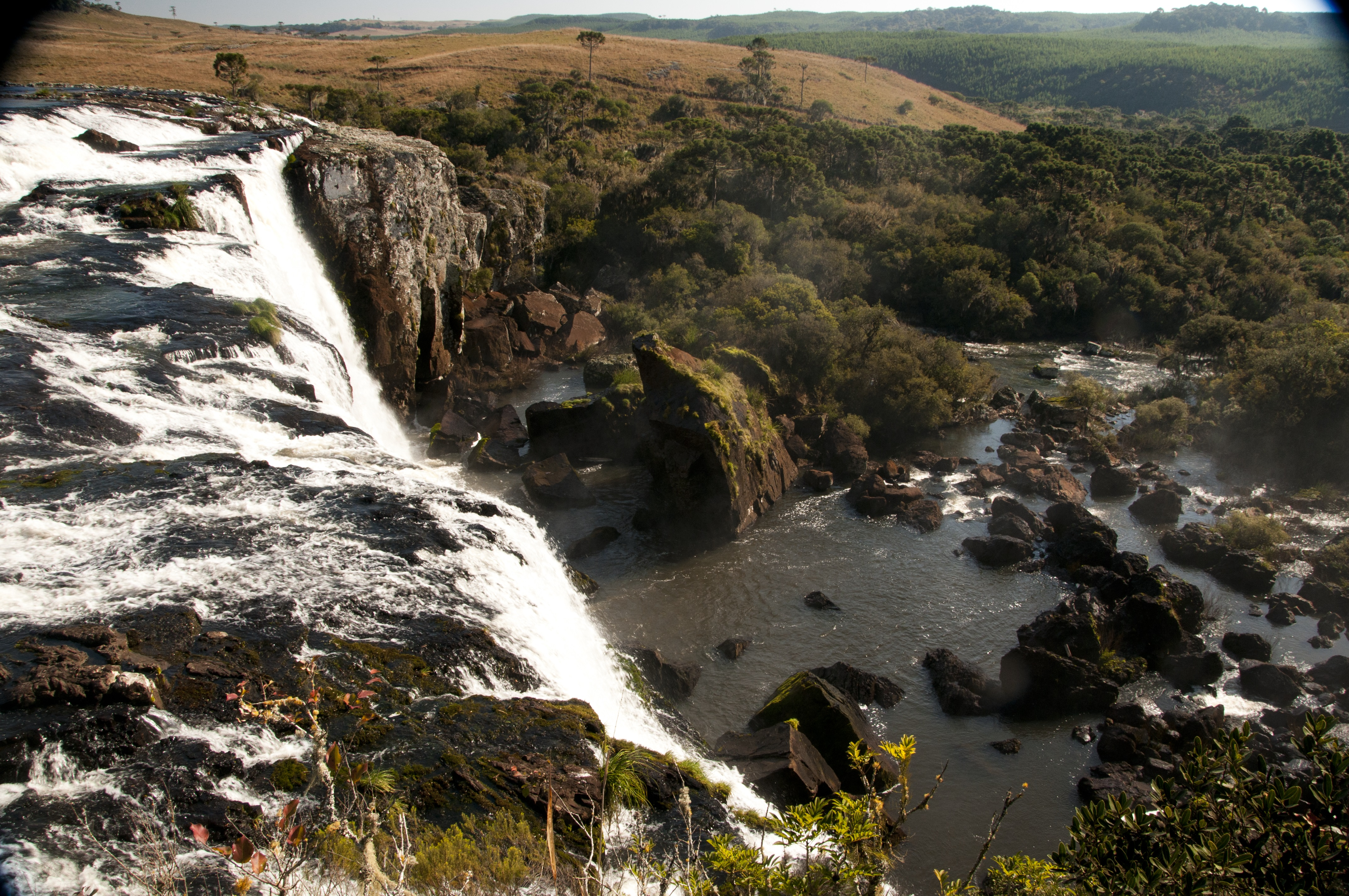
- Cachoeira do Passo do S

- Location within Brazil
- Nearest city: Jaquirana, Rio Grande do Sul
- Coordinates: 29.084606°S 50.366°W
- Area: 6,654.67 hectares (16,444.0 acres)
- Designation: State park
- Created: 12 March 1975

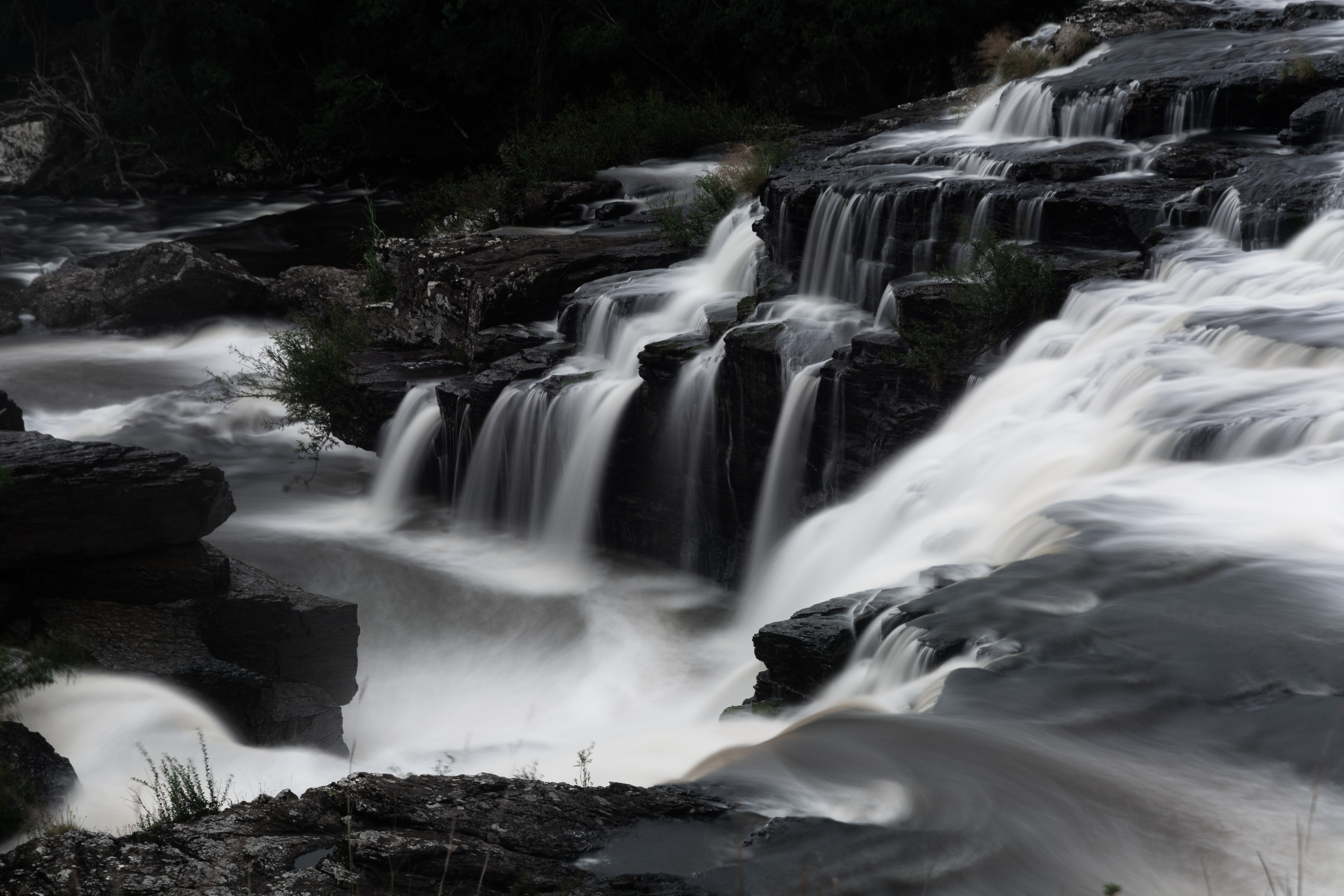
A waterfall in Tainhas State Park

The Tainhas State Park (Portuguese: Parque Estadual do Tainhas) is a state park in the state of Rio Grande do Sul, Brazil. It protects forests in the valley of the Tainhas River surrounded by open fields. The main attraction is the Cachoeira do Passo do S, a waterfall.

== Location ==
The Tainhas State Park is divided between the municipalities of Jaquirana, São Francisco de Paula and Cambará do Sul in the northeast region of the Rio Grande do Sul. The administrative center is in São Francisco de Paula. It has an area of 6,654.67 hectares (16,444.0 acres). It protects Atlantic Forest remnants in the state, including the ecosystems of the meadows of Cima da Serra and the forests of the valley of the Tainhas River. Vegetation includes forest with araucarias, upland meadows and plains. The terrain includes relatively flat areas and valleys with steep slopes. As of 2016 the park was not open to visitors.

The park holds the Passo do S Waterfall, in the municipality of Jaquirana, where the Tainhas River runs over an S-shaped ledge. The falls are 80 metres (260 ft) wide and 15 metres (49 ft) high. Hunting, fishing and camping around the falls are prohibited. When the river is low, it is possible to cross the Passo do S on horseback or on foot.

== History ==
The Tainhas State Park was created by state decree 23.798 on 12 March 1975. It is classified as a fully protected conservation unit, allowing only indirect use of natural resources. The management plan for the park was published in September 2008. At this time there were 98 residents in 31 establishments engaged in cattle raising, family farming and forestry. The plan gives a five-year view of priority actions including land regularization, administration and recovery of degraded areas.

== Sources ==
- Bencke, Glayson Ariel; Duarte, Marcelo Maisonette (September 2008), Plano do Manejo do Parque Estadual do Tainhas (PDF) (in Portuguese), Porto Alegre: SEMA/RS, archived from the original (PDF) on 2016-03-03
- "Cachoeira do Passo do S é atração no Rio Tainhas, no RS", G1 Globo (in Portuguese), 29 November 2012
- "Parque Estadual de Tainhas", cambaradosul.tur.br (in Portuguese), archived from the original on 2016-02-14
