= Melanophryniscus fulvoguttatus =

Conservation status
- Least Concern (IUCN 3.1)

Scientific classification
- Kingdom: Animalia
- Phylum: Chordata
- Class: Amphibia
- Order: Anura
- Family: Bufonidae
- Genus: Melanophryniscus
- Species: M. fulvoguttatus

Binomial name
- Melanophryniscus fulvoguttatus (Mertens, 1937)

Species of amphibian

Melanophryniscus fulvoguttatus is a species of toad in the family Bufonidae. It is found in Argentina, Brazil, and Paraguay. Its natural habitats are subtropical or tropical moist shrubland, subtropical or tropical seasonally wet or flooded lowland grassland, and intermittent freshwater marshes. It is threatened by habitat loss.
