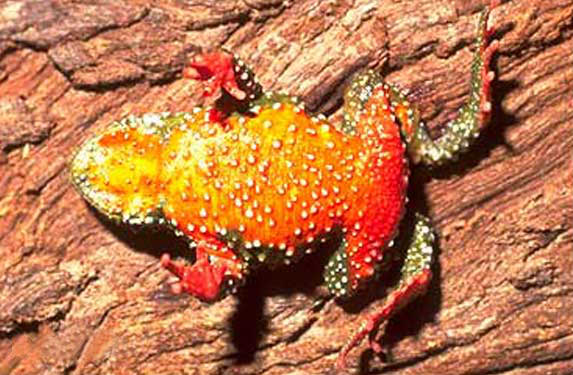

Conservation status
- Data Deficient (IUCN 3.1)

Scientific classification
- Kingdom: Animalia
- Phylum: Chordata
- Class: Amphibia
- Order: Anura
- Family: Bufonidae
- Genus: Melanophryniscus
- Species: M. cambaraensis

Binomial name
- Melanophryniscus cambaraensis Braun & Braun, 1979

= Melanophryniscus cambaraensis =

Species of amphibian

Melanophryniscus cambaraensis is a species of toad in the family Bufonidae. It is endemic to Brazil. Its natural habitats are subtropical or tropical moist lowland forests, moist savanna, subtropical or tropical seasonally wet or flooded lowland grassland, rivers, intermittent freshwater marshes, and canals and ditches. It is threatened by habitat loss.
