= Fachinal, Misiones =

Fachinal (Misiones)
- Municipality and village
- Location within Misiones Province Location within Argentina
- Country: Argentina
- Province: Misiones Province

Government
  - Intendant: Miguel Ángel Benítez
- Time zone: UTC−3 (ART)

Fachinal (Misiones) is a village and municipality in Misiones Province in north-eastern Argentina.
