= Melanophryniscus tumifrons =

Conservation status
- Least Concern (IUCN 3.1)

Scientific classification
- Kingdom: Animalia
- Phylum: Chordata
- Class: Amphibia
- Order: Anura
- Family: Bufonidae
- Genus: Melanophryniscus
- Species: M. tumifrons

Binomial name
- Melanophryniscus tumifrons (Boulenger, 1905)

Synonyms
- Atelopus tumifrons Boulenger, 1905

Species of amphibian

Melanophryniscus tumifrons is a species of toad in the family Bufonidae. It is endemic to Brazil. Its natural habitats are subtropical or tropical moist lowland forests, moist savanna, subtropical or tropical seasonally wet or flooded lowland grassland, intermittent freshwater marshes, pastureland, and heavily degraded former forest. It is threatened by habitat loss.
