= Melanophryniscus macrogranulosus =

Conservation status
- Vulnerable (IUCN 3.1)

Scientific classification
- Kingdom: Animalia
- Phylum: Chordata
- Class: Amphibia
- Order: Anura
- Family: Bufonidae
- Genus: Melanophryniscus
- Species: M. macrogranulosus

Binomial name
- Melanophryniscus macrogranulosus Braun, 1973

Species of amphibian

Melanophryniscus macrogranulosus is a species of toad in the family Bufonidae. It is endemic to northeastern Rio Grande do Sul, southern Brazil. It was for a long time only known from the type series collected in 1960 (the precise location of which was unknown), until another population was discovered in 2004. This was followed by the rediscovery of population at the type locality as well as few other populations, all in Rio Grande do Sul. Its common name is Torres redbelly toad, after the type locality.

== Description ==
Melanophryniscus macrogranulosus grow to at least 31 mm (1.2 in) snout–vent length. Individuals larger than about 28 mm (1.1 in) SVL are considered adults.

Colouration changes through development. Dorsum in newly metamorphosed juveniles is dark gray. The ventral surface is pale, partially translucent. Palmar and plantar surfaces are also pale. Later on, palmar and plantar surfaces and the posterior region of venter show a pallid orange colour that gets more intense over time. Larger juveniles have also dark green dorsal surface of body and limbs, dark blue ventral surface with white spots, and some orange-red patches on the axils and belly. Colouration is variable in adults. The dorsal colour varies from light to dark green to almost black. Ventral surface exhibits a green or grayish blue pattern with red patches; one patch is always present on abdominal region and axils, and often in gular and pectoral region. There are small white spots covering all ventral surface, including limbs, throat, pectoral and abdominal regions. Palmar and plantar surfaces have red orange colouration.

Colouration is suspected to be aposematic. These toads show the unkenreflex when disturbed.

== Reproduction ==
Melanophryniscus macrogranulosus is an explosive breeder, breeding after heavy rains in temporary streams. Males call in shallow water along the streams both day and night, sometimes hidden in small cavities in the ground. Amplexus takes place in water.

== Habitat and conservation ==
Melanophryniscus macrogranulosus is only known from the Atlantic Forest biome. All known populations occur close to forest remnants. Breeding takes place in temporary streams.

The International Union for Conservation of Nature has assessed the species as "Vulnerable". Caorsi and her colleagues suggest that it should be classified as "Endangered" because of its small range, fragmented habitat, and disturbance from human activities. It is not known to occur within any protected area.
