= Aparados da Serra National Park =

National park in southern Brazil

- IUCN category II (national park)
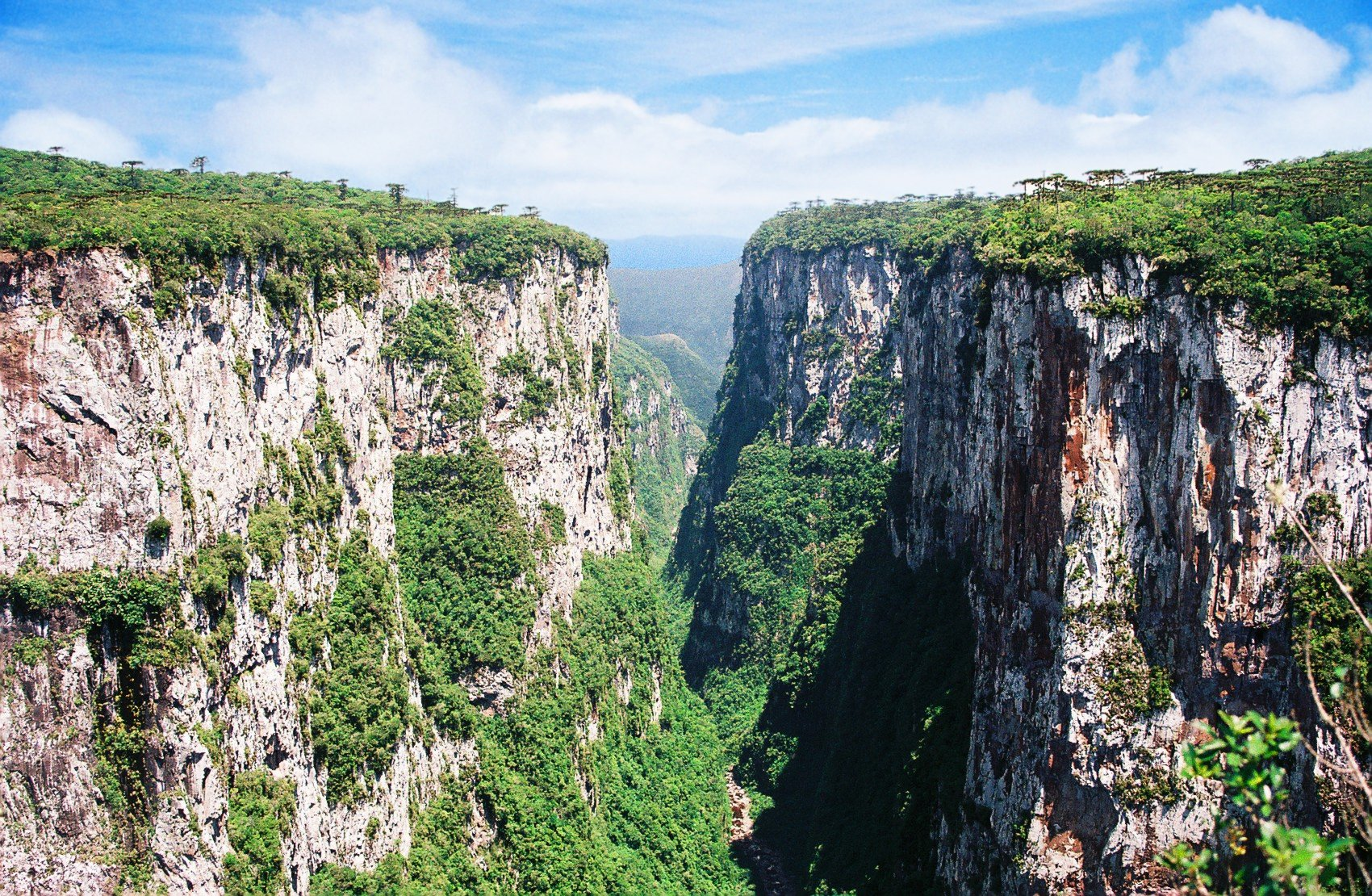
- The Itaimbezinho canyon in the national park

- Location within Brazil
- Coordinates: 29°11′S 50°5′W
- Area: 102.5 km^{2} (39.6 sq mi)
- Designation: National park
- Established: 1959
- Visitors: 38,000 (in 2002)
- Governing body: IBAMA

The Aparados da Serra National Park (Portuguese: Parque Nacional de Aparados da Serra) is a national park located in the Serra Geral range of Rio Grande do Sul and Santa Catarina states in the south of Brazil, between 29º07'—29º15' S and 50º01'—50º10' W. It was created in 1959 as one of Brazil's first national parks, to protect the Itaimbezinho canyon. It extends over an area of 10,250 hectares and also includes the Fortaleza, Malacara, and Índios Coroado Canyons.

== Geology ==
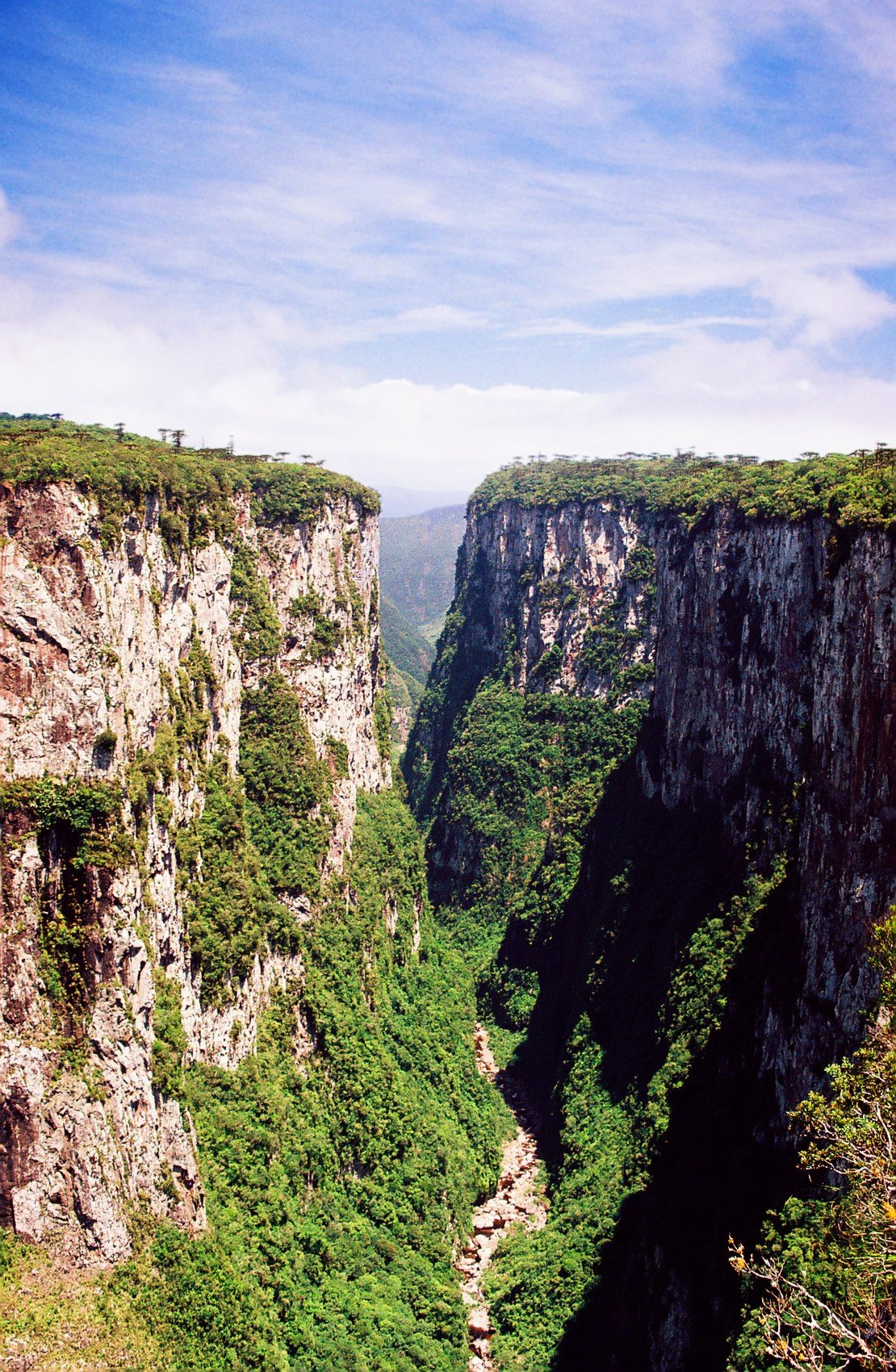
Itaimbezinho

The geology of the Aparados da Serra da Serra National Park is dominated by the presence of volcanic rocks of the Paraná-Etendeka Large Igneous Province, which are locally grouped in the Serra Geral Group. This geological group is further divided into four lava formations, namely Torres, Vale do Sol, Palmas, and Esmeralda. Additional rock formations in the area include sedimentary rocks of the Paraná Basin, including the eolian sandstones of the Botucatu Formation.

Geomorphologically, the Aparados da Serra National Park can be classified as a continental escarpment, featuring an elevated plateau and the presence of deeply incised fluvial valleys. Because of the strong mechanical resistance of these rocks, erosion rates in the Aparados Serra da Serra National Park are extremely low, ranging from 6 m/million years on the plateau and up to 50 m/million years in the escarpment.

== Flora and fauna ==
Despite its relatively small size, the park is characterised by a rich biodiversity, as result of its diverse relief and of being situated at the contact between coastal forests, grasslands and Araucaria moist forests. There have been at least 143 bird, 48 mammal, and 39 amphibian species documented in the park.

Endangered fauna on the plateaus of the park include the red-spectacled amazon parrot, the maned wolf, and the cougar. On the slopes, the neotropical otter, ocelot and the brown howling monkey can be found.

== Conservation and threats ==
When created in 1959, the national park protected an area of 13,000 ha. This was reduced to 10,250 ha in 1972 through a presidential decree. In 1992 adjoining the national park, the new Serra Geral National Park was created, encompassing an additional 17,300 ha. However, according to the Duke University's Center for Tropical Conservation, the current park area, even after the extension with Serra Geral National Park, is still too small to be effective for the protection of representative samples of each distinct environment.

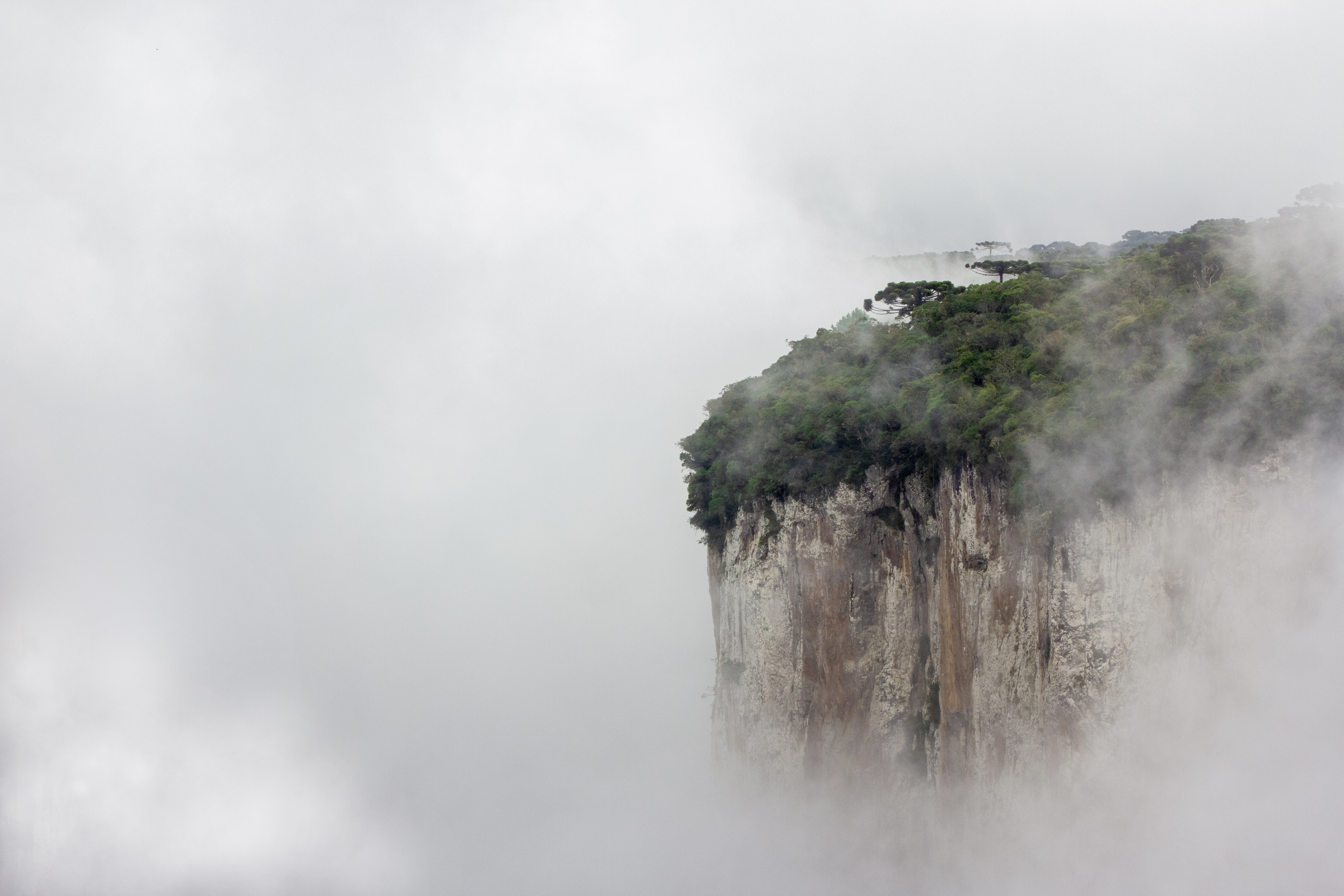
A misty cliff in the national park Aparados da Serra

One of the main obstacles for conservation efforts is that the state only has title over 67.5% of the land, and even part of that is occupied by farmers. Raising cattle, the practice of using fire to "renew" grasslands, the establishment of banana plantations with associated use of pesticides and the presence of domestic animals, all contribute to environmental degradation. Other threats are posed by invasive flora from the areas surrounding the park and poaching.

Currently a maximum of 1,500 visitors per day are allowed in the park.
