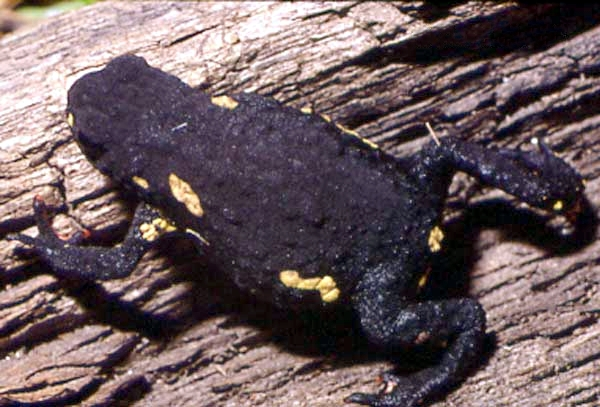

Conservation status
- Vulnerable (IUCN 3.1)

Scientific classification
- Kingdom: Animalia
- Phylum: Chordata
- Class: Amphibia
- Order: Anura
- Family: Bufonidae
- Genus: Melanophryniscus
- Species: M. montevidensis

Binomial name
- Melanophryniscus montevidensis (Phillippi, 1902)

Synonyms
- Melanophryniscus stelzneri ssp. montevidensis Gallardo, 1991

= Melanophryniscus montevidensis =

Species of amphibian

Melanophryniscus montevidensis, also called Darwin's toad, is a species of toad in the family Bufonidae and the genus Melanophryniscus found in Brazil and Uruguay. Like other amphibians in its genus, its bright colors, defensive behavior, and rapid metamorphosis make it stand out. It also has a myriad of chemical compounds on its skin that could be used in biomedical applications.

Darwin's toad is jet black with yellow patches on its back, sides, forelimbs, and ventral. It has a red spot on the ventral side of the thigh and part of the abdomen. The palms of his hands and soles of its feet are also red.

== Habitat and Behavior ==
The Darwin's toad's natural habitats are temperate shrubland, intermittent freshwater marshes, and sandy shores. This species can be found on the coast of the Río de la Plata and the Atlantic Ocean, from Santiago Vázquez (Montevideo) to Praia da Alvorada (Rio Grande do Sul).

It is generally found in coastal sandbanks with psammophilous vegetation, preferring open areas with vegetation and, occasionally, flooded grasslands. It takes refuge in caves that it builds in the sand among the vegetation.

The Darwin's toad is typically diurnal. It primarily feeds on ants, but will also eat small beetles, springtails and aphids.

Its reproductive activity is short and usually occurs after heavy rains from late spring to early autumn. During the mating season, the males will act territorially. Their vocal repertoire changes and the males will have short fights. They can also be found in winter after heavy rains when the ambient temperature is above 15 °C (59 °F).

When being held by hand, the specimens usually remain motionless with their belly up, displaying their red and yellow coloration. This defensive behavior has been called the Unken reflex.

== Conservation status ==
The Darwin's toad is considered a Critically Endangered (CR) species in Uruguay and globally Vulnerable (VU) due to habitat loss from urbanization of the areas where it lives. Some models predict a total disappearance of the climatic conditions where this species is distributed, which could cause its extinction by mid-century, due to its reproductive behavior being dependent on rainfall and temperatures in the warm months.
