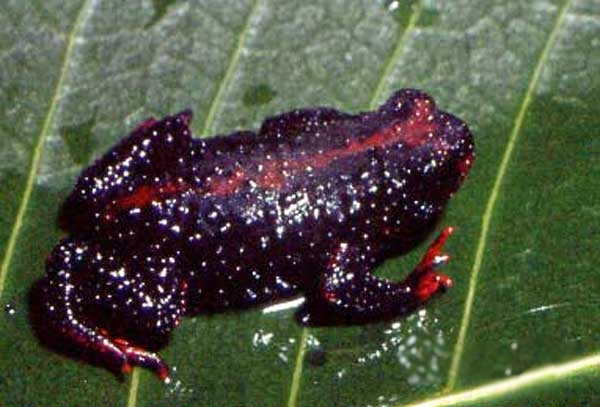

Conservation status
- Vulnerable (IUCN 3.1)

Scientific classification
- Kingdom: Animalia
- Phylum: Chordata
- Class: Amphibia
- Order: Anura
- Family: Bufonidae
- Genus: Melanophryniscus
- Species: M. dorsalis

Binomial name
- Melanophryniscus dorsalis (Mertens, 1933)

Synonyms
- Dendrophryniscus stelzneri ssp. dorsalis Mertens, 1933; Melanophryniscus stelzneri ssp. dorsalis (Mertens, 1933)

= Melanophryniscus dorsalis =

Species of amphibian

Melanophryniscus dorsalis is a species of toad in the family Bufonidae which is endemic to the coastal Brazil. It is threatened by habitat loss. Its natural habitats are subtropical or tropical sand dunes and nearby areas. It breeds in temporary pools.
