= Jacinto Machado =

Coordinates: 29°00′S 49°46′W

- Municipality
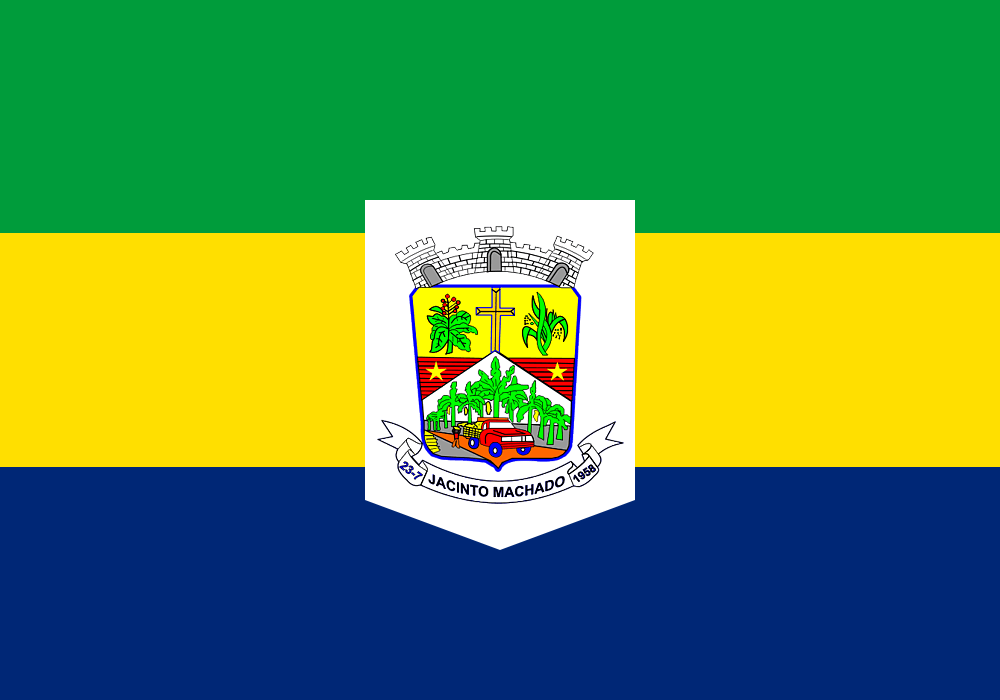
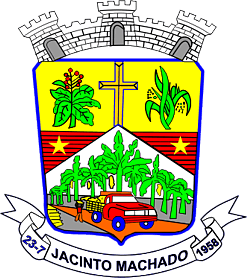
- Flag Coat of arms
- Interactive map of Jacinto Machado
- Country: Brazil
- Region: South
- State: Santa Catarina
- Mesoregion: Sul Catarinense

Population (2020)
  - Total: 10,376
- Time zone: UTC -3
- Website: jacintomachado.sc.gov.br

Jacinto Machado is a municipality in the state of Santa Catarina in the South region of Brazil.

== See also ==
- List of municipalities in Santa Catarina
