= Capixaba =

Capixaba may refer to:

== Places ==
- Capixaba, Acre, a municipality in the state of Acre, Brazil
- Capixaba, the demonym for the state of Espírito Santo, Brazil

== Organizations ==
- Campeonato Capixaba, the football league of the state of Espírito Santo, Brazil

== Species ==
- Blabicentrus capixaba, a species of beetle
- Cerithiopsis capixaba, a species of sea snail
- Chiasmocleis capixaba, a species of frog
- Neoregelia capixaba, a bromeliad species in the genus Neoregelia

== Food ==
- Moqueca Capixaba, a Brazilian moqueca stew from the Espírito Santo region, cooked in the traditional black clay capixaba pot

== People ==
- João Victor da Vitória Fernandes, known as Capixaba, Brazilian footballer
