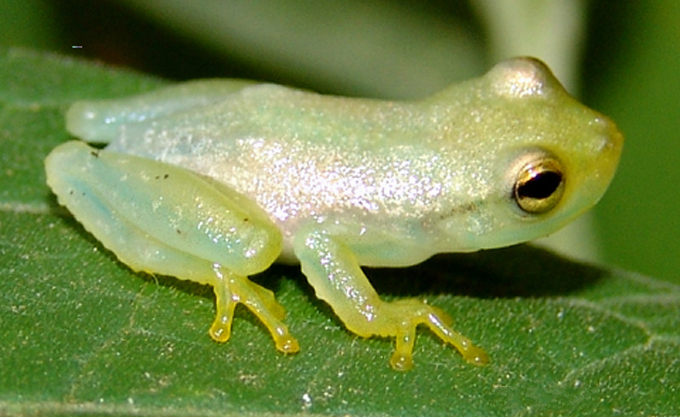
- Phyllodytes luteolus

Scientific classification
- Kingdom: Animalia
- Phylum: Chordata
- Class: Amphibia
- Order: Anura
- Family: Hylidae
- Subfamily: Hylinae
- Genus: Phyllodytes; Wagler, 1830

Type species
- Hyla luteola Wied-Neuwied, 1824

Species
- 12, see text.

Synonyms
- Amphodus Peters, 1873 "1872"; Lophyohyla Miranda-Ribeiro, 1923

= Phyllodytes =

Genus of amphibians

Phyllodytes is a genus of frogs (heart-tongued frogs) in the family Hylidae. It is endemic to eastern Brazil.

== Taxonomy ==
Based on genetic evidence, genus Phytotriades was erected in 2009 to remedy polyphyly of Phyllodytes as then defined. It remains to be elucidated which Phyllodytes species, apart from Phytotriades (=Phyllodytes) auratus, the type species of the genus Phytotriades, might belong to Phytotriades instead of Phyllodytes. With Phytotriades auratus from Trinidad and Venezuela placed in its own genus, the remaining Phyllodytes species are all endemic to Brazil.

== Description ==
These are small arboreal frogs which live and breed exclusively on epiphytic bromeliad plants. They have large odontoids ("fangs") on the dentaries. Male Phyllodytes do vocalize, in contrast to Phytotriades.

== Species ==
This genus includes 14 species:

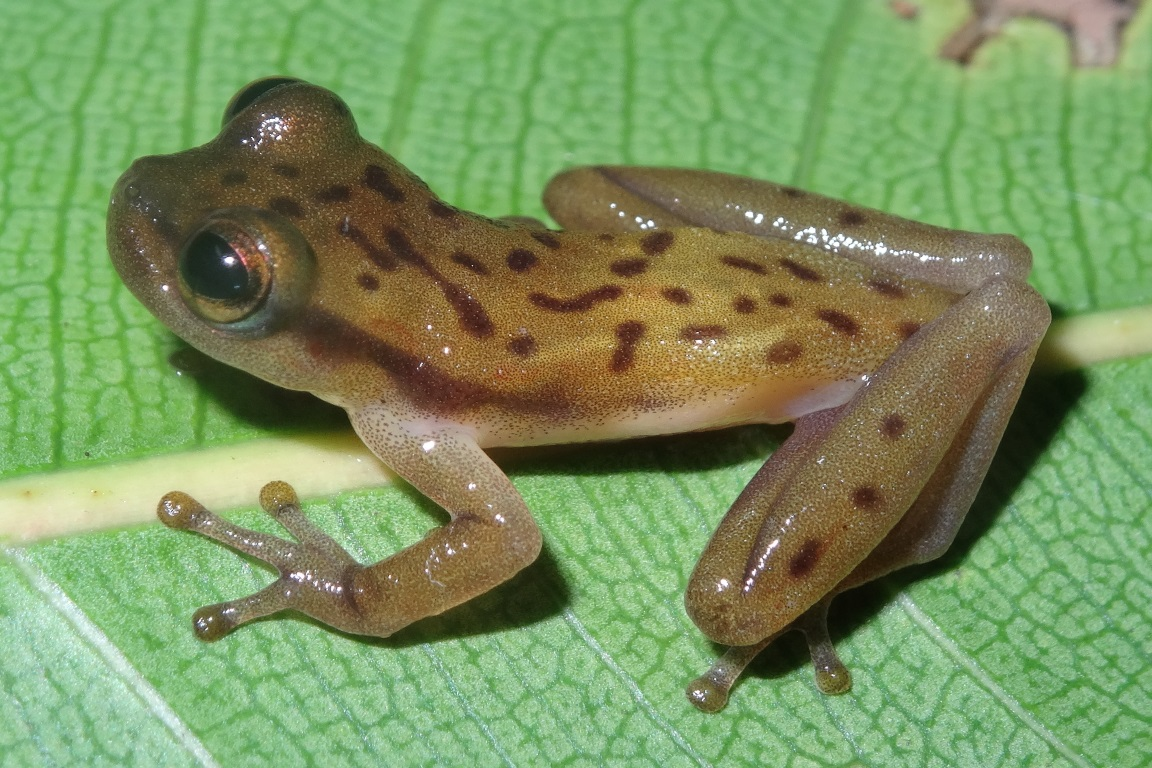
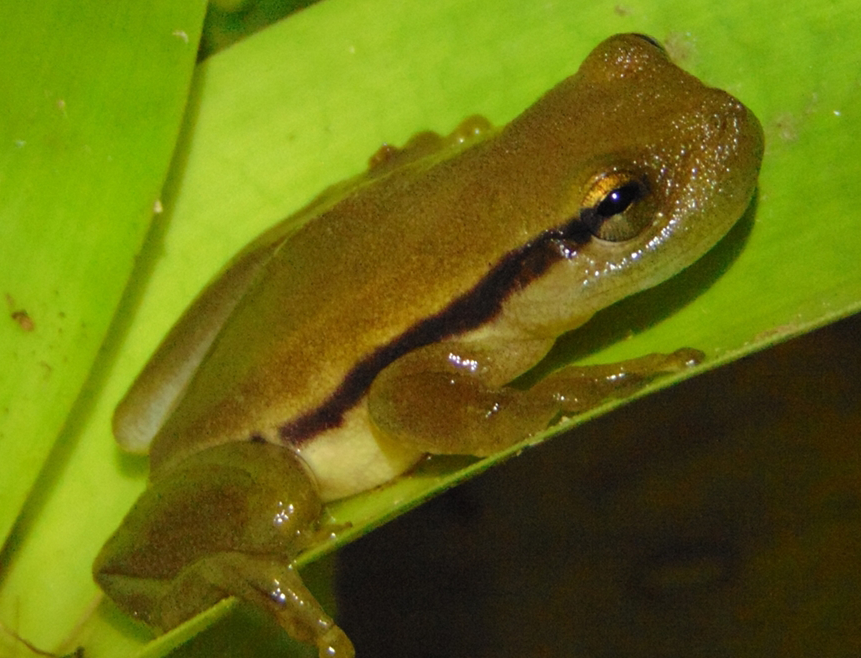
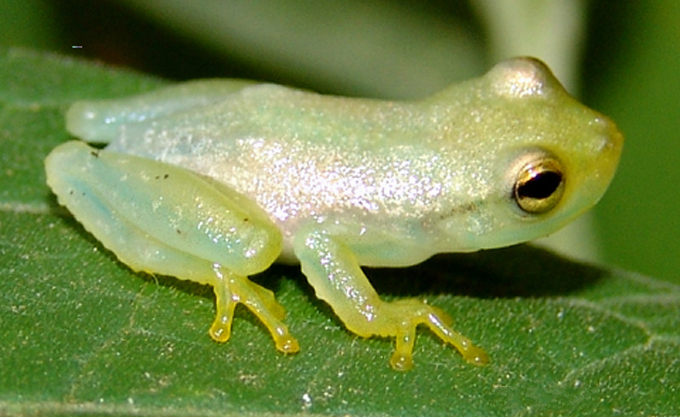
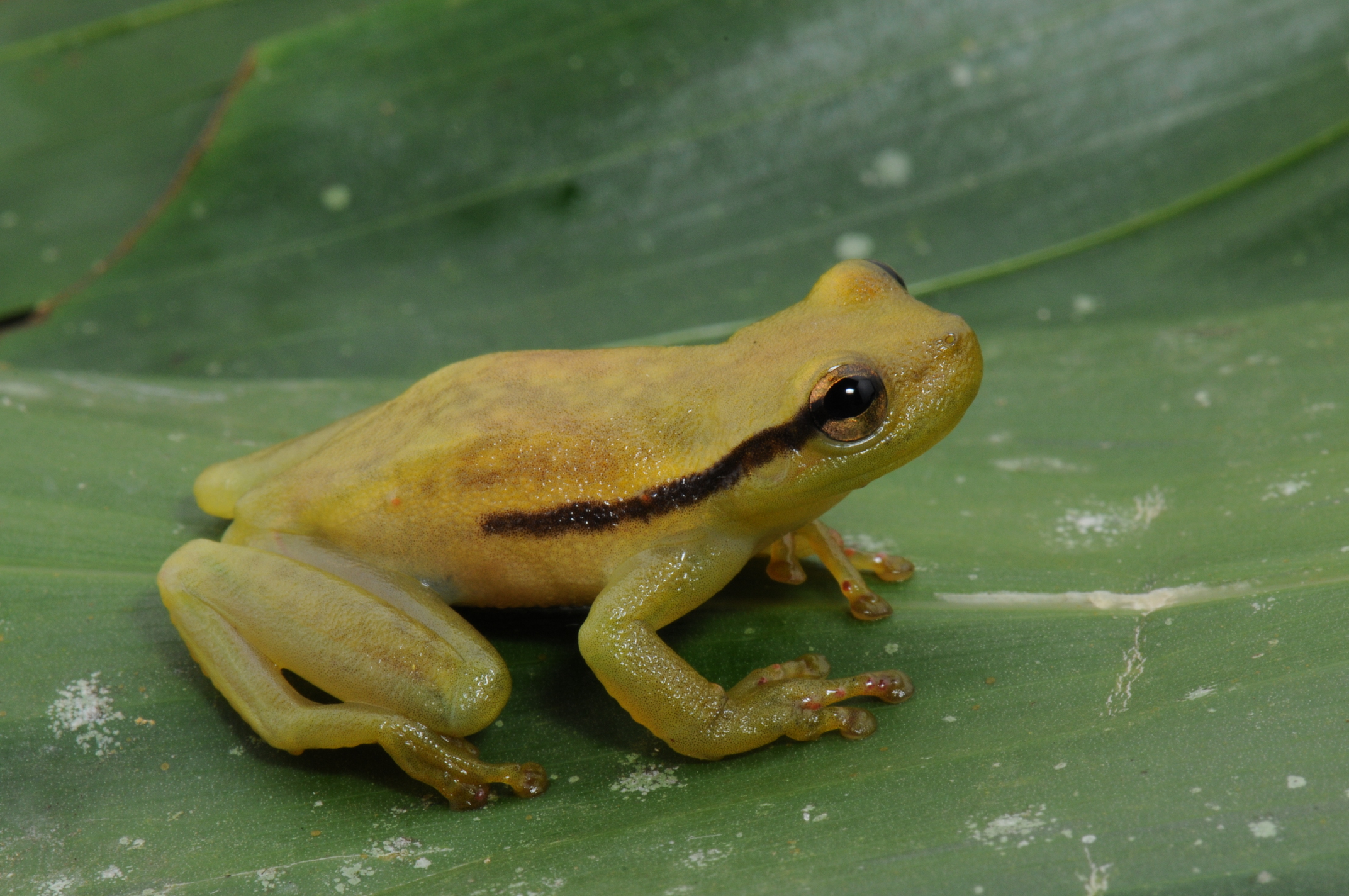
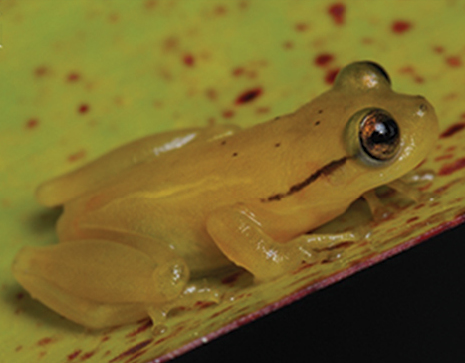
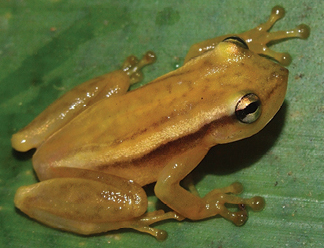
Image	Binomial name and author	Common name
	Phyllodytes acuminatus Bokermann, 1966	Alagoas heart-tongued frog
	Phyllodytes amadoi Vörös, Dias, and Solé, 2017
	Phyllodytes brevirostris Peixoto & Cruz, 1988	Alhandra heart-tongued frog
	Phyllodytes edelmoi Peixoto, Caramaschi & Freire, 2003
	Phyllodytes gyrinaethes Peixoto, Caramaschi & Freire, 2003
	Phyllodytes kautskyi Peixoto & Cruz, 1988	Brazilian heart-tongued frog
	Phyllodytes luteolus Wied-Neuwied, 1824	yellow heart-tongued frog
	Phyllodytes maculosus Cruz, Feio & Cardoso, 2007
	Phyllodytes megatympanum Marciano, Lantyer-Silva & Solé, 2017
	Phyllodytes melanomystax Caramaschi, da Silva & Britto-Pereira, 1992	Bahia heart-tongued frog
	Phyllodytes praeceptor Orrico, Dias, and Marciano, 2018
	Phyllodytes punctatus Caramaschi & Peixoto, 2004
	Phyllodytes tuberculosus Bokermann, 1966	Maracas heart-tongued frog
	Phyllodytes wuchereri Peters, 1873

AmphibiaWeb continues to include Phytotriades auratus in this genus.
