= Chiasmocleis bicegoi =

Scientific classification
- Kingdom: Animalia
- Phylum: Chordata
- Class: Amphibia
- Order: Anura
- Family: Microhylidae
- Genus: Chiasmocleis
- Species: C. bicegoi

Binomial name
- Chiasmocleis bicegoi Miranda-Ribeiro, 1920

Synonyms
- Chiasmocleis (Chiasmocleis) bicegoi de Sá, Tonini, van Huss, Long, Cuddy, Forlani, Peloso, Zaher, and Haddad, 2018

Species of frog

Chiasmocleis bicegoi, the Cecilia humming frog or Santa Cecilia humming frog, is a frog in the family Microhylidae. It is endemic to Brazil. Scientists have only collected it with certainty from its type locality, but they believe it to be more widespread.

Scientists used to consider this frog part of Chiasmocleis albopunctata, but it was placed in its own taxon in 2018.
