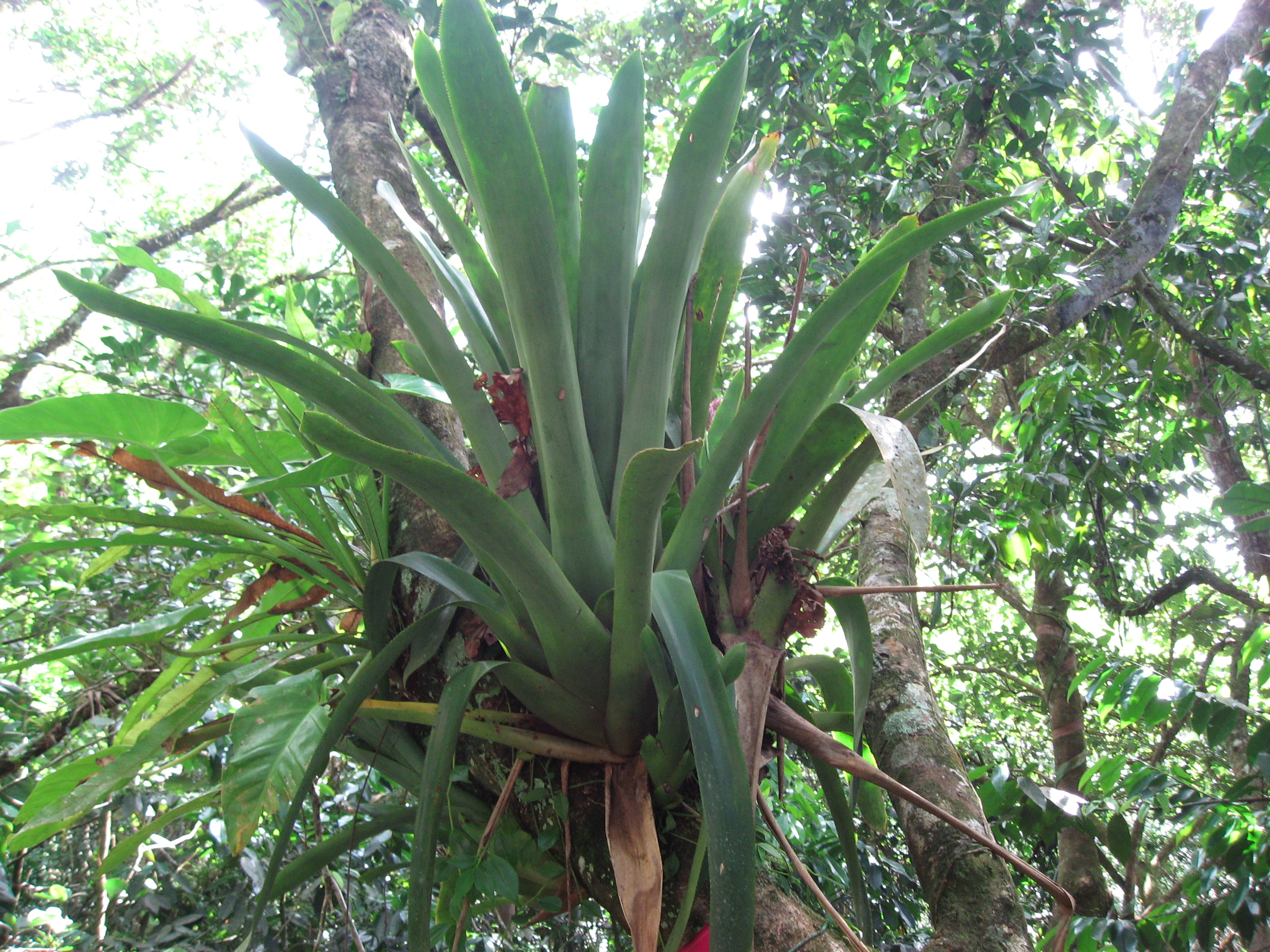
- Glomeropitcairnia penduliflora

Scientific classification
- Kingdom: Plantae
- Clade: Embryophytes
- Clade: Tracheophytes
- Clade: Spermatophytes
- Clade: Angiosperms
- Clade: Monocots
- Clade: Commelinids
- Order: Poales
- Family: Bromeliaceae
- Subfamily: Tillandsioideae
- Genus: Glomeropitcairnia; Mez

= Glomeropitcairnia =

Genus of flowering plants

Glomeropitcarnia is a genus of the botanical family Bromeliaceae, subfamily Tillandsioideae. The genus name is from the Latin “glomero” (to form into a ball) and the genus Pitcairnia. It has two known species, native to Venezuela, Trinidad and the Lesser Antilles.

== Taxonomy ==
This plant group had been classified as a genera within the Pitcairnioideae subfamily, but modern cladistic and DNA analysis has revealed them as a member of Tillandsioideae, most closely related to the Guzmania and Mezobromelia genera. The only two species of this plant described to date are G. penduliflora and G. erectiflora, both common to the Caribbean. Among tank bromeliads they are noted as being able to store the most water, up to five gallons, providing a water source for other biota (with special reference to the environmentally sensitive El Tucuche Golden Tree Frog - Phytotriades auratus ).

== Species ==
Image	Scientific name	Distribution
	Glomeropitcairnia erectiflora Mez	Trinidad, Venezuela (including Venezuelan Antilles)
	Glomeropitcairnia penduliflora (Grisebach) Mez	Lesser Antilles
