= Maracas heart-tongued frog =

Conservation status
- Vulnerable (IUCN 3.1)

Scientific classification
- Kingdom: Animalia
- Phylum: Chordata
- Class: Amphibia
- Order: Anura
- Family: Hylidae
- Genus: Phyllodytes
- Species: P. tuberculosus

Binomial name
- Phyllodytes tuberculosus Bokermann, 1966

Species of amphibian

The Maracas heart-tongued frog (Phyllodytes tuberculosus) is a species of frog in the family Hylidae endemic to Brazil. Its natural habitats are subtropical or tropical dry forests, dry savanna, and moist savanna. This frog has been observed between 900 and 1350 meters above sea level.

This frog has been found in terrestrial bromeliad plants that grow on the rocks. Its tadpoles develop in pools of water that collects in these plants.

Scientists have given this species a tentative classification of "vulnerable to extinction." This frog has a large range, but that range is heavily fragmented, and still subject to change and degradation by humans.

The large-scale conversion of this frog's habitat to sericulture, farmland, and grazing space has left this frog at greater risk of fire and the destruction of its bromeliads.

This frog resembles Phyllodytes luteolus closely, such that they can be mistaken for one another.
