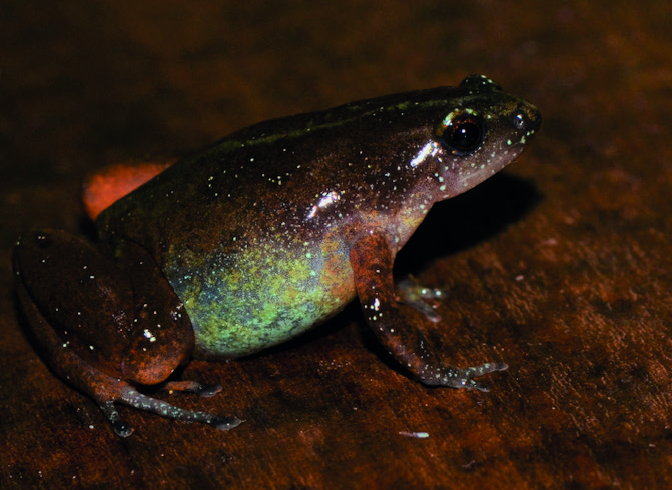
- Amapá, Brazil

Conservation status
- Least Concern (IUCN 3.1)

Scientific classification
- Kingdom: Animalia
- Phylum: Chordata
- Class: Amphibia
- Order: Anura
- Family: Microhylidae
- Genus: Chiasmocleis
- Species: C. hudsoni

Binomial name
- Chiasmocleis hudsoni Parker, 1940
- Range as known in 2004. The species is now known to occur in Colombia and more widely in Brazil.

Synonyms
- Syncope hudsoni (Parker, 1940)

= Chiasmocleis hudsoni =

Species of frog native to South America

Chiasmocleis hudsoni, also known as Hudson's humming frog, is a species of frog in the family Microhylidae. It is found in French Guiana, Suriname, Guyana, Guianan Venezuela, Colombia (Amazonas), and Amazonian Brazil.

Chiasmocleis jimi has been included in this species but the most recent genetic analyses support its recognition as a distinct species; both species might include further distinct lineages that warrant recognition as species.

== Etymology ==
The specific name hudsoni honours C. A. Hudson, the collector of the holotype and a collector for the Natural History Museum, London.

== Description ==
Adult males measure 14–23 mm (0.6–0.9 in) and adult females 17–28 mm (0.7–1.1 in) in snout–vent length. The body is robust and ovoid. The head is much narrower than the body; the snout is rounded. All but the first finger are fringed; no webbing is present. The finger tips are rounded and fingers 2–3 are swollen and may present discs. The toes are slightly fringed but have no webbing. Toes 2–4 have terminal discs. The dorsum is purple brown with variable lighter markings. The snout can be white.

Males may possess few but large dermal spines on the chin. The male advertisement call is a repetitive series of multi-pulsed notes.

== Habitat and conservation ==
Chiasmocleis hudsoni is a common species living in tropical rainforests at elevations below 300 m (980 ft). It is a nocturnal, fossorial frog, usually hiding in holes or in the leaf litter. It is an "explosive breeder" using temporary pools for breeding. It is locally threatened by habitat loss caused by clear-cutting. However, it is not threatened overall, and it is present in several protected areas.
