= El Tucuche =

Mountain in Trinidad and Tobago

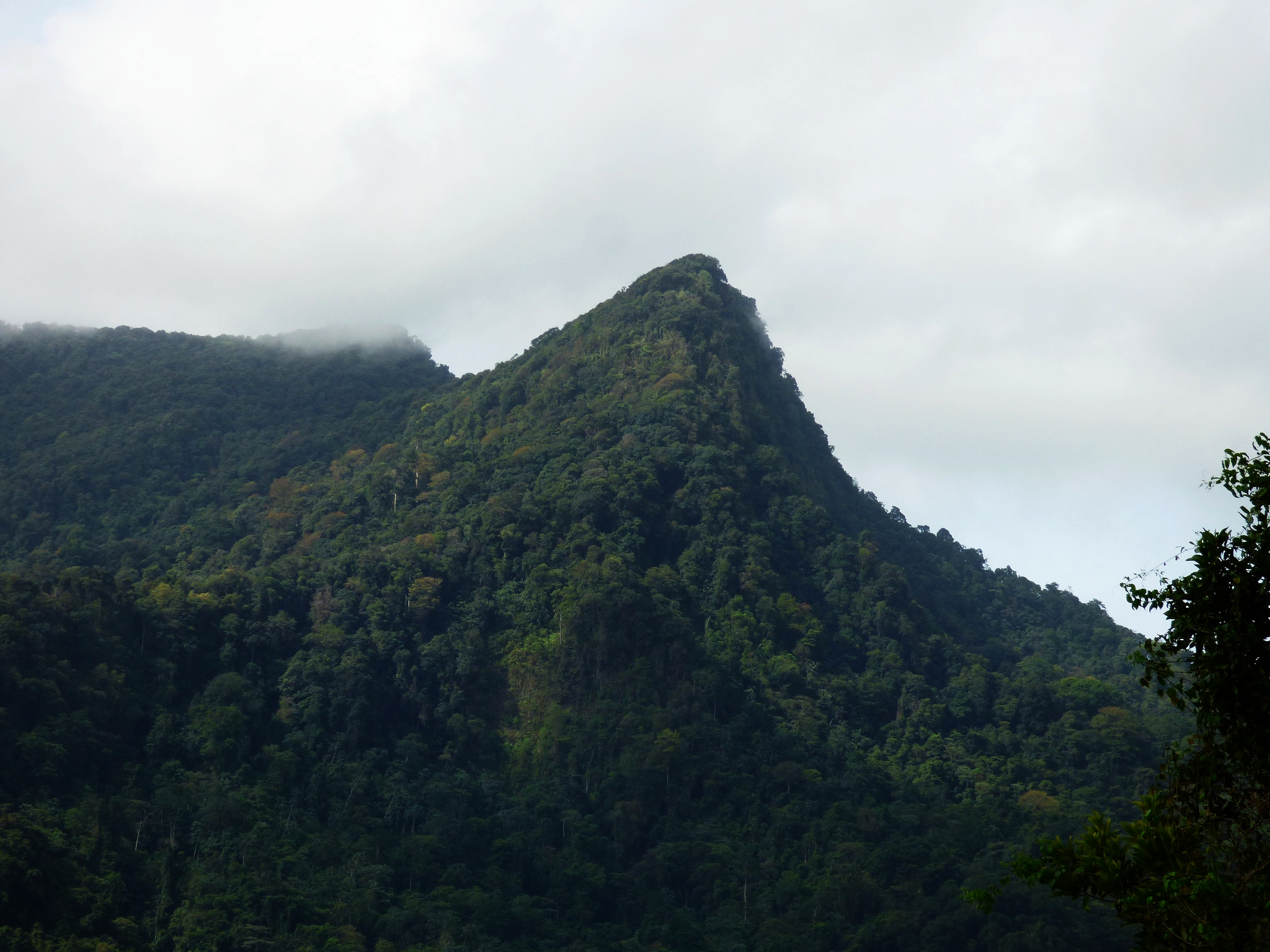
- El Tucuche

Highest point
- Elevation: 936 m (3,071 ft)
- Prominence: 526 m (1,726 ft)
- Listing: Country high point
- Coordinates: 10°44′00″N 61°25′00″W

Geography
- Location within Trinidad and Tobago
- Location: Maracas Valley, Tunapuna–Piarco, Trinidad
- State: Trinidad and Tobago
- Parent range: Northern Range

El Tucuche (936 m) is the second highest peak in Trinidad's Northern Range and is noted for its interesting pyramidal shape. It is fabled in Amerindian lore as a sacred mountain. There are Amerindian petroglyphs on a rock outcrop below the mountain. These are the only petroglyphs in the country known to archaeologists.

Its summit is home to the golden tree frog (Phytotriades auratus). On the summit of El Tucuche, elfin woodland can be found. The vegetation is usually gnarled and short, due to the high elevation, exposure to clouds and prevailing winds. At the foot of the mountain lies the village of Lluengo, home to approximately 2,000 residents.

Wildlife on El Tucuche includes animals such as the El Tucuche Golden Tree Frog (Phytotriades auratus), the Red Brocket Deer, the Fer-de-lance (Bothrops atrox), the Bearded Bellbird, the Orange-winged Amazon Parrot, the White-bearded Manakin, the Trinidad Stream Frog (Mannophryne trinitatis) and the Emperor Morpho Butterfly (Morpho peleides) to name just a few. Notable vegetation on the higher slopes includes mosses, tree-ferns and bromeliads (including Glomeropitcairnia erectiflora - the microhabitat of the El Tucuche Golden Tree Frog); and Heliconias on the lower to middle slopes. Old abandoned Cocoa estates that are reverting to forest occur in some areas of the lower slopes. The nation's highest waterfall, Maracas falls, lies at the foothills of El Tucuche, and is 91.5 meters (300 feet) high.

El Tucuche is often climbed by hikers. There are two summits, the first summit ascends to above 2,000 feet (610 meters) and displays a 1000 feet sheer-vertical cliff. The second and highest summit is at over 3,000 feet (910 meters) and is pyramid-shaped. When clouds are not present, the nation's capital, Port Of Spain, the Caroni Swamp and Main Ridge can be viewed from the summit. The mountain also has views of Maracas Beach.

== See also ==
- El Cerro del Aripo
