= Chiasmocleis lacrimae =

Conservation status
- Endangered (IUCN 3.1)

Scientific classification
- Kingdom: Animalia
- Phylum: Chordata
- Class: Amphibia
- Order: Anura
- Family: Microhylidae
- Genus: Chiasmocleis
- Species: C. lacrimae

Binomial name
- Chiasmocleis lacrimae Peloso, Sturaro, Forlani, Gaucher, Motta, and Wheeler, 2014

Synonyms
- Chiasmocleis carvalhoi Cruz, Caramaschi, and Izecksohn, 1997; Chiasmocleis (Chiasmocleis) lacrimae de Sá, Tonini, van Huss, Long, Cuddy, Forlani, Peloso, Zaher, and Haddad, 2018

Species of frog

Chiasmocleis lacrimae, the central humming frog, is a frog in the family Microhylidae. It is endemic to Brazil, where it lives in lowland forest habitats.
