= Phyllodytes punctatus =

Conservation status
- Endangered (IUCN 3.1)

Scientific classification
- Kingdom: Animalia
- Phylum: Chordata
- Class: Amphibia
- Order: Anura
- Family: Hylidae
- Genus: Phyllodytes
- Species: P. punctatus

Binomial name
- Phyllodytes punctatus (Caramaschi & Peixoto, 2004)

Species of amphibian

Phyllodytes punctatus is a species of frogs in the family Hylidae endemic to Brazil. People have seen it as high as 140 meters above sea level.

The adult frog measures about 18.2–22.8 mm long in snout-vent length. The skin of the dorsum is brown, and there are brown spots on the back and legs. This frog has a bump on its nose and three bumps on each eyelid.

Scientists list this frog as endangered because of its small remaining range, only 1,044 km2, which is still in some danger from urbanization and livestock cultivation. There is also some danger from harvesting of the bromeliad plants on which the frogs live, but this is limited in scope. Real estate speculation also threatens this frog.

This frog lives in places with white sandy soil and in shrubland. This frog lives on bromeliad plants that grow on native hosts. Scientists have only seen this frog in natural habitats, and not in disturbed areas such as farms or gardens.
