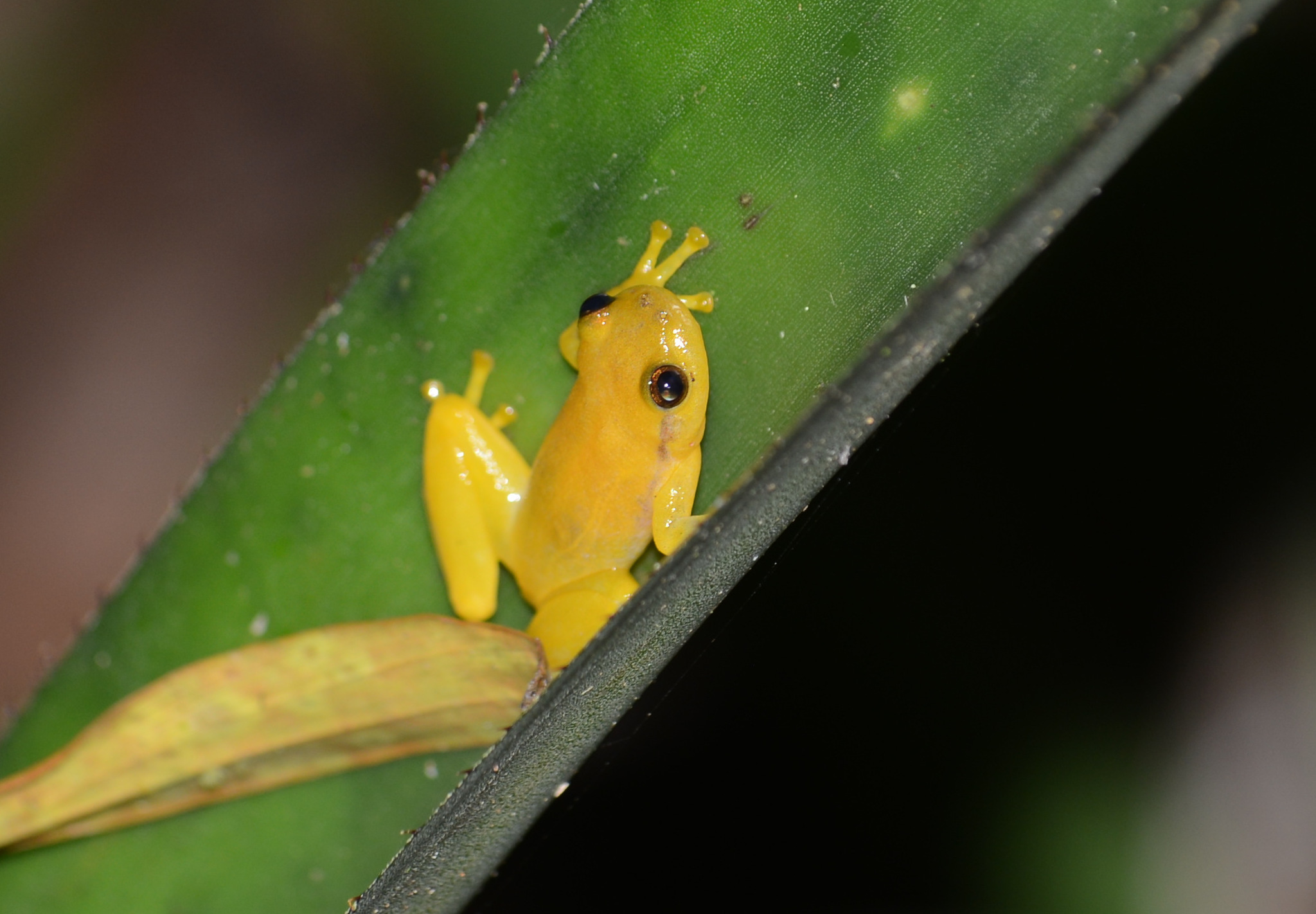

Conservation status
- Least Concern (IUCN 3.1)

Scientific classification
- Kingdom: Animalia
- Phylum: Chordata
- Class: Amphibia
- Order: Anura
- Family: Hylidae
- Genus: Phyllodytes
- Species: P. edelmoi

Binomial name
- Phyllodytes edelmoi (Peixoto, Caramaschi & Freire, 2003)

= Phyllodytes edelmoi =

Species of frog

Phyllodytes edelmoi is a species of frog in the family Hylidae endemic to Brazil. It has been observed as high as 650 meters above sea level.

This frog has been observed in forests and rocky ground near cliffs and on mountains. Scientists have seen it in terrestrial and bromeliad plants growing on trees.

The female frog lays eggs in the small pools of water that collect in the leaves of the bromeliads, where the tadpoles later hatch and swim. Scientists believe it might also live in bromeliads in people's gardens but this has not been confirmed.

This frog is not in endangered, which scientists say may be attributable to its ability to live in disturbed habitats.
