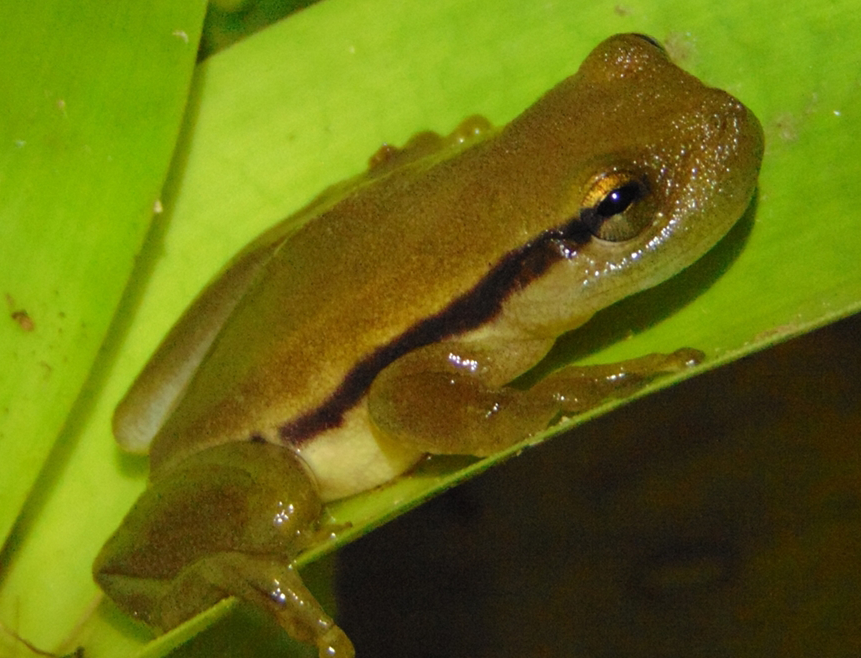

Conservation status
- Least Concern (IUCN 3.1)

Scientific classification
- Kingdom: Animalia
- Phylum: Chordata
- Class: Amphibia
- Order: Anura
- Family: Hylidae
- Genus: Phyllodytes
- Species: P. kautskyi

Binomial name
- Phyllodytes kautskyi Peixoto & Cruz, 1988

= Brazilian heart-tongued frog =

Species of amphibian

The Brazilian heart-tongued frog (Phyllodytes kautskyi) is a species of frog in the family Hylidae endemic to Brazil's Atlantic forests. It has been observed as high as 600 meters above sea level.

This frog is not classified as endangered because, although much of its habitat has been degraded by logging and deforestation, a very large area remains. Unlike some other frogs, this frog does not appear to live in degraded areas or in areas dedicated to silviculture. Scientists believe that this is because the frog's microhabitat involves slow-growing bromeliad plants. The tadpoles swim and grow in the pools of water that collect in the leaves.
