= Blabicentrus hirsutulus =

Scientific classification
- Domain: Eukaryota
- Kingdom: Animalia
- Phylum: Arthropoda
- Class: Insecta
- Order: Coleoptera
- Suborder: Polyphaga
- Infraorder: Cucujiformia
- Family: Cerambycidae
- Genus: Blabicentrus
- Species: B. hirsutulus

Binomial name
- Blabicentrus hirsutulus Bates, 1866

Species of beetle

Blabicentrus hirsutulus is a species of beetle in the family Cerambycidae. It was described by Bates in 1866. It is known to inhabit Brazil and French Guiana.
