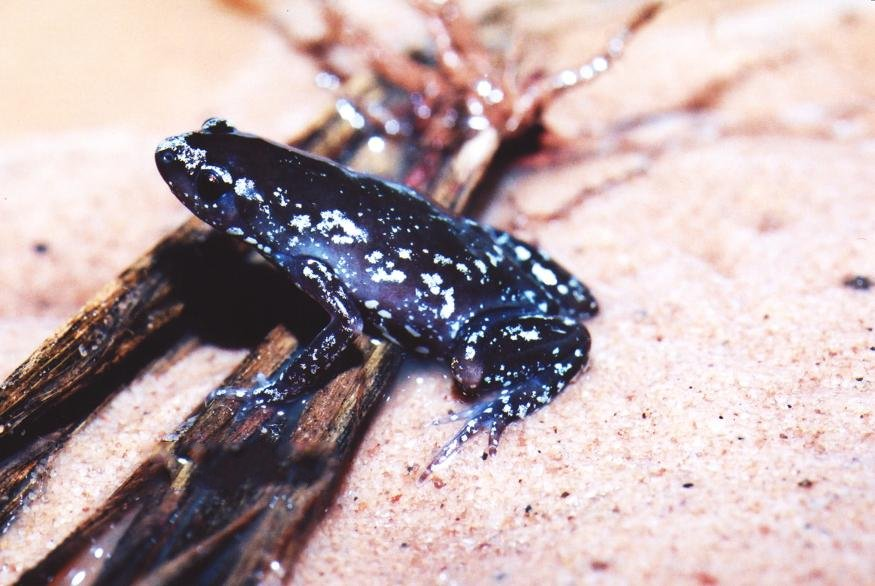
- Chiasmocleis albopunctata

Scientific classification
- Domain: Eukaryota
- Kingdom: Animalia
- Phylum: Chordata
- Class: Amphibia
- Order: Anura
- Family: Microhylidae
- Subfamily: Gastrophryninae
- Genus: Chiasmocleis; Méhelÿ, 1904

Type species
- Engystoma albopunctatum Boettger, 1885

Species
- 36 species (see text)

Synonyms
- Nectodactylus Miranda-Ribeiro, 1924; Syncope Walker, 1973; Unicus de Sá, Tonini, van Huss, Long, Cuddy, Forlani, Peloso, Zaher, and Haddad, 2019; Relictus de Sá, Tonini, van Huss, Long, Cuddy, Forlani, Peloso, Zaher, and Haddad, 2018 "2019" – preoccupied by Relictus Hubbs and Miller 1972; Relictocleis Dubois, Ohler, and Pyron, 2021

= Chiasmocleis =

Genus of amphibians

Chiasmocleis is a genus of microhylid frogs. They are found in tropical South America north and east of the Andes. Their common name is humming frogs or silent frogs, the latter referring to the formerly recognized Syncope.

== Taxonomy ==
There has been various attempts to delimit this genus in a way that would make it monophyletic. As of mid 2021, it is recognized as including the former Syncope, but consisting of three clades ranked as subgenera:

- Chiasmocleis Méhelÿ, 1904
- Syncope Walker, 1973
- Relictocleis Dubois, Ohler, and Pyron, 2021 (syn. Unicus, Relictus)

Of these, Relictocleis is the most divergent and may even be considered a separate, monotypic genus, with Relictocleis gnoma as its sole member.

== Description ==
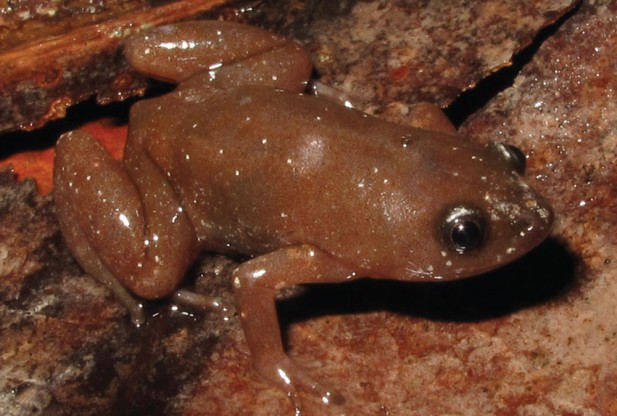
Chiasmocleis quilombola

Chiasmocleis are small-bodied frogs with small limbs. They are sexually dimorphic, with males having darker chin, abundant to no dermal spines, and variable degree of pedal webbing. Subgenus Syncope is characterized by size reduction and reduction or loss of phalanges and digits. Also Relictocleis are particularly small.

== Ecology ==
Chiasmocleis are fossorial or semi-fossorial and well camouflaged among the leaf litter or underground. They only forage on the surface for a few days during periods of explosive breeding at the beginning of the rainy season. They occur in both forested and open environments.

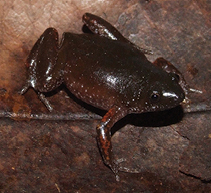
Chiasmocleis crucis

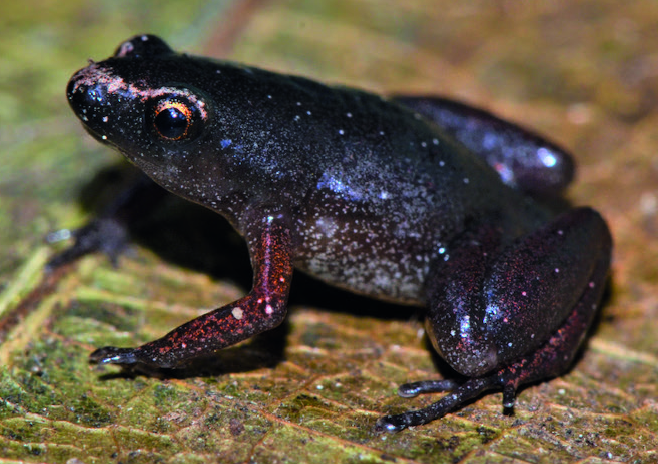
Chiasmocleis haddadi

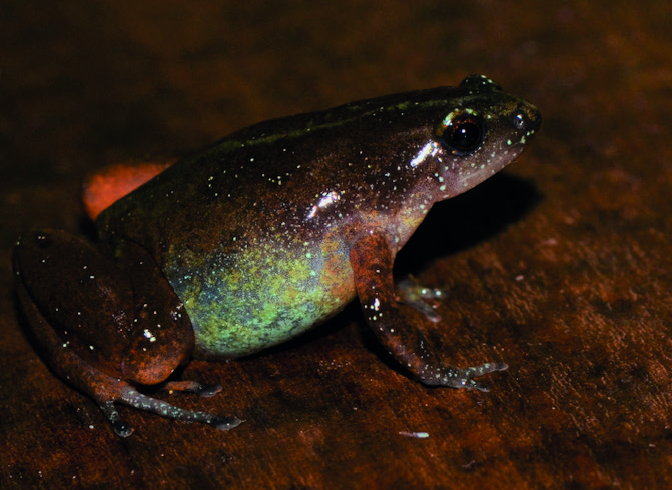
Chiasmocleis hudsoni

== Species ==
The following species are recognised in the genus Chiasmocleis:

- Chiasmocleis alagoana (Cruz, Caramaschi, and Freire, 1999)
- Chiasmocleis albopunctata (Boettger, 1885)
- Chiasmocleis altomontana (Forlani, Tonini, Cruz, Zaher, and de Sá, 2017)
- Chiasmocleis anatipes (Walker and Duellman, 1974)
- Chiasmocleis antenori (Walker, 1973)
- Chiasmocleis atlantica (Cruz, Caramaschi, and Izecksohn, 1997)
- Chiasmocleis avilapiresae (Peloso and Sturaro, 2008)
- Chiasmocleis bassleri (Dunn, 1949)
- Chiasmocleis bicegoi (Miranda-Ribeiro, 1920)
- Chiasmocleis capixaba (Cruz, Caramaschi, and Izecksohn, 1997)
- Chiasmocleis carvalhoi (Nelson, 1975)
- Chiasmocleis centralis (Bokermann, 1952)
- Chiasmocleis cordeiroi (Caramaschi and Pimenta, 2003)
- Chiasmocleis crucis (Caramaschi and Pimenta, 2003)
- Chiasmocleis devriesi (Funk and Cannatella, 2009)
- Chiasmocleis gnoma (Canedo, Dixo, and Pombal, 2004)
- Chiasmocleis haddadi (Peloso, Sturaro, Forlani, Gaucher, Motta, and Wheeler, 2014)
- Chiasmocleis hudsoni (Parker, 1940)
- Chiasmocleis jimi (Caramaschi and Cruz, 2001)
- Chiasmocleis lacrimae (Peloso, Sturaro, Forlani, Gaucher, Motta, and Wheeler, 2014)
- Chiasmocleis leucosticta (Boulenger, 1888)
- Chiasmocleis magnova (Moravec and Köhler, 2007)
- Chiasmocleis mantiqueira (Cruz, Feio, and Cassini, 2007)
- Chiasmocleis mehelyi (Caramaschi and Cruz, 1997)
- Chiasmocleis migueli (Forlani, Tonini, Cruz, Zaher, and de Sá, 2017)
- Chiasmocleis papachibe (Peloso, Sturaro, Forlani, Gaucher, Motta, and Wheeler, 2014)
- Chiasmocleis parkeri (Almendáriz C., Brito-M., Batallas-R., Vaca-Guerrero, and Ron, 2017)
- Chiasmocleis quilombola (Tonini, Forlani, and de Sá, 2014)
- Chiasmocleis royi (Peloso, Sturaro, Forlani, Gaucher, Motta, and Wheeler, 2014)
- Chiasmocleis sapiranga (Cruz, Caramaschi, and Napoli, 2007)
- Chiasmocleis schubarti (Bokermann, 1952)
- Chiasmocleis shudikarensis (Dunn, 1949)
- Chiasmocleis supercilialba (Morales and McDiarmid, 2009)
- Chiasmocleis tridactyla (Duellman and Mendelson, 1995)
- Chiasmocleis ventrimaculata (Andersson, 1945)
- Chiasmocleis veracruz (Forlani, Tonini, Cruz, Zaher, and de Sá, 2017
