= Chiasmocleis gnoma =

Conservation status
- Data Deficient (IUCN 3.1)

Scientific classification
- Kingdom: Animalia
- Phylum: Chordata
- Class: Amphibia
- Order: Anura
- Family: Microhylidae
- Genus: Chiasmocleis
- Species: C. gnoma

Binomial name
- Chiasmocleis gnoma Canedo, Dixo & Pombal, 2004

Species of frog

Chiasmocleis gnoma is a species of frog in the family Microhylidae. It is endemic to Brazil. Its natural habitats are subtropical or tropical moist lowland forests, intermittent freshwater marshes, and plantations . It is threatened by habitat loss.
