= Chiasmocleis centralis =

Conservation status
- Data Deficient (IUCN 3.1)

Scientific classification
- Kingdom: Animalia
- Phylum: Chordata
- Class: Amphibia
- Order: Anura
- Family: Microhylidae
- Genus: Chiasmocleis
- Species: C. centralis

Binomial name
- Chiasmocleis centralis Bokermann, 1952

Species of frog

Chiasmocleis centralis is a species of frog in the family Microhylidae. It is endemic to Brazil. Its natural habitats are moist savanna, subtropical or tropical moist shrubland, subtropical or tropical seasonally wet or flooded lowland grassland, intermittent freshwater marshes, and pastureland. It is threatened by habitat loss.
