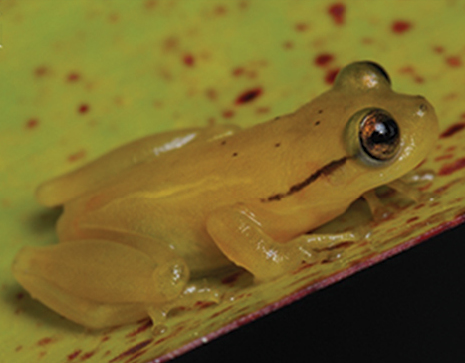

Conservation status
- Least Concern (IUCN 3.1)

Scientific classification
- Kingdom: Animalia
- Phylum: Chordata
- Class: Amphibia
- Order: Anura
- Family: Hylidae
- Genus: Phyllodytes
- Species: P. praeceptor

Binomial name
- Phyllodytes praeceptor Orrico, Dias, and Marciano, 2018

= Phyllodytes praeceptor =

Species of amphibian

Phyllodytes praeceptor is a species of frog in the family Hylidae endemic to coastal areas in the state of Bahia in Brazil. It has also been seen in Serra da Jiboia, 694 m (2,277 ft) above sea level.

The adult male frog measures 20.7–25.8 mm (0.81–1.02 in) in snout-vent length. This frog has prominent eyes.

This frog lives on epiphytic bromeliad plants. The female frog lays eggs on the leaves and the tadpoles swim in the water that collects near the axil.

This frog is not endangered. Scientists attribute it to its large range. Although the closed-canopy Atlantic forest where it lives was subject to considerable deforestation over the past century, there is still a considerable space left, and the rate of deforestation has slowed. This frog lives in forests where the branches of the trees come together like a roof. Farmers often grow cacao under thinned forest that provide natural shade for the cacao plants, and the frogs have been found in these farms as well, another reason why their population is stable. Scientists believe collection of the bromeliad plants might pose some risk to this frog if it were to happen, but they note that this does not seem to be the case as of 2021.
