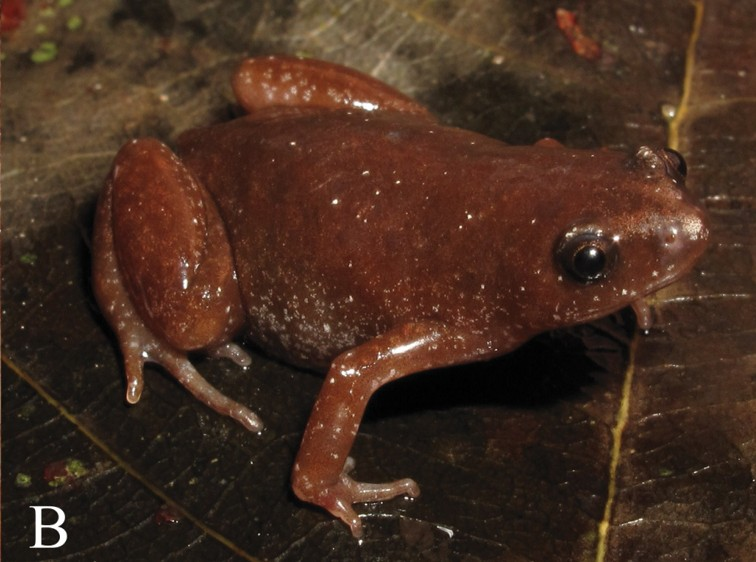
- Female C. quilombola

Scientific classification
- Domain: Eukaryota
- Kingdom: Animalia
- Phylum: Chordata
- Class: Amphibia
- Order: Anura
- Family: Microhylidae
- Genus: Chiasmocleis
- Species: C. quilombola

Binomial name
- Chiasmocleis quilombola Tonini, Forlani, and de Sá, 2014

= Chiasmocleis quilombola =

Species of amphibian

Chiasmocleis quilombola is a species of frogs in the family Microhylidae. It is endemic to southeastern Brazil and found between the Doce River and the Mucuri River in the state of Espírito Santo. The specific name quilombola is derived from quilombo, the name for a Brazilian community founded by escaped slaves.

== Description ==
Males in the type series measure 14–17 mm (0.6–0.7 in) and the sole female 17 mm (0.7 in) in snout–vent length. The body is ovoid with a triangular head and small, protruding eyes; the snout is rounded. The tympanum is indistinct. Fingers are slightly fringed but not webbed. Toes are fringed and slightly webbed. The skin is smooth and lacking dermal spines. Coloration is dark brown with cream-colored spots. Throat is black and belly is cream colored. Males have vocal slits.

== Habitat and conservation ==
Chiasmocleis quilombola has been collected with pitfall traps after heavy rains near a permanent lagoon and a temporary swamp. The area has mostly sandy soils and consists of secondary forests and plantations, with few remnants of primary Atlantic Forest.

Chiasmocleis quilombola occurs in an area of strong human pressure. It is threatened by habitat loss. It is known from some protected areas, including its type locality, Rio Preto National Forest.
