= Chiasmocleis atlantica =

Conservation status
- Least Concern (IUCN 3.1)

Scientific classification
- Kingdom: Animalia
- Phylum: Chordata
- Class: Amphibia
- Order: Anura
- Family: Microhylidae
- Genus: Chiasmocleis
- Species: C. atlantica

Binomial name
- Chiasmocleis atlantica (Cruz, Caramaschi & Izecksohn, 1997)

Species of frog

Chiasmocleis atlantica is a species of frog in the family Microhylidae. It is endemic to Brazil. Its natural habitats are subtropical or tropical moist lowland forests and intermittent freshwater marshes. It is threatened by habitat loss.
