= Blabicentrus bella =

Scientific classification
- Domain: Eukaryota
- Kingdom: Animalia
- Phylum: Arthropoda
- Class: Insecta
- Order: Coleoptera
- Suborder: Polyphaga
- Infraorder: Cucujiformia
- Family: Cerambycidae
- Genus: Blabicentrus
- Species: B. bella

Binomial name
- Blabicentrus bella (Galileo & Martins, 2004)

Synonyms
- Ceiupaba bella Galileo & Martins, 2004

Species of beetle

Blabicentrus bella is a species of beetle in the family Cerambycidae. It was described by Galileo and Martins in 2004 and is known from Bolivia, Ecuador, and French Guiana.
