= Blabicentrus =

Scientific classification
- Kingdom: Animalia
- Phylum: Arthropoda
- Clade: Pancrustacea
- Class: Insecta
- Order: Coleoptera
- Suborder: Polyphaga
- Infraorder: Cucujiformia
- Family: Cerambycidae
- Subfamily: Lamiinae
- Genus: Blabicentrus

Genus of beetles

Blabicentrus is a genus of longhorn beetles of the subfamily Lamiinae, containing the following species:

- Blabicentrus bella (Galileo & Martins, 2004)
- Blabicentrus brulei Dalens, Touroult & Tavakilian, 2009
- Blabicentrus capixaba (Martins & Galileo, 1998)
- Blabicentrus ghoutii Dalens, Touroult & Tavakilian, 2009
- Blabicentrus hirsutulus Bates, 1866
- Blabicentrus littoralis Dalens, Touroult & Tavakilian, 2009
- Blabicentrus martinsi Dalens, Touroult & Tavakilian, 2009
- Blabicentrus tomentosus Dalens, Touroult & Tavakilian, 2009
