= Phyllodytes gyrinaethes =

Conservation status
- Vulnerable (IUCN 3.1)

Scientific classification
- Kingdom: Animalia
- Phylum: Chordata
- Class: Amphibia
- Order: Anura
- Family: Hylidae
- Genus: Phyllodytes
- Species: P. gyrinaethes

Binomial name
- Phyllodytes gyrinaethes (Peixoto, Caramaschi & Freire, 2003)

Species of amphibian

Phyllodytes gyrinaethes is a species of frogs in the family Hylidae endemic to Brazil. Its natural habitat is subtropical or tropical moist lowland forests. It has been observed as high as 710 meters above sea level.

This frog spends time on the ground and on bromeliads, both those that grow on trees and those on the ground. They tend to prefer a height range of 0.8–10.0 meters off the ground. These frogs tend to prefer smaller plants, and scientists have observed multiple adults and tadpoles on the same one.

Scientists have found this frog in the remnants of forests. They cite habitat fragmentation as the principal threat, specifically urbanization, agriculture, logging, and the collection of the bromeliad plants upon which the frogs depend.
