= Chiasmocleis alagoana =

Conservation status
- Data Deficient (IUCN 3.1)

Scientific classification
- Kingdom: Animalia
- Phylum: Chordata
- Class: Amphibia
- Order: Anura
- Family: Microhylidae
- Genus: Chiasmocleis
- Species: C. alagoana

Binomial name
- Chiasmocleis alagoana Cruz, Caramaschi, and Freire, 1999

Synonyms
- Chiasmocleis alagoanus Cruz, Caramaschi, and Freire, 1999

Species of amphibian

Chiasmocleis alagoana is a species of frogs in the family Microhylidae. It is endemic to remnants of the Atlantic rainforest in the states of Alagoas, Paraíba, and Pernambuco in north-eastern Brazil. The specific name alagoana refers to Alagoas, the state where this species was first found.

== Description ==
Males measure 22.7–23.4 mm (0.89–0.92 in) (based on just two specimens in the type series) and females 22.5–27.8 mm (0.89–1.09 in) in snout–vent length. The body is ovoid with short head. The snout is short and truncate in dorsal and rounded in lateral view. No tympanum is visible. The arms are slender whereas the legs are short and robust. The fingers have no webbing but the toes have basal webbing; both are slightly fringed. Skin is smooth. Alcohol-preserved specimens are dorsally uniformly dark brown and ventrally roughly marbled in dark brown and pale cream. A light mid-dorsal line is present in some individuals.

== Habitat and conservation ==
Chiasmocleis alagoana occurs in remnants of the Atlantic rainforest near sea level (the Pernambuco record is from 153 m (502 ft) above sea level). It is found in both primary and secondary forest. It lives in leaf litter and under fallen palm leaves, preferably in humid sites. It is assumed to be an explosive breeder utilizing temporary ponds. Habitat loss is probable major threat to this species.
