= Dendropsophus araguaya =

Conservation status
- Data Deficient (IUCN 3.1)

Scientific classification
- Kingdom: Animalia
- Phylum: Chordata
- Class: Amphibia
- Order: Anura
- Family: Hylidae
- Genus: Dendropsophus
- Species: D. araguaya

Binomial name
- Dendropsophus araguaya (Napoli & Caramaschi, 1998)

Species of amphibian

Dendropsophus araguaya is a species of frogs in the family Hylidae.

It is endemic to Brazil. Its natural habitats are moist savanna, subtropical or tropical moist shrubland, subtropical or tropical high-altitude shrubland, freshwater marshes, and intermittent freshwater marshes. It is threatened by habitat loss.
