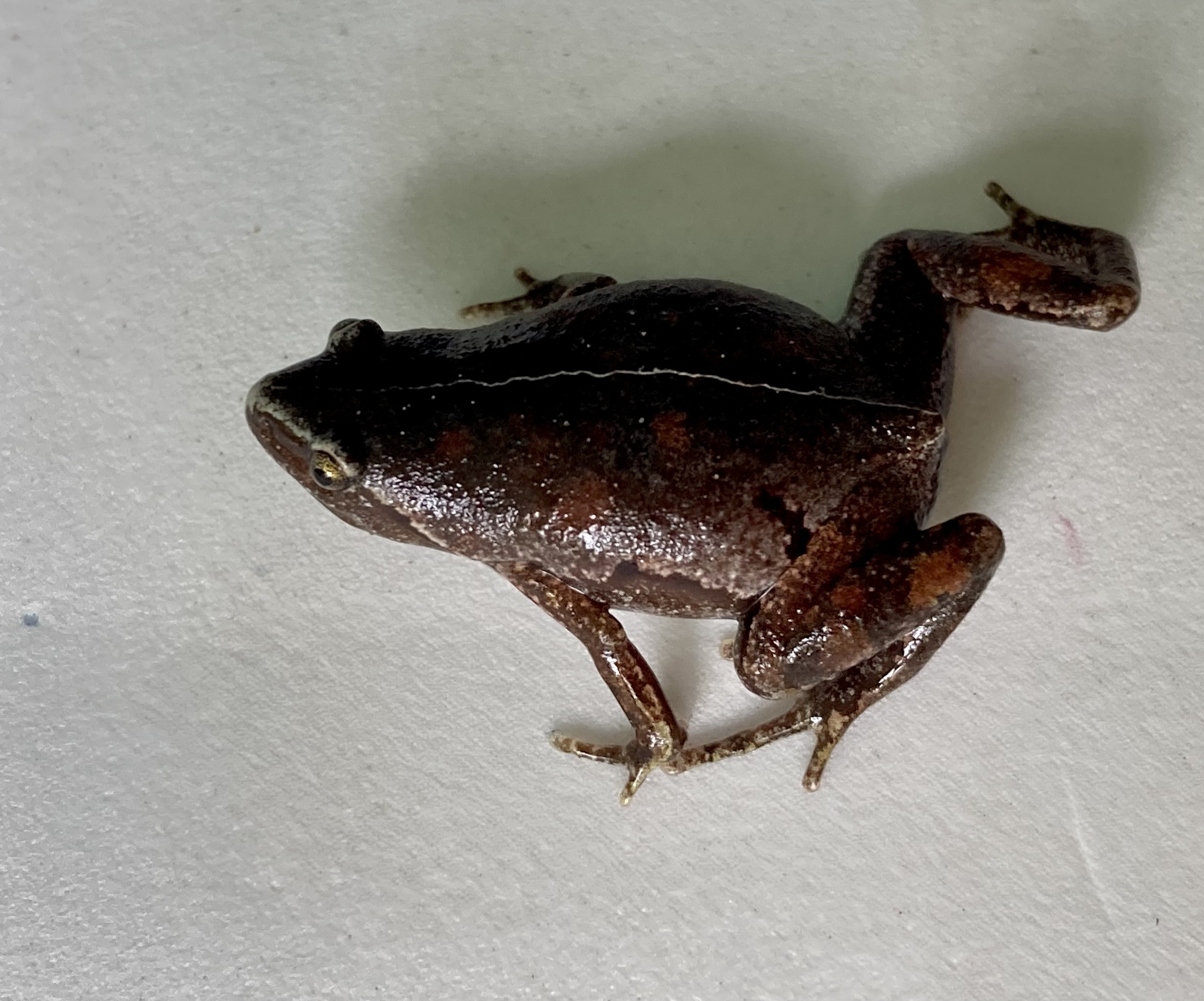

Conservation status
- Least Concern (IUCN 3.1)

Scientific classification
- Kingdom: Animalia
- Phylum: Chordata
- Class: Amphibia
- Order: Anura
- Family: Microhylidae
- Genus: Chiasmocleis
- Species: C. bassleri

Binomial name
- Chiasmocleis bassleri (Dunn, 1949)

Synonyms
- Syncope bassleri Dunn, 1949

= Chiasmocleis bassleri =

Species of frog

Chiasmocleis bassleri is a species of frog in the family Microhylidae. It is found in the Amazon biome of Brazil, Colombia, Ecuador, Peru, and Bolivia. The specific name bassleri honors Harvey Bassler, an American geologist and paleontologist. Common name Bassler's humming frog has been proposed for this species.

== Description ==
Chiasmocleis bassleri are relatively small frogs: males measure about 15–20 mm (0.59–0.79 in) and females about 21–26 mm (0.83–1.02 in) in snout–vent length. Male frogs can be heard calling from under wet leaf litter, near pond edges. The call consists of many sporadically emitted, short multi-pulsed notes (3–6 pulses).

== Habitat ==
Chiasmocleis bassleri is an abundant and widespread species in suitable habitats. It is found in terra firma primary and secondary tropical rainforest and in seasonally flooded forest. They usually occur near isolated pools, hiding under leaves or pieces of bark.

Chiasmocleis bassleri is adversely impacted by habitat loss due to forest clearing.
