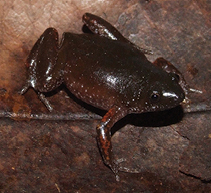
- Specimen from the Serra Bonita Private Reserve of Natural Heritage

Conservation status
- Data Deficient (IUCN 3.1)

Scientific classification
- Kingdom: Animalia
- Phylum: Chordata
- Class: Amphibia
- Order: Anura
- Family: Microhylidae
- Genus: Chiasmocleis
- Species: C. crucis

Binomial name
- Chiasmocleis crucis Caramaschi and Pimenta, 2003

= Chiasmocleis crucis =

Species of frog

Chiasmocleis crucis is a species of frog in the family Microhylidae. It is endemic to Bahia in eastern Brazil. It is known from Camamu, its type locality, and from the Serra Bonita Private Reserve of Natural Heritage in Camacan/Pau Brasil. The specific name crucis honors Carlos Alberto Gonçalves da Cruz, a Brazilian herpetologist.

== Description ==
Six adult males in the type series measure 19–20 mm (0.7–0.8 in) in snout–vent length. The body is ovoid in shape. The snout is short. No tympanum is present. The fingers lack webbing. The hind limbs are robust and the toes have some webbing. Preserved specimens are uniformly dark brown. Some specimens may have a thin vertebral line, but it is incomplete in others. The lower parts are cream-colored with darker marbling. Males have a small subgular vocal sac.

The male advertisement call consists of multi-pulsed notes produced in series lasting 6–14 seconds. Each call has 33–77 notes with dominant frequency of 4069–4435 Hz.

== Habitat and conservation ==
The type series was collected in a temporary pool at 120 m (390 ft) above sea level. The pool was located within tropical forest consisting of a mix of early secondary growth and good cover forest. The Serra Bonita population was found during breeding in a temporary pond inside a fragment of Atlantic Forest and in a larger pond on the banks of a dirt road across an agroforestry system consisting of cocoa and native shade trees.

As of 2004, threats to this species were unknown. One population is found in the Serra Bonita Private Reserve of Natural Heritage.
