= Chiasmocleis mehelyi =

Conservation status
- Data Deficient (IUCN 3.1)

Scientific classification
- Kingdom: Animalia
- Phylum: Chordata
- Class: Amphibia
- Order: Anura
- Family: Microhylidae
- Genus: Chiasmocleis
- Species: C. mehelyi

Binomial name
- Chiasmocleis mehelyi (Caramaschi & Cruz, 1997)

Species of frog

Chiasmocleis mehelyi is a species of frog in the family Microhylidae. It is endemic to Brazil. Its natural habitats are moist savanna, subtropical or tropical moist shrubland, subtropical or tropical seasonally wet or flooded lowland grassland, intermittent freshwater marshes, and pastureland. It is threatened by habitat loss.
