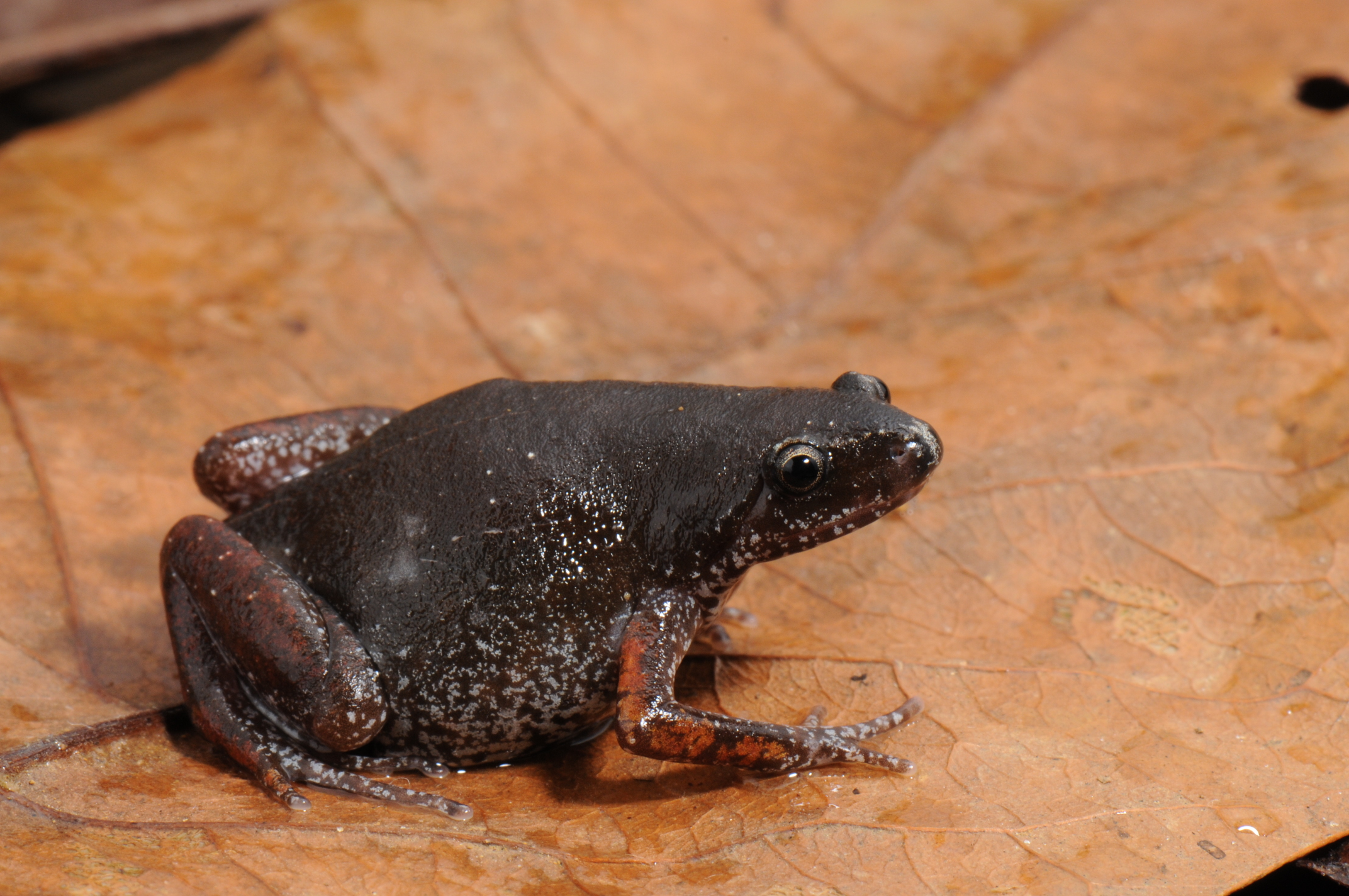
- Specimen found in Bahia

Conservation status
- Least Concern (IUCN 3.1)

Scientific classification
- Kingdom: Animalia
- Phylum: Chordata
- Class: Amphibia
- Order: Anura
- Family: Microhylidae
- Genus: Chiasmocleis
- Species: C. schubarti

Binomial name
- Chiasmocleis schubarti Bokermann, 1952

= Chiasmocleis schubarti =

Species of frog

Chiasmocleis schubarti is a species of frog in the family Microhylidae. It is endemic to Brazil, found in the states of Espírito Santo, Minas Gerais, and Bahia. Its natural habitats are subtropical or tropical moist lowland forests and intermittent freshwater marshes. It is threatened by habitat loss.

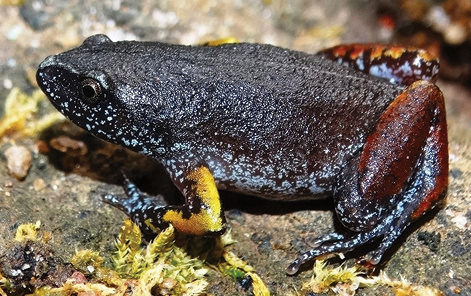
C. schubarti found in Espírito Santo, Brazil
