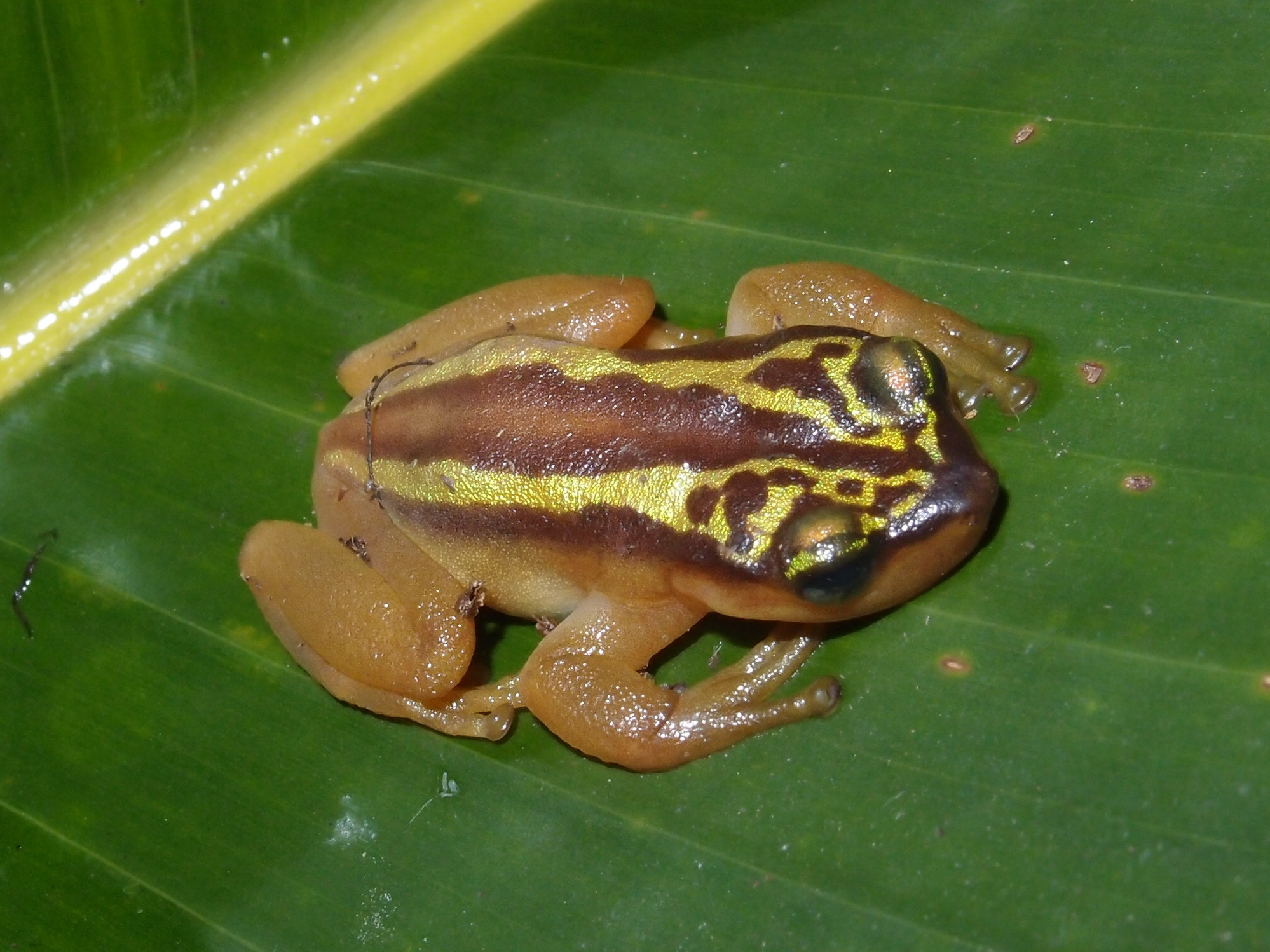

Conservation status
- Endangered (IUCN 3.1)

Scientific classification
- Kingdom: Animalia
- Phylum: Chordata
- Class: Amphibia
- Order: Anura
- Family: Hylidae
- Subfamily: Lophyohylinae
- Genus: Phytotriades; Jowers et al., 2009
- Species: P. auratus

Binomial name
- Phytotriades auratus (Boulenger, 1917)

Synonyms
- Amphodus auratus Boulenger, 1917; Phyllodytes auratus (Boulenger, 1917)

= Phytotriades =

Genus of amphibians

Phytotriades is a genus of tree frogs in the family Hylidae. As currently delimited, the genus is monotypic and contains Phytotriades auratus, commonly known as the golden tree frog, bromeliad-dwelling treefrog, El Tucuche golden tree frog, or Trinidad heart-tongued frog.

== Taxonomy ==
Phytotriades was separated from the genus Phyllodytes based primarily on genetic evidence; this also solved the unusual, disjunct distribution of the genus (the remaining Phyllodytes are endemic to eastern Brazil). Nevertheless, the contents of the genus remain to be elucidated. Earlier on, also Phyllodytes wuchereri was included in the "Phyllodytes auratus group", but the position of this species has not been addressed. At the moment, it is not clear which Phyllodytes species might eventually end up in this genus.

AmphibiaWeb continues to include Phytotriades auratus in Phyllodytes.

== Distribution ==
Phytotriades auratus is known from the summits of El Cerro del Aripo and El Tucuche, the two highest peaks in Trinidad, as well as from Cerro Humo on the Paria Peninsula, Venezuela, on the adjacent mainland. There is circumstantial evidence suggesting that the species might also occur (or have occurred) on the Isla Margarita.

== Description ==
Males grow to 29 mm (1.1 in) and females to 35 mm (1.4 in) in snout–vent length. They have serrated teeth and sharp "fangs", larger in males than in females, on their mandibles. The dorsum is chocolate brown in colour and has two iridescent, golden yellow stripes.

Males are territorial and can use their fangs in combat. Males are not known to call (this feature separates Phytotriades from Phyllodytes). Fecundity is probably low, with maximally 5–6 tadpoles found in a single bromeliad tank. The tadpoles hatch at a length of 14 mm (0.55 in) and grow to 40 mm (1.6 in).

== Habitat and conservation ==
On Trinidad, the species occurs in montane rainforest and elfin woodland at around 940 m (3,080 ft) above sea level. On Cerro Humo, the species was found in the elfin forest near the summit of the mountain (1,250 m (4,100 ft)). Phytotriades auratus is closely associated with the giant bromeliad Glomeropitcairnia erectiflora; also the tadpoles develop in these bromeliads.

Trinidadian populations are threatened by the collection of bromeliads and collecting of specimens. The Northern Range Game Sanctuary (also known as the El Tucuche Reserve) provides some protection to one of the populations. On Cerro Humo, a part of the habitat falls within the Península de Paria National Park, although enforcement remains limited. Clearance for slash-and-burn plots threatens the potential habitat of the species on the slopes of the mountain. The species appears to be specialized for life in high humidity relatively cool tropical montane forests on isolated mountain crests and peaks. With the threat of global climate change, and specifically warming, temperatures are expected to rise even in mountainous regions. This seems likely to result in the uphill retreat of cool-adapted tropical montane forests and the shrinking of the already small range of this frog.
