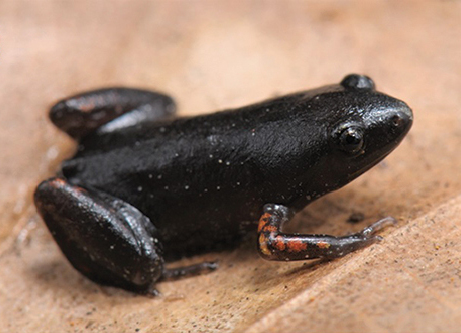
- Chiasmocleis cordeiroi

Conservation status
- Data Deficient (IUCN 3.1)

Scientific classification
- Kingdom: Animalia
- Phylum: Chordata
- Class: Amphibia
- Order: Anura
- Family: Microhylidae
- Genus: Chiasmocleis
- Species: C. cordeiroi

Binomial name
- Chiasmocleis cordeiroi Caramaschi and Pimenta, 2003

= Chiasmocleis cordeiroi =

Species of frog

Chiasmocleis cordeiroi is a species of frog in the family Microhylidae. It is endemic to Bahia in eastern Brazil. It is known from Camamu, its type locality, and from few other localities on both sides of the De Contas River. The specific name cordeiroi honors Paulo Henrique Chaves Cordeiro, a Brazilian biologist. Common name Cordeiro's humming frog has been coined for this species.

== Description ==
The type series consists of two adult males measuring 20–22 mm (0.8–0.9 in) in snout–vent length. The body is ovoid in shape. The snout is short. No tympanum is present. The fingers lack webbing. The hind limbs are robust and the toes have well-developed webbing. Preserved specimens are uniformly dark brown. The lower parts are cream-colored with fine, darker marbling. Males have a small subgular vocal sac.

The male advertisement call consists of multi-pulsed notes produced in series lasting 1.3–27 seconds. Each call has 9–182 notes with dominant frequency of 4500–4898 Hz.

== Habitat and conservation ==
The type series was collected in a temporary pool at 120 m (390 ft) above sea level. The pool was located within tropical forest consisting of a mix of early secondary growth and good cover forest. Another population was found during breeding event in a temporary pond where hundreds of males were heard calling. The pond was located inside a rubber plantation next to an Atlantic Forest fragment.

As of 2004, threats to this species were unknown. One population is found in the Michelin Ecological Reserve, Igrapiúna.
