= Blabicentrus ghoutii =

Scientific classification
- Domain: Eukaryota
- Kingdom: Animalia
- Phylum: Arthropoda
- Class: Insecta
- Order: Coleoptera
- Suborder: Polyphaga
- Infraorder: Cucujiformia
- Family: Cerambycidae
- Genus: Blabicentrus
- Species: B. ghoutii

Binomial name
- Blabicentrus ghoutii Dalens, Touroult & Tavakilian, 2009

Species of beetle

Blabicentrus ghoutii is a species of beetle in the family Cerambycidae. It was described by Dalens, Touroult and Tavakilian in 2009. It is known from Guyana.
