= Glomeropitcairnia penduliflora =

Scientific classification
- Kingdom: Plantae
- Clade: Tracheophytes
- Clade: Angiosperms
- Clade: Monocots
- Clade: Commelinids
- Order: Poales
- Family: Bromeliaceae
- Genus: Glomeropitcairnia
- Species: G. penduliflora

Binomial name
- Glomeropitcairnia penduliflora (Griseb.) Mez

Species of flowering plant

Glomeropitcairnia penduliflora is a very large tank bromeliad native to the islands of Martinique and Dominica in the Lesser Antilles. The tank can be as much as 2.5 m (8 ft 2 in) wide and up to 1.8 m (5 ft 11 in) high, up from the middle of which comes an inflorescence up to 3 m (9.8 ft) height. According to Newman, the tank can hold as much as 114 L (25 imp gal; 30 US gal) of rainwater.
