= Chiasmocleis anatipes =

Conservation status
- Least Concern (IUCN 3.1)

Scientific classification
- Kingdom: Animalia
- Phylum: Chordata
- Class: Amphibia
- Order: Anura
- Family: Microhylidae
- Genus: Chiasmocleis
- Species: C. anatipes

Binomial name
- Chiasmocleis anatipes Walker and Duellman, 1974

Species of frog

Chiasmocleis anatipes is a species of frog in the family Microhylidae. As currently known, it is endemic to northeastern Ecuador, but it is likely to occur also in adjacent parts of Peru and perhaps Colombia too. The specific name anatipes refers to the "duck-like" feet of this frog, characterized by extensive webbing between the toes. Common name Santa Cecilia humming frog has been proposed for this species.

== Description ==
Adult males measure 18–924 mm (0.7–36.4 in) and adult females, based on a single specimen, about 25 mm (1.0 in) in snout–vent length. The body is moderately slender. The snout is rounded. The tympanum is concealed. All but the first finger are fringed; no webbing is present. The toes are fringed and extensively webbed, but may be less developed in females. Males have spines on the chin. Both sexes have many dermal spines on the dorsum and cloacal region. The dorsum is dull olive-green to dull brown with green and/or gold metallic flecks. The upper arms are tan or orange-colored. The ventral coloration is cream with large, dark brown irregular spots or blotches.

== Habitat and conservation ==
Chiasmocleis anatipes occurs in lowland primary forest at elevations of 200–400 m (660–1,310 ft) above sea level. Specimens have been found in or near semi-permanent ponds. Breeding takes place in temporary ponds. This cryptic species is believed to be relatively widespread. It can suffer locally from habitat loss. It is found in the Yasuní National Park and the Jatun Sacha Biological Station.
