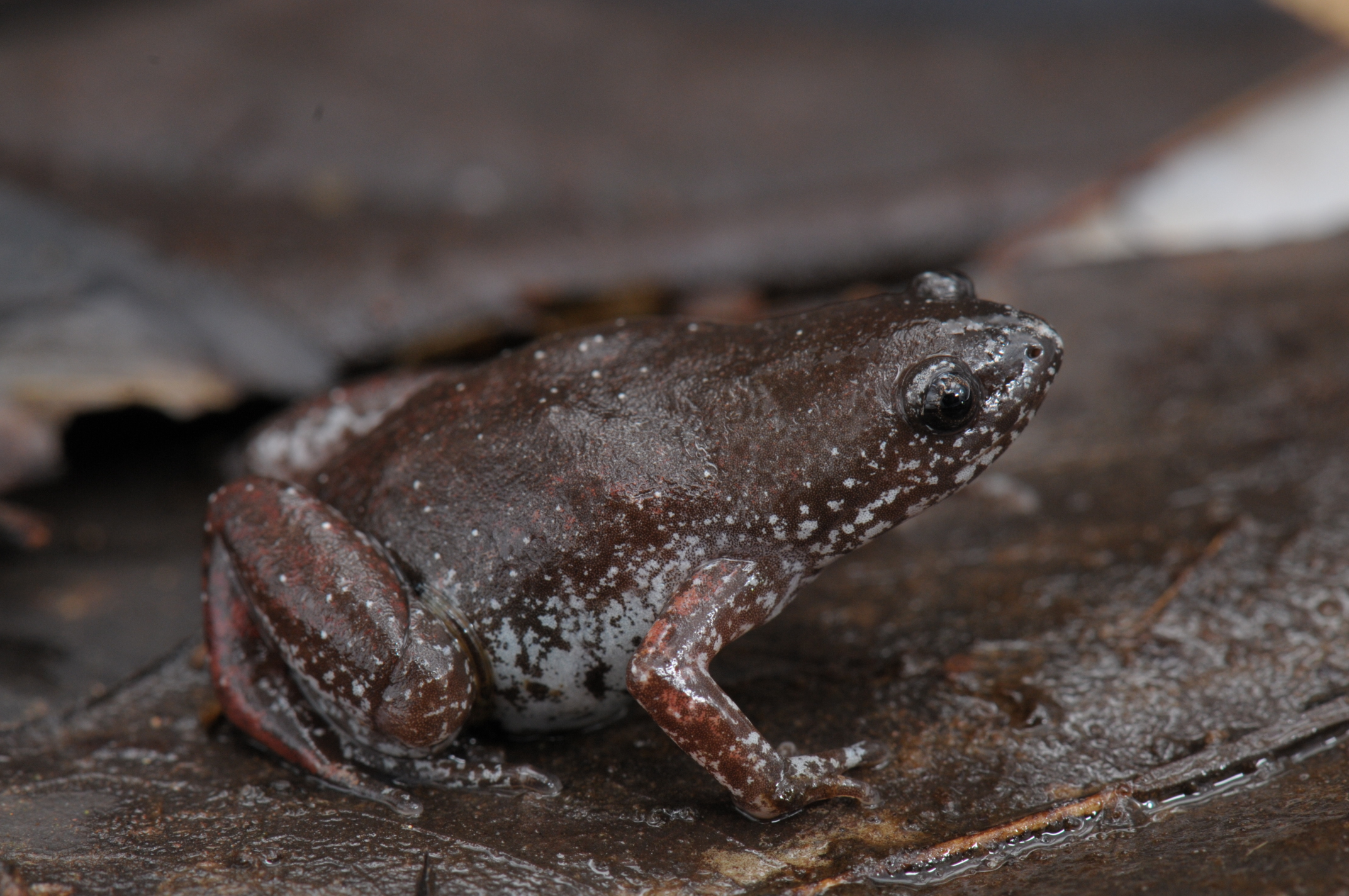

Conservation status
- Least Concern (IUCN 3.1)

Scientific classification
- Kingdom: Animalia
- Phylum: Chordata
- Class: Amphibia
- Order: Anura
- Family: Microhylidae
- Genus: Chiasmocleis
- Species: C. leucosticta

Binomial name
- Chiasmocleis leucosticta (Boulenger, 1888)

= Chiasmocleis leucosticta =

Species of frog

Chiasmocleis leucosticta is a species of frog in the family Microhylidae. It is endemic to Brazil. Its natural habitats are subtropical or tropical moist lowland forests and intermittent freshwater marshes. It is threatened by habitat loss.
