= Phyllodytes megatympanum =

Conservation status
- Least Concern (IUCN 3.1)

Scientific classification
- Kingdom: Animalia
- Phylum: Chordata
- Class: Amphibia
- Order: Anura
- Family: Hylidae
- Genus: Phyllodytes
- Species: P. megatympanum

Binomial name
- Phyllodytes megatympanum Marciano, Lantyer-Silva, and Solé, 2017

Species of frog

Phyllodytes megatympanum is a frog in the family Hylidae endemic to Brazil. It has been observed between 90 and 95 meters above sea level.

The skin of the frog's dorsum is light brown with yellow coloration around the groin. This frog has a large, visible tympanum.

This frog has been observed on epiphytic bromeliad plants. In some parts of Brazil, it also lives in shrubby habitats. The male frog sits 2 to 10 meters above the ground and calls to the female frogs. The female frog lays eggs on the bromeliad leaves. When they hatch, the tadpoles fall into the water that collects in the bromeliad, where it swims and develops.

This frog is not in danger of extinction because it has such a large range. Although Brazil has seen significant deforestation as the land was converted to subsistence agriculture and grazing, this appears to have slowed considerably and there is considerable habitat remaining. Also, there has been some significant silviculture, which may be suitable for some kinds of frogs. Scientists note the frog could be in danger if humans collect the bromeliads, but they do not believe this is actually happening to this frog as of 2023.
