= Reticulated humming frog =

Conservation status
- Least Concern (IUCN 3.1)

Scientific classification
- Kingdom: Animalia
- Phylum: Chordata
- Class: Amphibia
- Order: Anura
- Family: Microhylidae
- Genus: Chiasmocleis
- Species: C. royi

Binomial name
- Chiasmocleis royi Peloso, Sturaro, Forlani, Gaucher, Motta, and Wheeler, 2014

Synonyms
- Chiasmocleis royi (Peloso, Sturaro, Forlani, Gaucher, Motta, and Wheeler, 2014); Chiasmocleis (Chiasmocleis) royi (de Sá, Tonini, van Huss, Long, Cuddy, Forlani, Peloso, Zaher, and Haddad, 2018)

Species of frog

Chiasmocleis royi, the reticulated humming frog, is a frog endemic to Bolivia, Brazil, and Peru. This frog often shares burrows with tarantulas in what may be a mutualistic or commensalistic symbiosis.

== Habitat and threats ==
This frog lives in lowland forests on flood plains. It has been observed between 200 and 530 meters above sea level. Scientists believe it breeds through larval development.

The IUCN classifies this frog as least concern of extinction because of its large range, where it is very common. What threat it faces comes from habitat loss, often associated with mining, and pollution related to that mining. Because much of its range is flood plain, it may be more vulnerable to pollution than otherwise. Said range includes protected parks in all three countries: Manu National Park, Tambopata National Reserve, Parque Estadual Guajará-Mirim, Reserva Extrativista Rio Pacaás Novas, Reserva Extrativista Chico Mendes, Parque Nacional Madidi, Reserva Manuripi, Reserva de Biosfera Estación Biológica del Beni, and Parque Nacional Isiboro Sécure.

== Tarantulas ==
Scientists have seen this frog emerging from the same burrows or holes in trees as tarantulas in the genus Pamphobeteus. Both species are nocturnal. The spiders eat other frogs but not reticulated humming frogs.

Scientists think the tarantulas use pheromones to tell which frog is which. They have seen young tarantulas catch and pick up small reticulated humming frogs in the same posture as when catching frogs to eat. The tarantulas touch the reticulated humming frogs with their mouths and then put them back down without biting them. Microhylid frogs, like the reticulated humming frog, make chemicals in their skin that taste bad. Scientists think this might be why the frogs and spiders started living together.

Scientists do not know whether the reticulated humming frog and the tarantula both benefit or whether living with the tarantula is beneficial only to the frog. The frog lives in the tarantula burrow, where it is safe from drying out during the day and where frog-eating predators will not go. However, scientists have seen fly larvae on young tarantula spiderlings. The scientists speculated that this frog may help the tarantulas by eating flies that enter the burrow before they can lay eggs.

Other frogs and tarantulas that live far from South America also live together like this. For example, there are frogs and tarantulas in Sri Lanka that live together this way. Scientists think this relationship evolved more than once.
