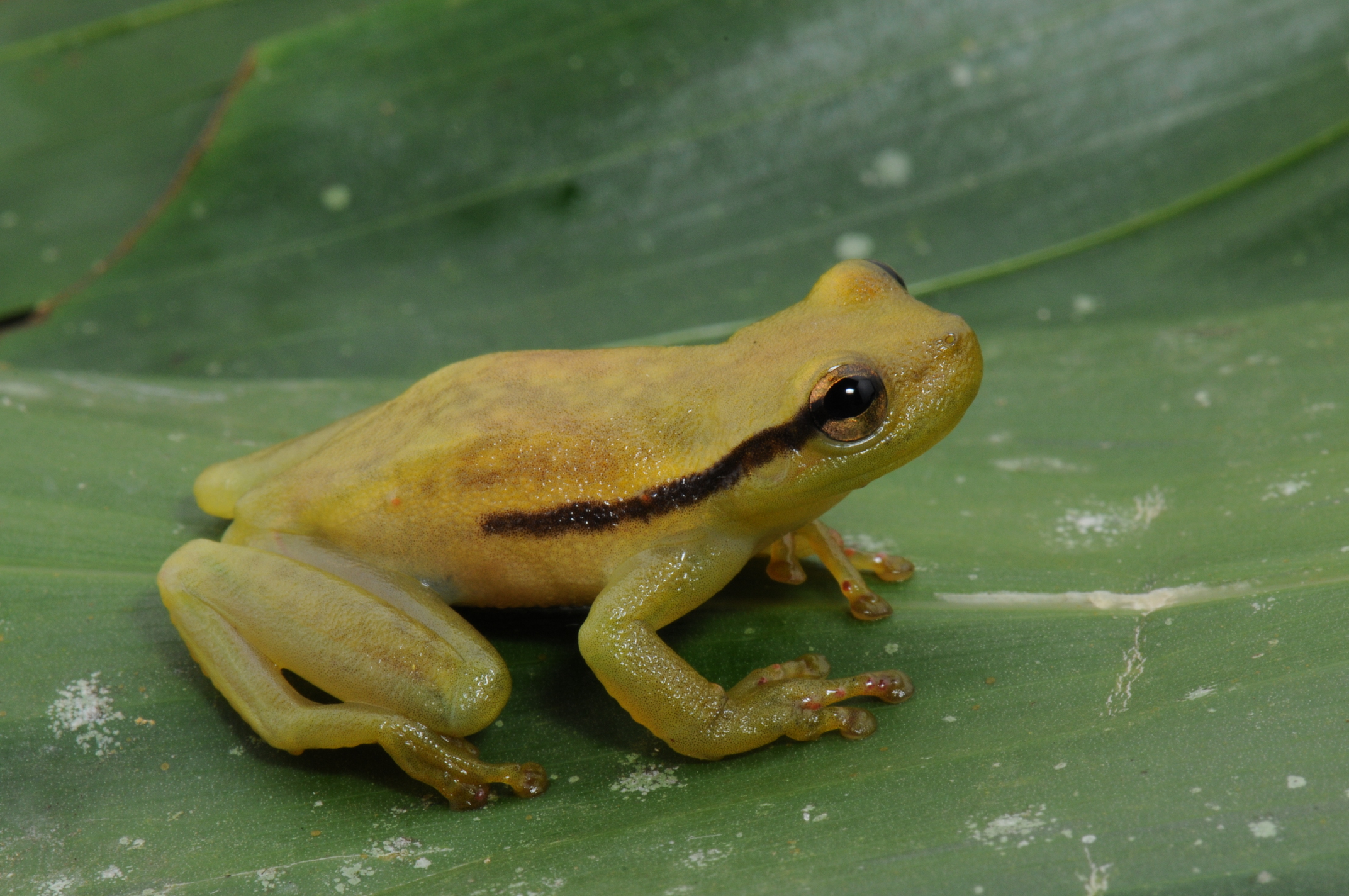

Conservation status
- Least Concern (IUCN 3.1)

Scientific classification
- Kingdom: Animalia
- Phylum: Chordata
- Class: Amphibia
- Order: Anura
- Family: Hylidae
- Genus: Phyllodytes
- Species: P. maculosus

Binomial name
- Phyllodytes maculosus (Cruz, Feio, and Cardoso, 2007)

Synonyms
- Phyllodytes maculosus Cruz, Feio, and Cardoso, 2007

= Phyllodytes maculosus =

Species of amphibian

Phyllodytes maculosus is a species of frogs in the family Hylidae endemic to Brazil's rainforests. It has been observed between 77 and 837 meters above sea level.

This frog is not in danger of extinction because of its relatively large current range. It was affected by the extensive deforestation that occurred over the past century but much of its habitat's conversion to farms and grazing space has already taken place, and the rate of habitat loss has slowed. While humans still harvest the trees, it is more about wood collection than changes in land use. Furthermore, some of the farms and grazing areas have been converted to silviculture, in which some frogs can live.

This frog lives in arboreal bromeliad plants high in the rainforest canopy. The female frog lays small clutches of eggs on the leaves of the bromeliad plants. When the eggs hatch, the tadpoles fall into the water that collects in the axil, where they swim and develop.
