= Alhandra heart-tongued frog =

Conservation status
- Vulnerable (IUCN 3.1)

Scientific classification
- Kingdom: Animalia
- Phylum: Chordata
- Class: Amphibia
- Order: Anura
- Family: Hylidae
- Genus: Phyllodytes
- Species: P. brevirostris

Binomial name
- Phyllodytes brevirostris Peixoto & Cruz, 1988

Species of amphibian

The Alhandra heart-tongued frog (Phyllodytes brevirostris) is a species of frog in the family Hylidae endemic to Brazil. It has been observed as high as 100 meters above sea level.

== Habitat ==
This frog lives in forests and shrublands, where it has been found associated with bromeliad plants. Scientists believe the female frog may lay her eggs in water on the leaves of the plants, as other frogs in Phyllodytes do. They believe that the tadpoles may swim and develop in these pools of water but this has not yet been observed.

== Threats ==
This frog is classified as vulnerable to extinction because of habitat loss from urbanization, agriculture, logging, and livestock cultivation.
