= Alagoas heart-tongued frog =

Conservation status
- Least Concern (IUCN 3.1)

Scientific classification
- Kingdom: Animalia
- Phylum: Chordata
- Class: Amphibia
- Order: Anura
- Family: Hylidae
- Genus: Phyllodytes
- Species: P. acuminatus

Binomial name
- Phyllodytes acuminatus Bokermann, 1966

Species of amphibian

The Alagoas heart-tongued frog (Phyllodytes acuminatus) is a species of frog in the family Hylidae, the tree frogs and allies. It is endemic to Brazil, where it is known from coastal regions in Bahia, Alagoas, and Pernambuco. It has been observed as high as 550 meters above sea level.

== Appearance ==
This species can be differentiated from other members of genus Phyllodytes by the double row of papillae surrounding its mouth.

== Habitat ==
People have seen this frog in bromeliad plants near the edges of forests, and it is presumed to live in the forest canopy in deep forest. Scientists note that this frog can live in moderately disturbed habitats but not severely disturbed habitats. Scientists cite habitat fragmentation as the principal threat, specifically urbanization, agriculture, logging, and make places livestock cultivation.

== Life cycle ==
The female frog usually lays one egg at a time, each on the leaf of a bromeliad plant, near the stored water. The tadpole swims and develops in the bromeliad plant.
