= Phyllodytes amadoi =

Scientific classification
- Domain: Eukaryota
- Kingdom: Animalia
- Phylum: Chordata
- Class: Amphibia
- Order: Anura
- Family: Hylidae
- Genus: Phyllodytes
- Species: P. amadoi

Binomial name
- Phyllodytes amadoi Vörös, Dias, and Solé, 2017

Species of frog

Phyllodytes amadoi, commonly known as Amado's heart-tongued frog, is a frog in the family Hylidae, endemic to the Atlantic Forest of Brazil. Scientists know it exclusively from the type locality, which is in Bahia, but its range is likely to be much wider.

This frog is small for a species in Phyllodytes. The adult frog measures 15.6–23.0 mm in snout-vent length. The species was named after Jorge Amado, a Brazilian modernist writer who lived in the same area as the type locality and was a lifelong frog enthusiast.
