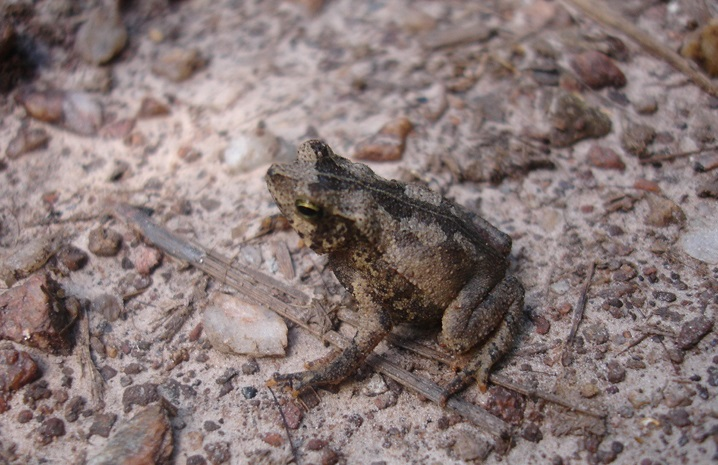

Conservation status
- Data Deficient (IUCN 3.1)

Scientific classification
- Kingdom: Animalia
- Phylum: Chordata
- Class: Amphibia
- Order: Anura
- Family: Bufonidae
- Genus: Rhinella
- Species: R. scitula

Binomial name
- Rhinella scitula (Caramaschi and Niemeyer, 2003)

Synonyms
- Bufo scitulus Caramaschi and Niemeyer, 2003

= Rhinella scitula =

Species of amphibian

Rhinella scitula is a species of toads in the family Bufonidae. It is found in the southwestern Mato Grosso do Sul, Brazil, and in the adjacent southeastern Paraguay (Amambay and Concepción Departments).

== Description ==
Males measure 33–46 mm (1.3–1.8 in) and females 46–51 mm (1.8–2.0 in) in snout–vent length. The species has a robust appearance. The snout is rounded with a small apical apophysis in dorsal view and sub-acuminate in lateral profile. The coloration is variable. The dorsum is generally light brown to dark brown. Light-colored individuals have no pattern or have a cream vertebral line. Darker specimens have a broadish, light brown vertebral stripe. There is a black, triangular inter-ocular spot facing backward, as well as an oblong dorsal blackish spot that connects to another black spot near the urostyle. The belly is light creamy, marbled with light gray.

== Habitat and conservation ==
Rhinella scitula is associated with seasonal forests and mountainous landscapes at elevations between 100–700 m (330–2,300 ft) above sea level. Breeding takes place in small pools in slow-flowing streams after rainfalls and is of explosive type. Males call mainly during twilight. The species is abundant in seasonal forest areas with rocky outcrops. As of 2004, no threats to this then recently described species had been identified.
