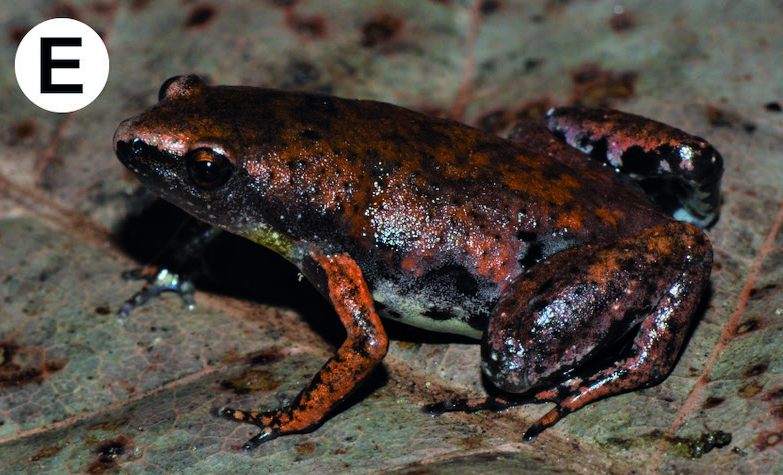
- Amapá, Brazil

Conservation status
- Least Concern (IUCN 3.1)

Scientific classification
- Kingdom: Animalia
- Phylum: Chordata
- Class: Amphibia
- Order: Anura
- Family: Microhylidae
- Genus: Chiasmocleis
- Species: C. shudikarensis

Binomial name
- Chiasmocleis shudikarensis Dunn, 1949

= Chiasmocleis shudikarensis =

Species of frog

Chiasmocleis shudikarensis is a species of frog in the family Microhylidae. It is found in Brazil, French Guiana, Guyana, Suriname, and possibly Peru. Its natural habitats are subtropical or tropical moist lowland forests and intermittent freshwater marshes. It is threatened by habitat loss.
