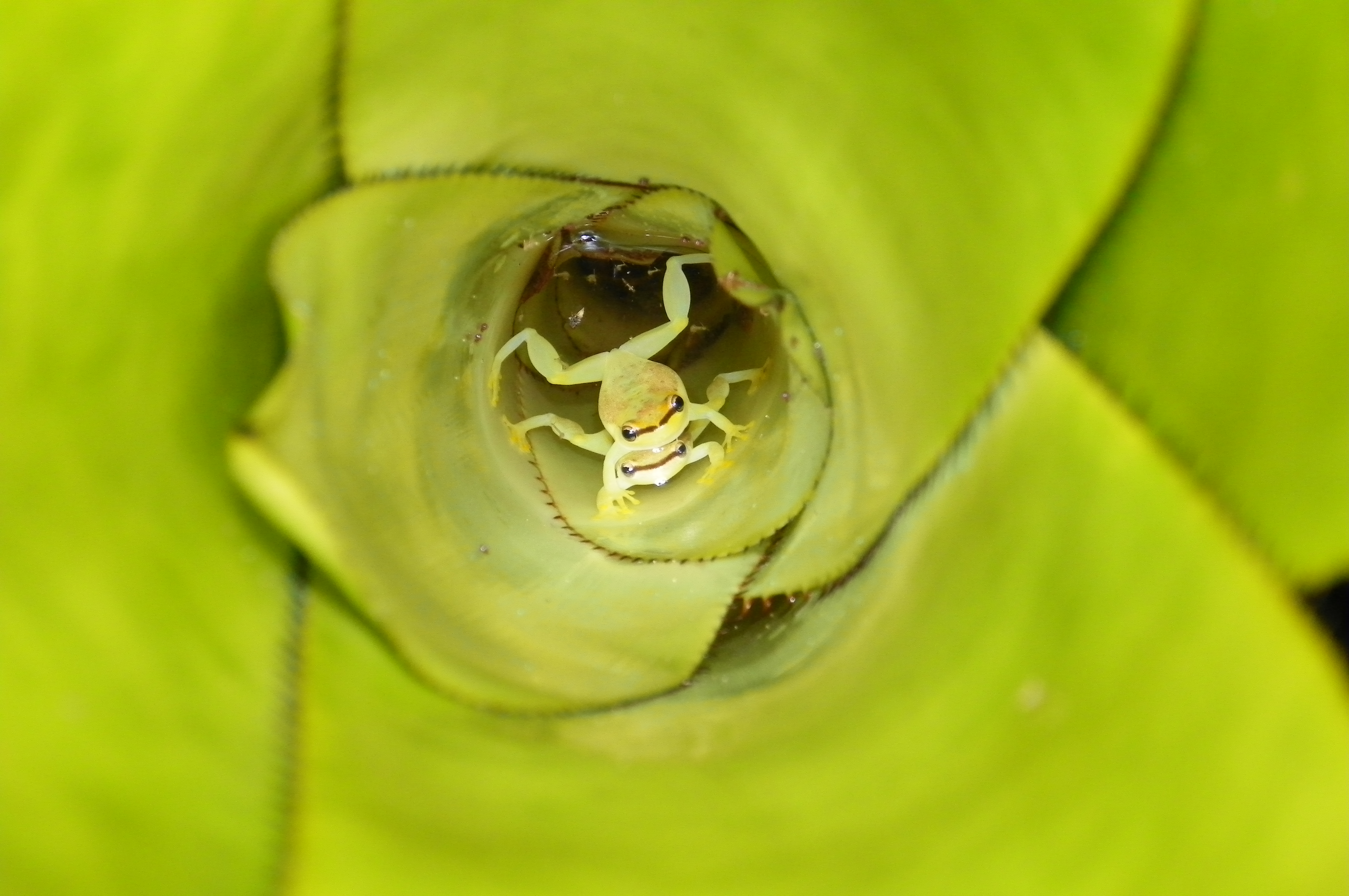

Conservation status
- Least Concern (IUCN 3.1)

Scientific classification
- Domain: Eukaryota
- Kingdom: Animalia
- Phylum: Chordata
- Class: Amphibia
- Order: Anura
- Family: Hylidae
- Genus: Phyllodytes
- Species: P. melanomystax

Binomial name
- Phyllodytes melanomystax (Caramaschi, da Silva & Britto-Pereira, 1992)

= Bahia heart-tongued frog =

Species of amphibian

The Bahia heart-tongued frog (Phyllodytes melanomystax) is a species of frog in the family Hylidae endemic to Brazil's rainforests. It has been observed as high as 800 meters above sea level.

This frog lives on epiphyte bromeliads, but only those that live high in the canopy, not on bromeliads that grow on the ground or on smaller host plants. The female frog lays eggs on the leaves, and tadpoles develop in the pools of water that collect near the axil of the plants.

Scientists say this frog is not in danger of extinction because it has such a large range. Although there has been significant deforestation to convert the lambs to farms and grazing, there is still significant forest as of 2023.
