= Syncope jimi =

Conservation status
- Data Deficient (IUCN 3.1)

Scientific classification
- Kingdom: Animalia
- Phylum: Chordata
- Class: Amphibia
- Order: Anura
- Family: Microhylidae
- Genus: Syncope
- Species: S. jimi

Binomial name
- Syncope jimi (Caramaschi & Cruz, 2001)

Synonyms
- Chiasmocleis jimi Caramaschi & Cruz, 2001

Species of frog

Syncope jimi is a species of frog in the family Microhylidae. It is endemic to Brazil and known from Humaitá, Amazonas, its type locality in Amazonas and from the Pará state. It is a common species within its range, found in leaf-litter of old-growth forests.
