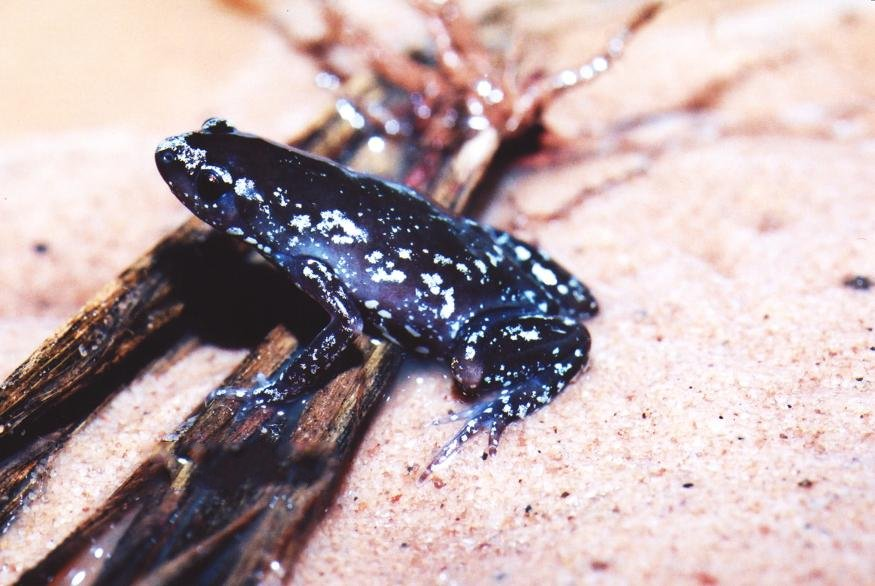

Conservation status
- Least Concern (IUCN 3.1)

Scientific classification
- Kingdom: Animalia
- Phylum: Chordata
- Class: Amphibia
- Order: Anura
- Family: Microhylidae
- Genus: Chiasmocleis
- Species: C. albopunctata

Binomial name
- Chiasmocleis albopunctata (Boettger, 1885)

= Chiasmocleis albopunctata =

Species of frog

Chiasmocleis albopunctata is a species of frog in the family Microhylidae. It is found in Bolivia, Brazil, and Paraguay. Its natural habitats are subtropical or tropical dry forests, dry savanna, moist savanna, subtropical or tropical moist shrubland, subtropical or tropical seasonally wet or flooded lowland grassland, intermittent freshwater lakes, intermittent freshwater marshes, arable land, pastureland, rural gardens, heavily degraded former forest, ponds, seasonally flooded agricultural land, and canals and ditches.
