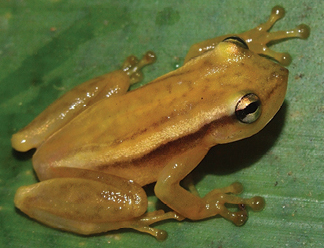

Conservation status
- Vulnerable (IUCN 3.1)

Scientific classification
- Kingdom: Animalia
- Phylum: Chordata
- Class: Amphibia
- Order: Anura
- Family: Hylidae
- Genus: Phyllodytes
- Species: P. wuchereri

Binomial name
- Phyllodytes wuchereri (Peters, 1873)

= Phyllodytes wuchereri =

Species of frog

Phyllodytes wuchereri is a species of frog in the family Hylidae endemic to Brazil in the Atlantic forest in the state of Bahia. This frog has been observed 400 meters above sea level.

The adult male frog measures 25.1–26.0 mm in snout-vent length and the adult female frog 26.2–27.1 mm. The skin of dorsum and backs of the legs is brown in color. There is a white stripe from each eye down to the end of the body. There are vomerine teeth in the frog's jaw. The adult male frog has a nuptial pad on each front foot.

Scientists say this frog is not in danger of dying out because it has such a large range. It lives in primary forest, secondary forest, and areas where humans have thinned out the natural trees to provide moderate shade for cacao farms. Scientists say that as long as cacao remains a primary crop in the area, the frog will have habitat.

The male frogs can be territorial. The frogs live on bromeliad plants. The female frog lays eggs in the bromeliads and the tadpoles swim and develop in the pools of water that collect near the axils. There is only one tadpole per pool but sometimes more than one pool per plant.

Scientists believe this frog could be in danger if human beings were to collect their bromeliad plants, but they do not believe anyone is harvesting the plants as of 2023.
