= Blabicentrus capixaba =

Scientific classification
- Domain: Eukaryota
- Kingdom: Animalia
- Phylum: Arthropoda
- Class: Insecta
- Order: Coleoptera
- Suborder: Polyphaga
- Infraorder: Cucujiformia
- Family: Cerambycidae
- Genus: Blabicentrus
- Species: B. capixaba

Binomial name
- Blabicentrus capixaba (Martins & Galileo, 1998)

Synonyms
- Ceiupaba capixaba Martins & Galileo, 1998

Species of beetle

Blabicentrus capixaba is a species of beetle in the family Cerambycidae. It was described by Martins and Galileo in 1998. It is known from Brazil.
