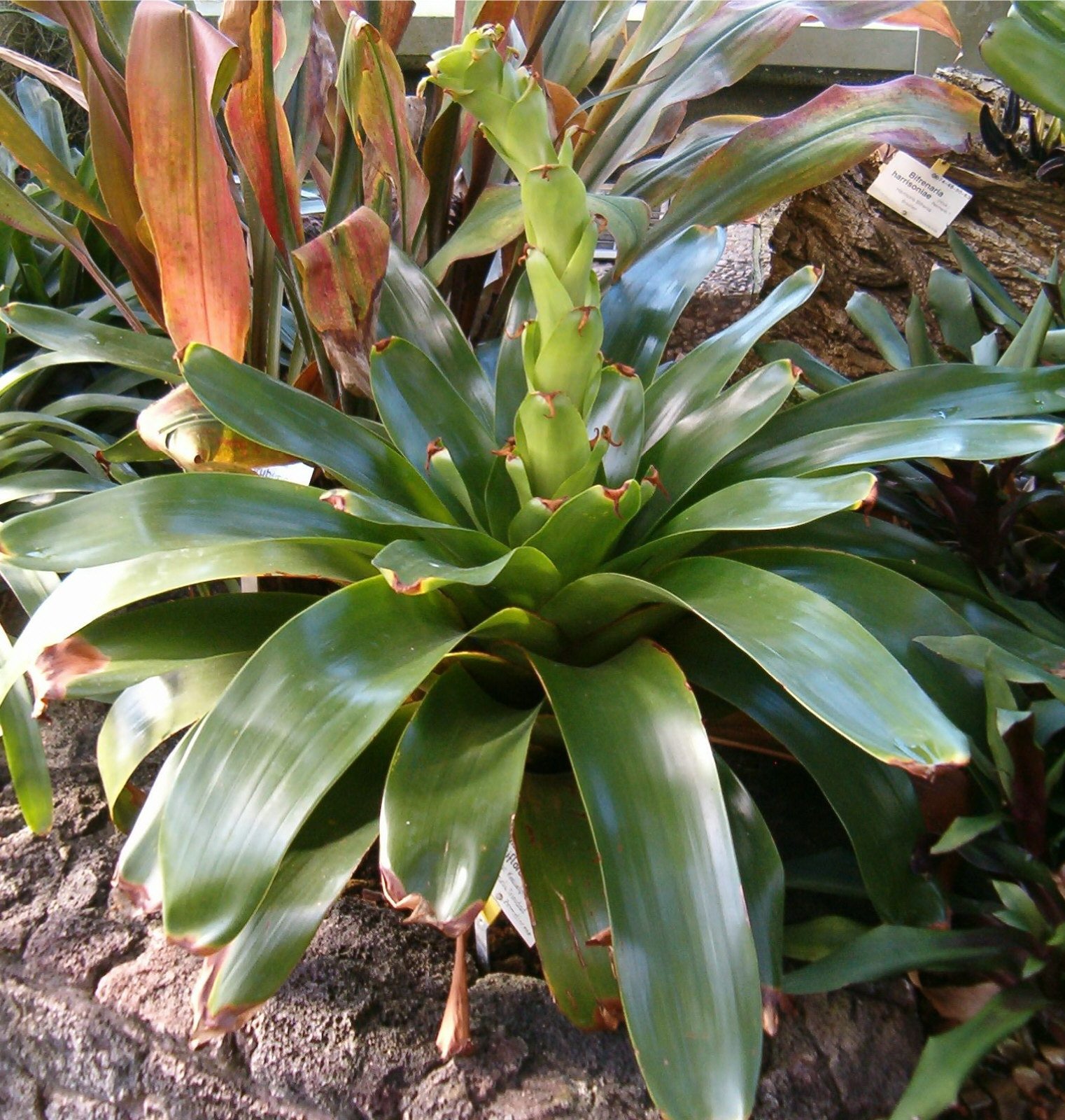
- Glomeropitcairnia erectiflora

Scientific classification
- Kingdom: Plantae
- Clade: Embryophytes
- Clade: Tracheophytes
- Clade: Spermatophytes
- Clade: Angiosperms
- Clade: Monocots
- Clade: Commelinids
- Order: Poales
- Family: Bromeliaceae
- Subfamily: Tillandsioideae
- Genus: Glomeropitcairnia
- Species: G. erectiflora

Binomial name
- Glomeropitcairnia erectiflora Mez

= Glomeropitcairnia erectiflora =

Species of flowering plant

Glomeropitcairnia erectiflora is a plant species in the genus Glomeropitcairnia in the family Bromeliaceae. This epiphytic tank bromeliad species is native to Venezuela and to the island of Trinidad, occurring in montane and elfin cloud forests. It is used by tree frog Phytotriades auratus as a refuge and nesting site. The inflorescence can rise 2.7 m (8 ft 10 in) above the rosette of waxy, broad linear leaves.
