= Ulisses Caramaschi =

Brazilian herpetologist

- Education: São Paulo State University
- Occupation: Herpetologist

Ulisses Caramaschi is a Brazilian herpetologist specializing in neotropical frogs. He works at the National Museum of Brazil and is a professor at its Department of Vertebrates.

== Education ==
Caramaschi possesses a bachelor's degree from the Botucatu campus of São Paulo State University and a master's from the University of Campinas in ecology, and a doctorate in biological science from São Paulo State University.

== Taxa described ==
- Bufo scitulus
- Chiasmocleis alagoanus
- Chiasmocleis atlantica
- Chiasmocleis capixaba
- Chiasmocleis carvalhoi
- Chiasmocleis cordeiroi
- Chiasmocleis crucis
- Chiasmocleis jimi
- Chiasmocleis mehelyi
- Crossodactylus bokermanni
- Crossodactylus dantei
- Crossodactylus lutzorum
- Elachistocleis piauiensis
- Gastrotheca pulchra
- Hyla araguaya
- Hyla atlantica
- Hyla buriti
- Hyla cachimbo
- Hyla cerradensis
- Hyla elianeae
- Hyla ericae
- Hyla ibitipoca
- Hyla izecksohni
- Hyla jimi
- Hyla leucocheila
- Hyla phaeopleura
- Hyla pseudomeridiana
- Hyla ravida
- Hyla rhea
- Hyla soaresi
- Hyla stenocephala
- Ischnocnema izecksohni
- Liotyphlops trefauti
- Melanophryniscus simplex
- Melanophryniscus spectabilis
- Odontophrynus moratoi
- Odontophrynus salvatori
- Phyllodytes edelmoi
- Phyllodytes gyrinaethes
- Phyllodytes melanomystax
- Phyllodytes punctatus
- Pseudis tocantins
- Scinax carnevallii
- Scinax luizotavioi
- Thoropa megatympanum
- Xenohyla eugenioi

=== Taxa named in honor of ===
- Crossodactylus caramaschii Bastos and Pombal, 1995
- Bokermannohyla caramaschii Napoli, 2005
- Sphaenorhynchus caramaschii Toledo, Garcia, Lingnau & Haddad, 2007
