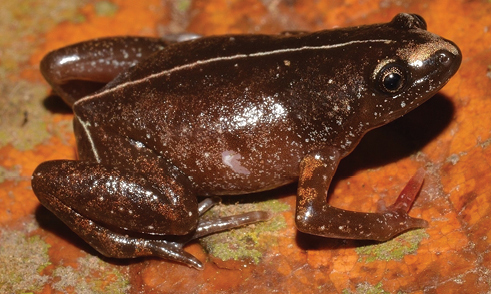
- Espírito Santo, Brazil

Conservation status
- Least Concern (IUCN 3.1)

Scientific classification
- Kingdom: Animalia
- Phylum: Chordata
- Class: Amphibia
- Order: Anura
- Family: Microhylidae
- Genus: Chiasmocleis
- Species: C. capixaba

Binomial name
- Chiasmocleis capixaba (Cruz, Caramaschi & Izecksohn, 1997)

= Chiasmocleis capixaba =

Species of frog

Chiasmocleis capixaba is a species of frog in the family Microhylidae. It is endemic to Brazil. Its natural habitats are subtropical or tropical moist lowland forests and intermittent freshwater marshes. It is threatened by habitat loss.
