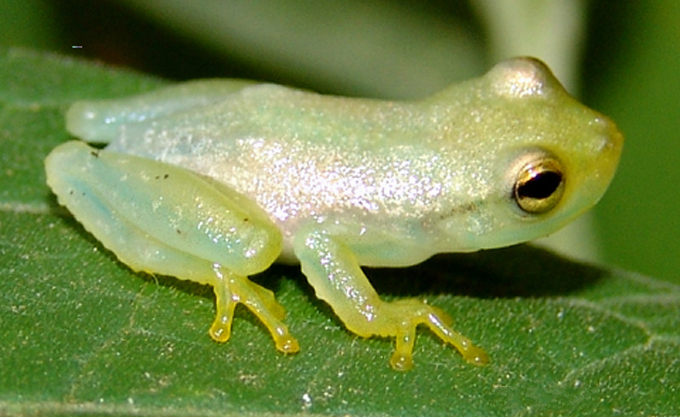

Conservation status
- Least Concern (IUCN 3.1)

Scientific classification
- Domain: Eukaryota
- Kingdom: Animalia
- Phylum: Chordata
- Class: Amphibia
- Order: Anura
- Family: Hylidae
- Genus: Phyllodytes
- Species: P. luteolus

Binomial name
- Phyllodytes luteolus (Wied-Neuwied, 1824)

= Yellow heart-tongued frog =

Species of amphibian

The yellow heart-tongued frog (Phyllodytes luteolus) is a species of frog in the family Hylidae endemic to Brazil. It has been observed as high as 650 meters above sea level.

This frog lives in the Atlantic forest and Caaatingas habitats, on bromeliad plants. The female frog lays a few eggs per clutch, making use of more than one bromeliad per season.

This frog is not in danger of extinction, though some local populations are threatened by habitat loss and the collection of the bromeliad plants upon which they depend. However, unlike some other frogs in Phyllodytes, this frog can live in degraded habitats, such as secondary forests growing back after being cut down.
