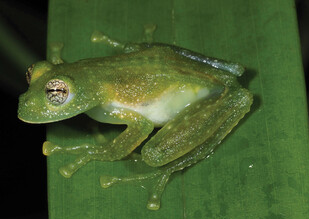
- Holotype

Scientific classification
- Kingdom: Animalia
- Phylum: Chordata
- Class: Amphibia
- Order: Anura
- Family: Centrolenidae
- Genus: Centrolene
- Species: C. zarza

Binomial name
- Centrolene zarza Székely, Córdova-Díaz, Hualpa-Vega, Hualpa-Vega, and Székely, 2023

= Centrolene zarza =

Species of amphibian

Centrolene zarza, the Zarza glassfrog, is a species of frog in the family Centrolenidae. It is green, with yellowish-green spots. The tadpoles are pinkish. The species is endemic to Ecuador.

Centrolene zarza was described in 2023, and named after the wildlife refuge where it was discovered.

== Taxonomy ==
Centrolene zarza was described in 2023, by Paul Székely, María Córdova-Díaz, Daniel Hualpa-Vega, Santiago Hualpa-Vega, and Diana Székely. It was first described from a locality in the El Zarza Wildlife Refuge, Cordillera del Cóndor. The holotype is an adult female, collected in 2020.

A 2024 analysis found that Centrolene zarza is a sister species to a clade formed by Centrolene camposi, Centrolene condor, and Centrolene kutuku.

== Distribution ==
Centrolene zarza is endemic to Ecuador. It has been found in four localities in southern Ecuador, and has an extent of occurrence of 3,026 square kilometres (1,168 sq mi).

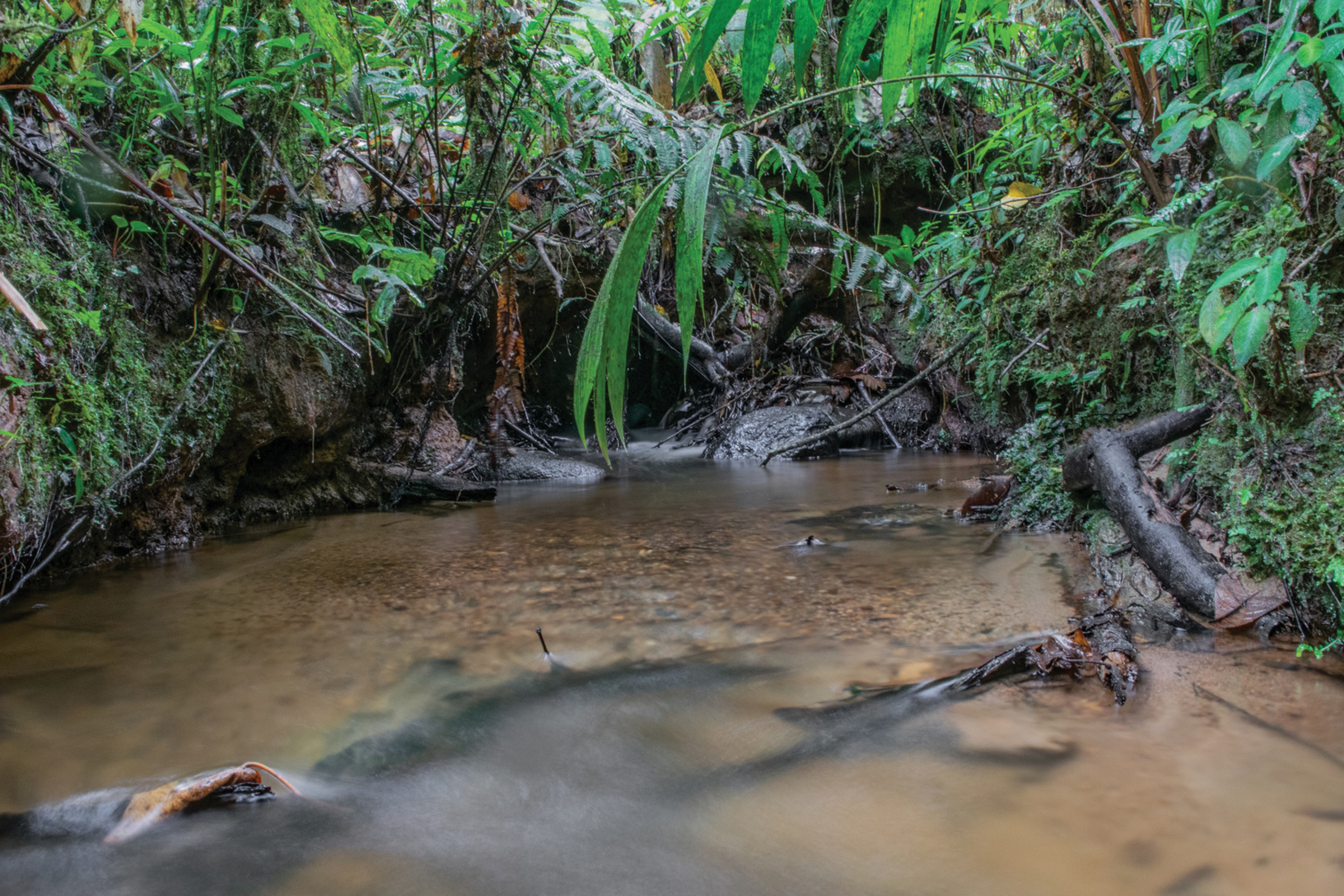
Habitat in El Zarza Wildlife Refuge

The species is present on the eastern slopes of the Cordillera Occidental, the Cordillera del Cóndor and the Cordillera de Cutucú. The species has been found at elevations of 1,430–1,905 metres (4,692–6,250 ft). Individuals have been found underneath and on top of leaves. Syntopic species include Espadarana audax, Nymphargus posadae, Chimerella mariaelenae, and Rulyrana mcdiarmidi.

== Description ==
The dorsal surfaces are light or dark green, with yellowish-green spots. The head back, and limbs have warts. The upper arms and thighs have a large enamelled spot. The fingers and toes are yellowish. The bones are green. The pericardium has a layer of iridophores. The nuptial pads are unpigmented.

Adult males are 23.2–26.2 millimetres (0.91–1.03 in) long in snout-vent length, and adult females are 25.5–30 millimetres (1.00–1.18 in) long.

The snout is rounded, sloping, and has enamelled warts at the tip. The humeral spine is short. The vomer has teeth. The iris is white or yellowish-white, with black lines.

Centrolene zarza superficially resembles Centrolene condor, Centrolene pipilata, Centrolene solitaria, Centrolene altitudinalis, and Centrolene daidalea.

=== Tadpoles ===
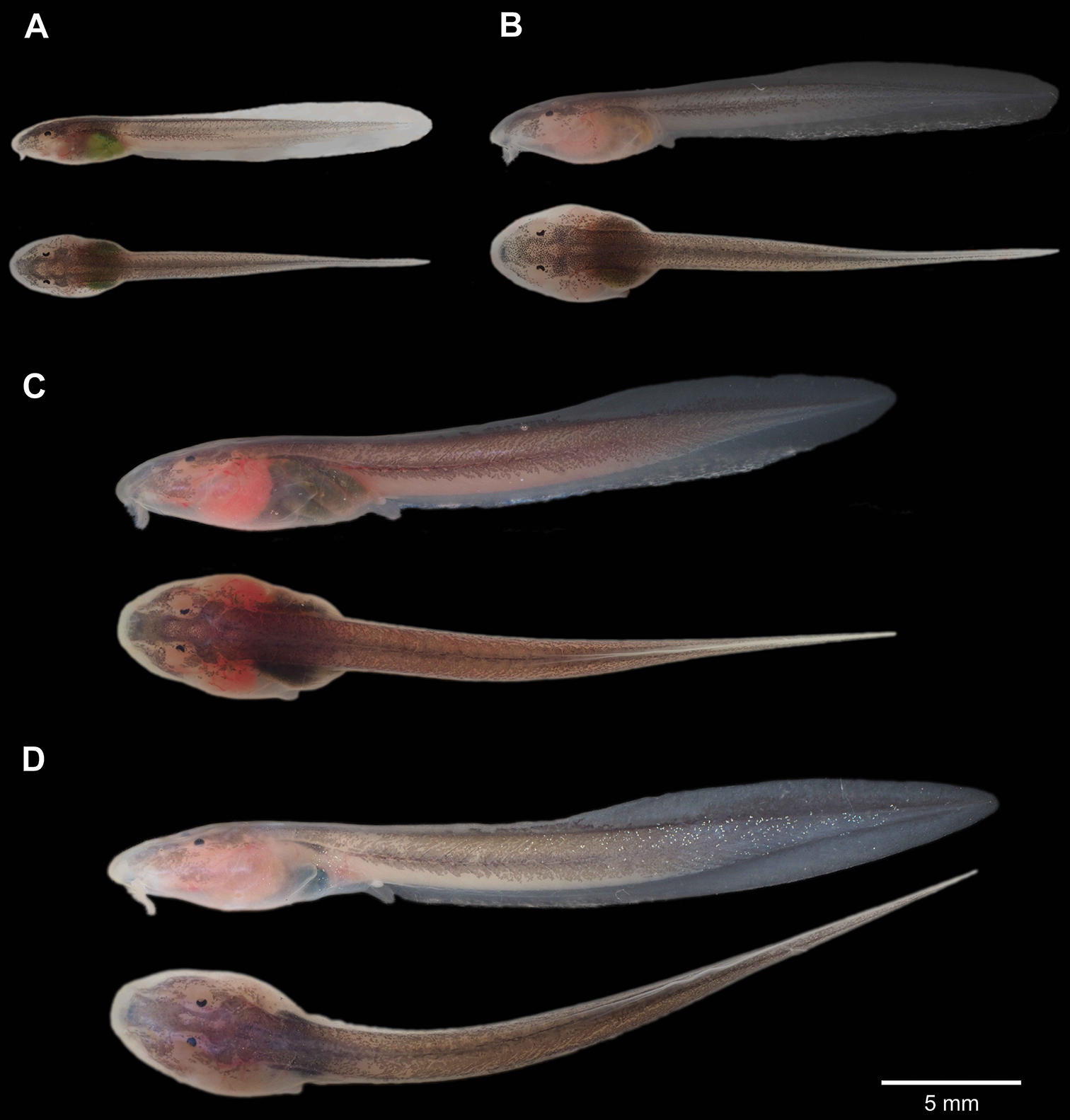
Hatchlings and tadpoles. A = Gosner stage 24 B = Gosner stage 25 C = Gosner stage 26 D = Gosner stage 31

The tadpoles are pinkish and elongated. At Gosner stage 31, they are 26.9–34.7 millimetres (1.06–1.37 in) long. The tail is around 2.4 times the length of the body. The eyes are C-shaped, and located on top of the head. The tadpoles have a single short spiracle.

== Life history ==
The male advertisement call consists of a single high pitched note. The eggs are laid in clutches or thirteen to thirty-three, and attached to the upper sides of leaves.

== Conservation ==
A 2024 paper suggested that Centrolene zarza should be listed as Endangered. The species has been found in Sangay National Park and El Zarza Wildlife Refuge. It may be threatened by mining and habitat loss.

== Nomenclature ==
The specific epithet is a noun in apposition, and refers to the El Zarza Wildlife Refuge, the species' type locality. In English, Centrolene zarza is commonly known as the "Zarza glassfrog". In Spanish, it is known as Rana Cristal de Zarza.
