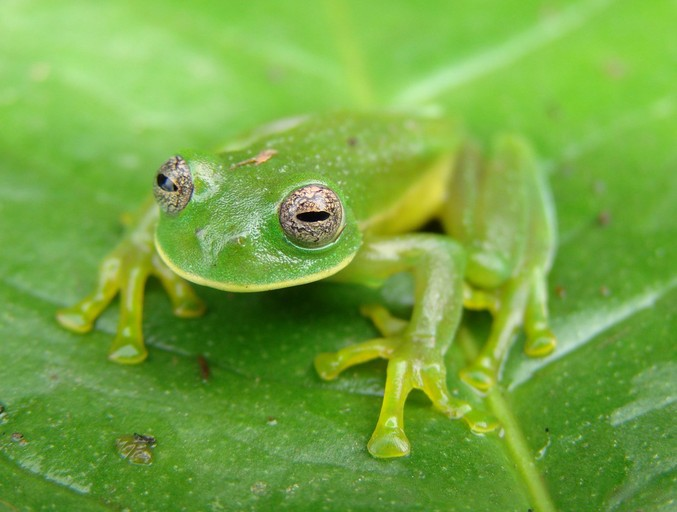
- Centrolene buckleyi

Scientific classification
- Kingdom: Animalia
- Phylum: Chordata
- Class: Amphibia
- Order: Anura
- Family: Centrolenidae
- Subfamily: Centroleninae; Taylor, 1951

Type genus
- Centrolene Jiménez de la Espada, 1872

Diversity
- 9 genera (see text)

= Centroleninae =

Subfamily of amphibians

Centroleninae is one of two subfamilies of the family Centrolenidae. It has nine genera distributed in Central America from Honduras south and east to northern and central South America. As of mid 2015, it contains 117 species.

== Taxonomy ==
Centroleninae are defined based on molecular and morphological characteristics, none of which are obvious to a naked eye. However, in several species a fighting behaviour that might be synapomorphy has been observed: males dangle by their feet and grapple venter-to-venter; amplexus-like or wrestling on leaves fighting of Hyalinobatrachinae is hypothesized to be primitive behaviour. Their sister taxon is ambiguous, it is either genus Ikakogi or subfamily Hyalinobatrachinae.

== Genera ==
There are nine genera:

- Centrolene Jiménez de la Espada, 1872 (29 sp.)
- Chimerella Guayasamin, Castroviejo-Fisher, Trueb, Ayarzagüena, Rada, and Vilà, 2009 (2 sp.)
- Cochranella Taylor, 1951 (9 sp.)
- Espadarana Guayasamin, Castroviejo-Fisher, Trueb, Ayarzagüena, Rada, and Vilà, 2009 (5 sp.)
- Nymphargus Cisneros-Heredia and McDiarmid, 2007 (38 sp.)
- Rulyrana Guayasamin, Castroviejo-Fisher, Trueb, Ayarzagüena, Rada, and Vilà, 2009 (6 sp.)
- Sachatamia Guayasamin, Castroviejo-Fisher, Trueb, Ayarzagüena, Rada, and Vilà, 2009 (5 sp.)
- Teratohyla Taylor, 1951 (5 sp.)
- Vitreorana Guayasamin, Castroviejo-Fisher, Trueb, Ayarzagüena, Rada, and Vilà, 2009 (10 sp.)

Several species have uncertain generic placement and are placed in Centroleninae Incertae Sedis, awaiting for more information:

- "Centrolene" acanthidiocephalum (Ruiz-Carranza and Lynch, 1989)
- "Centrolene" azulae (Flores and McDiarmid, 1989)
- "Centrolene" guanacarum Ruiz-Carranza and Lynch, 1995
- "Centrolene" medemi (Cochran and Goin, 1970)
- "Centrolene" petrophilum Ruiz-Carranza and Lynch, 1991
- "Centrolene" quindianum Ruiz-Carranza and Lynch, 1995
- "Centrolene" robledoi Ruiz-Carranza and Lynch, 1995
- "Cochranella" duidaeana (Ayarzagüena, 1992)
- "Cochranella" euhystrix (Cadle and McDiarmid, 1990)
- "Cochranella" geijskesi (Goin, 1966)
- "Cochranella" megista (Rivero, 1985)
- "Cochranella" ramirezi Ruiz-Carranza and Lynch, 1991
- "Cochranella" riveroi (Ayarzagüena, 1992)
- "Cochranella" xanthocheridia Ruiz-Carranza and Lynch, 1995

The AmphibiaWeb includes Ikakogi Guayasamin, Castroviejo-Fisher, Trueb, Ayarzagüena, Rada, and Vilà, 2009 in this subfamily, whereas it is not included in any subfamily in the Amphibian Species of the World.
