= Centrolene marcoreyesi =

Scientific classification
- Kingdom: Animalia
- Phylum: Chordata
- Class: Amphibia
- Order: Anura
- Family: Centrolenidae
- Genus: Centrolene
- Species: C. marcoreyesi

Binomial name
- Centrolene marcoreyesi Franco-Mena, Székely, Culebras, Batallas-Revelo, Reyes-Puig, and Guayasamin, 2024

Species of amphibian

Centrolene marcoreyesi, commonly known as Marco Reyes' glassfrog, is a species of frog in the family Centrolenidae. It is green, with whitish spots and low warts. The species is endemic to Ecuador.

Centrolene marcoreyesi was described in 2024, and is named after the herpetologist Marco Miguel Reyes-Puig.

== Taxonomy ==
Centrolene marcoreyesi was described in 2024, by Daniela Franco-Mena, Ignacio J. De la Riva, Mateo A. Vega-Yánez, Paul Székely, Luis Amador-Oyola, Diego Batallas, Juan Pablo Reyes-Puig, Diego F. Cisneros-Heredia, Khristian Venegas-Valencia, Sandra P. Galeano, Jaime Culebras, Juan Manuel Guayasamin.

Centrolene marcoreyesi was previously confused with Centrolene buckleyi. C. marcoreyesi may be a sister species to Centrolene sabini.

== Distribution ==
Centrolene marcoreyesi is endemic to Ecuador. It is found in the eastern slopes of the Andes, in Zamora-Chinchipe Province, at elevations of 1,840–2,190 metres (6,040–7,190 ft). Its extent of occurrence is less than 100 square kilometres (39 sq mi).

Centrolene marcoreyesi is sympatric with Gastrotheca testudinea, Nymphargus cariticommatus, Nymphargus posadae, Nymphargus cochranae, and Hyalinobatrachium.

== Description ==
The body and limbs are green with whitish spots. The dorsal skin has low warts. The back third of the underside is translucent. The fingers and toes are yellowish-green. The bones are green. The males are 24.5–27 millimetres (0.96–1.06 in) long in snout-vent length.

The snout is rounded and sloping. The lore is slightly concave. The upper lip is yellowish-white. The iris is lavender-white, with thin brown lines.

Adult males have a small, arched humeral spine. The legs are slender.

Centrolene marcoreyesi is similar to Centrolene buckleyi, Centrolene venezuelensis, and Centrolene elisae.

== Life history ==
Centrolene marcoreyesi has been found on leaves and ferns at night. Males have been found in primary and secondary forests, and near pastures.

The call consists of a single pulsed note.

== Conservation ==
The describing authors proposed a provisional conservation status of Endangered. The species is present in protected areas, including Podocarpus National Park. It is threatened by habitat degradation, caused by cattle farming, invasive species (including rainbow trout), and illegal mining.

== Nomenclature ==
The specific epithet marcoreyesi is a noun in the genitive case. It recognises the original collector, herpetologist Marco Miguel Reyes-Puig. Reyes-Puig was the brother of one of the describing authors.

In English, Centrolene marcoreyesi is commonly known as "Marco Reyes' Glassfrog". Its common name in Spanish is "Rana Cristal de Marco Reyes".
