= Centrolene sabini =

Conservation status
- Vulnerable (IUCN 3.1)

Scientific classification
- Kingdom: Animalia
- Phylum: Chordata
- Class: Amphibia
- Order: Anura
- Family: Centrolenidae
- Genus: Centrolene
- Species: C. sabini

Binomial name
- Centrolene sabini Catenazzi, Von May, Lehr, Gagliardi-Urrutia, and Guayasamin, 2012

Species of amphibian

Centrolene sabini, commonly known as Sabin's glassfrog, is a species of frog in the family Centrolenidae. It is green with yellowish spots, and is endemic to Peru. The species is listed as Vulnerable by the IUCN.

Centrolene sabini was described in 2012, and was the 7000th species added to AmphibiaWeb.

== Taxonomy and discovery ==
Centrolene sabini was first collected in January 1999. The holotype is a male, and was collected in 2009. The species was described in 2012, by Alessandro Catenazzi, Rudolf von May, Edgar Lehr, Giussepe Gagliardi-Urrutia, and Juan Manuel Guayasamin. Centrolene sabini was the 7000th amphibian species to be discovered and listed on AmphibiaWeb. A song was written to celebrate the milestone.

Centrolene sabini is closely related to Centrolene lynchi and Centrolene muelleri.

== Distribution ==
Centrolene sabini is endemic to Peru. It is found in two streams in Manu National Park, at elevations of 2,750–2,800 metres (9,020–9,190 ft). Its estimated extent of occurrence is 10 square kilometres (3.9 sq mi).

When Centrolene sabini was discovered, it was the southernmost occurrence of any Centrolene species. It is sympatric with Bryophryne nubilosus, Gastrotheca antoniiochoai, Gastrotheca nebulanastes, Noblella pygmaea, Noblella usurpator, Oreobates lehri, Pristimantis pharangobates, and Telmatobius.

== Description ==
Centrolene sabini is green with yellowish-green spots, and a yellowish white labial stripe. The bones are green. In males, the snout-vent length is 29.6–31.2 millimetres (1.17–1.23 in). The males have nuptial pads and humeral spines.

The vomer lacks teeth. The nostrils are protruding. The iris is cream or silver-bronze, with black lines.

Centrolene sabini is morphologically similar to Centrolene lemniscata and Centrolene buckleyi.

== Reproduction ==
The male advertisement call is relatively long, consisting of eight to fourteen notes. Males call from foliage over water. Mating occurs on leaves. Females lay clusters of thirty-five to forty-five eggs on leaves above streams, and the tadpoles fall into the water after hatching.

== Conservation ==
In 2017, the IUCN assessed Centrolene sabini as Vulnerable. It is threatened by potential landslides in its habitat.

The species is not known to be affected by chytrid fungus.

== Nomenclature ==
Centrolene sabini is named for Andrew Sabin, recognising his support of herpetology. In English, the species is commonly known as "Sabin's glassfrog". In Spanish, it is known as Rana de Cristal de Sabin.
