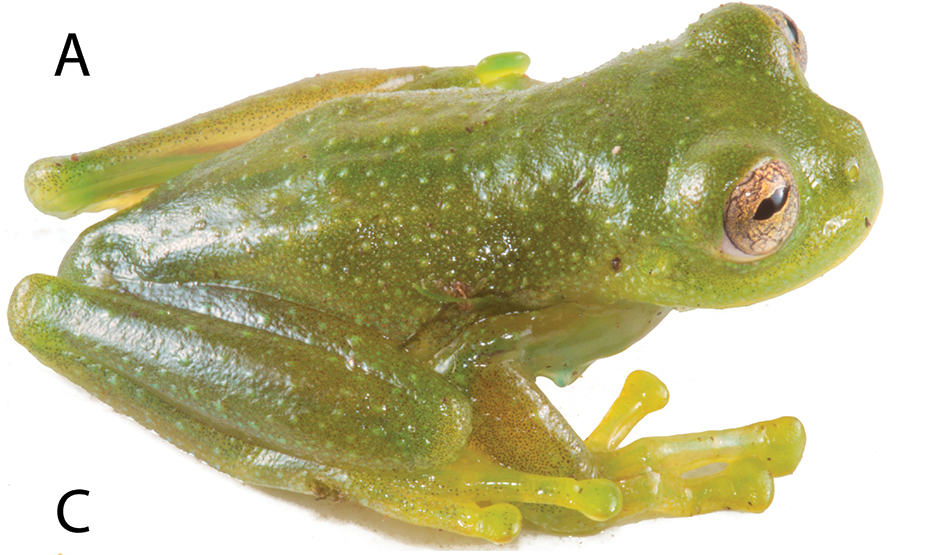

Scientific classification
- Kingdom: Animalia
- Phylum: Chordata
- Class: Amphibia
- Order: Anura
- Family: Centrolenidae
- Genus: Centrolene
- Species: C. kutuku

Binomial name
- Centrolene kutuku Ron, García, Brito-Zapata, Reyes- Puig, Figueroa-Coronel, and Cisneros-Heredia, 2024

= Centrolene kutuku =

Species of amphibian

Centrolene kutuku, the Kutukú Glassfrog, is a species of frog in the family Centrolenidae. It is green with light spots and has green bones. The species is endemic to Ecuador.

Centrolene kutuku was described in 2024 and is named after the Cordillera de Cutucú.

== Taxonomy ==
Centrolene kutuku was described in 2024, by Santiago R. Ron, Dominike García, David Brito-Zapata, Carolina Reyes-Puig, Elías Figueroa-Coronel, and Diego F. Cisneros-Heredia.

The type locality is in evergreen forest on the Cordillera de Cutucú, Santiago de Méndez Canton, at an elevation of 2,255–2,264 metres (7,398–7,428 ft).

Centrolene kutuku is a sister species to Centrolene camposi. These species form a clade with Centrolene condor.

== Distribution ==
Centrolene kutuku is endemic to Ecuador.

== Description ==
Described males had snout-vent lengths of 21.5 millimetres (0.85 in) and 21.9 millimetres (0.86 in). The head, body, and hands have numerous tubercules. The back is bright green, with light green spots. The underside is grainy. A short humeral spine is present in adult males. The back legs are thin. The bones are green.

The snout is rounded and sloping. The vomer lacks teeth but has a dentigerous process. The iris is cream, with grey lines.

The species is similar to Centrolene camposi, Centrolene ericsmithi, Centrolene heloderma, and Centrolene zarza.

== Nomenclature ==
The specific epithet "kutuku" is derived from the Shuar language, and refers to the Cordillera de Cutucú, where specimens were first collected.

In English, Centrolene kutuku is commonly known as the "Kutukú Glassfrog". In Spanish, it is known as Rana de Cristal de Kutukú.
