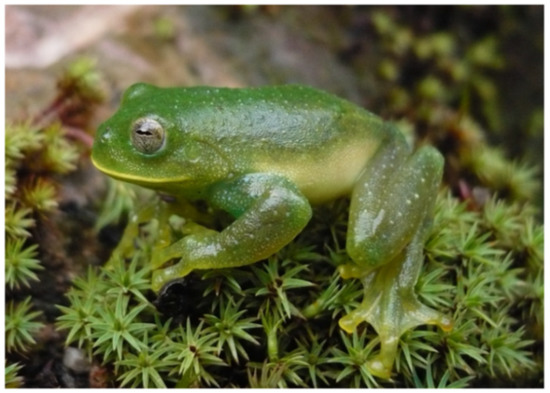

Conservation status
- Endangered (IUCN 3.1)
- CITES Appendix II

Scientific classification
- Kingdom: Animalia
- Phylum: Chordata
- Class: Amphibia
- Order: Anura
- Family: Centrolenidae
- Genus: Centrolene
- Species: C. condor

Binomial name
- Centrolene condor Cisneros-Heredia and Morales-Mite

= Centrolene condor =

Species of amphibian

Centrolene condor is a species of frog in the family Centrolenidae. It is 23.2–27.6 millimetres (0.91–1.09 in) long, and the back is bluish-green, with bluish-black, brown, and yellowish-white flecks. The species is native to Ecuador.

Centrolene condor was described in 2008, and is listed as Endangered by the IUCN.

== Taxonomy ==
Centrolene condor was described by Diego F. Cisneros-Heredia and Manuel Antonio Morales-Mite in 2008.

The type locality is on the western slope of the Cordillera del Cóndor, in Ecuador's Zamora-Chinchipe Province.

== Distribution ==
Centrolene condor is native to the southern Ecuadorian region of the Cordillera del Cóndor. It is present in Morona-Santiago Province and Zamora-Chinchipe Province. The species is known only from Ecuador, but may also occur in Peru. Its extent of occurrence is around 1,091 square kilometres (421 sq mi).

The species is found in dwarf forest, at elevations of 882–2,920 metres (2,894–9,580 ft).

Centrolene condor was the first glass frog discovered in the Cordillera del Cóndor.

== Description ==
The body is slender, and indistinct from the head. The snout–vent length of adult males is 23.2–27.6 millimetres (0.91–1.09 in). The back is bluish-green, with warts and has bluish-black, brown, and yellowish-white flecks. The arms and legs are light green, with yellowish-white and dark flecks. A small humeral spine is present in males. The legs are slender. The underside is grainy. There are a few warts below the cloacal opening. The bones are green.

The head is around 9.5 millimetres (0.37 in) wide, and around 9.1 millimetres (0.36 in) long. The vomer has horizontal processes, and the choanae are small and oval-shaped. The tongue is elongated, and shaped like a spatula. The snout is pointed, and sloped downwards. The nostrils are slightly elevated. The iris is light grey, with dark lines.

Centrolene condor is most similar to Centrolene altitudinalis, Centrolene buckleyi, Centrolene hesperia, Centrolene lemniscata, and Centrolene venezuelensis.

== Life history ==
Centrolene condor is nocturnal. Males have been heard calling from leaves above water. The male advertisement call lasts 650–700 milliseconds, and consists of two notes. Breeding is assumed to take place in streams. The tadpoles are bright red.

== Conservation ==
In 2020, the IUCN assessed Centrolene condor as Endangered. It was previously listed as Data Deficient. The species is listed in Appendix II of CITES. No quotas or suspenions are in place.

Centrolene condor is threatened by mining and associated pollution of water. The population is expected to decline by over 50% by 2031. The species has been found near, but not within, protected areas.

== Nomenclature ==
Centrolene condor is named after the Cordillera del Cóndor mountains.

In English, Centrolene condor is commonly known as the El Cóndor Glass Frog or Condor Glass Frog. In Spanish, it is known as Rana de Cristal del Cóndor.
