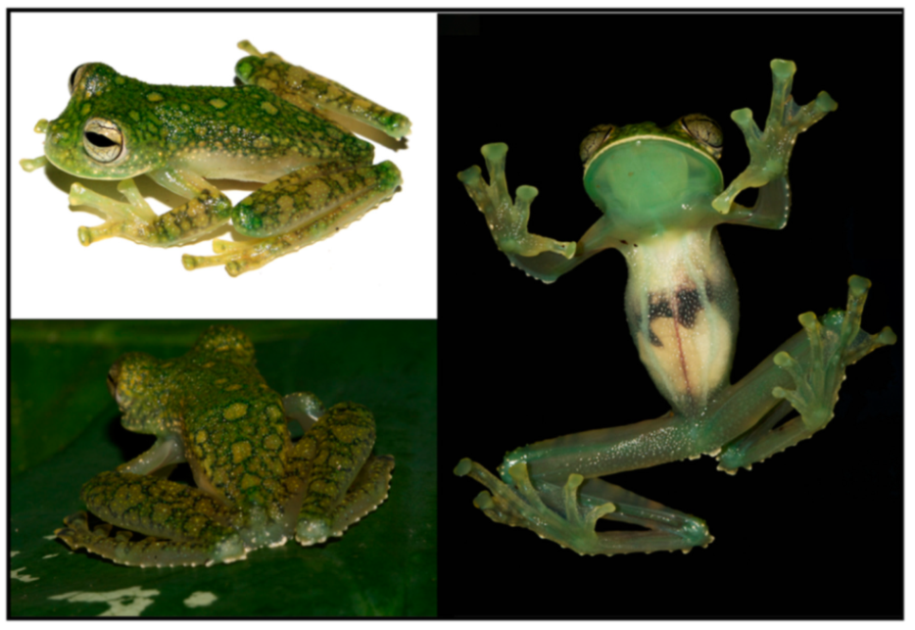

Conservation status
- Endangered (IUCN 3.1)
- CITES Appendix II

Scientific classification
- Kingdom: Animalia
- Phylum: Chordata
- Class: Amphibia
- Order: Anura
- Family: Centrolenidae
- Genus: Centrolene
- Species: C. charapita

Binomial name
- Centrolene charapita Twomey, Delia & Castroviejo-Fisher, 2014

= Centrolene charapita =

Species of amphibian

Centrolene charapita, the Charapita glass frog is a species of frog in the family Centrolenidae. It is a relatively large frog, at 34.7–37 millimetres (1.37–1.46 in) long, and is dark green with yellow or pale green spots. The species is native to Ecuador and Peru.

Centrolene charapita was described in 2014, and is listed as Endangered by the IUCN.

== Taxonomy ==
Centrolene charapita was described in 2014, by Evan Twomey, Jesse Delia, and Santiago Castroviejo-Fisher. The type series was collected from Amazonas, Peru, in 2010.

Centrolene charapita was formerly considered a sister species to Centrolene geckoidea, though a 2020 analysis found Centrolene geckoidea to be sister to all other species of Centrolene.

== Distribution ==
Centrolene charapita is native to Ecuador (Zamora-Chinchipe) and Peru (Amazonas). Its extent of occurrence is around 614 square kilometres (237 sq mi).

The species occupies undisturbed forests. It is found in tropical lowland and montane forests, near water, and is present at elevations of 680–1,220 metres (2,230–4,000 ft). Other amphibians found in the same area as Centrolene charapita are Ameerega trivittata, Bolitoglossa altamazonica, Cochranella erminea, Hyloscirtus, Rulyrana mcdiarmidi, Pristimantis, and Rhaebo glaberrimus.

== Description ==
Centrolene charapita is relatively large for a glass frog, with a snout–vent length of 34.7–37 millimetres (1.37–1.46 in). In life, the back and sides are dark green, with yellow or pale green spots. The spots have enameled warts. The underside, flanks, and upper arms lack pigmentation. Parts of the peritoneum are visible through the underside, part of which is transparent. The bones are green.

Peruvian populations have a truncated or slightly rounded snout, whereas in Ecuadorian populations, the snout is rounded and sloping. Each vomer has a dentigerous process, each of which has four to six small teeth. The area between the nostrils is concave. The tympana are small and partially covered by skin. The upper lip is white. The iris is off-white to light grey, with yellow shades and black dots.

The forearms are stout and flattened. The legs are thin. There is webbing between the third and fourth toes, rudimentary webbing between the second and third toes, and no webbing between the first and second toes. The first finger has a nuptial pad.

The cloaca is covered by a fold of skin, and surrounded by four warts.

== Life history ==
Centrolene charapita calls from vegetation overhanging streams. Eggs have been found on a leaf overhanging a stream.

== Conservation ==
In 2021, the IUCN assessed Centrolene charapita as Endangered. The species is threatened by habitat loss, caused by agriculture and mining.

The species is listed in Appendix II of CITES. There are no quotas or suspensions in place for the species.

== Etymology ==
The specific epithet charapita refers to the yellow spots on the back of the frog. These resemble the Charapita pepper, which is found in the Amazonian lowlands.
