= Centrolene elisae =

Scientific classification
- Kingdom: Animalia
- Phylum: Chordata
- Class: Amphibia
- Order: Anura
- Family: Centrolenidae
- Genus: Centrolene
- Species: C. elisae

Binomial name
- Centrolene elisae Franco-Mena, Vega-Yánez, Reyes-Puig, and Guayasamin

Species of amphibian

Centrolene elisae, commonly known as Elisa's glassfrog, is a species of frog in the family Centrolenidae. The back is dark green, with small white spots. The species is endemic to Ecuador, and was described in 2024.

== Taxonomy ==
Centrolene elisae was described in 2024. The holotype is an adult male that was collected in Napo province, Ecuador, in 2011.

Centrolene elisae was previously confused with Centrolene buckleyi.

== Distribution ==
Centrolene elisae is endemic to Ecuador. It is found in Napo Province and Tungurahua Province, at elevations of 2,100–2,586 metres (6,890–8,484 ft).

The species is found in the cloud forests of the Ecuadorian Andes. It is syntopic with Nymphargus, Hyloscirtus sethmacfarlanei, Pristimantis donnelsoni, and Pristimantis marcoreyesi.

== Description ==
The males are 22.9–25.3 millimetres (0.90–1.00 in) long in snout-vent length. The head of males is 5.5–6.1 millimetres (0.22–0.24 in) long, and 6.9–7.9 millimetres (0.27–0.31 in) wide. The females are around 27.2 millimetres (1.07 in) long in snout-vent length, with a head measuring around 6.9 millimetres (0.27 in) long, and 8.1 millimetres (0.32 in) wide.

The snout is rounded. The upper lip is white. The eye is grey-white, and has black and brown stripes.

The back is dark green, with small white spots. The throat is pale green, and smooth. Most of the underside is pale green. The bones are green. Adult males have a curved, medium-sized humeral spine.

== Life history ==
Centrolene elisae is nocturnal, and calls from vegetation above streams. The advertisement call lasts around 0.2 seconds, and consists of two pulsed notes. The calls of closely related species consist of a single note.

== Nomenclature ==
The specific epithet elisae is a noun in the genitive case. It refers to the biologist Elisa Bonaccorso.

In English, the species is commonly known as Elisa's glassfrog. In Spanish, it is known as Rana de Cristal de Elisa.
