= Centrolene notosticta =

Conservation status
- Least Concern (IUCN 3.1)

Scientific classification
- Kingdom: Animalia
- Phylum: Chordata
- Class: Amphibia
- Order: Anura
- Family: Centrolenidae
- Genus: Centrolene
- Species: C. notosticta

Binomial name
- Centrolene notosticta Ruiz-Carranza and Lynch, 1991

Synonyms
- Centrolene notostictum

Species of frog

Centrolene notosticta (common name: cordillera giant glass frog) is a species of frog in the family Centrolenidae. It is found on the Cordillera Oriental in Colombia (Cundinamarca, Boyacá, Santander, and Norte de Santander departments) and on its extension to north, Serranía del Perijá, in the Zulia state in Venezuela.

== Description ==
Males measure 19–23 mm (0.75–0.91 in) in snout–vent length. They have a truncate snout and shagreen dorsum with spinules.

Centrolene notosticta is one of the few Centroleninae species in which females place egg clutches on undersides of leaves.

== Habitat and conservation ==
The species' natural habitats are old growth cloud forests where it occurs on streamside vegetation. Tadpoles develop in water. Its elevational range is 1,600–2,440 m (5,250–8,010 ft) asl.

It is an abundant species. Habitat loss and introduced species (trout) are threats, although it is not considered threatened as a whole.
