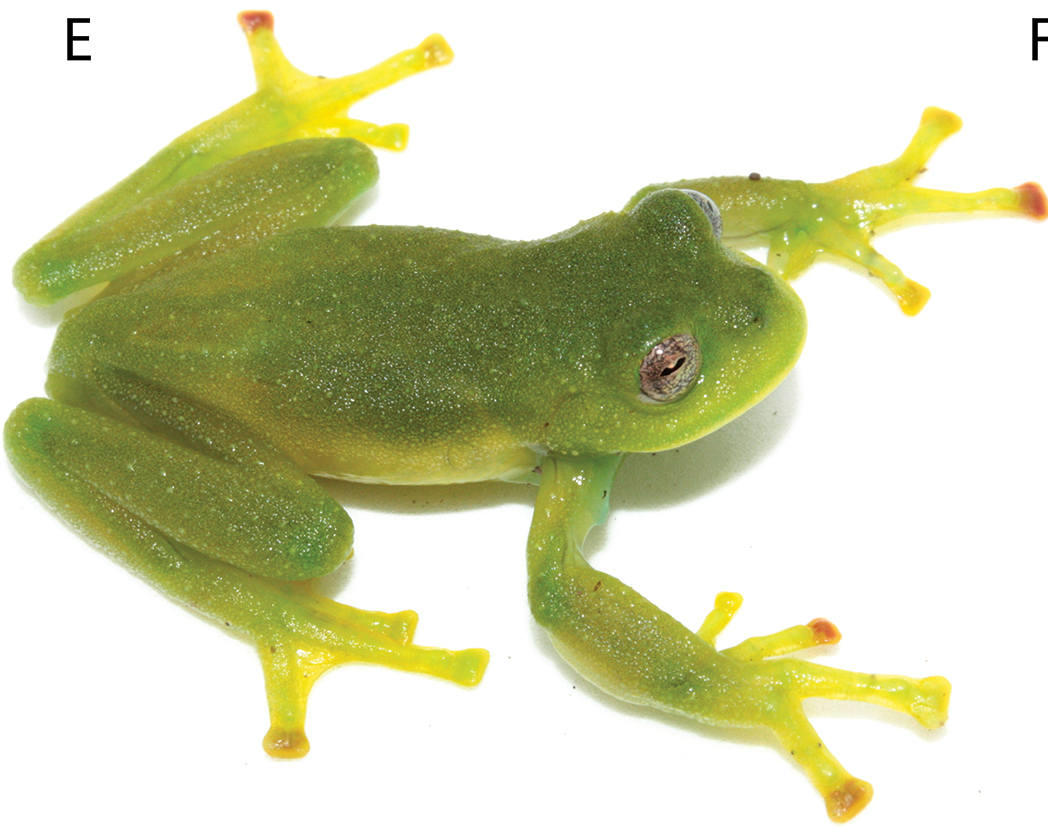

Scientific classification
- Kingdom: Animalia
- Phylum: Chordata
- Class: Amphibia
- Order: Anura
- Family: Centrolenidae
- Genus: Centrolene
- Species: C. camposi

Binomial name
- Centrolene camposi Cisneros-Heredia, Yánez-Muñoz, Sánchez-Nivicela, and Ron, 2023

= Centrolene camposi =

Species of amphibian

Centrolene camposi, commonly known as Campos’ glassfrog, is a species of frog in the family Centrolenidae. It is bright green, with greenish-yellow flanks, and green bones. The species is endemic to Ecuador.

Centrolene camposi was described in 2023, and is known only from the male. The species was named after Felipe Campos-Yánez, an Ecuadorian zoologist.

== Taxonomy ==
Centrolene camposi was described in 2023, by a team including Diego F. Cisneros-Heredia.

The holotype is an adult male that was collected in 2015. The type locality is in Ecuador's Azuay Province, near the border with El Oro Province, in the Cordillera Occidental.

A 2023 phylogenetic analysis found that the species is closely related to Centrolene condor. A 2024 study found that Centrolene kutuku and C. camposi are sister species.

== Distribution ==
The species is endemic to Ecuador, and known only from the type locality, where it was found in a small creek. It is sympatric with Centrolene ericsmithi, species of Pristimantis (including Pristimantis allpapuyu) and an unspecified species of Gastrotheca.

It inhabits evergreen montane forests, at elevations of around 2,950 metres (9,680 ft). The species is mostly arboreal.

== Description ==
The snout–vent length of males is 29.1–31.2 millimetres (1.15–1.23 in).

Unlike in other members of Centrolenidae, the vomer of Centrolene camposi lacks a dentigerous process. The snout is sloping and rounded. The tympanum has a barely visible ring, and a fold is present above it. The dorsal skin has low, rounded warts, and the ventral skin is granular. The outer layer of the peritoneum is white, and partially covered with iridophores. The pericardium is also covered with iridophores. In adult males, the humeral spine is projecting.

In life, the upper side is bright green. There is a yellowish line between the lip and the anterior quarter of the body. The flanks are greenish-yellow. The bones are green. The iris has a white background, is flesh-coloured towards the centre, and has thin brown lines. The hands and feet have melanophores.

The males call whilst on leaves. Female frogs and tadpoles are not known.

== Nomenclature ==
Centrolene camposi is commonly known as "Campos’ Glassfrog". The specific epithet refers to the Ecuadorian zoologist Felipe Campos-Yánez. The Spanish name is "Rana de Cristal de Campos".
