= Centrolene huilensis =

Conservation status
- Endangered (IUCN 3.1)

Scientific classification
- Kingdom: Animalia
- Phylum: Chordata
- Class: Amphibia
- Order: Anura
- Family: Centrolenidae
- Genus: Centrolene
- Species: C. huilensis

Binomial name
- Centrolene huilensis Ruiz-Carranza and Lynch, 1995

Synonyms
- Centrolene huilense

Species of frog

Centrolene huilensis is a species of frog in the family Centrolenidae. It is endemic to Colombia and only known from the region of its type locality near Isnos, on the Cordillera Central in the Huila Department.

== Description ==
Males measure 24–27 mm (0.94–1.06 in) in snout–vent length. Texture of dorsal skin of males is shagreen with spinules.

== Habitat and conservation ==
Its natural habitats are sub-Andean forests (cloud forests). It occurs on vegetation beside water sources or in streams. Major threat to this species is habitat destruction.
