= Giussepe Gagliardi-Urrutia =

Peruvian zoologist (born 1978)

Luis Alberto Giussepe Gagliardi-Urrutia
- Born: 31 July 1978 (age 48)
- Education: Universidad Nacional de la Amazonía Peruana, Pontifical Catholic University of Rio Grande do Sul
- Known for: Taxonomy and systematics of amphibians and reptiles
- Scientific career
- Fields: Zoology, Herpetology
- Workplaces: Instituto de Investigaciones de la Amazonía Peruana
- Author abbrev. (zoology): Gagliardi-Urrutia

Luis Alberto Giussepe Gagliardi-Urrutia (born 31 July 1978) is a Peruvian herpetologist and zoologist. He has a research career focused on the biodiversity, systematics, and taxonomy of amphibians and reptiles. He has participated in the description of a new genus and ten new species.

== Biography ==
Since 2001, Gagliardi-Urrutia has participated as coordinator and specialist in numerous scientific expeditions to the Peruvian Amazon. He was a researcher in the PIBA (Programa de Investigación en Biodiversidad Amazónica) at the Instituto de Investigaciones de la Amazonía Peruana between 2012 and 2016.

He earned his bachelor's degree in biological sciences in 2002 and his professional degree in Biology in 2010 from the Universidad Nacional de la Amazonía Peruana. He later obtained a PhD in Zoology from the Pontifical Catholic University of Rio Grande do Sul in Brazil.

== Taxa described ==
=== Genera ===
- Dryaderces Jungfer, Faivovich, Padial, Castroviejo-Fisher, Lyra, Berneck, Iglesias, Kok, MacCulloch, Rodrigues, Verdade, Torres-Gastello, Chaparro, Valdujo, Reichle, Moravec, Gvoždík, Gagliardi-Urrutia, Ernst, De la Riva, Means, Lima, Señaris, Wheeler & Haddad, 2013

=== Species ===
- Adenomera glauciae Carvalho, Simões, Gagliardi-Urrutia, Rojas-Runjaic, Haddad & Castroviejo-Fisher, 2020
- Allobates juami Simões, Gagliardi-Urrutia, Rojas-Runjaic & Castroviejo-Fisher, 2018
- Allobates liniaureum Jaramillo-Martínez, Vilà, Guayasamin, Gagliardi-Urrutia, Rojas-Runjaic, Simões, Chaparro, Aguilar-Manihuari & Castroviejo-Fisher, 2025
- Allobates sieggreenae Gagliardi-Urrutia, Castroviejo-Fisher, Rojas-Runjaic, Jaramillo, Solís & Simões, 2021
- Centrolene sabini Catenazzi, Von May, Lehr, Gagliardi-Urrutia & Guayasamin, 2012
- Phyzelaphryne nimio Simões, Costa, Rojas-Runjaic, Gagliardi-Urrutia, Sturaro, Peloso & Castroviejo-Fisher, 2018
- Pristimantis academicus Lehr, Moravec & Gagliardi-Urrutia, 2010
- Pristimantis iiap Padial, Gagliardi-Urrutia, Chaparro & Gutiérrez, 2016
- Pristimantis padiali Moravec, Lehr, Pérez Peña, López, Gagliardi-Urrutia & Tuanama, 2010
- Tepuihyla shushupe Ron, Venegas, Ortega-Andrade, Gagliardi-Urrutia & Salerno, 2016
