= Centrolene hybrida =

Conservation status
- Least Concern (IUCN 3.1)

Scientific classification
- Kingdom: Animalia
- Phylum: Chordata
- Class: Amphibia
- Order: Anura
- Family: Centrolenidae
- Genus: Centrolene
- Species: C. hybrida

Binomial name
- Centrolene hybrida Ruíz-Carranza & Lynch, 1991

Species of frog

Centrolene hybrida is a species of frog in the family Centrolenidae. It is endemic to Colombia. Its natural habitats are subtropical or tropical moist montane forests and rivers. It is not considered threatened by the IUCN.
