= Celsiella vozmedianoi =

Conservation status
- Endangered (IUCN 3.1)

Scientific classification
- Kingdom: Animalia
- Phylum: Chordata
- Class: Amphibia
- Order: Anura
- Family: Centrolenidae
- Genus: Celsiella
- Species: C. vozmedianoi

Binomial name
- Celsiella vozmedianoi (Ayarzagüena and Señaris, 1997)

Synonyms
- Cochranella vozmedianoi Ayarzagüena and Señaris, 1997

Species of frog

Celsiella vozmedianoi (in Spanish: ranita de cristal de Paria) is a species of frog in the family Centrolenidae, endemic to the Cerro El Humo, in the Paria Peninsula in northern Venezuela.

== Description ==
Males measure 26–28 mm (1.0–1.1 in) in snout–vent length and have shagreen dorsal skin with low warts. Snout is truncate.

== Habitat and conservation ==
Its natural habitat is tropical humid forest at 750–780 m (2,460–2,560 ft) asl. It occurs along streams. Eggs are laid on the upper sides of leaves overhanging streams. Its conservation status is uncertain, although habitat loss from agricultural development and the clearance of vegetation overhanging streams is a threat.
