= UNAP =

UNAP may refer to:

- Universidad Nacional del Altiplano de Puno (1856)
- United Nurses and Allied Professionals
- Universidad Nacional de la Amazonía Peruana (1961)
- Universidad Arturo Prat (1984)
