= "Cochranella" riveroi =

Conservation status
- Vulnerable (IUCN 3.1)

Scientific classification
- Kingdom: Animalia
- Phylum: Chordata
- Class: Amphibia
- Order: Anura
- Family: Centrolenidae
- Genus: "Cochranella"
- Species: "C." riveroi

Binomial name
- "Cochranella" riveroi (Ayarzagüena, 1992)

Synonyms
- Centrolenella riveroi Ayarzagüena, 1992

Species of frog

"Cochranella" riveroi is a species of frog in the family Centrolenidae. It is endemic to Cerro Aracamuni, Venezuela. The generic placement of this species within the subfamily Centroleninae is uncertain (incertae sedis).

== Taxonomy and systematics ==
This species was originally described as Centrolenella riveroi. However, most subsequent studies have placed it in the genus Cochranella. A study published in 2002 suggested that it belongs to the Cochranella spinosa group. However, morphological data do not allow unambiguous generic placement. With no molecular data available, it is—for the time being—retained in Cochranella.

== Description ==
Two adult males measured 21.6 and 22.1 mm (0.85 and 0.87 in) while a single female measured 25.0 mm (0.98 in) in snout–vent length; the female had 21 eggs 2.3–2.5 mm (0.091–0.098 in) in diameter in her ovaries. The tympanum is visible. The fingers are slightly webbed and the toes moderately webbed. The dorsal skin is strongly granular. The coloration of living specimens is unknown.

"Cochranella" riveroi is only known from Cerro Aracamuni, Venezuela

== Habitat and conservation ==
The type series was collected from terrestrial bromeliads at the summit of Cerro Aracamuni at about 1,600 m (5,200 ft) above sea level. The vegetation at the summit is mostly low (<1 m), with forested areas in depressions and along streams.

There are no known threats to this species, although its small range makes it vulnerable (Cerro Aracamuni is a tepui with a relatively small summit). It occurs in the Serranía de la Neblina National Park.
