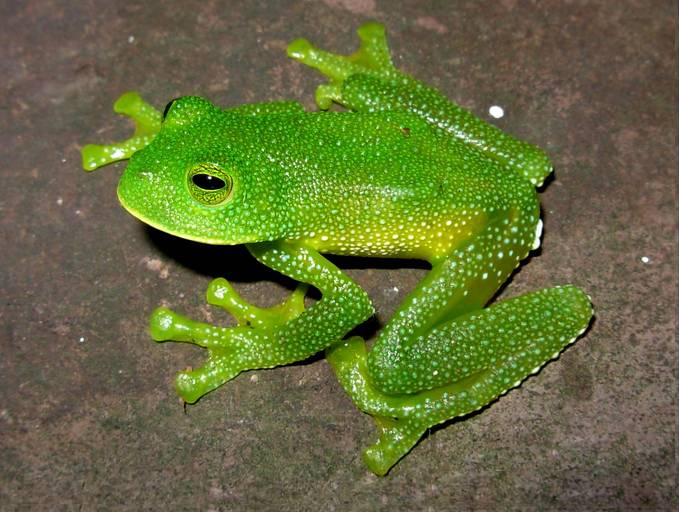

Conservation status
- Data Deficient (IUCN 3.1)

Scientific classification
- Kingdom: Animalia
- Phylum: Chordata
- Class: Amphibia
- Order: Anura
- Family: Centrolenidae
- Genus: Centrolene
- Species: C. paezorum

Binomial name
- Centrolene paezorum Ruíz-Carranza, Hernández-Camacho & Ardila-Robayo, 1986

= Centrolene paezorum =

Species of frog

Centrolene paezorum is a species of frog in the family Centrolenidae. It is endemic to Colombia. Its natural habitats are subtropical or tropical moist montane forests and rivers.

== Sources ==
- Wild, E.; Lynch, J. (2004). "Centrolene paezorum". IUCN Red List of Threatened Species. 2004 e.T54929A11227263. doi:10.2305/IUCN.UK.2004.RLTS.T54929A11227263.en.
