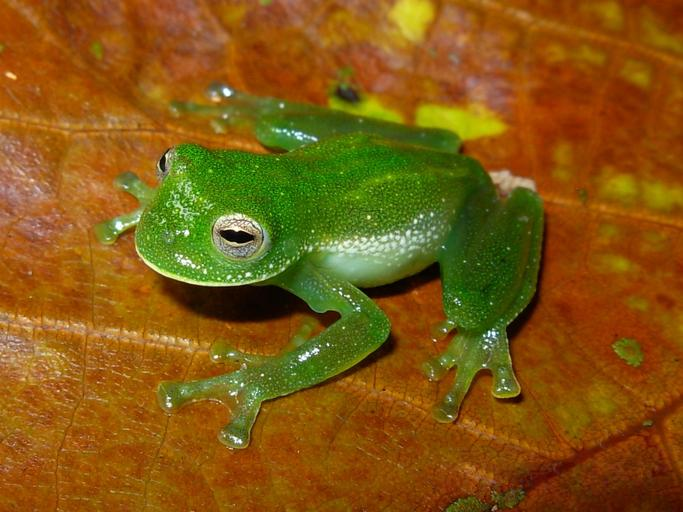
- C. antioquiensis photographed in Falan

Conservation status
- Near Threatened (IUCN 3.1)
- CITES Appendix II

Scientific classification
- Kingdom: Animalia
- Phylum: Chordata
- Class: Amphibia
- Order: Anura
- Family: Centrolenidae
- Genus: Centrolene
- Species: C. antioquiensis

Binomial name
- Centrolene antioquiensis (Noble, 1920)

Synonyms
- Centrolenella antioquiensis Noble, 1920

= Centrolene antioquiensis =

Species of frog

Centrolene antioquiensis, commonly known as the Antioquia giant glass frog, is a species of frog in the family Centrolenidae that is endemic to Colombia. Water pollution from agriculture, and more locally deforestation, threatens this species.

== Range and habitat ==
C. antioquiensis is known only from the slopes of the Cordillera Central in the Colombian departments of Antioquia, Caldas, and Tolima. It can be found in riparian montane forests at elevations of 1,730–2,450 m (5,680–8,040 ft) above sea level, and appears to mostly inhabit the canopy.

== Conservation status ==
C. antioquiensis is listed as near threatened by the International Union for the Conservation of Nature, with its extent of occurrence estimated at 11,740 km^{2} (4,530 sq mi). It may occur within a protected area, the Parque Nacional Natural Selva de Florencia, but further research is needed to determine its full distribution, ecology, and population size. The natural habitat of this species is in decline as a result of deforestation and water pollution caused by agricultural runoff.
