= Celsiella revocata =

El Tovar Glass Frog

Conservation status
- Vulnerable (IUCN 3.1)

Scientific classification
- Kingdom: Animalia
- Phylum: Chordata
- Class: Amphibia
- Order: Anura
- Family: Centrolenidae
- Genus: Celsiella
- Species: C. revocata

Binomial name
- Celsiella revocata (Rivero, 1985)

Synonyms
- Centrolenella revocata Rivero, 1985; Hyalinobatrachium revocatum (Rivero, 1985); Cochranella revocatum (Rivero, 1985)

Species of frog

Celsiella revocata is a species of frog in the family Centrolenidae. It is endemic to the Venezuelan Coastal Range. Its common name, El Tovar glass frog, refers to its type locality, Colonia Tovar. Its natural habitats are montane forests along streams; it is usually found on vegetation above the streams.

Celsiella revocata is a common frog in undisturbed habitats but threatened by habitat loss. Its total population is decreasing.
