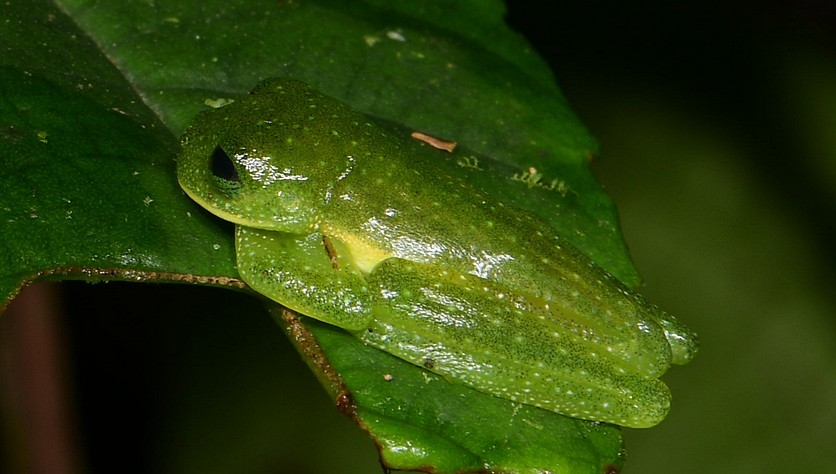
- C. ballux in Pichincha, Ecuador

Conservation status
- Endangered (IUCN 3.1)

Scientific classification
- Kingdom: Animalia
- Phylum: Chordata
- Class: Amphibia
- Order: Anura
- Family: Centrolenidae
- Genus: Centrolene
- Species: C. ballux

Binomial name
- Centrolene ballux (Duellman and Burrowes, 1989)

Synonyms
- Centrolenella ballux Duellman and Burrowes, 1989

= Centrolene ballux =

Species of frog

Centrolene ballux is a species of frog in the family Centrolenidae. It is known from a few disjunct localities on the Pacific versant of the Cordillera Occidental in southern Colombia (Nariño Department) and northern Ecuador (Pichincha and Santo Domingo de los Tsáchilas Provinces). Common names golden-flecked glassfrog and Burrowes' giant glass frog have been coined for it.

== Etymology ==
The specific name ballux is Latin meaning "gold dust", in reference to the tiny gold flecks on the dorsum.

== Description ==
Adult males measure 19–22 mm (0.75–0.87 in) and females 21–23 mm (0.83–0.91 in) in snout–vent length. The snout is rounded. Both fingers and toes are webbed. The tympanum is visible. The dorsum is dark lime green and has minute pale gold-white flecks, which are most numerous on the hind limbs. The tips of digits are yellowish green. The venter is translucent.

== Habitat and conservation ==
Its natural habitats are humid upper montane forests at elevations of 1,700–2,340 m (5,580–7,680 ft) above sea level. It occurs in vegetation some 50 to 200 cm above the ground, typically near streams or ditches. Breeding takes place in streams. It is an endangered species due to climate change (which changes humidity) and habitat loss, possibly also introduced predatory fish as well as pollution and chytridiomycosis. It occurs in Reserva La Planada (private) in Colombia and in Reserva Las Gralarias in Ecuador.
