= "Cochranella" duidaeana =

Conservation status
- Vulnerable (IUCN 3.1)

Scientific classification
- Kingdom: Animalia
- Phylum: Chordata
- Class: Amphibia
- Order: Anura
- Family: Centrolenidae
- Genus: "Cochranella"
- Species: "C." duidaeana

Binomial name
- "Cochranella" duidaeana (Ayarzagüena, 1992)

Synonyms
- Centrolenella duidaeana Ayarzagüena, 1992

Species of frog

"Cochranella" duidaeana, commonly known as the Duida Cochran frog, is a species of frog in the family Centrolenidae. It is endemic to Cerro Duida, Venezuela. The generic placement of this species within the subfamily Centroleninae is uncertain (incertae sedis).

== Taxonomy and systematics ==
This species was originally described as Centrolenella duidaeana. However, most subsequent studies have placed it in the genus Cochranella. A study published in 2002 suggested that it belongs to the Cochranella spinosa group. However, morphological data do not allow unambiguous generic placement. With no molecular data available, it is for the time being retained in Cochranella.

== Description ==
Adult males measure 20.8–22.1 mm (0.82–0.87 in) in snout–vent length; females are unknown. The tympanum is inconspicuous. The dorsum is uniformly green. The iris is greenish-yellowish. Dorsal skin is finely granular.

"Cochranella" duidaeana is only known from Cerro Duida, Venezuela

== Habitat and conservation ==
The species is known from the southern tip of the summit of Cerro Duida at an elevation of about 2,140 m (7,020 ft) above sea level. It occurs in shrubs in montane forest along streams.

There are no known threats to this species. It occurs in the Duida-Marahuaca National Park.
