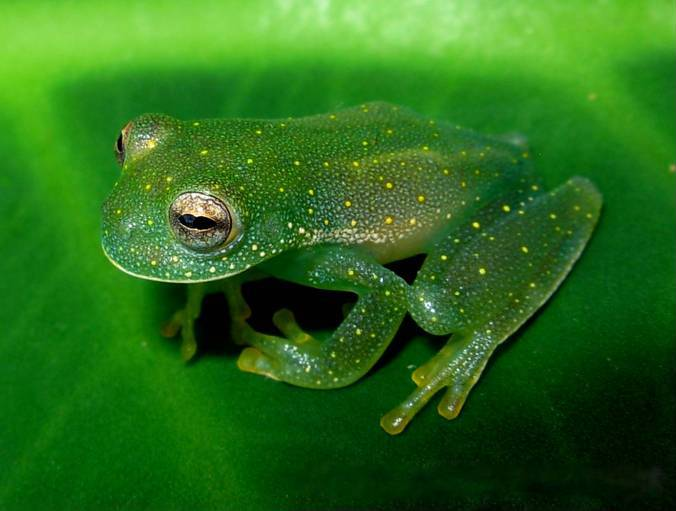

Conservation status
- Least Concern (IUCN 3.1)

Scientific classification
- Kingdom: Animalia
- Phylum: Chordata
- Class: Amphibia
- Order: Anura
- Family: Centrolenidae
- Genus: Centrolene
- Species: C. savagei

Binomial name
- Centrolene savagei (Ruiz-Carranza and Lynch, 1991)

Synonyms
- Cochranella savagei Ruiz-Carranza and Lynch, 1991

= Centrolene savagei =

Species of frog

Centrolene savagei is a species of frog in the family Centrolenidae that is endemic to the Andes of western Colombia, specifically the Cordillera Occidental and Cordillera Central. Its common name is Savage's Cochran frog.

== Description ==
Centrolene savagei is a small glassfrog: adult females measure about 24 mm (0.9 in) in snout–vent length and adult males 20–24 mm (0.8–0.9 in) in snout–vent length, It has a wide head with a rounded snout and bulging eyes, and a slender body. The fingers and toes are tipped with adhesive pads. The body and legs are liberally covered with rounded whitish warts. The dorsal surface is bright green speckled with white or pale green, which makes it well-camouflaged on leaves, and the underparts are white and semi-transparent; the bones are green. The species has a number of defenses such as foul-smelling skin secretions and a variety of defensive postures and behaviors.

== Reproduction ==
Adult male Centrolene savagei call at night after there has been rain during the day. The male advertisement call consists of 1–3 "peep" notes, each about 17 milliseconds in length (range 10–22 ms), and separated by silent intervals 302–442 ms in duration. Larger males have lower-pitch calls and higher mating success. Females lay 15–27 cream-coloured eggs on leaves; males can guard the eggs for 24 hours or more. The newly hatched tadpole drop off the leaves into the water below. Tadpoles grow up to 33 mm (1.3 in) in length.

== Habitat and conservation ==
Its natural habitats are sub-Andean and Andean forests at elevations of 1,230–2,050 m (4,000–6,700 ft) above sea level. Its typical habitat is trees and vegetation close to running water. It can also occur in secondary forests. It is currently listed as "Least Concern" on the IUCN Redlist. Its distribution is fragmented and relatively limited in area, and its habitat is lost to agriculture (crops and livestock) and pollution.
