= Centrolene peristicta =

Conservation status
- Least Concern (IUCN 3.1)

Scientific classification
- Kingdom: Animalia
- Phylum: Chordata
- Class: Amphibia
- Order: Anura
- Family: Centrolenidae
- Genus: Centrolene
- Species: C. peristicta

Binomial name
- Centrolene peristicta (Lynch & Duellman, 1973)

Synonyms
- Centrolene peristictum

Species of frog

Centrolene peristictum is a species of frog in the family Centrolenidae. It is found in Colombia and Ecuador. Its natural habitats are subtropical or tropical moist montane forests and rivers. It is threatened by habitat loss.
