= Centrolene lynchi =

Conservation status
- Endangered (IUCN 3.1)

Scientific classification
- Kingdom: Animalia
- Phylum: Chordata
- Class: Amphibia
- Order: Anura
- Family: Centrolenidae
- Genus: Centrolene
- Species: C. lynchi

Binomial name
- Centrolene lynchi (Duellman, 1980)

Synonyms
- Centrolenella lynchi Duellman, 1980; Centrolenella scirtetes Duellman and Burrowes, 1989; Centrolene gemmata Flores, 1985; Centrolene scirtetes Duellman and Burrowes, 1989

Species of frog

Centrolene lynchi, also known as Lynch's giant glass frog, Lynch's glassfrog, and the Tandayapa giant glass frog, is a species of frog in the family Centrolenidae. It is found in the Risaralda Department and Nariño Department on the Cordillera Occidental of Colombia and on the western Andes in the Pichincha, Cotopaxi, and Santo Domingo de los Tsáchilas Provinces, Ecuador. It is named after John Douglas Lynch, the herpetologist who collected the first specimens of this species.

== Description ==
Giant by name only, these frogs are still larger than many of their relatives: males measure 23–27 mm (0.91–1.06 in) in snout–vent length and females about 25 mm (0.98 in) in snout–vent length. Dorsum is yellowish-greenish with tiny whitish tubercles and black spots.

== Habitat and conservation ==
The species' natural habitats are cloud forests (including secondary ones) along streams at elevations of 1,140–2,075 m (3,740–6,808 ft) above sea level. It requires forest vegetation overhanging water. It has greatly declined in Ecuador, likely because of changing climate, but it is also threatened by habitat loss, alien species, pollution, and chytridiomycosis. It is present in Reserve Las Gralarias and Reserva Estacion Experimental La Favorita, Ecuador.
