= Centrolene heloderma =

Conservation status
- Vulnerable (IUCN 3.1)

Scientific classification
- Kingdom: Animalia
- Phylum: Chordata
- Class: Amphibia
- Order: Anura
- Family: Centrolenidae
- Genus: Centrolene
- Species: C. heloderma

Binomial name
- Centrolene heloderma (Duellman, 1981)

Synonyms
- Centrolenella heloderma Duellman, 1981

Species of frog

Centrolene heloderma is a species of frog in the family Centrolenidae from the Andes in Colombia and Ecuador. It is also known as Pichincha giant glass frog or bumpy glassfrog.

== Distribution ==
In Colombia it has been recorded from the western slopes of the Cordillera Occidental, in the Cauca, Risaralda, and Valle del Cauca Departments. In Ecuador it has been recorded from the western Andes in the Pichincha and Santo Domingo de los Tsáchilas Provinces.

== Description ==
Centrolene heloderma are small frogs (although among the generally small Centrolene, they are relatively large): males measure 27–32 mm (1.1–1.3 in) in snout–vent length and females 32 mm (1.3 in) (based on one frog only). It has uniformly green dorsum covered with whitish tubercles. Its snout has a characteristic obtuse profile. Females lay clutches up to 29 eggs on the upper side of leaves and very high from the water level. Upon hatching, the tadpoles drop down and develop in fast-flowing water.

== Habitat and conservation ==
Centrolene heloderma inhabits the upper elevations of cloud forest, and is only found in mature forest. It is an uncommon frog that is active at night and difficult to see. However, males can be heard calling from the vegetation near streams and waterfalls.

In Ecuador Centrolene heloderma has disappeared from two known locations (including the type locality where it was last seen in 1979) and is now only known from one location. In Colombia it was last recorded in 1996. Its disappearance has been attributed to changing climatic patterns, with habitat loss, alien predatory fish, pollution, and chytridiomycosis as other potential contributing factors.
