= Centrolene solitaria =

Conservation status
- Endangered (IUCN 3.1)

Scientific classification
- Kingdom: Animalia
- Phylum: Chordata
- Class: Amphibia
- Order: Anura
- Family: Centrolenidae
- Genus: Centrolene
- Species: C. solitaria

Binomial name
- Centrolene solitaria (Ruíz-Carranza & Lynch, 1991)

Synonyms
- Cochranella solitaria Ruíz-Carranza & Lynch, 1991

Species of amphibian

Centrolene solitaria (common name: lonely Cochran frog) is a species of frog in the family Centrolenidae. Known only from its type locality in Florencia, Caquetá, it is endemic to Colombia.

Centrolene solitaria occurs in vegetation near streams in cloud forests, including secondary forests. A major threat to this species is habitat loss.
