= Celsiella =

Scientific classification
- Kingdom: Animalia
- Phylum: Chordata
- Class: Amphibia
- Order: Anura
- Family: Centrolenidae
- Subfamily: Hyalinobatrachinae
- Genus: Celsiella; Guayasamin, Castroviejo-Fisher, Linda Trueb, Ayarzagüena, Rada, and Vilà, 2009

Type species
- Centrolenella revocata Rivero, 1985

Diversity
- 2 species (see text)

Genus of amphibians

Celsiella is a small genus of glass frogs endemic to Venezuela. It was established in 2009 and named in honour of Josefa Celsa Señaris, nicknamed "Celsi", a Venezuelan herpetologist who had worked with glass frogs.

== Description ==
The ventral parietal peritoneum is white anteriorly and transparent posteriorly. The bones are pale green or green.

Male Celsiella call from, and females deposit their eggs on the underside or upper side of leaves. Tentative evidence suggests that males guard their eggs.

== Taxonomy ==
Monophyly of Celsiella is strongly supported by genetic data. It is also morphologically distinct from the closely related genus Hyalinobatrachium species of which have completely transparent venters, white liver, and white bones. It was erected in 2009; its species composition has not changed afterwards.

== Species ==
There are two species:

- Celsiella revocata (Rivero, 1985)
- Celsiella vozmedianoi (Ayarzagüena and Señaris, 1997)
