= Centrolene daidalea =

Conservation status
- Least Concern (IUCN 3.1)

Scientific classification
- Kingdom: Animalia
- Phylum: Chordata
- Class: Amphibia
- Order: Anura
- Family: Centrolenidae
- Genus: Centrolene
- Species: C. daidalea

Binomial name
- Centrolene daidalea (Ruíz-Carranza & Lynch, 1991)

Synonyms
- Cochranella daidalea Ruíz-Carranza & Lynch, 1991; Centrolene daidaleum

Species of amphibian

Centrolene daidalea (common name: Alban Cochran frog) is a species of frog in the family Centrolenidae. It is known from Colombia and Venezuela.

Centrolene daidalea inhabits vegetation near streams in premontane and cloud forests. It has also been recorded from secondary forests. It is threatened by habitat loss and fragmentation.
