= Centrolene hesperia =

Conservation status
- Endangered (IUCN 3.1)

Scientific classification
- Kingdom: Animalia
- Phylum: Chordata
- Class: Amphibia
- Order: Anura
- Family: Centrolenidae
- Genus: Centrolene
- Species: C. hesperia

Binomial name
- Centrolene hesperia (Cadle & McDiarmid, 1990)

Synonyms
- Centrolene hesperium

Species of frog

Centrolene hesperia is a species of frog in the family Centrolenidae. It is endemic to Peru. Its natural habitats are subtropical or tropical moist montane forests and rivers. It is threatened by habitat loss.
