= Centrolene muelleri =

Conservation status
- Data Deficient (IUCN 3.1)

Scientific classification
- Kingdom: Animalia
- Phylum: Chordata
- Class: Amphibia
- Order: Anura
- Family: Centrolenidae
- Genus: Centrolene
- Species: C. muelleri

Binomial name
- Centrolene muelleri Duellman and Schulte, 1993

Species of frog

Centrolene muelleri is a species of frog in the family Centrolenidae. It is endemic to Peru and is known from the divide between the Huallaga and Marañón drainages, in the San Martín and Amazonas departments. The specific name muelleri honors Paul S. Müller, professor from Saarland University who supported Schulte's field work in Peru. This species is also known as Muller's giant glass frog and Müller's giant glass frog.

== Habitat and conservation ==
Centrolene muelleri occurs in cloud forest at elevations of 1,830–2,050 m (6,000–6,730 ft) above sea level and in associated with streams. Calling males have been observed on the upper surfaces of leaves 0.5–2.5 m (2–8 ft) above the water. Egg clutches are probably laid on leaves above streams.

This species seems to be associated with undisturbed habitats. It is probably negatively affected by habitat loss that is occurring in its range. Chytridiomycosis might also be a risk. It could be present in the Alto Mayo Protection Forest.
