= Centrolene pipilata =

Conservation status
- Critically endangered, possibly extinct (IUCN 3.1)

Scientific classification
- Kingdom: Animalia
- Phylum: Chordata
- Class: Amphibia
- Order: Anura
- Family: Centrolenidae
- Genus: Centrolene
- Species: C. pipilata

Binomial name
- Centrolene pipilata (Lynch & Duellman, 1973)

Synonyms
- Centrolene pipilatum

Species of frog

Centrolene pipilata, commonly known as the Amazon giant glass frog, is a species of frog in the family Centrolenidae. It is endemic to Ecuador. Its natural habitats are subtropical or tropical moist montane forests and rivers. It is threatened by habitat loss.
