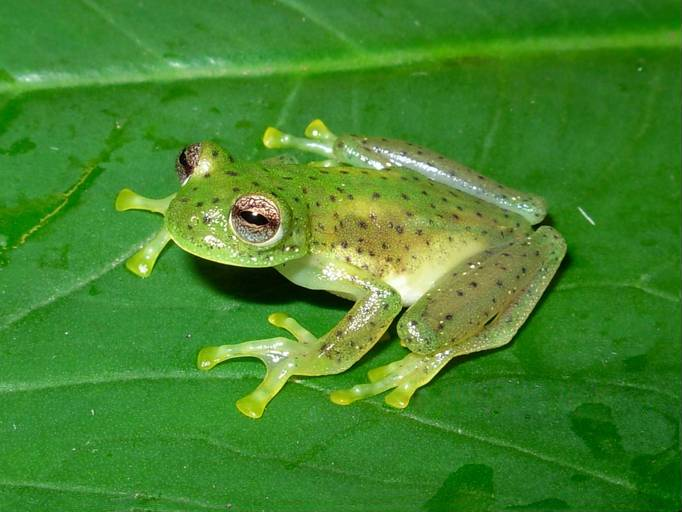

Conservation status
- Vulnerable (IUCN 3.1)

Scientific classification
- Kingdom: Animalia
- Phylum: Chordata
- Class: Amphibia
- Order: Anura
- Family: Centrolenidae
- Genus: "Centrolene"
- Species: "C." quindianum

Binomial name
- "Centrolene" quindianum Ruíz-Carranza & Lynch, 1995

= "Centrolene" quindianum =

Species of frog

"Centrolene" quindianum is a species of frog in the family Centrolenidae. It is endemic to the Andes of Colombia and is considered a threatened species due to habitat destruction. Its natural habitats are subtropical or tropical moist montane forests and rivers. "C." quindianum is known to have two types of calls, one composed of only two notes and the other composed of three to five notes with its most frequently used one being the former.
