= "Centrolene" petrophilum =

Conservation status
- Endangered (IUCN 3.1)

Scientific classification
- Kingdom: Animalia
- Phylum: Chordata
- Class: Amphibia
- Order: Anura
- Family: Centrolenidae
- Genus: "Centrolene"
- Species: "C." petrophilum

Binomial name
- "Centrolene" petrophilum Ruíz-Carranza & Lynch, 1991

Species of frog

"Centrolene" petrophilum, the Boyaca giant glass frog, is a species of frog in the family Centrolenidae.

It is endemic to Colombia, where its natural habitats are subtropical or tropical moist montane forests and rivers. The species is threatened by habitat loss, such as from mining; deforestation due to logging; and intensive agriculture, including livestock ranching, grazing, and crop cultivation.

== Description ==
The species is sexually dimorphic. Females lack the facial present in males. Females reach 27.4–31.38 millimetres (1.079–1.235 in) and males reach 25–30 millimetres (0.98–1.18 in) in snout to vent length.

== Habitat and conservation ==
The species occurs in tropical forests and inland wetlands, as well as secondary forest. It is found in six geographical sites on the eastern flank of the northern portion of the Cordillera Oriental, Boyacá Department, Colombia. This species lives on vegetation in rocky areas. It has an upper elevation limit of 2200 meters and a lower elevation limit of 1600 meters.

The species is endangered due to deforestation and mining. As of 2016, the population is thought to be decreasing.

== Reproduction ==
Females lay eggs on the sides of rocks in streams, and the larvae develop in the water. Males will defend and take care of the eggs.

== See also ==
- Cloud forest
- Secondary forest
- Sexual dimorphism

== Sources ==
- "Centrolene petrophilum". Encyclopedia of Life.
