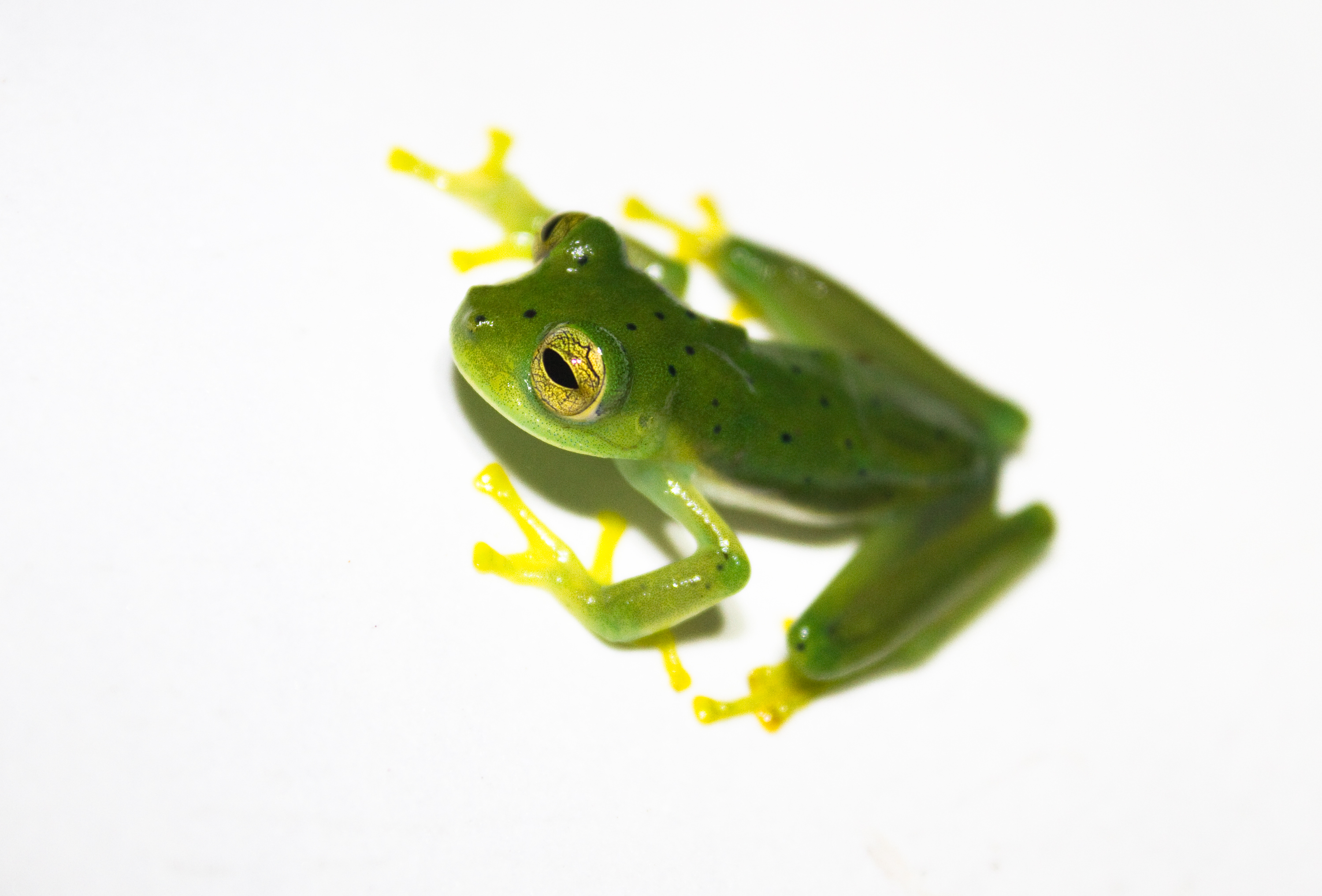

Conservation status
- Least Concern (IUCN 3.1)

Scientific classification
- Kingdom: Animalia
- Phylum: Chordata
- Class: Amphibia
- Order: Anura
- Family: Centrolenidae
- Genus: Espadarana
- Species: E. prosoblepon

Binomial name
- Espadarana prosoblepon (Boettger, 1892)

Synonyms
- Hyla prosoblepon Boettger, 1892; Centrolene prosoblepon (Boettger, 1892); Hyla parabambae Boulenger, 1898; Hylella puncticrus Boulenger, 1896; Hyla ocellifera Boulenger, 1899; Cochranella ocellifera (Boulenger, 1899)

= Espadarana prosoblepon =

Species of amphibian

Espadarana prosoblepon is a species of frog in the family Centrolenidae, commonly known as the emerald glass frog or Nicaragua giant glass frog. This species can be found in Ecuador, Colombia, Panama, Costa Rica, Nicaragua, and Honduras. Its natural habitats are lowland tropical forests and montane cloud forests. It is a nocturnal species occurring in low vegetation in mature forests only. It is not considered threatened overall by the IUCN although deforestation and pollution are potential threats, as is chytridiomycosis.

The word "prosoblepon" originates from the Greek words "proso" and "blepo", which respectively mean "forward, in front" and "see, look", and is thought to signify the frontal position of the eyes in the emerald glass frog.

== General description ==
Espadarana prosoblepon is listed as least concern according to IUCN in the red list category and criteria when it was assessed in 2020. It was listed as least concern because of its wide distribution, large population, and its improbable decline. The emerald glass frog has a lifespan of more than 5 years. It is physically described to be small, green, and may occasionally have dark spots on its back. It has a translucent body for camouflage, green bones and both males and females have humeral hooks (larger in males) which they use for fighting. It is native to Colombia, Costa Rica, Ecuador, Honduras, Nicaragua and Panama. It breeds during rainy season (May to November) and the males tend to be territorial. The space between male territories are dependent on calling. As for calling, the males will call from leaf branches.

=== Morphology ===
Espadarana prosoblepon is considered to be medium in size, measuring 2.1–2.8 cm in males and 2.5–3.1 cm in females. During the tadpole phase, its length is around 1.2 cm and has dorsal eyes and nostrils. It is distinguished from the other glass frogs by having a protruding humeral spine in males and membranes between fingers 3 and 4 of its hand. In terms of sexual dimorphism; males have humeral hooks. In terms of size, males are around 0.11 g, and snout to vent are about 2.5 cm. Male body size and humeral spine size is different among individuals, but these qualities don't determine success during aggressive interactions. The head of E. prosoblepon is wide and seems round when observed overhead. Its eyes are large and protruding with a small space between the eyes. It does not have a tympanum (or cannot be seen). It has vomerine teeth and due to its translucent smooth skin, its bones and intestines are visible (intestines less so due to white membrane cover). Its fingers vary in length (finger 1 is longer than finger 2) and are webbed.

=== Colouration ===
While the morphology of E. prosoblepon is relatively consistent, its coloration pattern is especially variable. These variable patterns and colorations include populations that are yellow, black and green. During the tadpole phase its color is black and then later changes to brown/red. Its dorsal exteriors are emerald green (hence the name) and may have black specks. The color of its fingers is faintly paler than the rest of its body and its bones are green due to biliverdin presence. The iris is usually gray or silver with dark outlines.

== Reproduction ==
The emerald green frog, like most other frogs, are oviparous and polygynandrous. Their mating season lasts from May to November, which is the wet season in their region. Some studies suggest that there is a positive correlation between rainfall and number of clutches laid.

=== Mating ===
Males tend to have high fidelity to their ovipository sites. During mating season, the male establishes his territory in a tree, usually on a leaf, and emits a call to attract females to his site. He defends this territory throughout the time he is searching for a mate as well as after the eggs are deposited for a period of time. When a female approaches, the male engages her in amplexus and continues calling. This lasts for about 174 minutes and the calls are strongest during amplexus and after egg deposition. The mating pair may stay in one location or move up to 2 m away from the original site. Males generally tend to one clutch at a time, but have been reported to tend to up to four at a time. The female deposits her eggs on the upper side of a leaf, a mossy rocks or branches, generally 0–3 m above the water. Once the female deposits her eggs they are fertilized by the male's sperm, the male may rub his legs on the sides of the female's body, and she may stay for minutes or hours, and then leaves without returning. Although large male size does not seem to be correlated with mating success, larger females tend to lay clutches with more eggs in them. This reproductive behavior is generally constant throughout emerald glass frog's range.

=== Development ===
These frogs begin as eggs laid on land, develop as aquatic tadpoles, then return to land in their adult life stage. After deposition, the eggs take 8–20 days to develop. Tadpoles drop into the water underneath them and are often born when it is raining, which is said to be a camouflage technique. The hatchlings are 12 mm in length, and have specialized mouth parts for attaching to substrate in the stream. After hatching they congregate and remain in the leaf litter and sediment for several months and once they are fully developed into adults they become terrestrial animals.

=== Egg clutches ===
Eggs are laid in clutches of 10 to 40 eggs and are black in color, and each about 10mm in diameter. The eggs are deposited together and form a jelly covered monolayer that is usually about 50 mm in diameter.

=== Parental care ===
Females generally exhibit less parental care than males do. A female may remain near her eggs for a period of time up to several hours after deposition, but males have been reported to guard the eggs as they guard their territory. There has been no evidence that female parental care benefits the clutch, whereas male parental care has been seen to increase success.

== Habitat ==
Emerald glass frogs prefer humid terrestrial or aquatic habitats in rainforests and wet forests. They have both terrestrial and aquatic life stages, so they tend to live in vegetation beside streams. They prefer shallow streams because there are more rocks and logs that have vegetation on them for depositing eggs, where less flooding occurs.

== Distribution and range ==
The range of the emerald glass frog is from eastern Honduras, Nicaragua, Costa Rica, and Panama, to the Pacific slopes of Colombia and Ecuador. In Colombia, it is found in the northern and eastern areas (along Cordillera Oriental and in the Magdalena Valley). It is also found along the Caribbean and along the Pacific slopes. It is frequently recorded in Costa Rica. It has declined drastically in Monteverde, Costa Rica since the mid-1980s. While this may require further investigation, recorded declines in Costa Rica might be due to the chytridiomycosis disease. Different Costa Rican populations have shown stability and, in some places, (Zarcero for example), the emerald glass frog is the most common glass frog within the area. Moreover, it is shown to be common in Panama, Nicaragua, Ecuador and reasonably common in Honduras and Colombia. It currently has a stable population trend and is not considered to be fragmented. Strong site fidelity has been shown by the emerald glass frog, and its preferred system is terrestrial and freshwater. As for the home range; the emerald glass frog shows strong fidelity within around 2 meters, and it is suggested that migration is a possibility. Furthermore, studies have shown that the activity of males and females increased with rainfall.

The frog's range includes at least one protected park, including the Ranita Dorada Amphibian Reserve.

=== Altitude ===
Espadarana prosoblepon is found at elevations ranging from 20 to 1500 meters in zones that are humid such as forests and rainforests. It appears to be more common at higher altitudes due to the presence of more stream habitats near rivers and streams. It has been found that the maximum elevation limit 1500 meters (above sea level). In terms of habitat in these altitudes, the emerald glass frog prefers vegetated areas that are dense such as evergreen forests along banks of rapid streams where it breeds by laying its eggs on nearby leaves.

== Behaviour ==
The emerald glass frog's activity is nocturnal, and increased during rainfall. Males are territorial and have high site fidelity which can lead to aggression. In the event of combat, males have humeral hooks that they use for grappling with other males.

=== Feeding ===
Adults are carnivorous, primarily eating insects, whereas tadpoles can be both carnivorous and herbivorous. Tadpoles eat algae, aquatic invertebrates as well as other tadpoles.

=== Fighting ===
Male emerald glass frogs have large humeral spines that they use for combat. The size varies amongst individuals and tends to be correlated with who wins the interaction. If a male's territory is encroached upon the two males will engage in a grappling match that can last up to 30 minutes. This is more common in areas of high male density than in areas of low male density. Males in combat hang by their toes on the same or nearby vegetation and seize each other front to front, hooking their humeral hooks in the other's axial region. When this ritual is over, the males may make a peep sound, or simply jump to another location on the tree. The aggressive interaction is over when one male jumps to another (lower) leaf or flattens his body against the leaf signifying submissiveness.

=== Calling ===
Though most vocal during the wet season, it has been reported that these frogs call throughout the year. The call is used to attract a female to his territory and consists of short "chee-chee-chee", with intermittent chirp sequences. The rate of this call ranges from 1 to 43 calls per hour, with a duration of 1.5–3 seconds. The call is most intense whilst engaged in amplexus as well as after egg deposition. When a male is in close proximity to another male, they call in a short series of rapid beeps. Higher mating success has been seen to be correlated to longer length of calling.

== History ==
In the past thirty years there has been a major decline (about 40%) in amphibian populations in South America, with the emerald tree frog among them. This sudden population drop was strange and perplexing because there was very little disturbance in the area. After some research in the affected areas, there was speculation that the decline was a result of the fungus Batrachochytrium dendrobatidis, which causes chytridiomycosis in amphibians. Espadarana prosoblepon populations have remained relatively stable after the major population decline, keeping them on the IUCN species of least concern list.

== Threats ==
The emerald glass frog substantially declined in Monteverde, Costa Rica since the 1980s, though it has shown stability in other near areas. There may be multiple causes for the decline including habitat destruction, negative agriculture, chemical implementation and disease. Espadarana prosoblepon is threatened by Chytrid fungus (Batrachochytrium dendrobatidis) which causes chytridiomycosis that disrupts its skin and respiratory system. Some frogs tend to be less threatened by B. dendrobatidis due to the variation in their physiology. The emerald glass frog was able to persist during its decline which indicates high resistance to B. dendrobatidis. Another threat is a chytrid collapse, which is when the majority of the population rapidly declines while a few persist. There is very little information regarding predation but crabs and other small predators such as spiders have been reported to feed on E. prosoblepon. Generally, threats to the emerald glass frogs are related to its habitat such as deforestation, human intrusion and pollution resulting from illegal crop spraying.

== Conservation ==
An example of conserving E. prosoblepon is evident in Ecuador because its distribution overlaps with reserves such as the Mache-Chindul Ecological Reserve and the Cotacachi Cayapas Ecological Reserve. It is also found in many protected areas in Colombia and within its range in Central America. The emerald glass frog generally has a wide distribution and consists of large populations which is why it has not attracted conservation efforts.
