= Centrolene sanchezi =

Conservation status
- Endangered (IUCN 3.1)

Scientific classification
- Kingdom: Animalia
- Phylum: Chordata
- Class: Amphibia
- Order: Anura
- Family: Centrolenidae
- Genus: Centrolene
- Species: C. sanchezi

Binomial name
- Centrolene sanchezi Ruíz-Carranza & Lynch, 1991

Synonyms
- Centrolene bacatum Wild, 1994; Centrolene guanacarum Ruiz-Carranza and Lynch, 1995

Species of frog

Centrolene sanchezi is a species of frog in the family Centrolenidae. It is found in the Andes mountains in Colombia and Ecuador. Its natural habitats are subtropical or tropical moist montane forests and rivers.

== Description ==
Males measure 19–22 mm (0.75–0.87 in) and one female 21 mm (0.83 in) in snout–vent length. Dorsum is dark green with shagreen skin with spinules and white warts. Iris is pale bronze with black reticulation.

== Reproduction ==
Males call from the upper side of leaves at night above streams. The call is a series of four to five high-pitched clicks, increasing in volume with the clicks and lasting about one second. Eggs are laid on the upper side, or more often, underside side of leaves, a few meters above the stream. There is no guarding of the eggs.

== Habitat and conservation ==
The species' natural habitats are montane primary forests, and to a lesser extent, secondary forests. Reproduction takes place along streams.

It occurs at the Yanayacu Biological Station, a protected area. Its habitat is threatened by agricultural development, logging, and human settlement.
