= Centrolene altitudinalis =

Conservation status
- Endangered (IUCN 3.1)

Scientific classification
- Kingdom: Animalia
- Phylum: Chordata
- Class: Amphibia
- Order: Anura
- Family: Centrolenidae
- Genus: Centrolene
- Species: C. altitudinalis

Binomial name
- Centrolene altitudinalis (Rivero, 1968)

Synonyms
- Centrolene altitudinale

Species of frog

Centrolene altitudinalis is a species of frog in the family Centrolenidae. It is endemic to Venezuela. Its natural habitats are subtropical or tropical moist montane forests and rivers. It is listed as Endangered by the IUCN.
