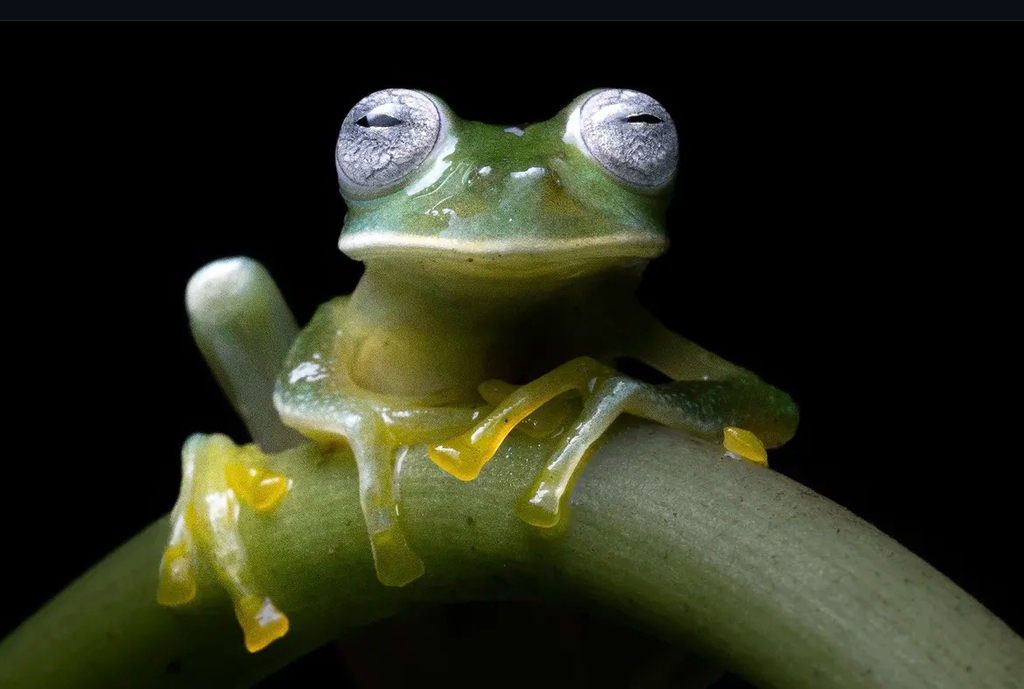

Conservation status
- Least Concern (IUCN 3.1)

Scientific classification
- Kingdom: Animalia
- Phylum: Chordata
- Class: Amphibia
- Order: Anura
- Family: Centrolenidae
- Genus: Nymphargus
- Species: N. posadae

Binomial name
- Nymphargus posadae (Ruíz-Carranza & Lynch, 1995)

Synonyms
- Cochranella posadae Ruíz-Carranza & Lynch, 1995

= Nymphargus posadae =

Species of frog

Nymphargus posadae is a species of frog in the family Centrolenidae, formerly placed in Cochranella. It inhabits the eastern slopes of the Andes of Colombia, Ecuador, and northeastern Peru. It is reasonably common in Colombia but rare in Ecuador.

== Description ==
Male Nymphargus posadae grow to a snout–vent length of 31–34 mm (1.2–1.3 in) and females to 30–33 mm (1.2–1.3 in). The dorsum is green with small greenish-white warts. Webbing is very reduced between the fingers and moderate between the toes.

== Habitat ==
The natural habitats of Nymphargus posadae are vegetation alongside streams in sub-Andean and Andean forests. They lay their eggs on leaves over-hanging water. When the eggs hatch, the tadpoles drop into the water below where they develop further. A permanent source of water is required for reproduction. This species is threatened by habitat loss caused by agricultural expansion, timber extraction, and water pollution.
