= Centrolene venezuelensis =

Conservation status
- Least Concern (IUCN 3.1)

Scientific classification
- Kingdom: Animalia
- Phylum: Chordata
- Class: Amphibia
- Order: Anura
- Family: Centrolenidae
- Genus: Centrolene
- Species: C. venezuelensis

Binomial name
- Centrolene venezuelensis (Rivero, 1968)

Synonyms
- Centrolenella buckleyi venezuelensis Rivero, 1968; Centrolene venezuelense

Species of frog

Centrolene venezuelensis is a species of frog in the family Centrolenidae. It is endemic to Venezuela and known from the Venezuelan Andes (between Táchira and Mérida states) and from the Serranía del Perijá, Zulia state. In Spanish it is known as ranita de cristal Venezolana or ranita verde de labio blanco.

Centrolene venezuelensis is a common species. Its natural habitats are montane cloud forests. It lives along running water, usually on overhanging vegetation. It is assumed to tolerate heavy habitat modification. It is not considered threatened by the IUCN.
