= Centrolene geckoidea =

Conservation status
- Critically Endangered (IUCN 3.1)

Scientific classification
- Kingdom: Animalia
- Phylum: Chordata
- Class: Amphibia
- Order: Anura
- Family: Centrolenidae
- Genus: Centrolene
- Species: C. geckoidea

Binomial name
- Centrolene geckoidea Jiménez de la Espada, 1872

Synonyms
- Centrolene geckoideum

Species of frog

Centrolene geckoidea is a species of frog in the family Centrolenidae. It is found in Colombia and Ecuador. Its natural habitats are subtropical or tropical moist montane forests and rivers. It is threatened by habitat loss.

Its common name is The Giant Pacific Glass Frog, and it is recognized by herpetologists as the largest species with the Centrolenidae family. Most Glass Frogs have a maximum size of an inch in length, but Centrolene geckoidea can reach 3 inches in length, making them three times the size of normal Glass Frogs.

Unlike other Glass Frogs, Pacific giant glass frog eyes are very small compared to its head; its legs are rather short and thick; its toes are well-webbed and have large toepads which are rectangular shaped instead of round. Pacific giant glass frogs are dark green to lime green in color, and their skin is covered with small bumps, or tubercles (TOO-ber-kulz), and small white specks. Their bones are also green. Besides being larger overall, males have stronger front legs than females; they also have bony spines, called humeral spines, that stick out of the upper part of their front arms.

While normal glass frogs lay eggs on quiet leaves overhanging calm streams, Centrolene geckoideum females lay their eggs directly on wet, vertical rock faces right in the splash zones of rushing waterfalls and rapid torrents. When the eggs hatch, the tadpoles drop straight into the violent, fast-moving rapids and to keep from being swept away, the tadpoles have evolved elongated, highly muscular bodies with low tail fins and specialized suction-like mouthparts. This allows them to anchor themselves to slick rocks and graze on algae while surviving the fierce current.

The cells in the skin of Centrolene geckoideum reflect near-infrared radiation at the exact same wavelength as the living tropical plants they sit on. While human eyes can't see infrared light, many of the frog's primary predators (like pit vipers and certain nocturnal birds) rely on it to hunt. This chemical trait allows the frog to hide from predators in plain sight.
