= "Centrolene" azulae =

Conservation status
- Data Deficient (IUCN 3.1)

Scientific classification
- Kingdom: Animalia
- Phylum: Chordata
- Class: Amphibia
- Order: Anura
- Family: Centrolenidae
- Genus: "Centrolene"
- Species: "C." azulae

Binomial name
- "Centrolene" azulae (Flores & McDiarmid, 1989)

Species of frog

"Centrolene" azulae, the Cordillera Azul giant glass frog, is a species of frog in the family Centrolenidae. It is threatened by habitat loss, and is included in the IUCN Red List.

Endemic to Peru, its natural habitats are subtropical or tropical moist montane forests and rivers. It was originally described in the genus Centrolenella, until 1993.
