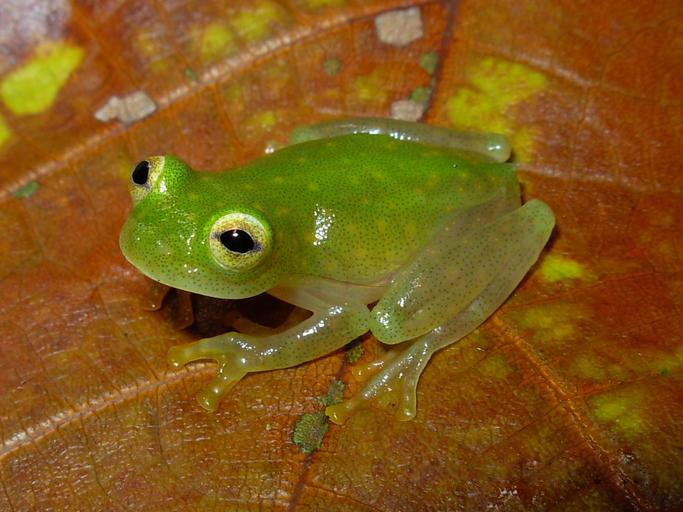
- Hyalinobatrachium fleischmanni

Scientific classification
- Kingdom: Animalia
- Phylum: Chordata
- Class: Amphibia
- Order: Anura
- Family: Centrolenidae
- Subfamily: Hyalinobatrachinae; Guayasamin, Castroviejo-Fisher, Trueb, Ayarzagüena, Rada, and Vilà, 2009

= Hyalinobatrachinae =

Subfamily of amphibians

Hyalinobatrachinae is a subfamily of glass frogs (family Centrolenidae) that was established in 2009. They are found in the Americas from Mexico south to southeastern Brazil and Argentina.

The subfamily contains 32 species in two genera:

- Celsiella Guayasamin, Castroviejo-Fisher, Trueb, Ayarzagüena, Rada, and Vilà, 2009 (2 species)
- Hyalinobatrachium Ruiz-Carranza and Lynch, 1991 (30 species)

AmphibiaWeb gives a slightly higher species count as it includes two additional Hyalinobatrachium species that are placed in synonymy in the Amphibian Species of the World.
