= Centrolene lemniscata =

Conservation status
- Data Deficient (IUCN 3.1)

Scientific classification
- Kingdom: Animalia
- Phylum: Chordata
- Class: Amphibia
- Order: Anura
- Family: Centrolenidae
- Genus: Centrolene
- Species: C. lemniscata

Binomial name
- Centrolene lemniscata Duellman & Schulte, 1993

Synonyms
- Centrolene lemniscatum

Species of frog

Centrolene lemniscata is a species of frog in the family Centrolenidae. It is endemic to Peru. Its natural habitats are subtropical or tropical moist montane forests and rivers. Its status is insufficiently known.

== Sources ==
- IUCN SSC Amphibian Specialist Group (2019). "Centrolene lemniscatum". IUCN Red List of Threatened Species. 2019 e.T54922A56579218. doi:10.2305/IUCN.UK.2019-1.RLTS.T54922A56579218.en.
