= Centrolene acanthidiocephalum =

Conservation status
- Data Deficient (IUCN 3.1)

Scientific classification
- Kingdom: Animalia
- Phylum: Chordata
- Class: Amphibia
- Order: Anura
- Family: Centrolenidae
- Genus: Centrolene
- Species: C. acanthidiocephalum

Binomial name
- Centrolene acanthidiocephalum (Ruíz-Carranza & Lynch, 1989)

Synonyms
- Centrolenella acanthidiocephala Ruiz-Carranza and Lynch, 1989

Species of frog

Centrolene acanthidiocephalum, commonly known as the Santander giant glass frog, is a species of frog in the family Centrolenidae. Its current placement within the subfamily Centroleninae is uncertain (incertae sedis). It is endemic to Colombia where it is only known from the region of the type locality on the western slope of the Cordillera Oriental in the Santander Department, at the elevations of 1,750–2,100 m (5,740–6,890 ft) asl.

Its natural habitats are cloud forests where it occurs on vegetation next to streams. Its conservation status is unable to be classified due to insufficient data.

== Description ==
After studies done between 2018 and 2019 discovered a few individuals of this rare species, the adult morphology of the specimen found were characterized as having minute cephalic spines, an arrangement of orange dots on the dorsum, small eyes, large body size, and well-developed humeral spines. The dorsal color of the specimen found was described in these studies as, "lemon green with few orange ocelli surrounded by a brown halo; pericardium white, visceral and hepatic peritonea translucent, and small beige-colored subcloacal warts." With this being said, due to the limited natural history observations no definite descriptions can be made, making this by no means a comprehensive morphological account of this species.
