= "Cochranella" ramirezi =

Conservation status
- Near Threatened (IUCN 3.1)

Scientific classification
- Kingdom: Animalia
- Phylum: Chordata
- Class: Amphibia
- Order: Anura
- Family: Centrolenidae
- Genus: "Cochranella"
- Species: "C." ramirezi

Binomial name
- "Cochranella" ramirezi Ruíz-Carranza & Lynch, 1991

Species of frog

"Cochranella" ramirezi is a species of frog in the family Centrolenidae. It is endemic to Colombia. Its natural habitats are subtropical or tropical moist lowland forests and rivers.
