= "Cochranella" geijskesi =

Conservation status
- Least Concern (IUCN 3.1)

Scientific classification
- Kingdom: Animalia
- Phylum: Chordata
- Class: Amphibia
- Order: Anura
- Family: Centrolenidae
- Genus: "Cochranella"
- Species: "C." geijskesi

Binomial name
- "Cochranella" geijskesi (Goin, 1966)

Species of frog

"Cochranella" geijskesi, also known as the Wilhelmina Cochran frog, is a species of frog in the family Centrolenidae. It is endemic to Suriname. Its natural habitats are subtropical or tropical moist lowland forests and rivers.
