= Cordillera de Cutucú =

Mountain range in Ecuador, part of the Andes

- Cordillera de Kutukú
- Location within Ecuador

Highest point
- Coordinates: 2°45′S 78°0′W

Geography
- Country: Ecuador
- Province: Morona Santiago

Geology
- Orogeny: Andean orogeny

The Cordillera de Cutucú is a mountain range in Ecuador. It is part of the Andes. It extends north and south, and is one of the discontinuous ranges and peaks parallel and to the east of the Cordillera Real or Cordillera Central, one of the Andes' two main chains through Ecuador. The Valley of the Upano River, a tributary of the Amazon, is to the west, between the Cordillera de Cutucú and Cordillera Real. The eastern slopes descend to the Amazon Basin. To the south the valley of the Santiago River separates the Cordillera de Cutucú from the Cordillera del Cóndor.

The range is covered in montane rain forest.
