= Universidad Nacional de la Amazonía Peruana =

Peruvian public university

National University of the Peruvian Amazon
- Universidad Nacional de la Amazonía Peruana
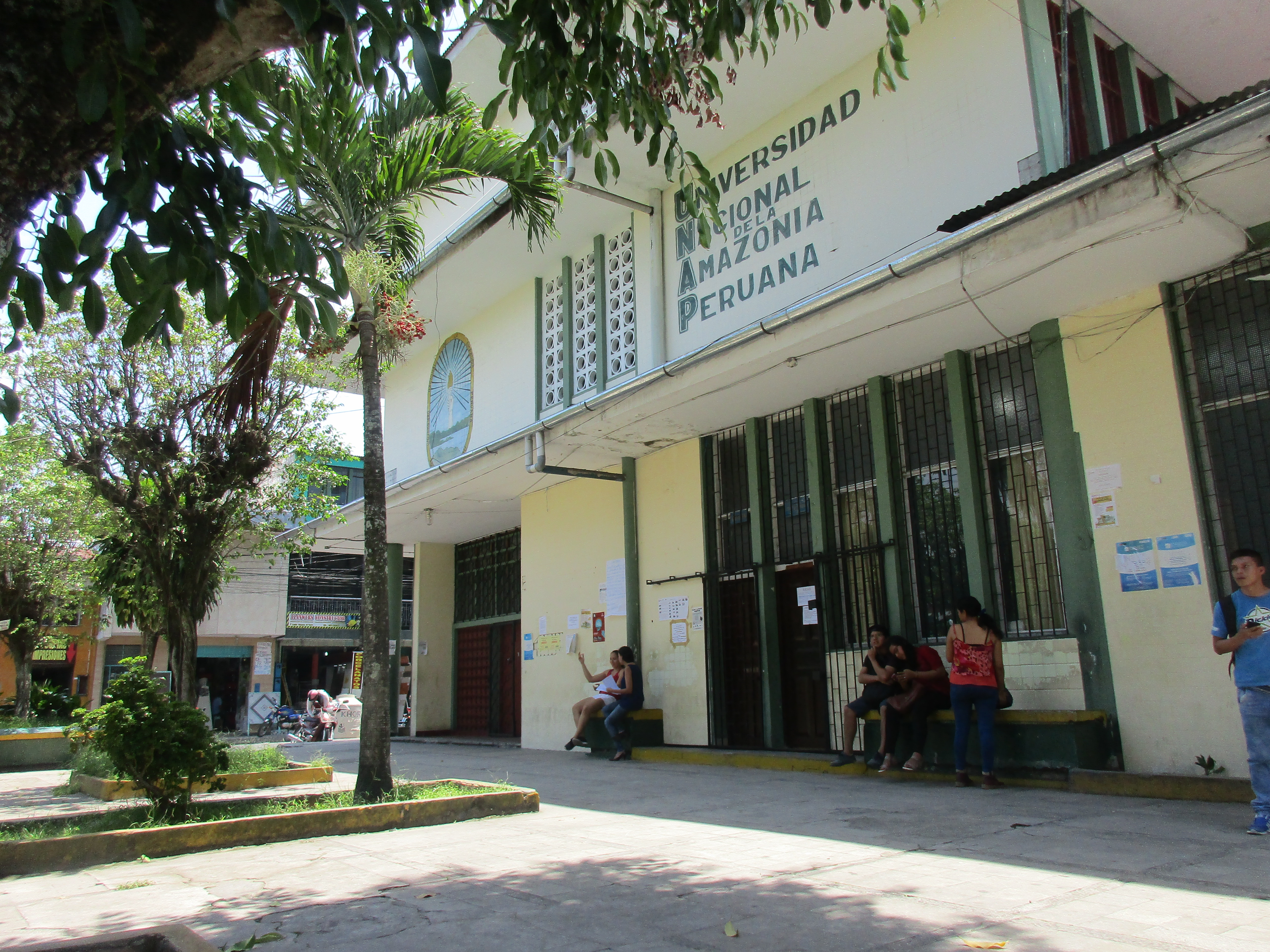
- National University of the Peruvian Amazon
- Type: Public university
- Established: January 14, 1961; 64 years ago
- Rector: Dr. Heiter Valderrama Freyre
- Address: Sargento Lores 385 Iquitos, Loreto, Peru 3°49′37.96″S 73°21′19.75″W
- Website: www.unapiquitos.edu.pe

The Universidad Nacional de la Amazonía Peruana (UNAP) was created on 14 January 1961 by Law 13498, given by the government of Peru's President Manuel Prado Ugarteche, responding to various needs that the Loreto community had, until then, making, a law order to have a higher education institution in Iquitos.

== History ==
In its beginnings, the university possessed a School of Chemical-Industrial Engineering, the School of Agronomy, the School of Mechanics and Electricity, and various technical institutes and training centers for workers. Besides, it provided for the operation of a Research Institute of Natural Resources and an Anthropological Institute.

To make the functioning of the newly created institution a reality, and following article 7 of Law 13498, the Board of Directors of the National University of the Peruvian Amazon was created, whose objective was to formulate the organization's plan, financing, and operation of the institution.

On 13 April 1962, the Preliminary Statute of UNAP was approved utilizing Supreme Decree 21, which consisted of seven titles and one hundred and eighteen articles.

The inaugural ceremony was held on 31 May 1962, in the Ramón Castilla Hall of the Maynas Provincial Council, which was chaired by Dr. Eduardo de Souza Peixoto H., president of the Board of Directors, and with the presence of the members of the Board of Trustees, the authorities of the town and the general public.

On 4 June 1962, the inauguration of the first academic year of UNAP took place, under the responsibility of Dr. Emilio Gordillo Angulo, director of the School of General Studies (basic cycle).

The first University Assembly was installed in 1964, in which it was agreed to change the name of "schools" to "faculties," conforming the following: Faculty of Chemical-Industrial Engineering, Faculty of Agronomy and Forestry, Faculty of Education, Faculty of Sciences and Humanities (the latter, trained biologists and physicists-mathematicians). In 1969, and by legal mandate, the faculties changed their denomination, becoming "academic programs," which were organized by academic departments. For almost fifteen years, the denomination of academic programs was in force until the University Law 23733, promulgated on 9 December 1983, restored the System of Faculties in the universities of the country, which is still in force today.

== Present ==
On 8 January 2018, UNAP received recognition from its local community during a ceremony for the 154th Anniversary of Iquitos. The recognition was presented by their towns mayor Adela Jiménez Mera.

== Studies ==
Undergraduate
Faculty of Agronomy	Agronomy; Engineering in Environmental Management
Faculty of Biological Sciences	Aquaculture; Biological Sciences
Faculty of Education Sciences and Humanities	Intercultural Bilingual Education; Physical education; Initial education; Primary education; Secondary Education; Mn: Chemistry biology; Mn: Social Sciences; Mn: Foreign languages; Mn: Language and Literature; Mn: Mathematics and Physics; Mn: Philosophy and Psychopedagogy
Faculty of Economics and Business Sciences	Administration; Accounting; Economy; International Business and Tourism
Faculty of Forest Sciences	Forest engineering; Engineer in Tropical Forest Ecology
Faculty of Law and Political Science	Law
Faculty of Nursing	Nursing
Faculty of Pharmacy and Biochemistry	Pharmacy and Biochemistry
Faculty of Food Industries	Bromatology and Human Nutrition
Faculty of Chemical Engineering	Chemical engineering
School of Systems and Information Engineering	Engineering of Systems and Computing
Faculty of Human Medicine	Medicine
Faculty of Dentistry	Odontology
Faculty of Zootechnics	Animal Husbandry
Masters
Master of Science with mention in Ecology and Sustainable Development; Master of Science in forestry with a mention in Forest Management; Master of Public Health; Master of Science with a mention in Sustainable Agrarian Development; Master of Audit; Master of Finance; Master's Degree in Public Management; Master's Degree in Business Management; Master's Degree in International Business; Master of Science with mention in Agribusiness; Master's Degree in Teaching and University Research; Master's Degree in Education with a mention in Educational Management; Master of Laws with mention in Criminal Sciences; Master of Laws with mention in Civil and Commercial Law; Master's Degree in Family and Community Health; Master of Science in Food Processes; Mn: Processing of Fruits and Vegetables; Mn: Hydrobiological Resources
Doctorates
Business Studies; Law; Education

== See also ==
- Education in Peru
- List of universities in Peru
