= Nuptial pad =

Secondary sex characteristic on some mature male frogs and salamanders

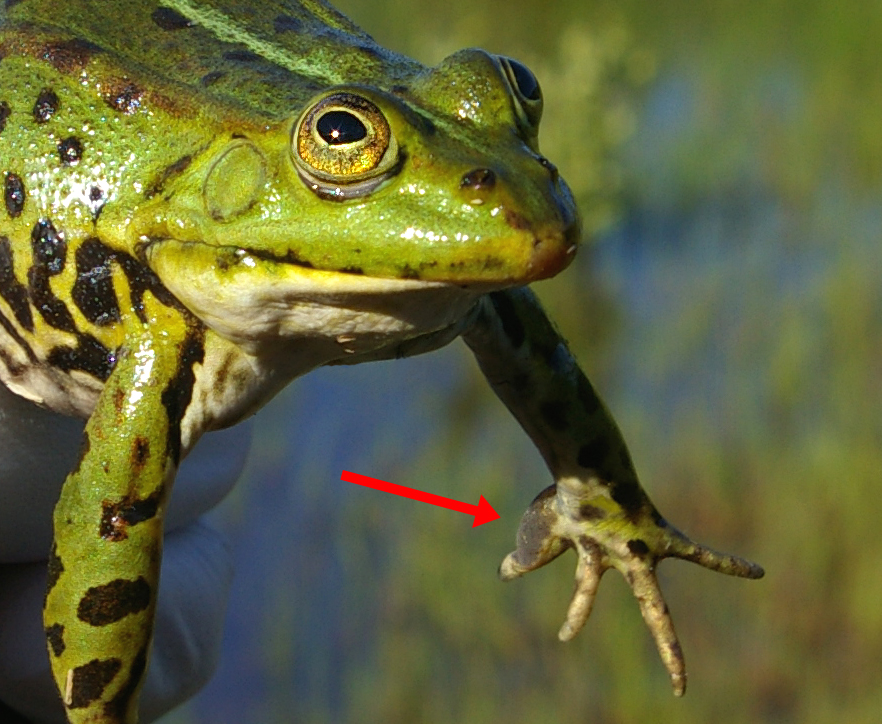
Nuptial pad (arrow) on thumb of Pelophylax esculentus

A nuptial pad (also known as thumb pad, or nuptial excrescence) is a secondary sex characteristic present on some mature male frogs and salamanders. Triggered by androgen hormones, this breeding gland (a type of mucous gland) appears as a spiked epithelial swelling on the forearm and prepollex that aids with grip, which is used primarily by males to grasp (or clasp) females during amplexus. They can also be used in male–male combat in some species.

== Historical background ==
Austrian biologist Paul Kammerer experimented on midwife toads' nuptial pads. He used the offspring's apparent enlargening from generation-to-generation as evidence of Lamarckian evolution.

== Examples ==
Many amphibian species manifest nuptial pads for use in amplexus, an example being the rough-skinned newt, Taricha granulosa.

== See also ==
- Amplexus – Type of mating behavior exhibited by some externally fertilizing species
- Humeral spine
