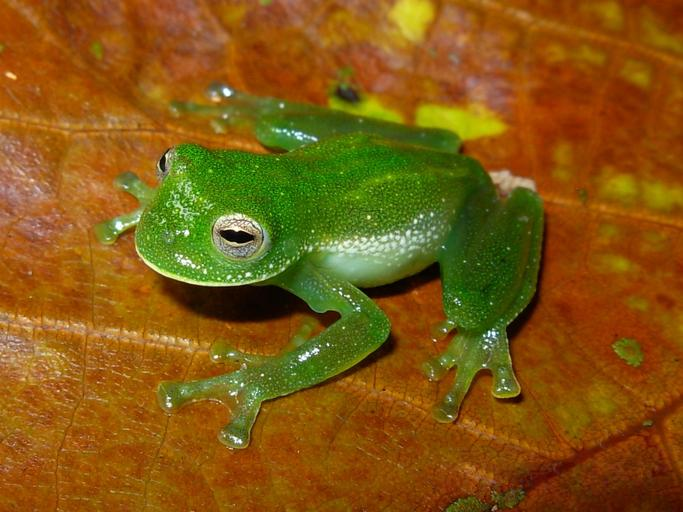
- Centrolene antioquiense

Scientific classification
- Kingdom: Animalia
- Phylum: Chordata
- Class: Amphibia
- Order: Anura
- Family: Centrolenidae
- Subfamily: Centroleninae
- Genus: Centrolene; Jiménez de la Espada, 1872

Type species
- Centrolene geckoidea Jiménez de la Espada, 1872

Species
- See text

Synonyms
- Centrolenella Noble, 1920

= Centrolene =

Genus of amphibians

Centrolene is a genus of glass frogs in the family Centrolenidae. The adult males are characterized by having a humeral spine, as most members of this family. The delimitation of this genus versus Cochranella is not fully resolved, and some species formerly in Centrolenella — which is nowadays synonymized with Centrolene — are now in Hyalinobatrachium.

The genus is known as "giant glass frogs", but this is merely relative to the rest of their family, which contains numerous extremely diminutive species.

== Species ==
The following species are recognised in the genus Centrolene:

- Centrolene acanthidiocephalum (Ruiz-Carranza and Lynch, 1989)
- Centrolene altitudinalis (Rivero, 1968)
- Centrolene antioquiensis (Noble, 1920)
- Centrolene azulae (Flores & McDiarmid, 1989)
- Centrolene ballux (Duellman and Burrowes, 1989)
- Centrolene buckleyi (Boulenger, 1882)
- Centrolene camposi Cisneros-Heredia et al., 2023
- Centrolene charapita Twomey, Delia, and Castroviejo-Fisher, 2014
- Centrolene condor Cisneros-Heredia and Morales-Mite, 2008
- Centrolene daidalea (Ruiz-Carranza and Lynch, 1991)
- Centrolene elisae Franco-Mena, Vega-Yánez, Reyes-Puig & Guayasamin, 2024
- Centrolene ericsmithi Cisneros-Heredia et al., 2023
- Centrolene geckoidea Jiménez de la Espada, 1872
- Centrolene heloderma (Duellman, 1981)
- Centrolene hesperia (Cadle and McDiarmid, 1990)
- Centrolene huilensis Ruiz-Carranza and Lynch, 1995
- Centrolene hybrida Ruiz-Carranza and Lynch, 1991
- Centrolene kutuku Ron et al., 2024
- Centrolene lemniscata Duellman and Schulte, 1993
- Centrolene lynchi (Duellman, 1980)
- Centrolene marcoreyesi Franco-Mena, Székely, Culebras, Batallas-Revelo, Pablo Reyes-Puig & Guayasamin, 2024
- Centrolene muelleri Duellman and Schulte, 1993
- Centrolene notosticta Ruiz-Carranza and Lynch, 1991
- Centrolene paezorum Ruiz-Carranza, Hernández-Camacho, and Ardila-Robayo, 1986
- Centrolene peristicta (Lynch and Duellman, 1973)
- Centrolene pipilata (Lynch and Duellman, 1973)
- Centrolene sabini Catenazzi, Von May, Lehr, Gagliardi-Urrutia, and Guayasamin, 2012
- Centrolene sanchezi Ruiz-Carranza and Lynch, 1991
- Centrolene savagei (Ruiz-Carranza and Lynch, 1991)
- Centrolene solitaria (Ruiz-Carranza and Lynch, 1991)
- Centrolene venezuelensis (Rivero, 1968)
- Centrolene zarza Székely et al., 2023
