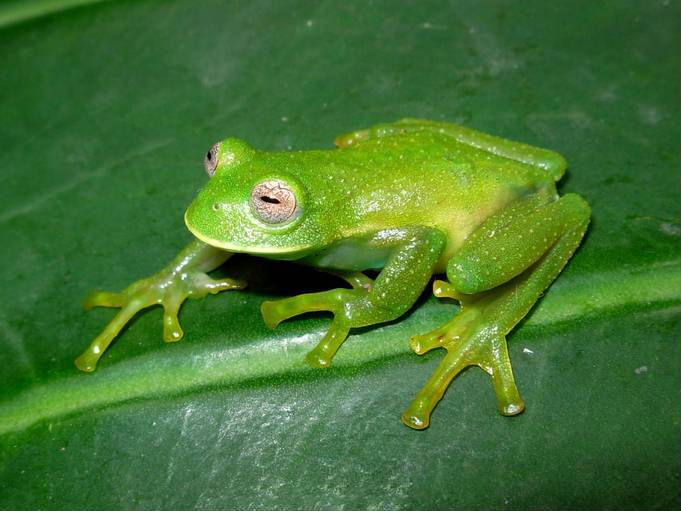

Conservation status
- Critically Endangered (IUCN 3.1)

Scientific classification
- Kingdom: Animalia
- Phylum: Chordata
- Class: Amphibia
- Order: Anura
- Family: Centrolenidae
- Genus: Centrolene
- Species: C. buckleyi

Binomial name
- Centrolene buckleyi (Boulenger, 1882)

Synonyms
- Centrolenella johnelsi Cochran & Goin, 1970

= Centrolene buckleyi =

Species of frog

Centrolene buckleyi is a species of frog in the family Centrolenidae. It is found in Colombia, Ecuador, and Peru. Its natural habitats are subtropical or tropical moist montane forests, subtropical or tropical high-altitude shrubland, subtropical or tropical high-altitude grassland, and rivers. It is a medium-sized glassfrog (males 26.5–30.9 mm; females 29.3–34.4 mm) with a uniform green dorsum, a white upper lip that usually continues as a white line across the flanks, and adult males have a large humeral spine; the anterior venter is opaque and the posterior portion is translucent. It is becoming rare due to habitat loss. It is named for the naturalist Samuel Botsford Buckley.
