= Humeral spine =

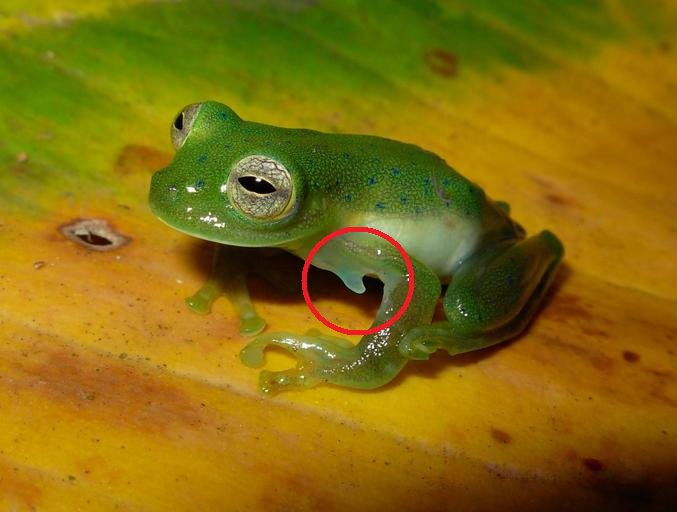
Humeral spine on Centrolene prosoblepon

Humeral spines are ventrolateral extensions of the humeral crista ventralis. These structures are present in the humerus of some frogs (anurans). The majority of anuran species that present humeral spines are glassfrogs (family Centrolenidae) but humeral spines have been reported in various other species of different families of frogs, including Leptodactylidae and Hylidae.

In all cases, humeral spines are present in males but not in females.

== Description ==
In Espadarana prosoblepon, height can range from 0.21 to 1.74 mm (0.0083 to 0.0685 in), and area from 0.009 to 0.10 mm^{2} (1.4×10^{−5} to 0.000155 sq in), correlating with body size.

== See also ==
- Nuptial pad
