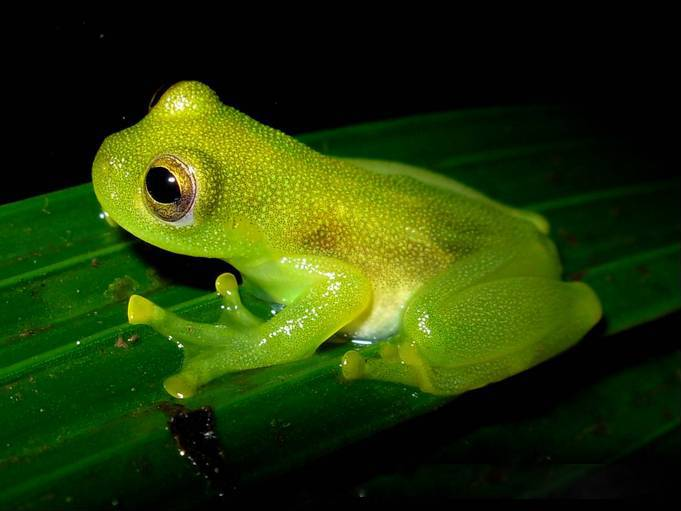
- Rulyrana susatamai

Scientific classification
- Kingdom: Animalia
- Phylum: Chordata
- Class: Amphibia
- Order: Anura
- Suborder: Neobatrachia
- Superfamily: Hyloidea
- Family: Centrolenidae; Taylor, 1951

Subfamilies
- Hyalinobatrachinae; Centroleninae
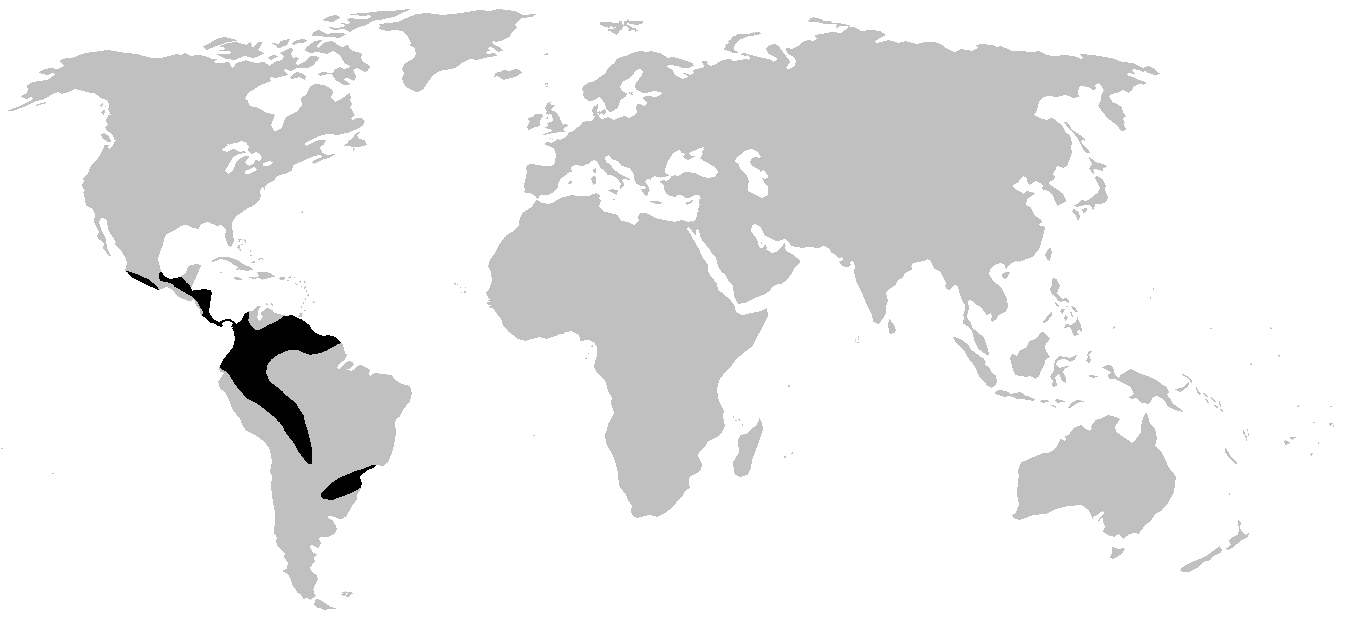
- Distribution of Centrolenidae (in black)

= Glass frog =

Family of amphibians

The glass frogs belong to the amphibian family Centrolenidae (order Anura), native to the Central American and Colombian rainforests. The general background coloration of most glass frogs is primarily lime green, while the abdominal skin of some members of this family is transparent and translucent, giving the glass frog its common name. The internal viscera, including the heart, liver, and gastrointestinal tract, are visible through the skin. When active, their blood makes them visible; when sleeping, most of the blood is concealed in the liver, hiding them. Glass frogs are arboreal, living mainly in trees, feeding on small insects and only coming out for mating season. Their transparency conceals them very effectively when sleeping on a green leaf, as they habitually do. However, climate change and habitat fragmentation have been threatening the survival rates of the family.

== Taxonomy ==
The first described species of the Centrolenidae was the "giant" Centrolene geckoideum, named by Marcos Jiménez de la Espada in 1872, based on a specimen collected in northeastern Ecuador. Several species were described in subsequent years by different herpetologists (including G. A. Boulenger, G. K. Noble, and E. H. Taylor), but usually placed together with the tree frogs in the genera Hylella or Hyla.

The family Centrolenidae was proposed by Edward H. Taylor in 1945. Between the 1950s and 1970s, most species of glass frogs were known from Central America, particularly from Costa Rica and Panama, where Taylor, Julia F., and Jay M. Savage extensively worked, and just a few species were known to occur in South America. In 1973, John D. Lynch and William E. Duellman published a large revision of the glass frogs from Ecuador, showing the species richness of the Centrolenidae was particularly concentrated in the Andes. Later contributions by authors such as Juan Rivero, Savage, Duellman, JLynch, Pedro Ruiz-Carranza, and José Ayarzagüena increased the number of described taxa, especially from Central America, Venezuela, Colombia, Ecuador, and Peru.

The evolutionary relationships, biogeography, and character evolution of the Centrolenidae were discussed by Guayasamin et al. (2008) Glass frogs originated in South America and dispersed multiple times into Central America. Characteristics evolution seems to be complex, with multiple gains and/or losses of humeral spines, reduced hand webbing, and complete ventral transparency. Researched by Santiago (2009), evolution and speciation on glass frogs has shown that ecological gradient and isolation have a role in speciation and divergence in glass frogs by comparing glass frogs Mitochondrial DNA. Glass frogs have expanded from the Guiana shield to other rainforests and diversified further. They evolved to be able to survive and fit in with their environments.

The taxonomical classification of the glass frogs has been problematic. In 1991, after a major revision of the species and taxonomic characteristics, herpetologists Pedro Ruiz-Carranza and John D. Lynch published a proposal for a taxonomic classification of the Centrolenidae based on cladistic principles and defining monophyletic groups. That paper was the first of a series of contributions dealing with the glass frogs from Colombia that led them to describe almost 50 species. The genus Centrolene was proposed to include the species with a humeral spine in adult males, and the genus Hyalinobatrachium was to include the species with a bulbous liver. However, they left a heterogeneous group of species in the genus Cochranella, defined just by lacking a humeral spine and a bulbous liver. Since the publication of the extensive revision of the Colombian glass frogs, several other publications have dealt with them from Venezuela, Costa Rica, and Ecuador.

In 2006, the genus Nymphargus was erected for the species with basal webbing among outer fingers (part of the previous Cochranella ocellata species group).

Four genera (Centrolene, Cochranella, Hyalinobatrachium, and Nymphargus) have been shown to be poly- or paraphyletic, and recently a new taxonomy has been proposed (see below).

== Classification ==
The family Centrolenidae is a clade of anurans. Previously, the family was considered closely related to the family Hylidae; however, recent phylogenetic studies have placed them (and their sister taxon, the family Allophrynidae) closer to the family Leptodactylidae.

The monophyly of the Centrolenidae is supported by morphological and behavioral characteristics, including the presence of a dilated process on the medial side of the third metacarpal (an apparently unique synapomorphy); a ventral origin of the musculus flexor teres digiti III relative to the m. transversi metacarpi I; terminal phalanges being T-shaped; exotroph, lotic, burrower/fossorial tadpoles with a vermiform body and dorsal C-shaped eyes that live buried within leaf packs in still or flowing water systems; and egg clutches deposited outside of water on vegetation or rocks above still or flowing water systems. Several molecular synapomorphies also support the monophyly of the clade.

The taxonomic classification of the Centrolenidae was recently modified. The family now contains two subfamilies and 12 genera.

== Subfamily Centroleninae ==
=== Genera ===
  - Centrolene Jiménez de la Espada, 1872
  - Chimerella Guayasamin, Castroviejo, Trueb, Ayarzagüena, Rada, Vilá, 2009
  - Cochranella Taylor, 1951
  - Espadarana Guayasamin, Castroviejo, Trueb, Ayarzagüena, Rada, Vilá, 2009
  - Nymphargus Cisneros-Heredia & McDiarmid, 2007
  - Rulyrana Guayasamin, Castroviejo, Trueb, Ayarzagüena, Rada, Vilá, 2009
  - Sachatamia Guayasamin, Castroviejo, Trueb, Ayarzagüena, Rada, Vilá, 2009
  - Teratohyla Taylor, 1951
  - Vitreorana Guayasamin, Castroviejo, Trueb, Ayarzagüena, Rada, Vilá, 2009
  - Incertae sedis
    - "Centrolene" acanthidiocephalum (Ruiz-Carranza and Lynch, 1989)
    - "Centrolene" azulae (Flores and McDiarmid, 1989)
    - "Centrolene" guanacarum Ruiz-Carranza and Lynch, 1995
    - "Centrolene" medemi (Cochran and Goin, 1970)
    - "Centrolene" petrophilum Ruiz-Carranza and Lynch, 1991
    - "Centrolene" quindianum Ruiz-Carranza and Lynch, 1995
    - "Centrolene" robledoi Ruiz-Carranza and Lynch, 1995
    - "Cochranella" duidaeana (Ayarzagüena, 1992)
    - "Cochranella" euhystrix (Cadle and McDiarmid, 1990)
    - "Cochranella" geijskesi (Goin, 1966)
    - "Cochranella" megista (Rivero, 1985)
    - "Cochranella" ramirezi Ruiz-Carranza and Lynch, 1991
    - "Cochranella" riveroi (Ayarzagüena, 1992)
    - "Cochranella" xanthocheridia Ruiz-Carranza and Lynch, 1995

== Subfamily Hyalinobatrachinae ==
=== Genera ===
  - Celsiella Guayasamin, Castroviejo, Trueb, Ayarzagüena, Rada, Vilá, 2009
  - Hyalinobatrachium Ruiz-Carranza & Lynch, 1991 – "true" glass frogs

== Subfamily incertae sedis ==
  - Ikakogi Guayasamin, Castroviejo, Trueb, Ayarzagüena, Rada, Vilá, 2009
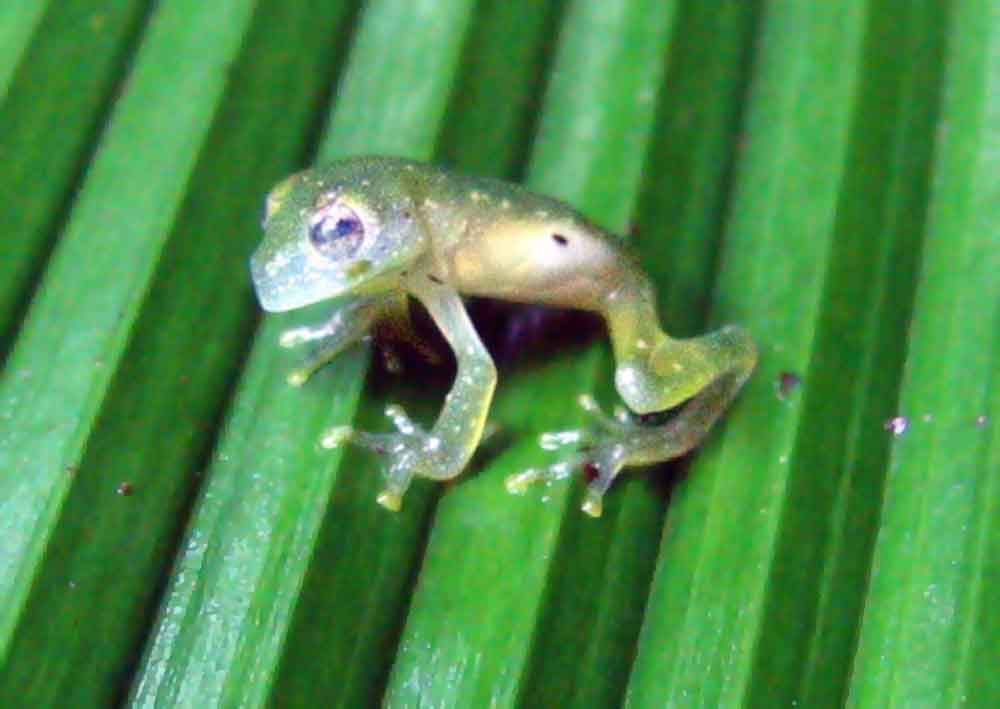
Cochranella albomaculata from Costa Rica

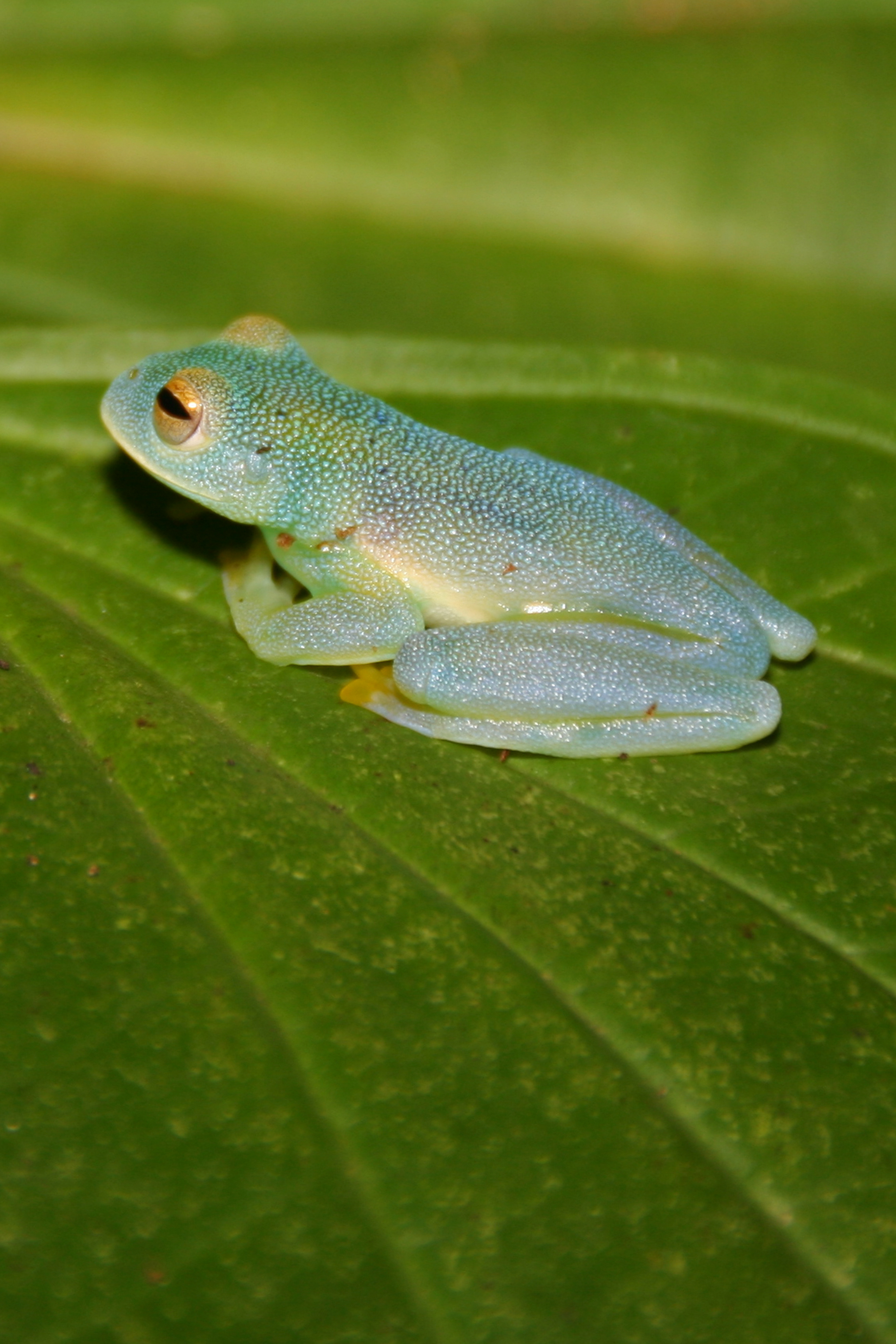
Cochranella granulosa from Costa Rica

== Camouflage ==
The evolutionary advantage of a partly clear skin and an opaque back was a mystery, as it did not seem to be effective as camouflage. The colour of the frog's body changes little against darker or lighter foliage, but the legs were more translucent and consequently changed in brightness. By resting with the translucent legs surrounding the body, the frog's edge appears softer, with less brightness gradient from the leaf to the legs and from the legs to the body, making the outline less noticeable. This camouflage phenomenon, in which the frog's edges are softened to match the relative brightness of its surroundings, is referred to as edge diffusion. Herpetology researchers study the pros and cons of transparency in glass frogs, the transparency was established to offer more than regular color changes in the skin itself through limited pigments. Experiments with computer-generated images and gelatine models of opaque and translucent frogs found that the translucent frogs were less visible and were attacked by birds significantly less often. Photographs of the frogs were taken both at night and during the day; results showed little to no visibility of the frogs on any leaves in the daytime or nighttime. It was found in 2022 that these frogs have the ability to conceal red blood cells concentrated inside their livers, increasing transparency when they are vulnerable. While this would cause massive clotting in most animals (including humans), glass frogs are able to regulate the location, density, and packing of red cells without clotting. The findings could advance medical understanding of dangerous blood clotting.

This camouflage characteristic on the frog leads many to think of the glass frog as cute

== Characteristics ==
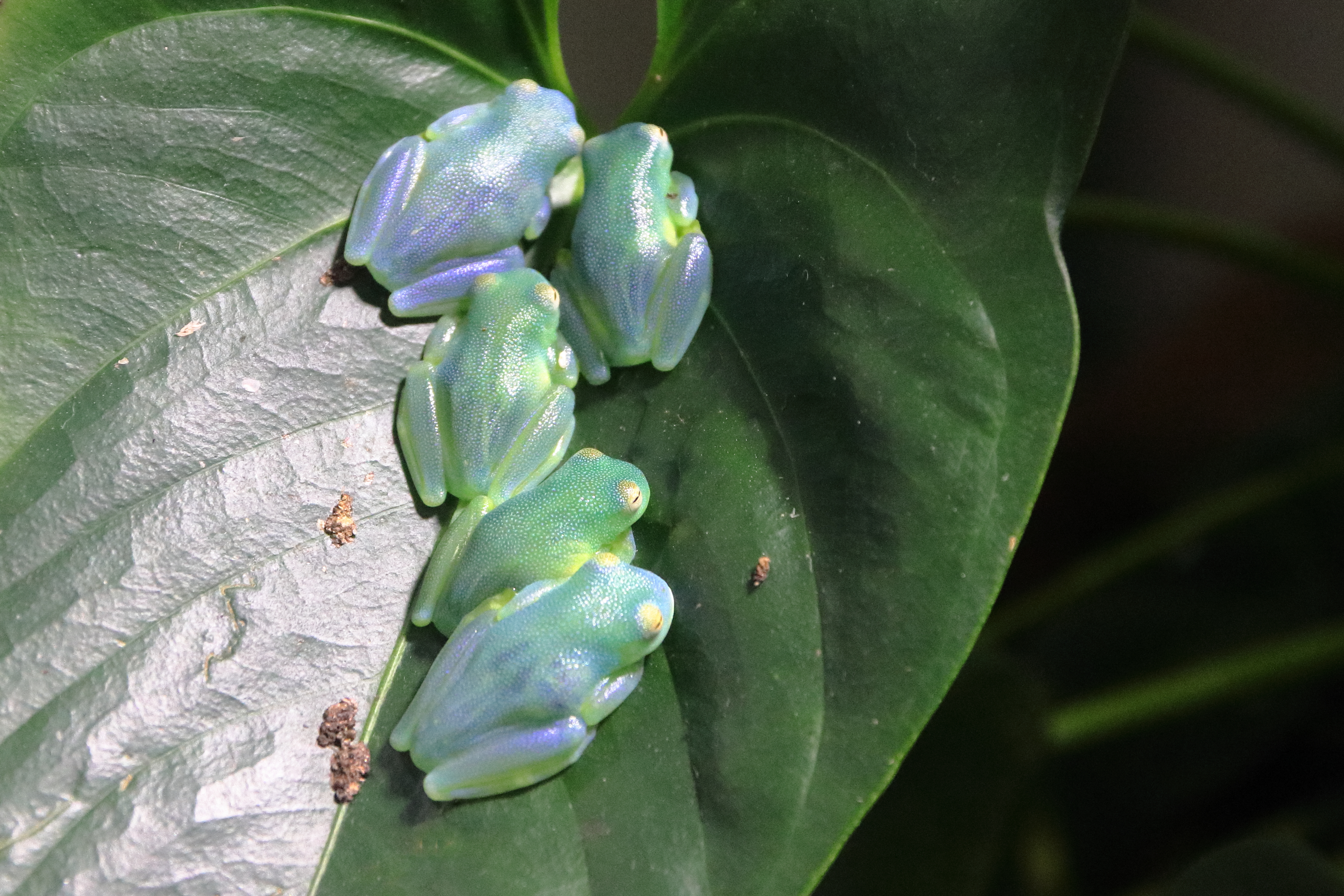
A group of glass frogs

Glass frogs are generally small, ranging from 3.0–7.5 cm (1.2–3.0 in) in length. They appear light green in color over most of their bodies, except for the skin along the lower surfaces of the body and legs, which are transparent or translucent. The glass frog's transparent skin allows an external view of the viscera—the internal organs present in the body's main cavity—allowing observers to see the frog's internal processes, such as the heart beating and pumping blood through its arteries. Patterning of glass frogs is varied between species; while some appear as a uniform green color, others display spots that range from yellow to white, mimicking the coloration of their eggs.

Their digit tips are expanded, allowing them to climb, thus allowing most to live in elevated areas along forest streams, such as trees and shrubs.

Glass frogs are similar in appearance to some green frogs of the genus Eleutherodactylus and to some tree frogs of the family Hylidae. However, hylid tree frogs have eyes that face to the side, whilst those of glass frogs face forward.

Two members of the Centrolenidae: Centrolenella fleischmanni, now called Hyalinobatrachium fleischmanni, and C. prosoblepon, and of the hylid subfamily Phyllomedusinae: Agalychnis moreletii and Pachymedusa dacnicolor, reflect near-infrared light (700 to 900 nanometers) when examined by infrared color photography. Infrared reflectance may confer adaptive advantage to these arboreal frogs both in thermoregulation and infrared cryptic coloration. An endangered species of glass frog found in Peru was compared to N. mixomaculatus, and these results were recorded: no humeral spine, no webbed fingers between II and III, finger I shorter than II, no vomerine teeth, no ulnar and tarsal tubercles or folds, no white pigment in the visceral or hepatic peritonea, and differing coloration and spots.

=== Lifecycle ===
The glass frog life cycle begins with a male and female mating on a leaf overhanging a stream, after which the female lays eggs and the male guards them. Once the leaf falls into the stream, the eggs hatch from 10 to 20 days, often during heavy rainfall. They then undergo metamorphosis in the water and on the stream's edge, eventually transforming into adult frogs that return to the terrestrial environment near streams.

=== Mating ===
Mating begins by the call of a male tree frog that is perched either on the underside or top of a leaf over a lake edge or a stream. Once a female has responded to the male's call, mating begins on the leaf in the amplexus physical position, in which the male wraps his arms around the female and attaches himself to her back. Once the physical mating process has concluded, the female produces her eggs onto the leaf before departing, leaving the male to defend the newly laid eggs against predators.

Centrolenid species show long-term parental care; males guard the clutch for various days after the eggs are laid. Environmental aspects also play into the amount of time the males tend to the young, such as rainfall or wind. Female postoviposition care is most often based on body conditions, whether or not she is able to fend for herself indicates how long after her eggs are laid that she will remain by the clutch. Males occasionally call for and mate with other females on the same leaf, establishing several different developmentally staged egg clutches to guard.

=== Tadpoles ===
Once the tadpoles, the frog aquatic larval stage, have been hatched, they fall from their original position on the leaf into the water below. When living in the water, the tadpoles feed on the leaf litter and streamside detritus until undergoing metamorphosis to become a froglet.

== Conservation ==
=== Predators ===
A main predator on the glass frog in its tadpole stage are "frog flies", which lay their eggs within the frog eggs; after hatching, the maggots feed on the embryos of the glass frogs.

Glass frog behaviors to avoid predation vary from species to species, as well as circumstances. Hyalinobatrachium iaspidiense was observed having a flattened body posture to avoid predation; after disturbing the frog, it propped up into a sitting position. Another male H. iaspidiense was observed protecting an egg clutch by extending all limbs and lifting his body from the leaf.

=== Habitat loss ===
In addition to predation, glass frog populations are experiencing declines due to habitat loss. Increasing deforestation in South America has reduced the natural habitat of the glass frog. Furthermore, deforestation may also result in alterations to local climate patterns. As a result, researchers have proposed that these frogs be classified as critically endangered rather than merely endangered.

=== Protection ===
All glass frogs are protected under the Convention on International Trade in Endangered Species (CITES) meaning that international trade (including in parts and derivatives) is regulated by the CITES permitting system.

== Distribution ==
The Centrolenidae are a diverse family, distributed from southern Mexico to Panama, and through the Andes from Venezuela and the island of Tobago to Bolivia, with some species in the Amazon and Orinoco River basins, the Guiana Shield region, southeastern Brazil, and northern Argentina.

The biggest threats they have are deforestation, invasive species, pollution, habitat loss and illegal pet trade. These many threats have led to a decline in the population of this species.

== Biology ==
Glass frogs are mostly arboreal, living along rivers and streams during the breeding season, and are particularly diverse in montane cloud forests of Central and South America, although some species occur also in Amazon and Chocóan rainforest and semideciduous forests.

Hyalinobatrachium valerioi glass frogs are carnivores, their diet mainly including small insects such as crickets, moths, flies, spiders, and other smaller frogs.

Their eggs are usually deposited on the leaves of trees or shrubs hanging over the running water of mountain streams, creeks, and small rivers. One species leaves its eggs over stones close to waterfalls. The method of egg-laying on the leaf varies between species. The males usually call from leaves close to their egg clutches. These eggs are less vulnerable to predators than those laid within water, but are affected by the parasitic maggots of some fly species. Some glass frogs show parental care; in many species, females brood their eggs during the night the eggs are fertilized, which improves the survival of the eggs, while in almost a third of species, males stay on guard for much longer periods. After they hatch, the tadpoles fall into the waters below. The tadpoles are elongated, with powerful tails and low fins, suited for fast-flowing water. Outside of the breeding season, some species live in the canopy.

Most amphibians use cutaneous respiration, or the process of breathing through the skin. Due to the importance of the skin, amphibians are very sensitive to what goes through their permeable skin, the stratum corneum, the main skin barrier, is much thinner than other classes such as mammals or birds. Chemicals and high levels of chemicals in water or rainfall may disturb frogs' health and possibly lives.
