= Hyalinobatrachium dianae =

Scientific classification
- Kingdom: Animalia
- Phylum: Chordata
- Class: Amphibia
- Order: Anura
- Family: Centrolenidae
- Genus: Hyalinobatrachium
- Species: H. dianae

Binomial name
- Hyalinobatrachium dianae Kubicki, Salazar, and Puschendorf, 2015

Species of amphibian

Hyalinobatrachium dianae, also known as Diane's bare-hearted glass frog or Kermit frog, is a species of Costa Rican glass frog in the family Centrolenidae.

== Description ==
Hyalinobatrachium dianae is lime-green in color with transparent skin on its underside that allows one to view its internal organs. Its skin is uniformly colored without any noticeable light or dark variation. H. dianae has silvery-white irises with small dark spots. The species has bulging white eyes with horizontally-shaped black pupils that resemble those of the Muppet character Kermit the Frog. UPI remarked "Hyalinobatrachium dianae has the kind-hearted muppet's sad but lovable eyes and lanky limbs." H. dianae is roughly 2.5 centimetres (0.98 in) long and lives in rainforest foliage of Costa Rica. It is found at elevations of 400 to 800 metres (1,300 to 2,600 ft) in forest near the Caribbean coast. The known territory of the frog is mostly within protected conservation sites and thus the species is under minimal threat from human activity.

H. dianae is distinguishable from other members of Hyalinobatrachium by its granular skin texture, its uniform color, and its advertisement call. DNA testing confirmed that it was a unique species; it was 12% divergent from its nearest relative, Hyalinobatrachium chirripoi. The advertisement call consists of "a single tonal long metallic whistle-like note with a duration of 0.40–0.55 s ... and a dominant frequency of 3.35–3.44 kHz". The frog's discoverers postulated that the frog went undetected in previous surveys of Costa Rica because its call is more like an insect than a typical frog.

== Discovery ==
Hyalinobatrachium dianae was discovered in the Talamanca Mountains of Costa Rica, and described from six specimens collected in the area. The find was announced by researchers Brian Kubicki, Stanley Salazar, and Robert Puschendorf from the Costa Rican Amphibian Research Center in April 2015. It is the 14th species of glass frog known from Costa Rica, and 149th overall. Kubicki chose the specific name in honor of his mother, Janet Diane Kubicki.

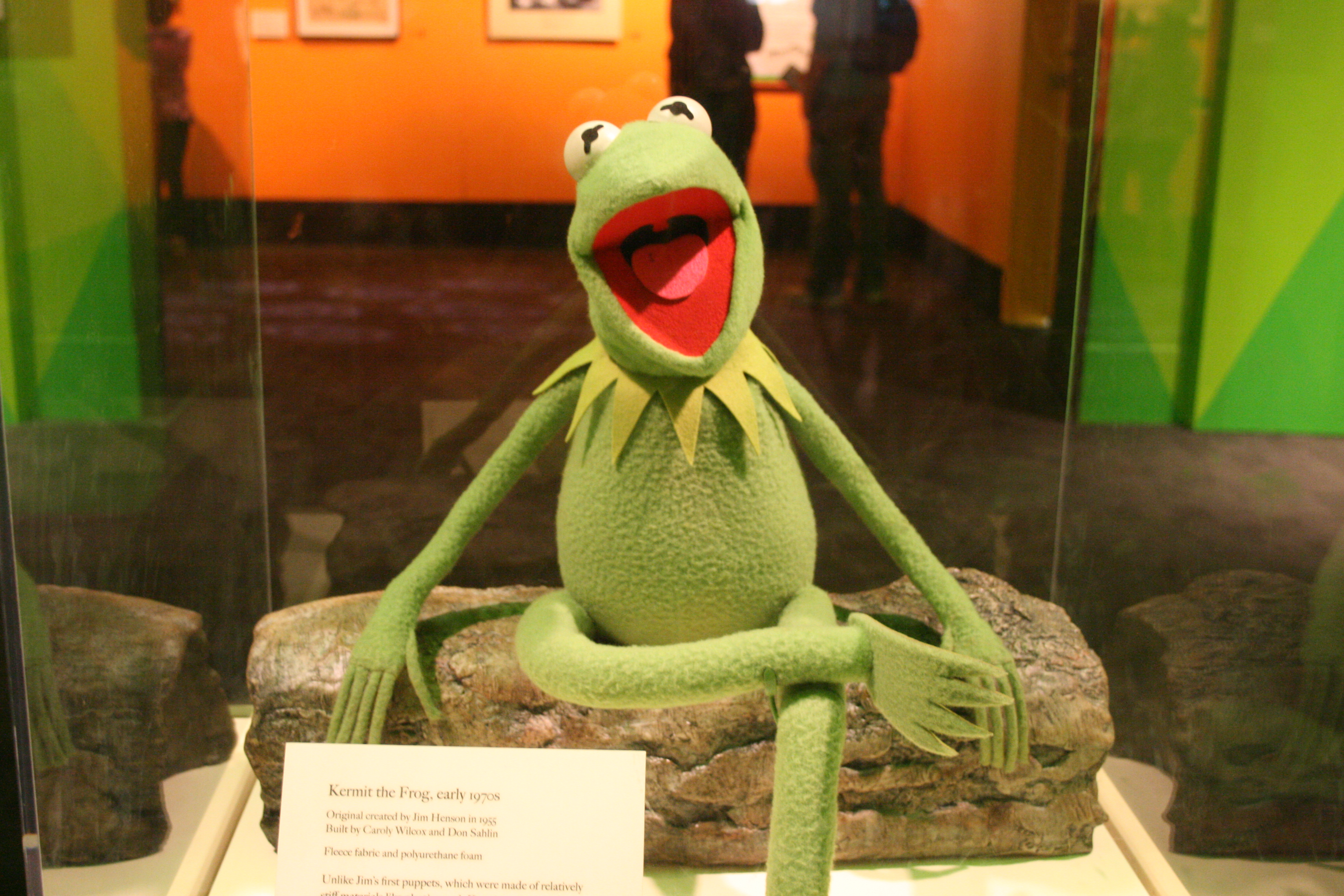
Kermit the Frog, from which the name "Kermit frog" is taken, due to similarities in appearance to the Muppet.

Due to the frog's resemblance to Kermit, the discovery attracted a substantial amount of attention in popular media. Tweets and news articles comparing H. dianae to Kermit helped images of the frog go viral. The attention prompted Disney to release an official interview where Kermit talked about H. dianae, saying, for example, "Googly eyes run in our family." Commenting on the attention, Kubicki said he was surprised because he had not noticed the resemblance himself, but was "glad" that it "ended up getting so much international attention" which drew attention to "the amazing amphibians that are native to Costa Rica and the need to continue exploring and studying the country's amazing tropical forests."
