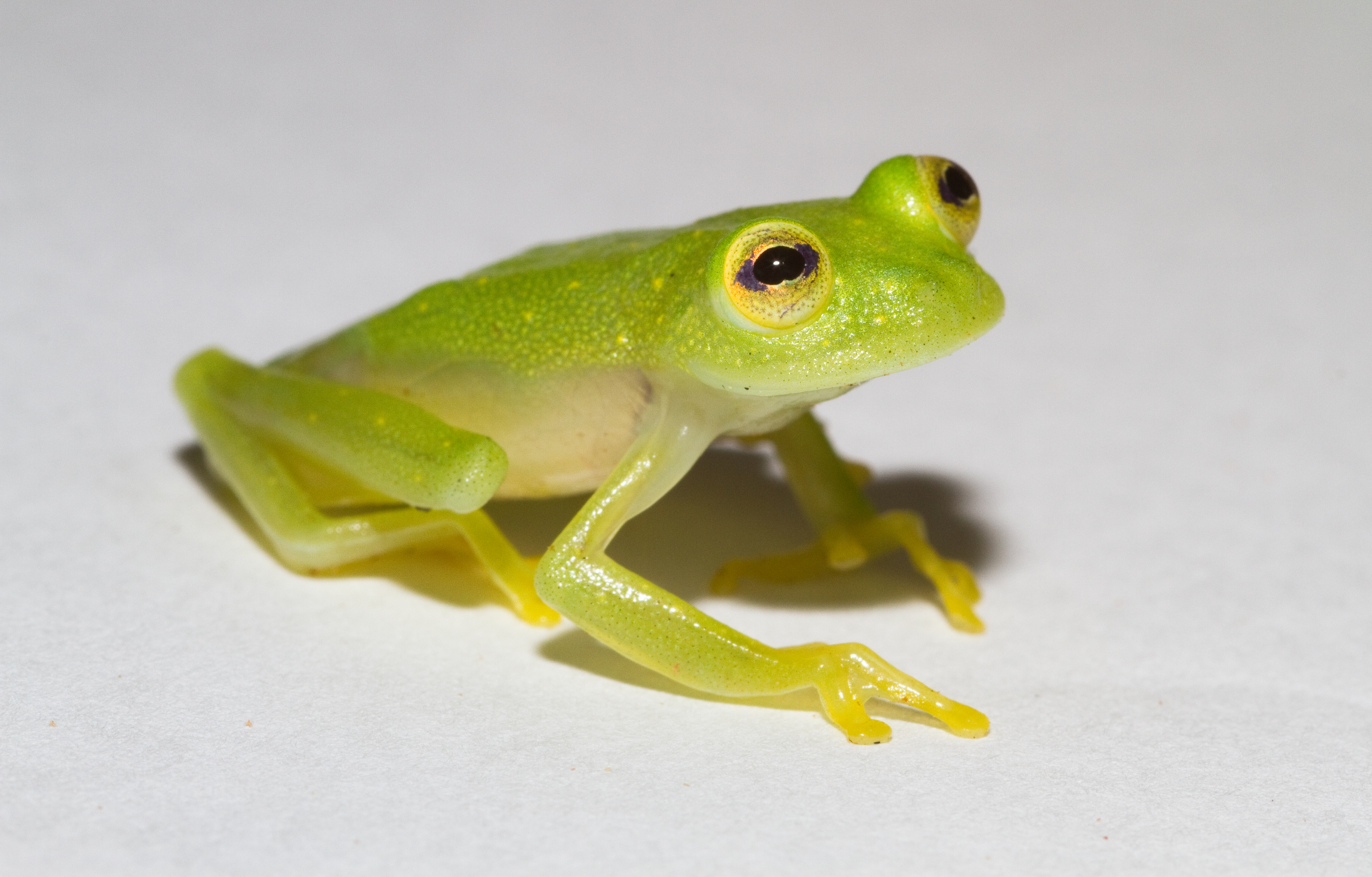

Conservation status
- Least Concern (IUCN 3.1)

Scientific classification
- Kingdom: Animalia
- Phylum: Chordata
- Class: Amphibia
- Order: Anura
- Family: Centrolenidae
- Genus: Hyalinobatrachium
- Species: H. vireovittatum

Binomial name
- Hyalinobatrachium vireovittatum (Starrett and Savage, 1973)

Synonyms
- Centrolenella vireovittata Starrett and Savage, 1973

= Hyalinobatrachium vireovittatum =

Starrett's glass frog

Species of amphibian

Hyalinobatrachium vireovittatum (common name: Starrett's glass frog) is a species of frog in the family Centrolenidae. It is found in scattered localities in Costa Rica and west-central Panama. It has, however, been suggested that most populations actually represent Hyalinobatrachium talamancae, with Hyalinobatrachium vireovittatum restricted to its type locality in the San Isidro de El General district.

Its natural habitats are humid montane forests where it can be seen in bushes and trees along forest streams. The tadpoles develop in these streams. It is threatened by habitat loss.

It was named after American herpetologist Priscilla Hollister Starrett.

== See also ==
- Starrett, Priscilla, and Jay M. Savage. "The systematic status and distribution of Costa Rican glass-frogs, genus Centrolenella (Family Centrolenidae), with description of a new species." Bulletin of the Southern California Academy of Sciences 72.2 (1973): 57–78.
