= Hyalinobatrachium nouns =

Scientific classification
- Kingdom: Animalia
- Phylum: Chordata
- Class: Amphibia
- Order: Anura
- Family: Centrolenidae
- Genus: Hyalinobatrachium
- Species: H. nouns

Binomial name
- Hyalinobatrachium nouns Guayasamin, Brunner, Valencia-Aguilar, Franco-Mena, Ringler, Armijos, Morochz, Bustamante, Maynard & Culebras, 2022
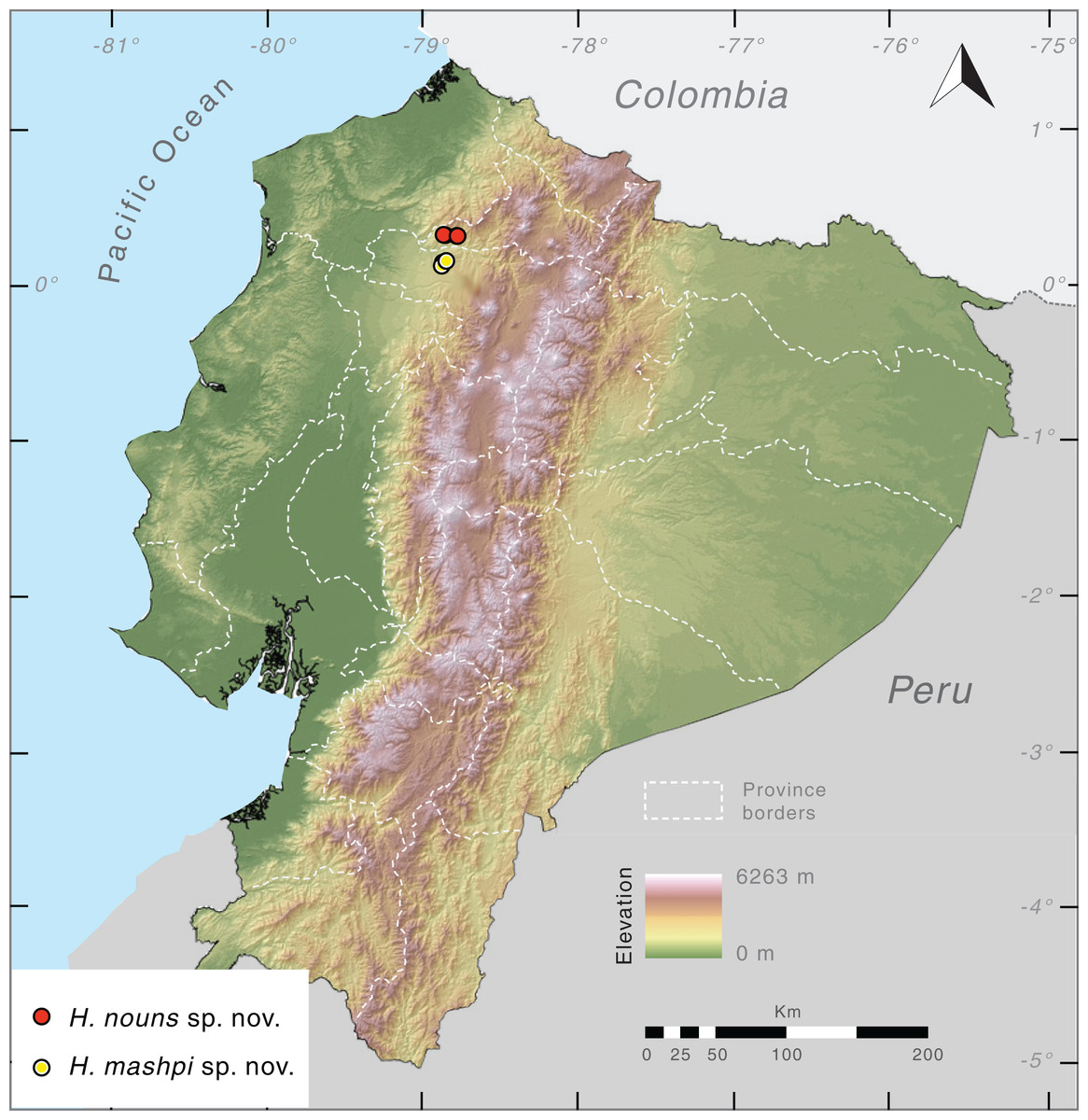
- Distribution of Hyalinobatrachium mashpi and H. nouns in Ecuador

Species of amphibian

Hyalinobatrachium nouns, also known as Nouns' glassfrog, is a species of glass frog in the family Centrolenidae, distributed in western Ecuador.

== Discovery ==
Hyalinobatrachium nouns was discovered (along with H. mashpi) in the Andes of Western Ecuador, one of the most biodiverse hotspots in the world. The discovery was published by a team of scientists, namely Guayasamin, Brunner, Valencia-Aguilar, Franco-Mena, Ringler, Medina Armijos, Morochz, Bustamante, Maynard and Culebras in early 2022.

This species has a light green color that resembles moss, with many small yellow dots around its head and back. Some body parts, such as the chest, pericardium, and stomach, are transparent, making many body organs visible through the skin.

== Naming controversy ==
The species was named after Nouns DAO, a decentralized autonomous organization, following a donation from the group to the environmental nonprofit Rainforest Trust, which runs conservation efforts in the amphibian's native habitat. This raised concerns among conservationists about associating the charity with a blockchain project.
