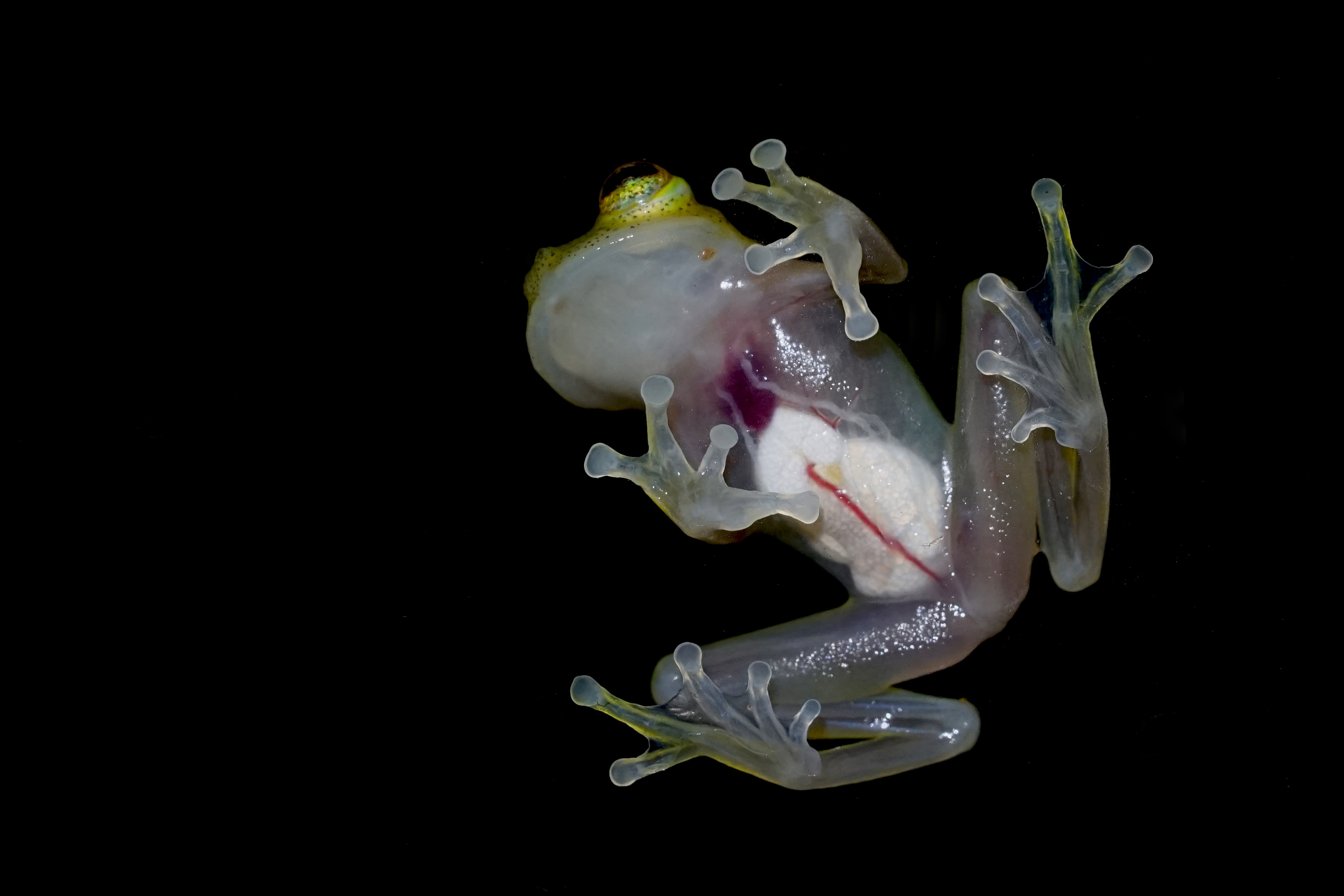

Scientific classification
- Domain: Eukaryota
- Kingdom: Animalia
- Phylum: Chordata
- Class: Amphibia
- Order: Anura
- Family: Centrolenidae
- Genus: Hyalinobatrachium
- Species: H. cappellei

Binomial name
- Hyalinobatrachium cappellei Van Lidth de Jeude, 1904

Synonyms
- Hylella cappellei Van Lidth de Jeude, 1904; Hyalinobatrachium crurifasciatum Myers and Donnelly, 1997; Hyalinobatrachium eccentricum Myers and Donnelly, 2001; Hyalinobatrachium ignioculus Noonan and Bonett, 2003

= Hyalinobatrachium cappellei =

Species of frog

Hyalinobatrachium cappellei is a species of frog in the family Centrolenidae. It is found in the Guianas (Venezuela, Guyana, French Guiana, Suriname) and in parts of the Amazon Basin in Brazil. It was until recently (2011) considered to be a synonym of Hyalinobatrachium fleischmanni.

Hyalinobatrachium cappellei are known for prolonged breeding and parental expression. Usually, the fitness and survival of offspring benefit at a loss to the parent. However, for this species, the males likelihood of mating increases with the number of clutches they attend (Vargas-Salinas, 2014).

A close species is called Hyalinobatrachium fleischmanni.
