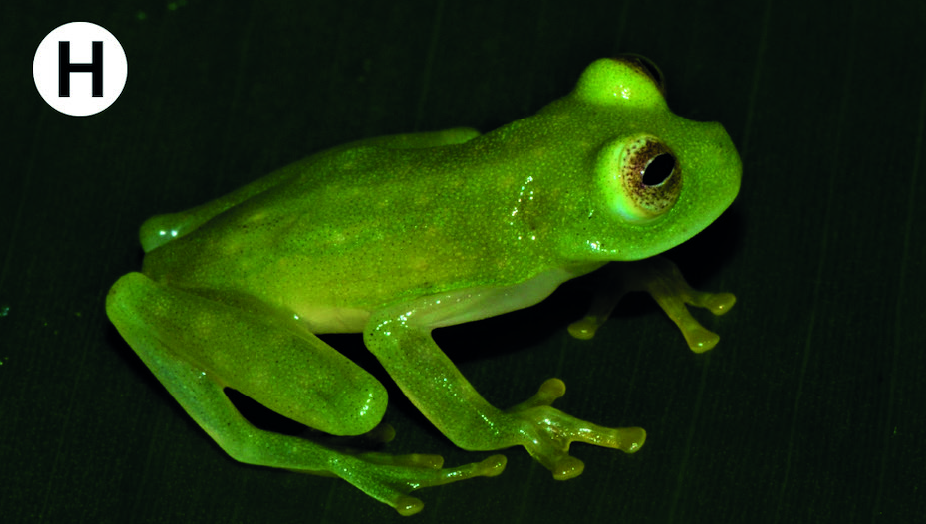
- Amapá, Brazil

Scientific classification
- Kingdom: Animalia
- Phylum: Chordata
- Class: Amphibia
- Order: Anura
- Family: Centrolenidae
- Genus: Hyalinobatrachium
- Species: H. mondolfii

Binomial name
- Hyalinobatrachium mondolfii Señaris and Ayarzagüena, 2001

= Hyalinobatrachium mondolfii =

Species of frog

Hyalinobatrachium mondolfii is a species of frog in the family Centrolenidae from northern South America.

== Distribution ==
Its distribution is poorly known but has two main areas: western Amazonian basin in Leticia in southeastern Colombia, Acre in western Brazil, and Pando Department in northern Bolivia, and the Guiana Shield region in Pará in northern Brazil, southern Suriname, Guyana, and Delta Amacuro and Monagas states in northeastern Venezuela. It is very similar to Hyalinobatrachium munozorum and Hyalinobatrachium ruedai, and it may be impossible to distinguish these species on the basis of morphological characteristics alone.

== Description ==
Hyalinobatrachium mondolfii has snout that is rounded in dorsal and lateral view. The tympanumic membrane is not visible. The belly and parietal peritoneum are transparent, whereas pericardium is white with minute melanophores. The dorsum is green with small yellow dots and minute melanophores. The iris is golden and reticulated by dark spots. The hands and feet are yellow.

== Habitat ==
Hyalinobatrachium mondolfii is exclusively associated with riverbank vegetation.
