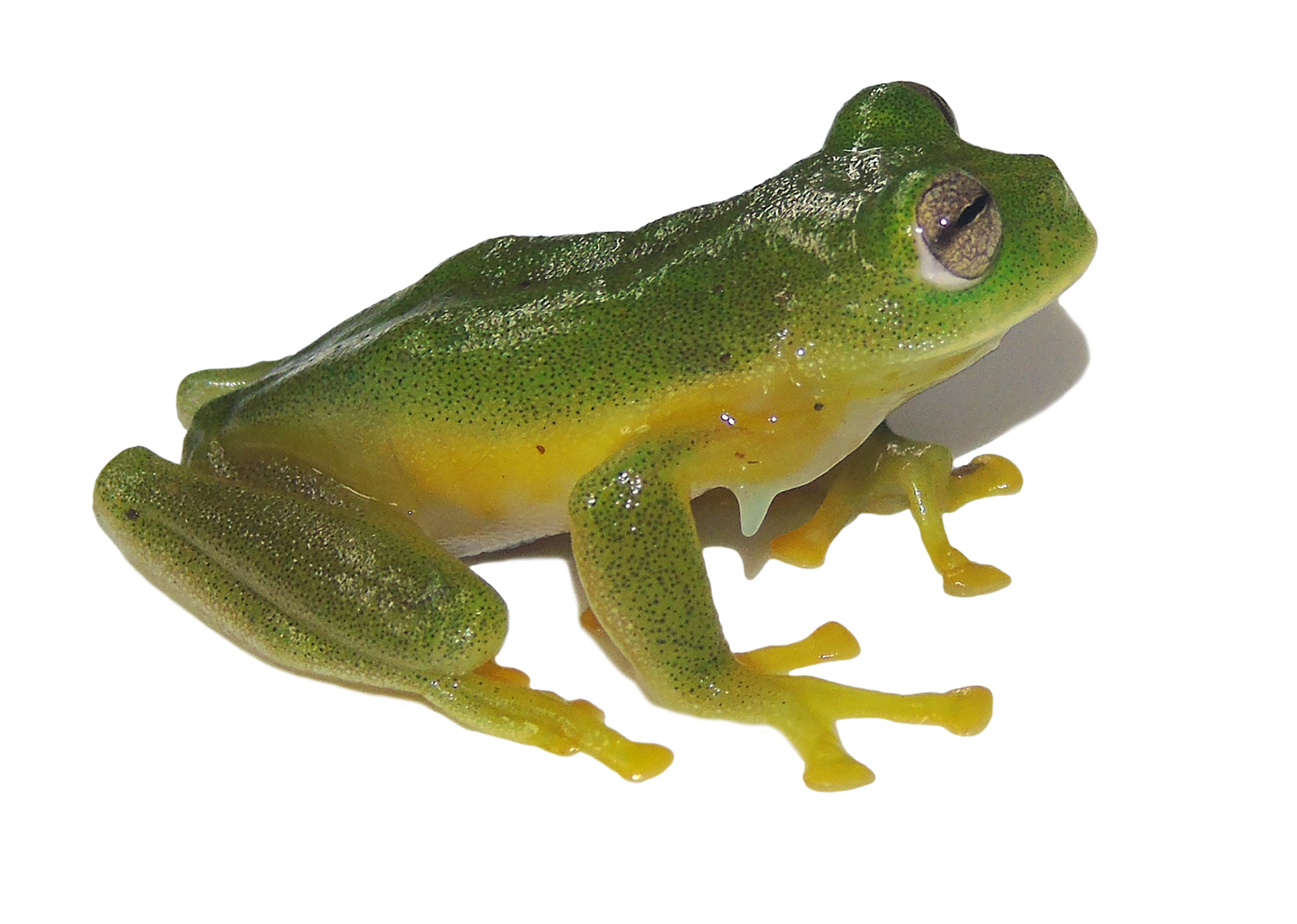
- An adult male

Scientific classification
- Kingdom: Animalia
- Phylum: Chordata
- Class: Amphibia
- Order: Anura
- Family: Centrolenidae
- Genus: Ikakogi
- Species: I. ispacue

Binomial name
- Ikakogi ispacue Rada, Dias, Peréz-González, Anganoy-Criollo, Rueda-Solano, Pinto-E., Mejía Quintero, Vargas-Salinas & Grant, 2019
- Place where the holotype was found in Colombia

= Ikakogi ispacue =

Species of frog

Ikakogi ispacue is a species of amphibian in the Centrolenidae family, which can only be found in the northern Sierra Nevada de Santa Marta, in the department of Guajira, Colombia. It inhabits subtropical forests and is usually seen over vegetation and near streams.

Adult males measure between 28.7 and 30.2 millimeters, and females between 29.5 and 30.6 millimeters. Their back is green and dotted with small black dots, while half of their belly is transparent and the other half is cream. They have a small line of white dots on the side of the body. Their eyes are large and dorsal, their snout is rounded, and their tympanum is not visible. They are morphologically identical to the Ikakogi tayrona, and can only be distinguished by genetic or bioacoustic analysis, or by the internal morphology of their tadpoles.

During the reproductive period, the males vocalize to attract the females, who accept the call and lay between 48 and 62 eggs in a gelatinous mass adhered to the leaves of the riparian vegetation. They are watched by the mothers until they hatch, which gives rise to tadpoles that live in puddles along the banks of streams. It is assumed that they may show fossorial behavior.

The first observation of the species occurred in 2015, when some researchers were conducting field work and found an individual that they imagined to be an I. tayrona, but with a different vocalization. Then, from that, new expeditions were made for a few years to study them and came to the conclusion that it was a new species, with the description being published in 2019 in the scientific journal PLOS One.

== Taxonomy, history and etymology ==
The first description of the species was made on May 8, 2019, in the scientific journal PLOS One, by a group of nine Brazilian and Colombian researchers: Marco Rada, Pedro Henrique Dos Santos Dias, José Luis Pérez-Gonzalez, Marvin Anganoy-Criollo, Luis Alberto Rueda-Solano, María Alejandra Pinto-E, Lilia Mejía Quintero, Fernando Vargas-Salinas, and Taran Grant. It could be identified as belonging to the genus Ikakogi from morphological analysis, where it was observed: the white coloration of its bones, the transparency of the visceral and hepatic peritoneum and of the ventral anterior part of the parietal, the existence of a ridge-like structure in the center and along the humerus and the presence of humeral spines in adult males, as well as behavioral analysis, and the existence of parental care on the part of females. To prove speciation, it was necessary to use other methods, since the adult individuals are morphologically identical to I. tayrona, such as phylogenetic analysis, where it was possible to find considerable differences in the genome sequence of cytochrome b of the two species, their vocalization, which is distinguished by the frequency and number of notes, and the internal morphology of their tadpoles, which have a different number of lingual papillae.

The first known sighting of the species occurred in 2015, when some of the authors of the description were on an expedition in search of frogs of the genus Atelopus and found an individual, which at first thought to be an I. tayrona, but with a different vocalization than expected. Subsequently, new expeditions were made in their search, with the holotype used for the study was found on October 1, 2016 in a small tributary of the Palomino River in the city of Dibulla, Colombia, at an altitude of 950 meters from sea level, and it was an adult male. In addition to this one, fourteen other individuals were collected at the same location, which were used as paratypes and were composed of males, females and tadpoles.

Its specific epithet derives from the Kogi language words tshi and spákue, which together mean twin of, an allusion to the fact that the species is morphologically similar to I. tayrona, the only other species in the genus Ikakogi, with which it has great phylogenetic proximity.

== Distribution ==
Currently, the species has only been observed in two locations, always near some tributary stream of a larger river and at an altitude ranging from 850 to 950 meters above sea level, in the Sierra Nevada de Santa Marta, in the cities of Riohacha and Dibulla, in the department of Guajira, Colombia. They inhabit subtropical forests and are usually found above the vegetation, at a height of one to two meters from the ground.

== Description ==
=== Adults ===
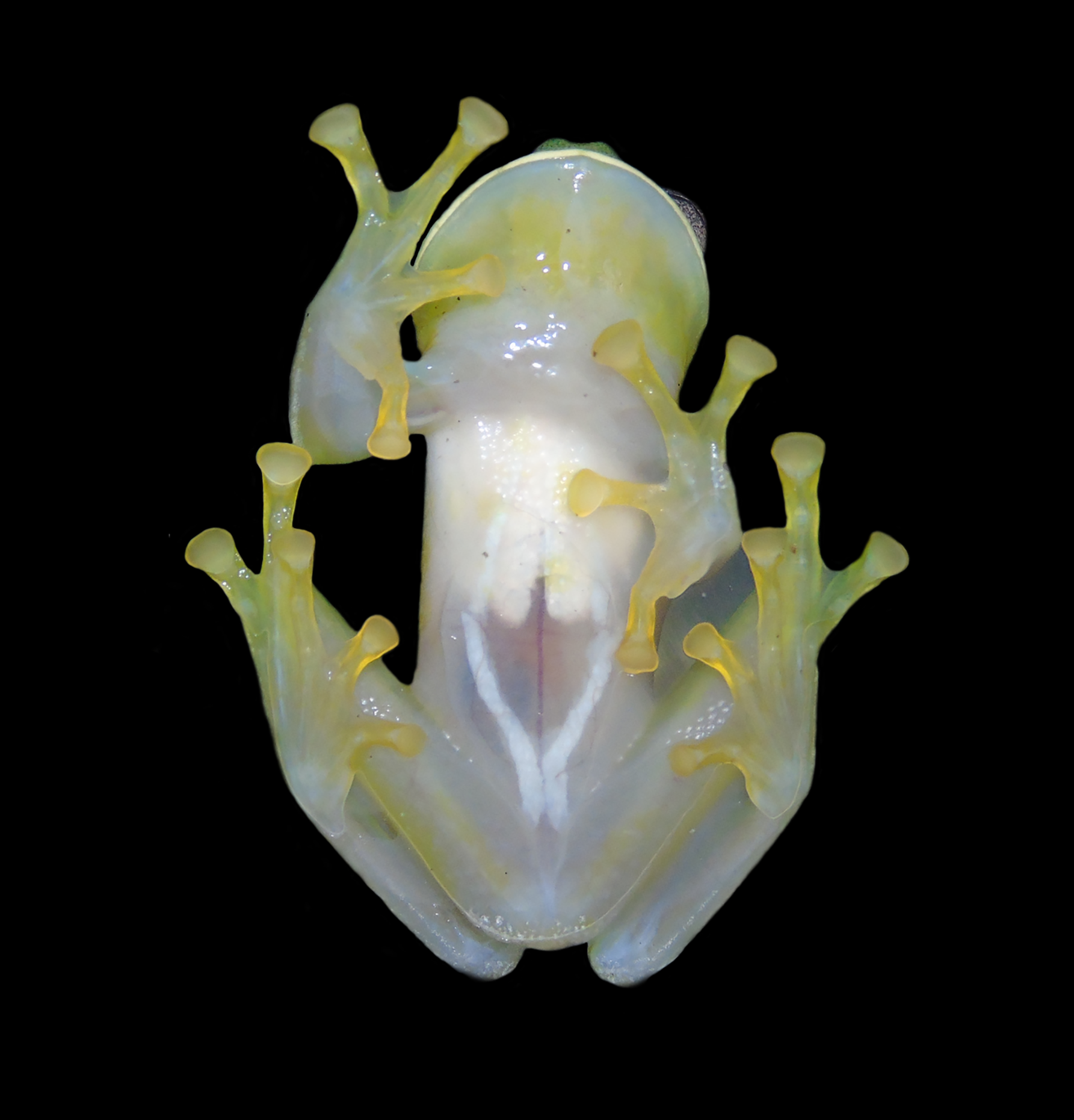
Ventral view of an adult male.

Adult males measure between 28.7 and 30.2 millimeters, while females measure between 29.5 and 30.6 millimeters. Their snout is rounded when viewed dorsally and slightly slanted or truncated when viewed laterally, their tympanum is not visible and their eyes are large and directed anterolaterally, at an angle of approximately 45 degrees. They have no vomerine teeth and their tongue is rounded and not fully attached to the lower part of the mouth. Its canthus rostralis is rounded, its nostrils are elevated, and its choana is medium-sized and oval. The texture of its skin is smooth on the back and granular on the belly, with the presence of a pair of large, rounded, flat tubercles on the lower thigh. Its parietal peritoneum corresponds to half of the ventral surface of its belly and is covered with iridophores, while its peritoneum, which corresponds to the other half, is transparent. Adult males have humeral spines. Its liver has four lobes.

Its back is green with tiny speckled black dots, while its belly is cream, whiter in the parietal peritoneum and translucent in the visceral peritoneum. Its fingers are yellow, and the upper edge of its mouth and the side of the body are creamy-yellow, with a tiny line of white glazed dots on the flanks. Its iris is golden and has small dark brown reticulations and a darker area towards the pupil. Its bones are white on the diaphysis and pale green on the epiphysis, probably due to the accumulation of biliverdin. When they are fixed, their color changes to cream or light lavender, leaving only a few white dots of the line they have on the side. Their iris also changes, becoming silver with black reticulations.

It is morphologically similar to the adult I. tayrona, being impossible to distinguish the two species just by visual observations, requiring genetic analysis, vocalization or tadpole analysis. But it can be differentiated from other members of the Centrolenidae family by the presence of a small white line on the side of the body and white bones, which is quite unusual, occurring only in some species of the genera Centrolene, Nymphargus, and Hyalinobatrachium, and that can be identified by the visibility of the tympanum (except in some populations of C. buckleyi and C. venezuelense), which in this species is not visible. Other features that together allow discernment are the shape of its snout, the presence of humeral spines, and its coloration when alive or fixed.

=== Tadpoles ===
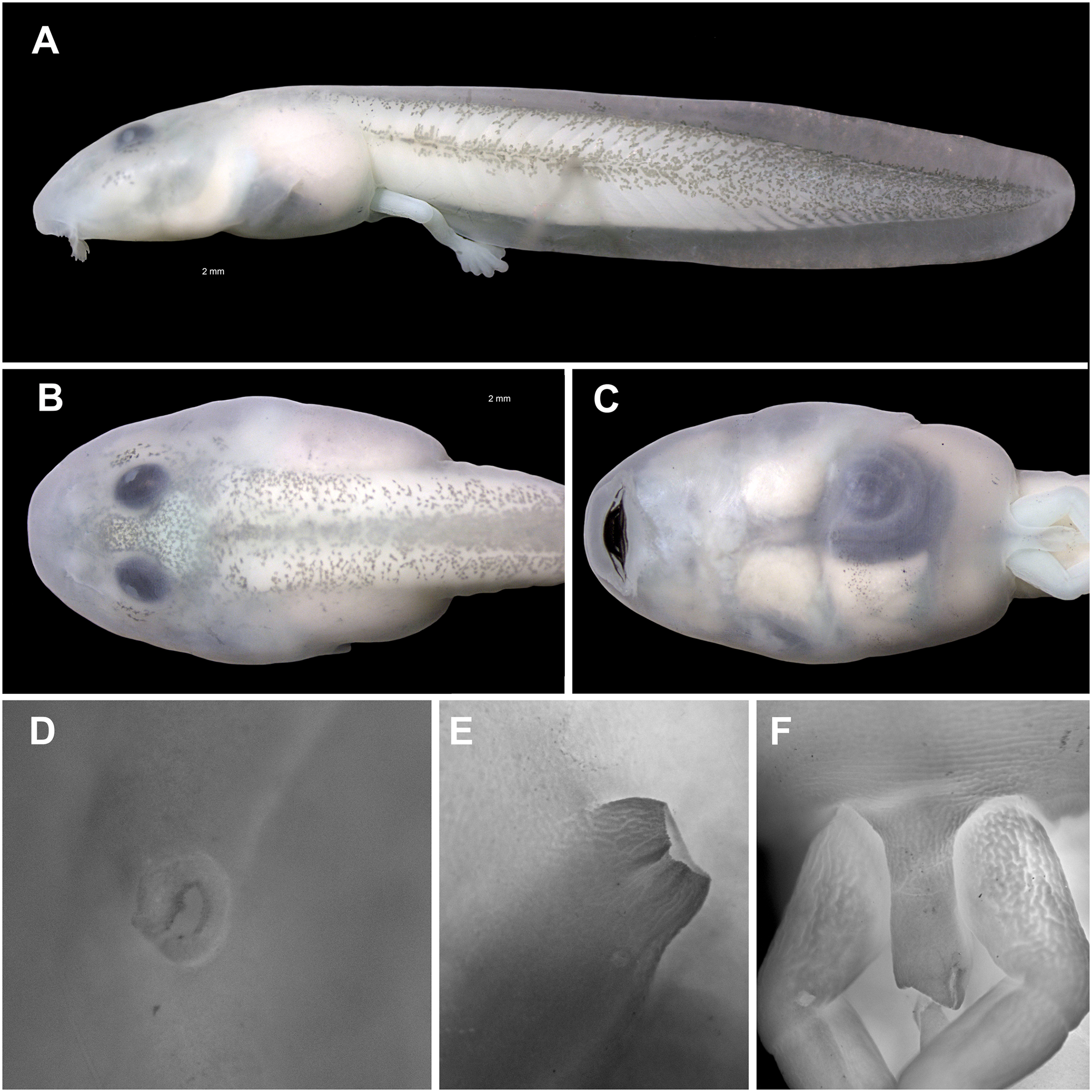
Lateral (A), dorsal (B) and ventral (C) views of the nostril (D), blowhole (E) and cloacal tube (F) of a fixed tadpole.

Tadpoles, when seen from a dorsal perspective, have an elongated and elliptical body shape, being wider in the central region and presenting a tapered snout, and when observed from the side, the body is turned downwards. The eyes are small, located on the back and directed anterodorsally, as well as the nostrils, which are reniform and have a marginal border and a fleshy triangular projection on the sagittal margin. Its mouth is anteroventral, has no lateral borders, and is surrounded by a single row with 64 alternate, conical marginal papillae; there are no submarginal papillae. Their labial tooth row formula (FFDL) is 2(2)/3. They have mandibular sheaths, which are serrated and keratinized, with the upper jaw being arch-shaped and wider than the lower jaw, which is U-shaped. Its blowhole is small and tubular and is located in the left posterolateral region. Its cloacal tube is also tubular and is centrally located at the ventral fin, being fused to it.

They have hypervascularized skin, making their coloration pinkish or reddish. Its back is lightly pigmented with a few dark gray dots, which are more concentrated on the back of the body, between the eyes and on the tail. Its belly is transparent, and it is possible to see its organs, such as its intestine, which is also transparent, its liver, which is dark red, and its heart and circulatory system, which are light red due to the passage of blood. The musculature of its tail is reddish and there is a brownish line through a third of it in the middle of the myotomes, and its caudal fins are transparent with a few melanophores. When fixed, its coloration becomes light cream, with the melanophores and tail becoming grayish.

They can only be distinguished from the tadpoles of I. tayrona by analyzing their internal morphology, where the number of lateral papillae on the mouth floor is counted, having thirteen in total, unlike this species that has ten. They can be differentiated from other species of the family by the absence of a striking coloration when attached, by the shape of the snout and jaws, by the FFDL and by the positioning of the blowhole.

== Reproduction ==
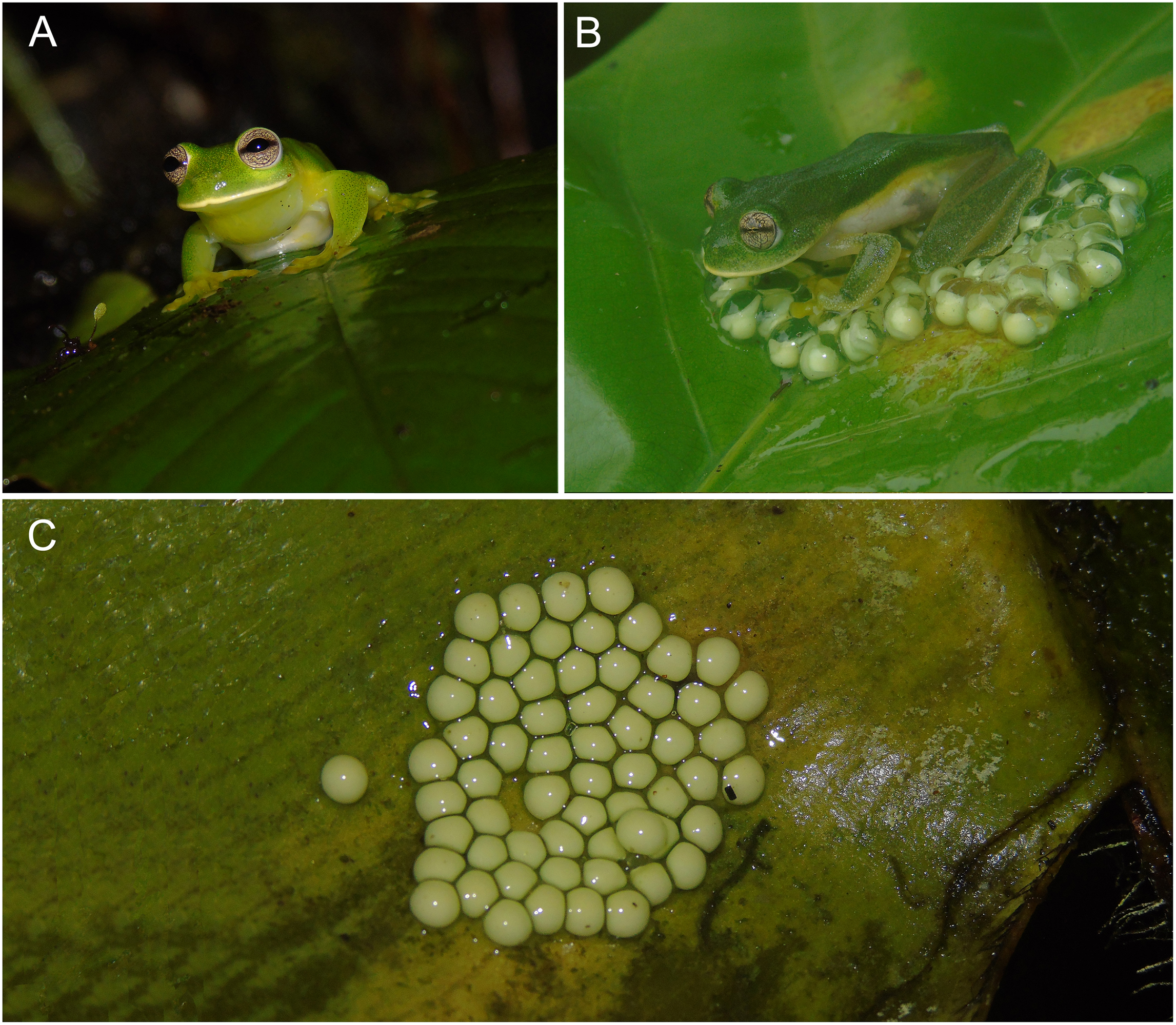
An adult male (A), a female with eggs (B) and an egg mass (C).

To attract females, the males vocalize on leaves of plants on the banks of streams, usually at a height of between fifty centimeters and 3.5 meters. Their vocalization is composed of the repetition of a shrill note composed of a set of eleven to twenty pulses with amplitude modulation. The duration of each note varies between 0.082 and 0.185 seconds, with the pulses lasting on average 0.007 seconds and with a short pause of less than 0.004 seconds between them. It is difficult to determine the frequency modulation, with the dominant ones being between 2,928 and 3,273 hertz, and there may be some notes at higher or lower frequencies. It can be differentiated from the vocalization of I. tayrona by the fact that the latter has three to four unpulsed notes, whose frequencies are lower, usually between 2 650 and 2 870 hertz.

After the female chooses the males, they perform the amplexus, and then she lays her eggs in a single gelatinous mass on plant leaves hanging down toward the stream. Each clutch contains between 48 and 62 eggs, which range in color from light cream to light green and are arranged in a ring shape. The developing embryos have cranial hypervascularization, making them pinkish or reddish in color. Their hearts are transparent, but due to blood circulation they take on a reddish tint. Their eggs, after hatching, give rise to tadpoles, which are usually found under sand or fallen leaves in puddles along the edge of the stream, with an area between one and two square meters and depth between thirty and fifty centimeters. Due to their morphological characteristics, it is thought that they may exhibit fossorial behavior.
