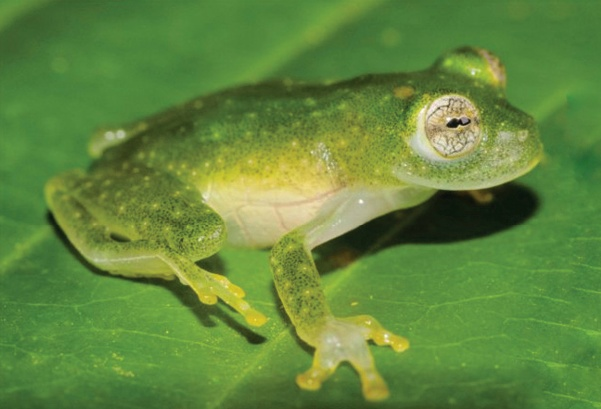

Conservation status
- Least Concern (IUCN 3.1)

Scientific classification
- Kingdom: Animalia
- Phylum: Chordata
- Class: Amphibia
- Order: Anura
- Family: Centrolenidae
- Genus: Hyalinobatrachium
- Species: H. taylori

Binomial name
- Hyalinobatrachium taylori (Goin, 1968)

Synonyms
- Centrolenella taylori Goin, 1968 "1967"

= Hyalinobatrachium taylori =

Taylor's glass frog

Species of amphibian

Hyalinobatrachium taylori is a species of frog in the family Centrolenidae. Its common name is Taylor's glass frog, and in Spanish, ranita de cristal de Taylor. It may represent at least two distinct species.

== Etymology ==
The specific name taylori honors Edward Harrison Taylor (1889–1978), an American herpetologist.

== Description ==
Hyalinobatrachium taylori has dark green dorsal ground colour with pale green spots, usually with one white fleck in the middle. Ventral skin is transparent, such that internal organs are visible. Bones are translucent green.

== Distribution and habitat ==
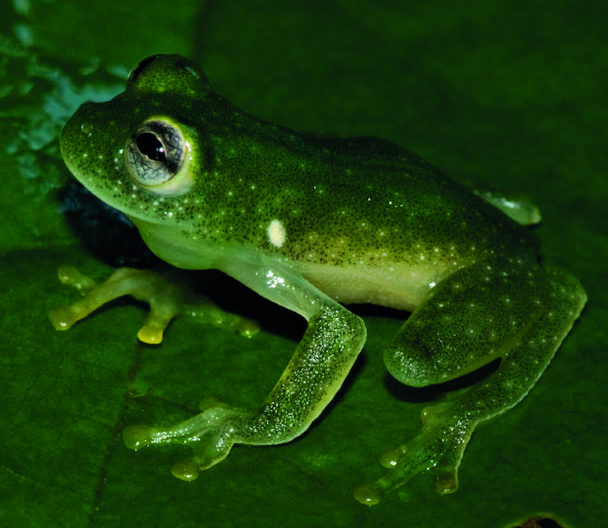
Amapá, Brazil

Hyalinobatrachium taylori is found from the Guiana Shield in French Guiana, Suriname, Guyana, and southeastern Venezuela, and presumably adjacent Brazil. The type locality, "New River, Guyana", is in the region claimed by Suriname.

Its natural habitats are tropical rainforest and montane Guianan forests near streams. This arboreal species lays its eggs on leaves overhanging streams, and upon hatching the tadpoles drop to the stream.

It is not considered threatened by the IUCN.
