= Espadarana audax =

Conservation status
- Least Concern (IUCN 3.1)

Scientific classification
- Kingdom: Animalia
- Phylum: Chordata
- Class: Amphibia
- Order: Anura
- Family: Centrolenidae
- Genus: Espadarana
- Species: E. audax

Binomial name
- Espadarana audax (Lynch and Duellman, 1973)

Synonyms
- Centrolenella audax Lynch and Duellman, 1973; Centrolene audax (Lynch and Duellman, 1973); Centrolene fernandoi Duellman and Schulte, 1993; Espadarana fernandoi (Duellman and Schulte, 1993)

Species of frog

Espadarana audax is a species of frog in the family Centrolenidae. It is found on the Amazonian versant of Andes in northeast Peru (San Martín Region), eastern Ecuador (Napo Province), and southern Colombia (Cauca and Putumayo Departments).

== Taxonomy ==
The generic placement of what was originally described as Centrolenella audax in 1973 has long been uncertain, but in 2014 it was placed in the genus Espadarana. At the same time, Centrolene fernandoi was brought into synonymy with Espadarana audax.

== Description ==
Adult males measure 22.5–26.4 mm (0.89–1.04 in) in snout–vent length. The snout is truncate or round in lateral view. The texture of dorsal skin is shagreen and includes spinules and white warts. The toes have some webbing.

== Habitat and conservation ==
The species' natural habitats are moist montane forests at elevations of 1,300–1,900 m (4,300–6,200 ft) above sea level.

Threats to this species, assessed at the time when Centrolene fernandoi was still recognized as a separate species, include habitat loss (deforestation from agriculture and logging) and chytridiomycosis.
