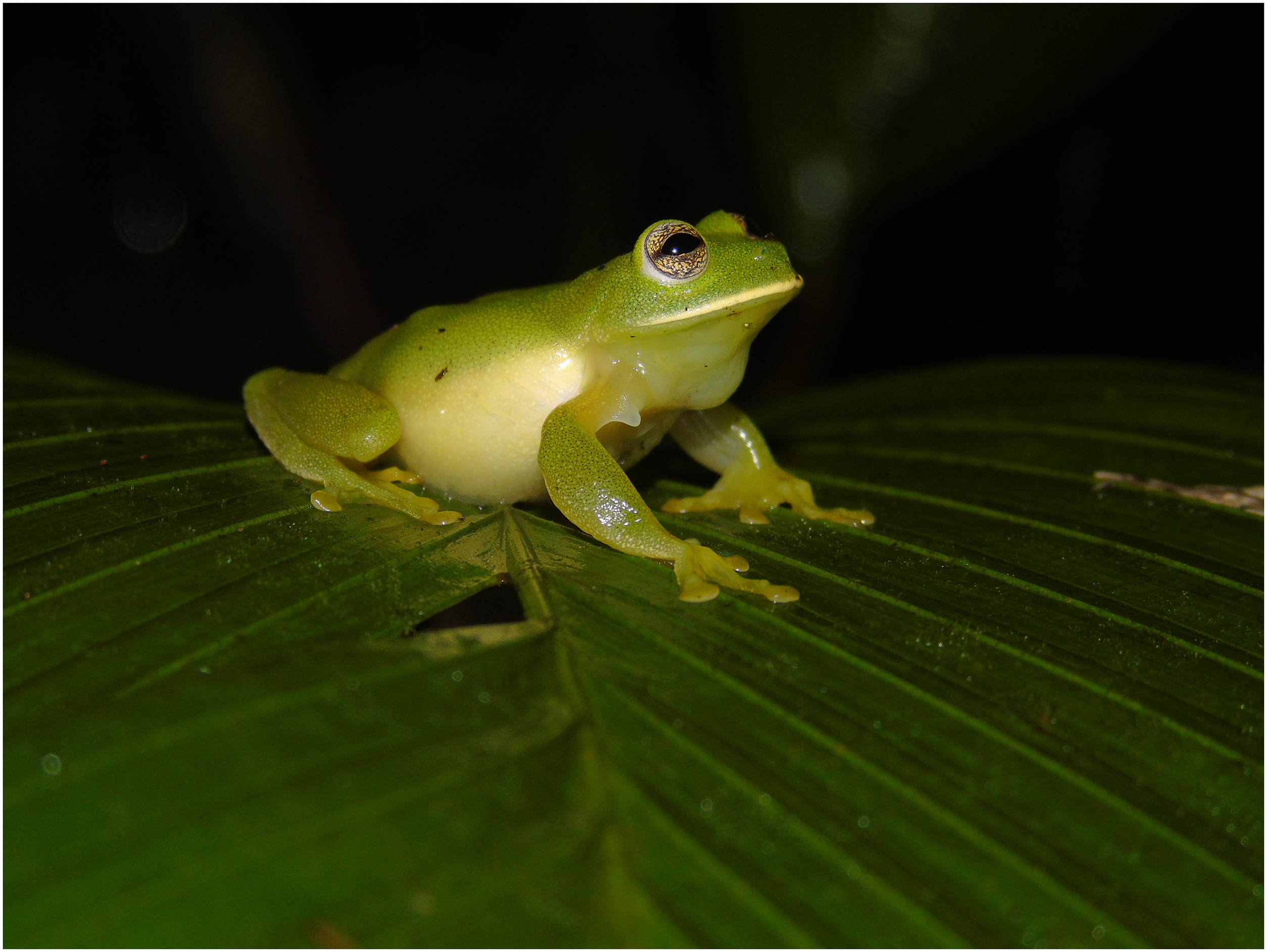
- Adult male of Ikakogi tayrona.

Scientific classification
- Kingdom: Animalia
- Phylum: Chordata
- Class: Amphibia
- Order: Anura
- Family: Centrolenidae
- Genus: Ikakogi; Guayasamin, Castroviejo-Fisher, Trueb, Ayarzagüena, Rada, and Vilà, 2009

= Ikakogi =

Genus of amphibians

Ikakogi is a genus of frogs in the family Centrolenidae. It has been tentatively placed in the subfamily Centroleninae, although more recent analyses suggest that it is the sister group of the clade Centroleninae+Hyalinobatrachiinae.

== Taxonomy ==
Until 2019, the genus was considered to be monotypic, but now contains the following two species:

- Ikakogi ispacue Rada, Dias, Peréz-González, Anganoy-Criollo, Rueda-Solano, Pinto-E., Mejía Quintero, Vargas-Salinas, and Grant, 2019
- Ikakogi tayrona (Ruiz-Carranza and Lynch, 1991)
