= Priscilla Hollister Starrett =

American herpetologist

- Born: Priscilla Latham Hollister; November 13, 1929; East Hartford, Connecticut
- Died: October 8, 1997 (aged 67); Inglewood, California
- Burial place: Hockanum Cemetery, East Hartford
- Education: University of Connecticut, University of Michigan
- Occupation: Herpetologist
- Spouse: Andrew Starrett
- Children: David, Laurel, Bruce
- Parents: George Hollister (father); Imogene Wadsworth (mother)

Priscilla Latham Hollister Starrett (November 13, 1929 – October 8, 1997) was an American herpetologist who researched anuran (frog) morphology, systematics and behavior.

== Biography ==
Born in East Hartford, Connecticut, to George Hollister and Imogene Wadsworth, she was known to friends as "Holly Starrett." She gained her B.A. and M.S. degrees from the University of Connecticut, earning the latter in 1951. She married Andrew Starrett in 1951 and moved to Los Angeles in 1964. She enrolled in the Ph.D. program at the University of Michigan in 1954 and, after time devoted to field work in Central America, was finally awarded the degree in 1969 with her dissertation titled "The phylogenetic significance of the jaw musculature in anuran amphibians.

=== Research ===
Starrett studied Central American frogs extensively, spending significant time in the field in Costa Rica in the late 1950s and early 1960s. She had a special interest in centrolenids (glass frogs) and hylids (tree frogs), with their taxonomy becoming the topic of several journal papers.

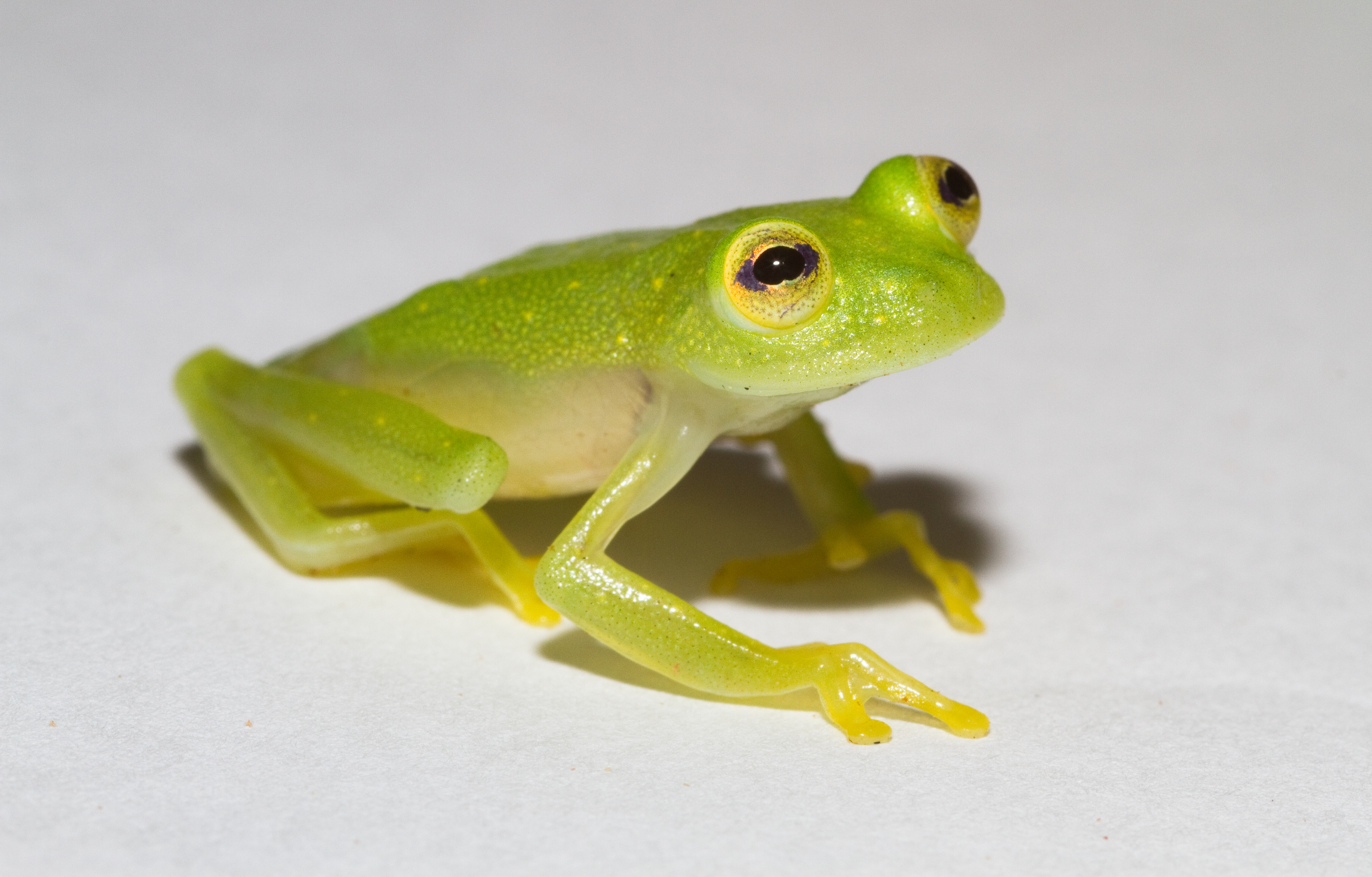
Starrett's glass frog, Hyalinobatrachium vireovittatum.

According to Emerson, who described Starrett's research, in the area of morphology, "her dissertation work was an important impetus leading to aspects of jaw musculature becoming standard characters in anuran systematic studies," In the area of tadpole development, "she studied muscle homologies, and proposed four basic tadpole types suggesting that larval characters could be important in studying the relationships among major groups on anurans.... She further suggested that the variation that she found in the jaw muscles and other internal morphology among tadpole types could be related to their feeding ecology."

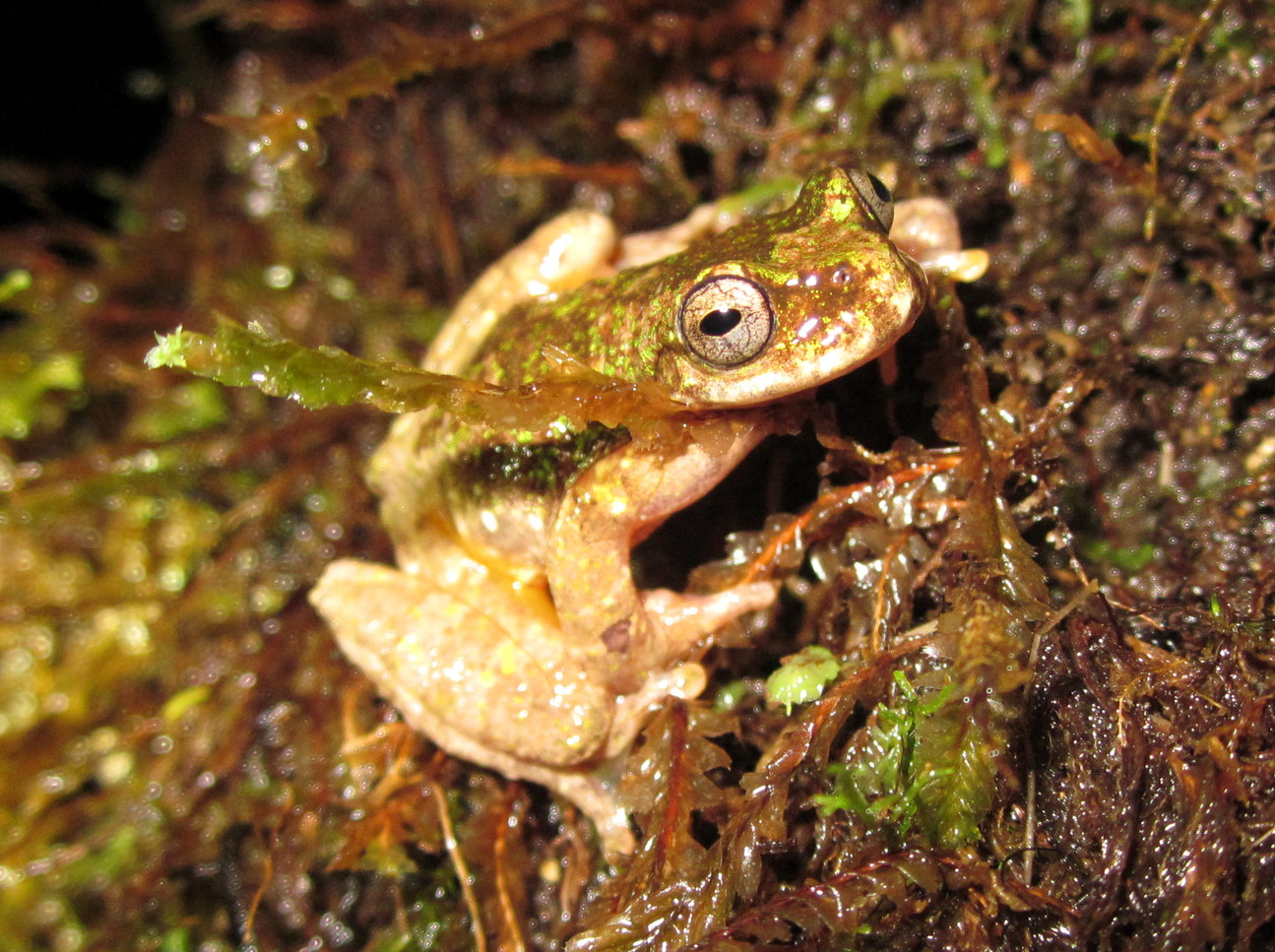
Starrett's treefrog. Isthmohyla tica

Starrett is commemorated in the names of Hyalinobatrachium vireovittatum (common name: Starrett's glass frog), a species in the family Centrolenidae, as well as the species of frog Isthmohyla tica, also known as Starrett's treefrog, in the family Hylidae.

In addition to her research, Starrett held faculty positions at the University of Southern California in Los Angeles from 1969 until she retired in 1992.

=== Later years ===
Starrett was a vocal advocate of environmental awareness. She died October 8, 1997, in Inglewood, California and is buried in Hockanum Cemetery, East Hartford, Connecticut.

== Selected publications ==
- Starrett, Priscilla. Food Habits of Connecticut Amphibians with Emphasis on the Storrs Area. (1953). Print.
- Starrett, Andrew, and Priscilla Starrett. "Observations on Young Blackfish, Globicephala." Journal of Mammalogy. 36.3 (1955): 424–429. Print.
- Uzzell, Thomas, Jr.; Priscilla Starrett. Snakes from El Salvador. (1958)
- Starrett, Priscilla. "A Redefinition of the Genus Smilisca." Copeia, vol. 1960, no. 4, 1960, pp. 300–304. JSTOR, www.jstor.org/stable/1439756. Accessed 23 Sept. 2020.
- Starrett, Priscilla Hollister. Descriptions of tadpoles of Middle American frogs. (1960)
- Starrett, Priscilla Hollister. The phylogenetic significance of the jaw musculature in anuran amphibians. (1969): 1535-1535.
- Starrett, Priscilla. Observations on the Life History of Frogs of the Family Atelopodidae. Herpetologica. 23.3 (1967): 195–204. Print.
- Starrett, Priscilla H. "Evolutionary patterns in larval morphology." Evolutionary biology of the anurans: contemporary research on major problems (1973): 251–271.
- Schwalm, Patricia A., Priscilla H. Starrett, and Roy W. McDiarmid. "Infrared Reflectance in Leaf-Sitting Neotropical Frogs." Science. 196.4295 (1977): 1225–1227. Print.
- Starrett, Priscilla H., and Jay M. Savage. "The systematic status and distribution of Costa Rican glass-frogs, genus Centrolenella (Family Centrolenidae), with description of a new species." Bulletin of the Southern California Academy of Sciences 72.2 (1973): 57–78.
- Starrett, Priscilla Holly, and Linda Sharon Bazilian. "Inheritance of the Call of the Bullfrog, Rana catesbeiana." Bulletin of the Southern California Academy of Sciences 95.2 (1996): 83–87.
