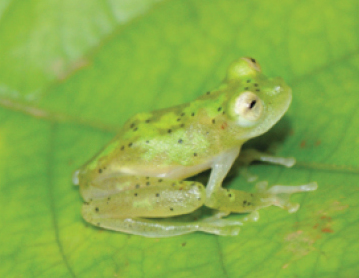

Conservation status
- Least Concern (IUCN 3.1)

Scientific classification
- Kingdom: Animalia
- Phylum: Chordata
- Class: Amphibia
- Order: Anura
- Family: Centrolenidae
- Genus: Hyalinobatrachium
- Species: H. iaspidiense

Binomial name
- Hyalinobatrachium iaspidiense (Ayarzagüena, 1992)

Synonyms
- Centrolenella iaspidiensis Ayarzagüena, 1992; Hyalinobatrachium nouraguensis Lescure and Marty, 2000

= Hyalinobatrachium iaspidiense =

Yuruani glass frog

Species of amphibian

Hyalinobatrachium iaspidiense, the Yuruani glass frog (in Spanish ranita de cristal de Jaspe), is a species of frog in the family Centrolenidae from South America. Its specific name refers Quebrada de Jaspe, its type locality.

There is some disagreement whether Hyalinobatrachium nouraguensis is a junior synonym of Hyalinobatrachium iaspidiense or not. Specifically, as of early 2016, the latest assessment from the International Union for Conservation of Nature (IUCN) treats Hyalinobatrachium nouraguensis as a valid species that is of "Least Concern".

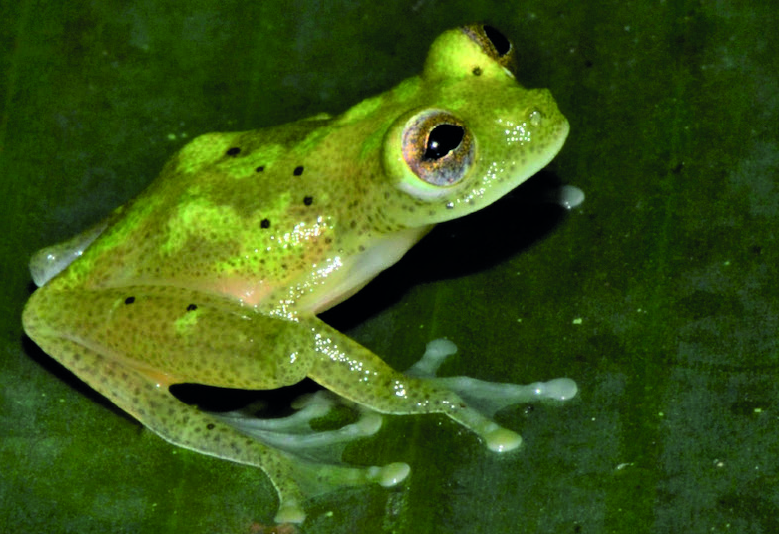
Amapá, Brazil

== Distribution ==
According to the more inclusive definition of Hyalinobatrachium iaspidiense, the species is distributed in Venezuelan Guiana, central Guyana, Suriname, French Guiana, western Ecuador (Sucumbíos and Napo Provinces), northeastern Peru (Loreto Region), and western Brazil (Amazonas and Mato Grosso).

It is expected to occur in Colombia but not recorded there.

== Description ==
Hyalinobatrachium iaspidiense grows to 20.4 mm (0.80 in) in snout–vent length. The eyes are large with yellow to dull silver iris. There is webbing between the third and fourth finger and between all the toes. The dorsum is yellowish green with leaf green spots. The belly is transparent as are parts of the peritoneum, revealing the heart; the visceral and parietal peritonea are white.

== Habitat and conservation ==
Its natural habitats are tropical forests along streams and rivers. It can locally suffer from habitat loss.
