= Hyalinobatrachium esmeralda =

Conservation status
- Endangered (IUCN 3.1)

Scientific classification
- Kingdom: Animalia
- Phylum: Chordata
- Class: Amphibia
- Order: Anura
- Family: Centrolenidae
- Genus: Hyalinobatrachium
- Species: H. esmeralda

Binomial name
- Hyalinobatrachium esmeralda Ruíz-Carranza & Lynch, 1998

Species of frog

Hyalinobatrachium esmeralda is a species of frogs in the family Centrolenidae. It is endemic to Colombia and only known from the eastern slope of the Cordillera Oriental in Boyacá and Casanare Departments at elevations of 1,600–1,750 m (5,250–5,740 ft) above sea level.

Its natural habitats are cloud forests where it occurs near streams. It is threatened by habitat loss.
