= Hyalinobatrachium fragile =

Conservation status
- Near Threatened (IUCN 3.1)

Scientific classification
- Kingdom: Animalia
- Phylum: Chordata
- Class: Amphibia
- Order: Anura
- Family: Centrolenidae
- Genus: Hyalinobatrachium
- Species: H. fragile

Binomial name
- Hyalinobatrachium fragile (Rivero, 1985)

Synonyms
- Centrolenella fragilis Rivero, 1985; Hyalinobatrachium fragilis

Species of frog

Hyalinobatrachium fragile is a species of frog in the family Centrolenidae. It is endemic to the Venezuelan Coastal Range. In Spanish it is known as ranita de cristal fragil.

Its natural habitats are montane forests, where it occurs along streams. It is threatened by habitat loss caused by agriculture and logging as well as landslides.
