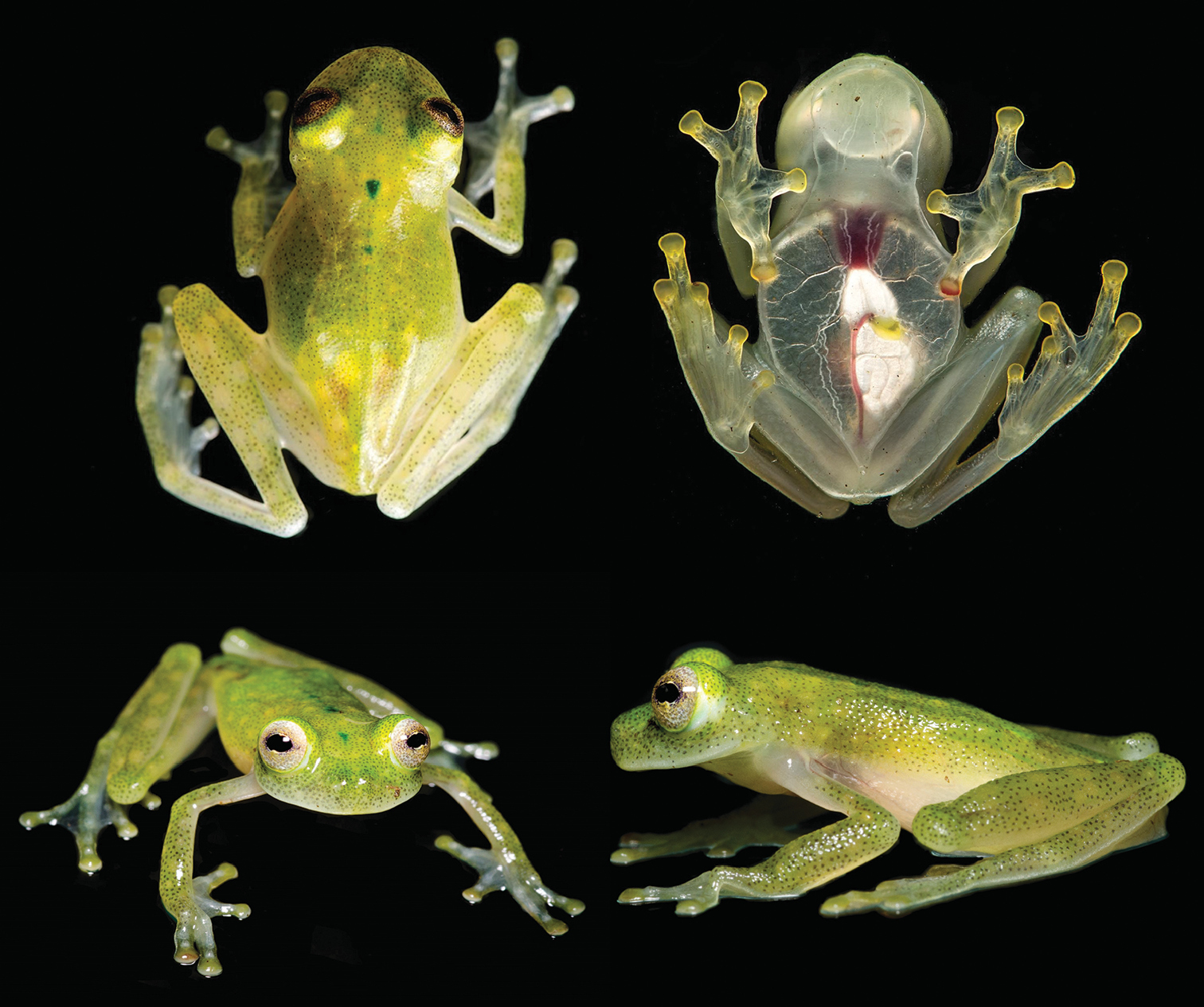

Scientific classification
- Kingdom: Animalia
- Phylum: Chordata
- Class: Amphibia
- Order: Anura
- Family: Centrolenidae
- Genus: Hyalinobatrachium
- Species: H. yaku

Binomial name
- Hyalinobatrachium yaku Guayasamin, Cisneros-Heredia, Maynard, Lynch, Culebras & Hamilton, 2017

= Hyalinobatrachium yaku =

Species of frog

Hyalinobatrachium yaku is a species of frog in the family Centrolenidae. It is found in the Pastaza, Orellana and Napo Provinces of Ecuador. One of the remarkable characteristics of this species is that their belly and some internal organs are transparent leaving the red heart completely exposed through transparent parietal peritoneum and pericardium. The glassfrogs are generally small, ranging from 0.8 to 3 inches (2-7.5 cm) in length. This species can be differentiated from other frogs in the Hyalinobatrachium genus by the row of dark green spots down the middle of its back.

It was described, by five researchers namely Juan Manuel Guayasamin, Diego F. Cisneros-Heredia, Ross J. Maynard, Ryan L. Lynch, Jaime Culebras and Paul S. Hamilton first published about the finding on May 12, 2017, in the journal ZooKeys.
