= Hyalinobatrachium pallidum =

Guacharaquita glass frog

Conservation status
- Near Threatened (IUCN 3.1)

Scientific classification
- Kingdom: Animalia
- Phylum: Chordata
- Class: Amphibia
- Order: Anura
- Family: Centrolenidae
- Genus: Hyalinobatrachium
- Species: H. pallidum

Binomial name
- Hyalinobatrachium pallidum (Rivero, 1985)

Synonyms
- Centrolenella pallida Rivero, 1985

Species of amphibian

Hyalinobatrachium pallidum (common name: Guacharaquita glass frog, in Spanish ranita de cristal pálida) is a species of frog in the family Centrolenidae. It is endemic to Venezuela. It is known from its type locality, Guacharaquita between La Grita and Páramo de La Negra in the Táchira state, and from a number of sites in the Sierra de Perijá, Zulia state. Its altitudinal range is 1,132–1,832 m (3,714–6,010 ft) asl. There is also an unconfirmed record from San Isidro in the Barinas state.

== Description ==
Males measure 21.2–25.0 mm (0.83–0.98 in) and females 23.0–24.8 mm (0.91–0.98 in) in snout–vent length. The pericardium is light golden. Many individuals from the Sierra de Perijá have a number of irregular black flecks on the dorsum, head, and dorsal surfaces of the limbs.

== Habitat and conservation ==
In the Sierra de Perijá, Hyalinobatrachium pallidum was abundant and reproductively active at two localities with small fast-flowing creeks surrounded by primary cloud forest and abundant stream-side vegetation. It was scarce at a third locality, a small creek in secondary forest with shaded coffee plantations.

The Guacharaquita population was considered almost extirpated by habitat loss in the assessment by the International Union for Conservation of Nature (IUCN) in 2004. However, Rojas-Runjaic and colleagues suggest that the conservation status of this species should be reassessed in light of broader distribution than was known at the time of the assessment.
