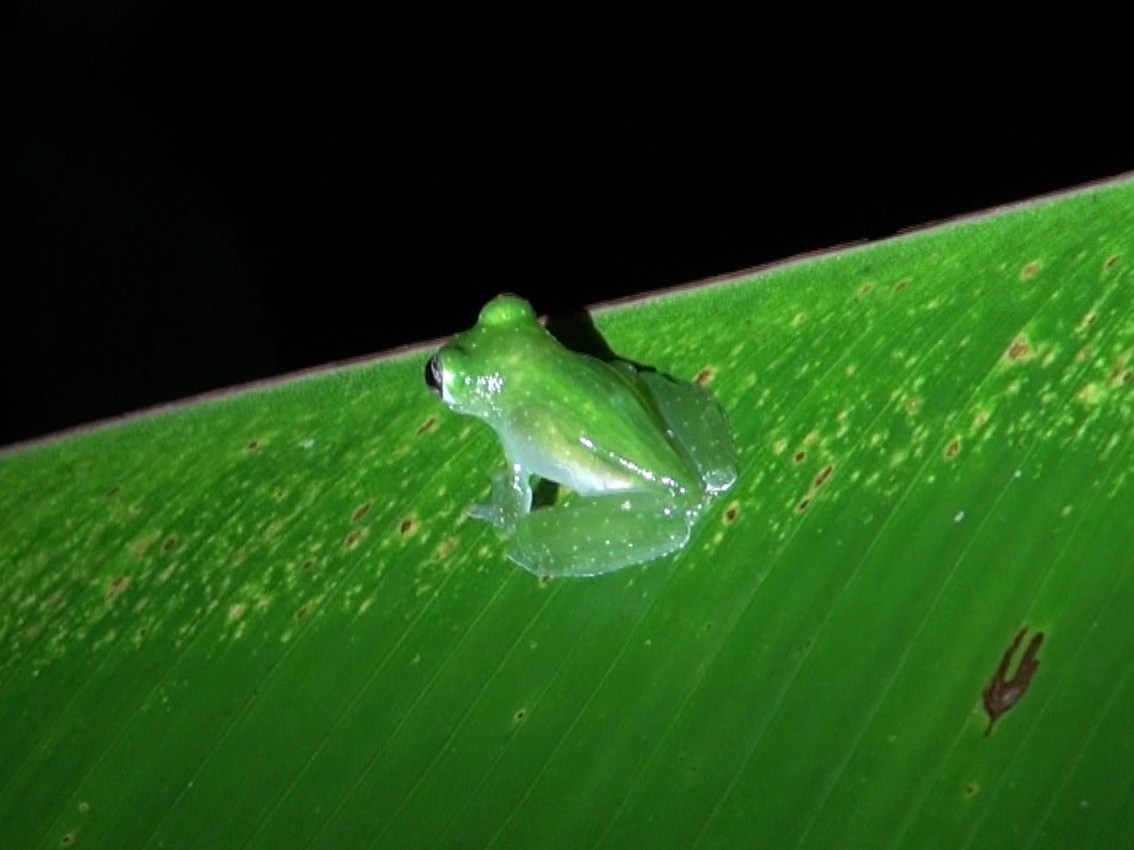

Conservation status
- Least Concern (IUCN 3.1)

Scientific classification
- Kingdom: Animalia
- Phylum: Chordata
- Class: Amphibia
- Order: Anura
- Family: Centrolenidae
- Genus: Hyalinobatrachium
- Species: H. valerioi

Binomial name
- Hyalinobatrachium valerioi (Dunn, 1931)

Synonyms
- Centrolene valerioi Dunn, 1931; Cochranella valerioi (Dunn, 1931); Centrolenella valerioi (Dunn, 1931); Cochranella reticulata Taylor, 1958

= Hyalinobatrachium valerioi =

Species of amphibian

Hyalinobatrachium valerioi, sometimes known as the La Palma glass frog, is a species of frog in the family Centrolenidae. It is found in central Costa Rica and south to Panama and the Pacific lowlands and slopes of western Colombia and Ecuador; also in the Magdalena River Valley of Colombia (Colombian distribution is poorly resolved).

== Description ==
Males grow to 24 mm (0.94 in) and females to 26 mm (1.0 in) in snout–vent length. The dorsum is spotted yellow, with green reticulations between the spots. There might be some small dark spots in the green areas. The ventral surface is transparent, however the heart is covered by white tissue and is not visible. Also the liver and digestive tract are white. Their eye color is gold.

Hyalinobatrachium valerioi glass frogs are carnivores, their diet mainly including small insects like crickets, moths, flies, spiders, and other smaller frogs.

The egg clutches, containing no more than 40 eggs, are laid on the underside of leaves over streams. Contrary to most other glass frogs, the male remains with its egg clutches also during daylight hours, performing 24-hour egg attendance.

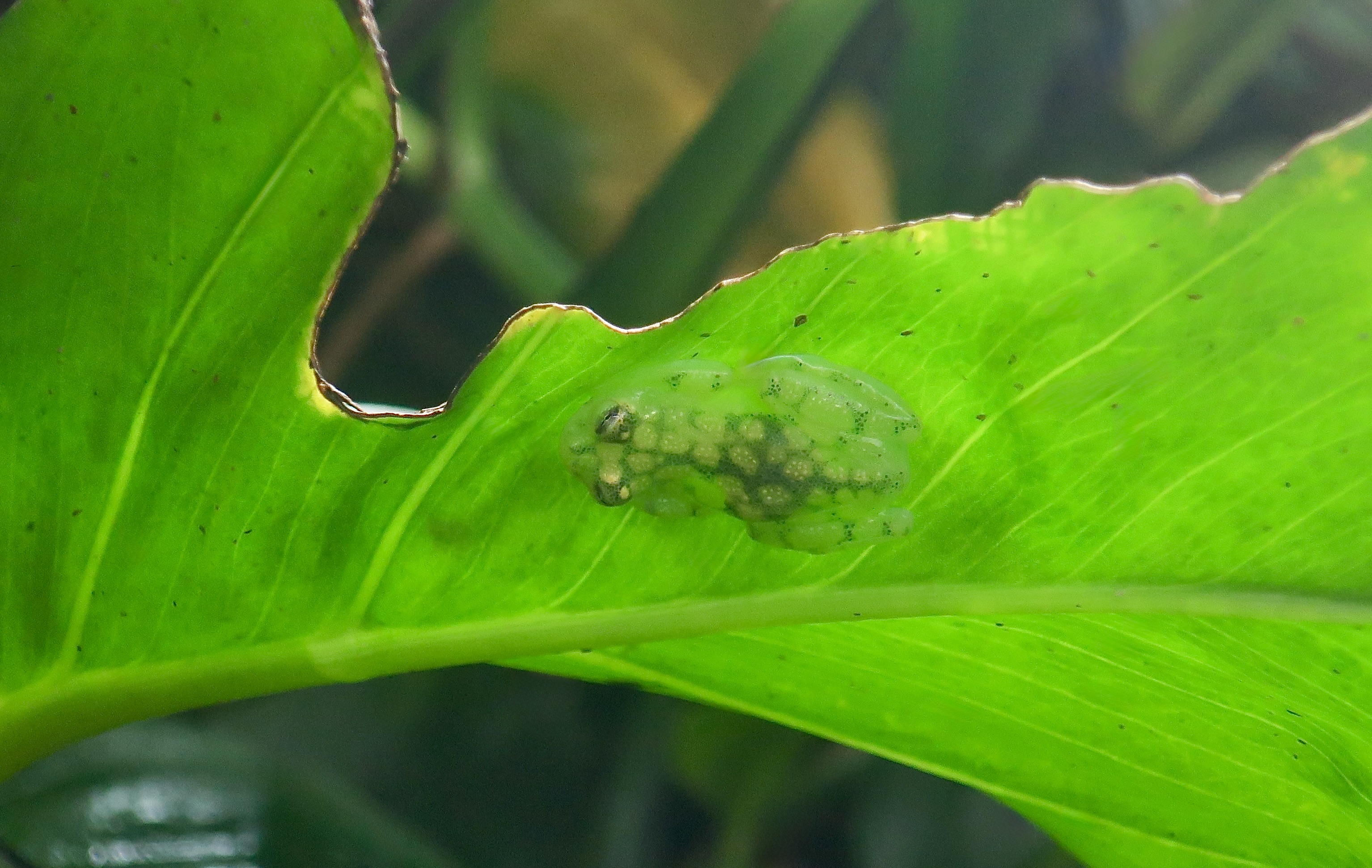
Hiding under a leaf at Bronx Zoo.

== Habitat and conservation ==
Its natural habitats are moist primary and secondary lowland forests. Adult frogs are typically found in bushes and trees along forest streams. The species tolerates some habitat modification, provided that vegetation over streams remains.

Hyalinobatrachium valerioi is declining in parts of its range while it is considered stable in others. Habitat loss (deforestation) is a significant threat, as is pollution from the spraying of illegal crops.
