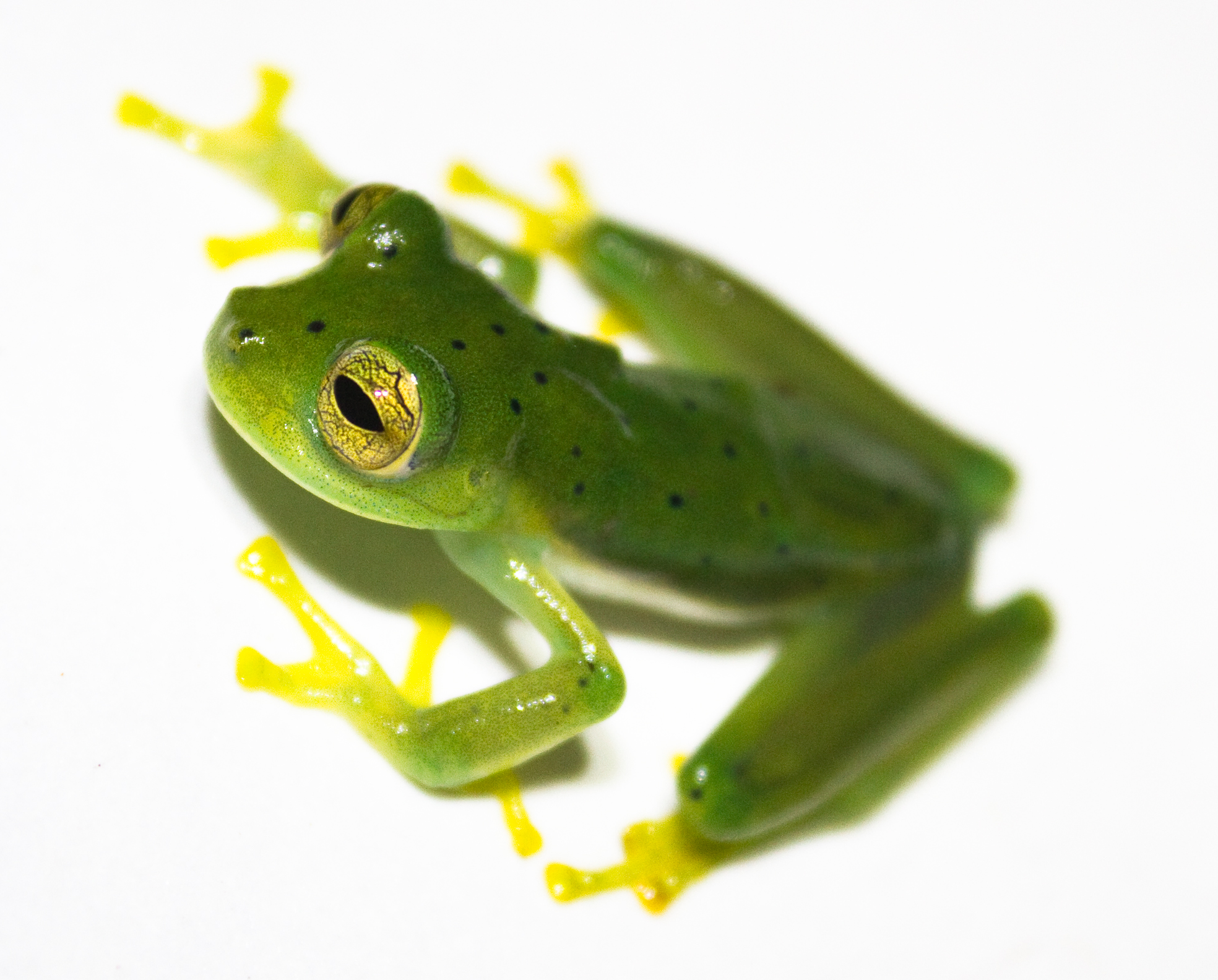
- Espadarana prosoblepon

Scientific classification
- Kingdom: Animalia
- Phylum: Chordata
- Class: Amphibia
- Order: Anura
- Family: Centrolenidae
- Subfamily: Centroleninae
- Genus: Espadarana; Guayasamin, Castroviejo-Fisher, Trueb, Ayarzagüena, Rada, and Vilà, 2009

Type species
- Centrolenella andina Rivero, 1968

= Espadarana =

Genus of amphibians

Espadarana is a genus of glass frogs. They are found in Central America (Honduras, Nicaragua, Costa Rica, Panama) and northern South America (Venezuela, Colombia, and Ecuador).

== Etymology ==
The generic name Espadarana honors Marcos Jiménez de la Espada, a Spanish zoologist. Among other things, he described the first centrolenid frog, Centrolene geckoideum in 1872. Moreover, the Spanish word espada means "sword", which can be associated with the humeral spines that adult male Espadarana have.

== Description ==
The diagnostic characters of Espadarana include conspicuous humeral spines present in adult males, as hinted in their name. There is moderate webbing between third and fourth fingers. The dorsum is lavender in preserved individuals and may have spots. Internal features include green bones (in live specimens), lobed liver covered by a transparent hepatic peritoneum, whereas the ventral parietal peritoneum is white in its anterior part and transparent in its poster part. The digestive tract is translucent. In terms of osteology, Espadarana possess vomerine teeth and quadratojugal bone that is articulating with maxilla.

== Reproduction ==
In Espadarana, males call while sitting on leaves or branches. The eggs are deposited on leaves over streams.

== Species ==
The genus contains five species:

- Espadarana andina (Rivero, 1968)
- Espadarana audax (Lynch and Duellman, 1973)
- Espadarana callistomma (Guayasamin and Trueb, 2007)
- Espadarana durrellorum (Cisneros-Heredia, 2007)
- Espadarana prosoblepon (Boettger, 1892)
