= Hyalinobatrachium guairarepanense =

Conservation status
- Endangered (IUCN 3.1)

Scientific classification
- Kingdom: Animalia
- Phylum: Chordata
- Class: Amphibia
- Order: Anura
- Family: Centrolenidae
- Genus: Hyalinobatrachium
- Species: H. guairarepanense

Binomial name
- Hyalinobatrachium guairarepanense Señaris, 2001

Synonyms
- Hyalinobatrachium guairarepanensis Señaris, 2001

Species of frog

Hyalinobatrachium guairarepanense, the Avila glass frog, is a species of frog in the family Centrolenidae. It is endemic to Venezuela, where it is found in locations in the Coastal Range at elevations between 720 and 1,000 m (2,360 and 3,280 ft) above sea level.

Its natural habitats are seasonal (semi-deciduous) forests where it occurs along streams. The eggs are laid on leaves overhanging a stream to which the hatched larvae drop and where they continue their development. It is threatened by habitat loss. However, it has declined also in pristine habitats, suggesting that chytridiomycosis (or other disease) may be at play. Its range includes the El Ávila National Park and the Macarao National Park.
