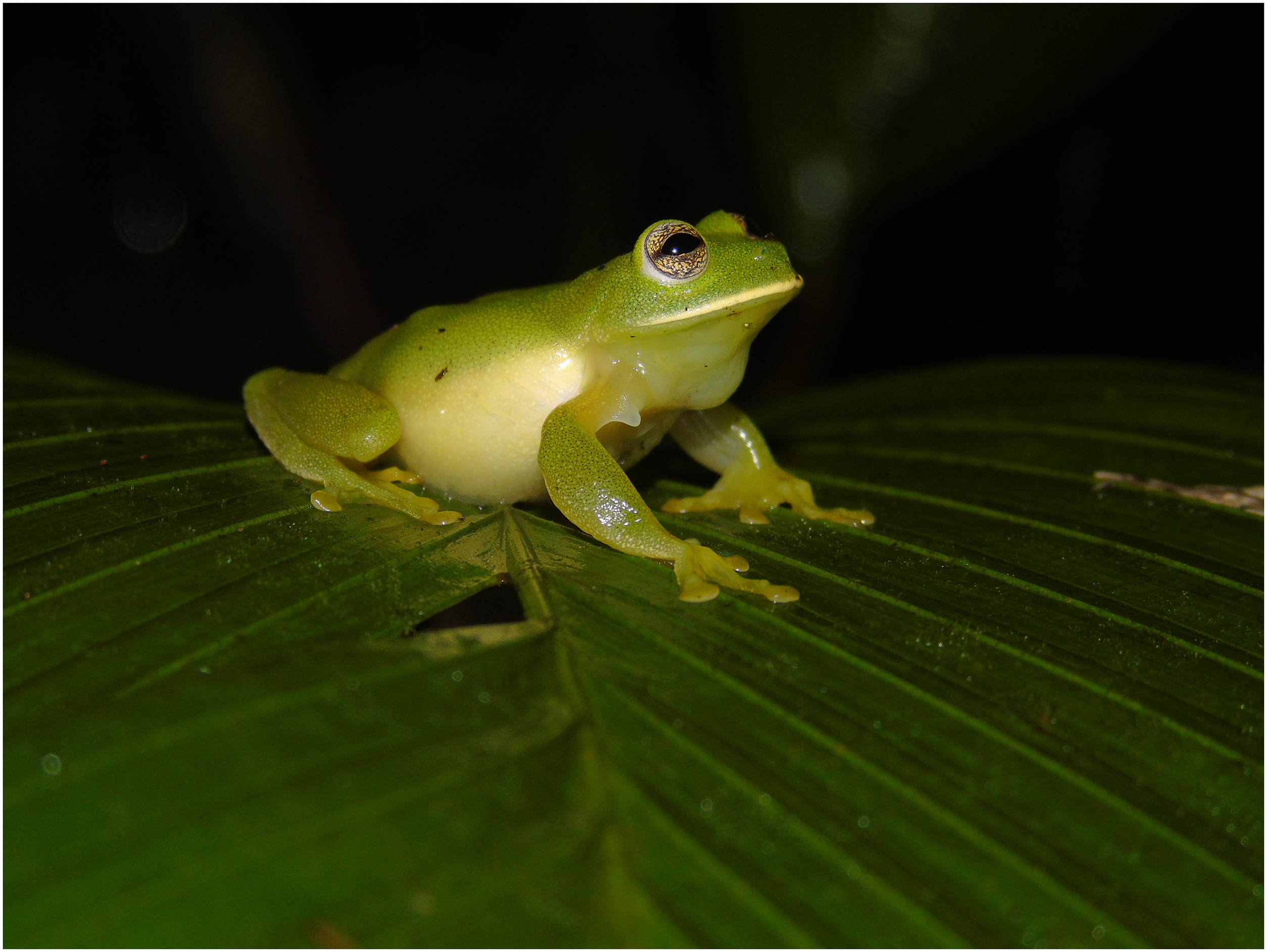
- Adult male

Conservation status
- Vulnerable (IUCN 3.1)

Scientific classification
- Kingdom: Animalia
- Phylum: Chordata
- Class: Amphibia
- Order: Anura
- Family: Centrolenidae
- Genus: Ikakogi
- Species: I. tayrona

Binomial name
- Ikakogi tayrona (Ruiz-Carranza and Lynch, 1991)

Synonyms
- Centrolene tayrona Ruíz-Carranza and Lynch, 1991; Centrolenella savagei Harding, 1991

= Ikakogi tayrona =

Species of amphibian

Ikakogi tayrona, or the Magdalena giant glass frog, is a species of frog in the family Centrolenidae. It is endemic to the Sierra Nevada de Santa Marta, Magdalena Department, Colombia. It is the only glass frog that is known to show maternal care (in other glass frogs parental care is provided by males, if at all).

== Description ==
Males measure 28.2–30.6 mm (1.11–1.20 in) and females 28.2–30.8 mm (1.11–1.21 in) in snout–vent length. The head is large and wide with snout that is rounded when viewed dorsally but sloped and truncated when viewed laterally. The color is green to pale green, and dorsal skin is granular. The males have a large humeral spine.

=== Reproduction ===
Ikakogi tayrona breed on vegetation alongside streams. Males call from the same or nearby leaves, night after night, sometimes engaging in male-male combats. Oviposition takes place on the same leaves where males have been calling some 0.5–2 m (1 ft 8 in – 6 ft 7 in) above the ground (higher oviposition sites are possible but difficult to observe). Only the females have been observed to attend egg clutches. Attendance is nearly continuous during the night, whereas during the day the female may temporarily leave the clutch. Experimental removal of attending females greatly increased mortality of the eggs.

== Habitat and conservation ==
Its natural habitats are sub-Andean forests and cloud forests where it occurs on vegetation near water. The elevational range is 700–2,400 m (2,300–7,900 ft) above sea level. Part of the range is protected within the Sierra Nevada de Santa Marta National Natural Park and in the El Dorado Nature Reserve by Fundación ProAves. Outside the protected areas, it is threatened by habitat loss. Also pollution of water and fumigation of crops are threats.

== See also ==
- Ikakogi ispacue
