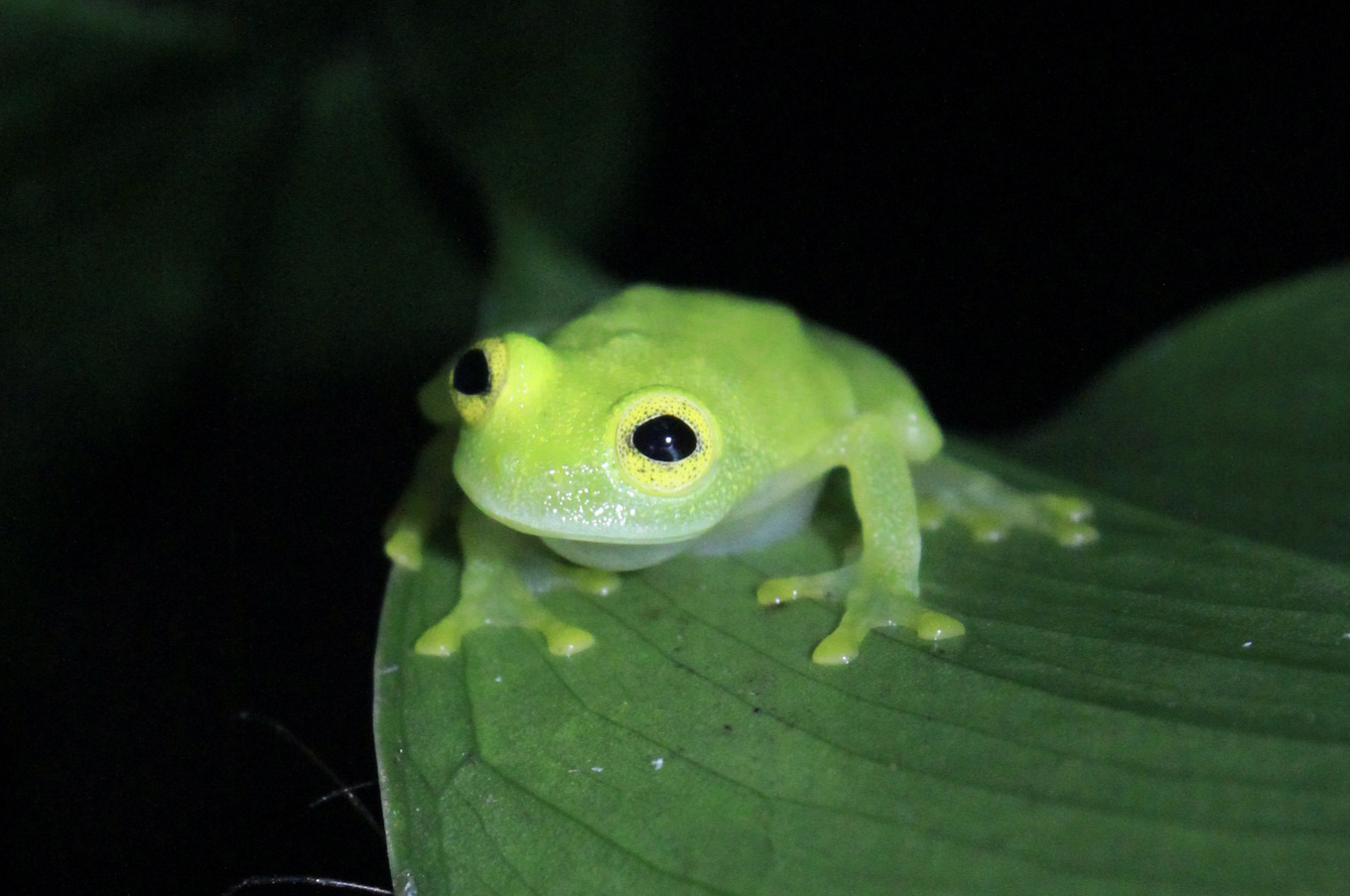

Conservation status
- Vulnerable (IUCN 3.1)

Scientific classification
- Kingdom: Animalia
- Phylum: Chordata
- Class: Amphibia
- Order: Anura
- Family: Centrolenidae
- Genus: Hyalinobatrachium
- Species: H. orientale

Binomial name
- Hyalinobatrachium orientale (Rivero, 1968)

Synonyms
- Centrolenella orientalis Rivero, 1968

= Hyalinobatrachium orientale =

Eastern glass frog

Species of amphibian

Hyalinobatrachium orientale is a species of glass frog in the family Centrolenidae. It is found on the island of Tobago and in eastern Venezuela (Paria Peninsula and Sierra de Lema). Its common name is eastern glass frog (in Spanish ranita de cristal oriental). The Tobagonian population has been described as subspecies Hyalinobatrachium orientalis tobagoensis (Hardy, 1984). The latter is sometimes referred to as Tobago glass frog. H. orientale is distributed throughout the Central Eastern ranges of the Cordillera de la Costa (the coastal mountain range) in Venezuela and Tobago Island with an altitudinal range of 190 to 1200 meters.

Glass frog embryos are able to hatch in regards to environmental cues with risk factors. Egg clutches of glass frogs are always usually laid on the undersides of Heliconia leaves.

Its natural habitats are tropical rainforests. It is threatened by habitat loss.
