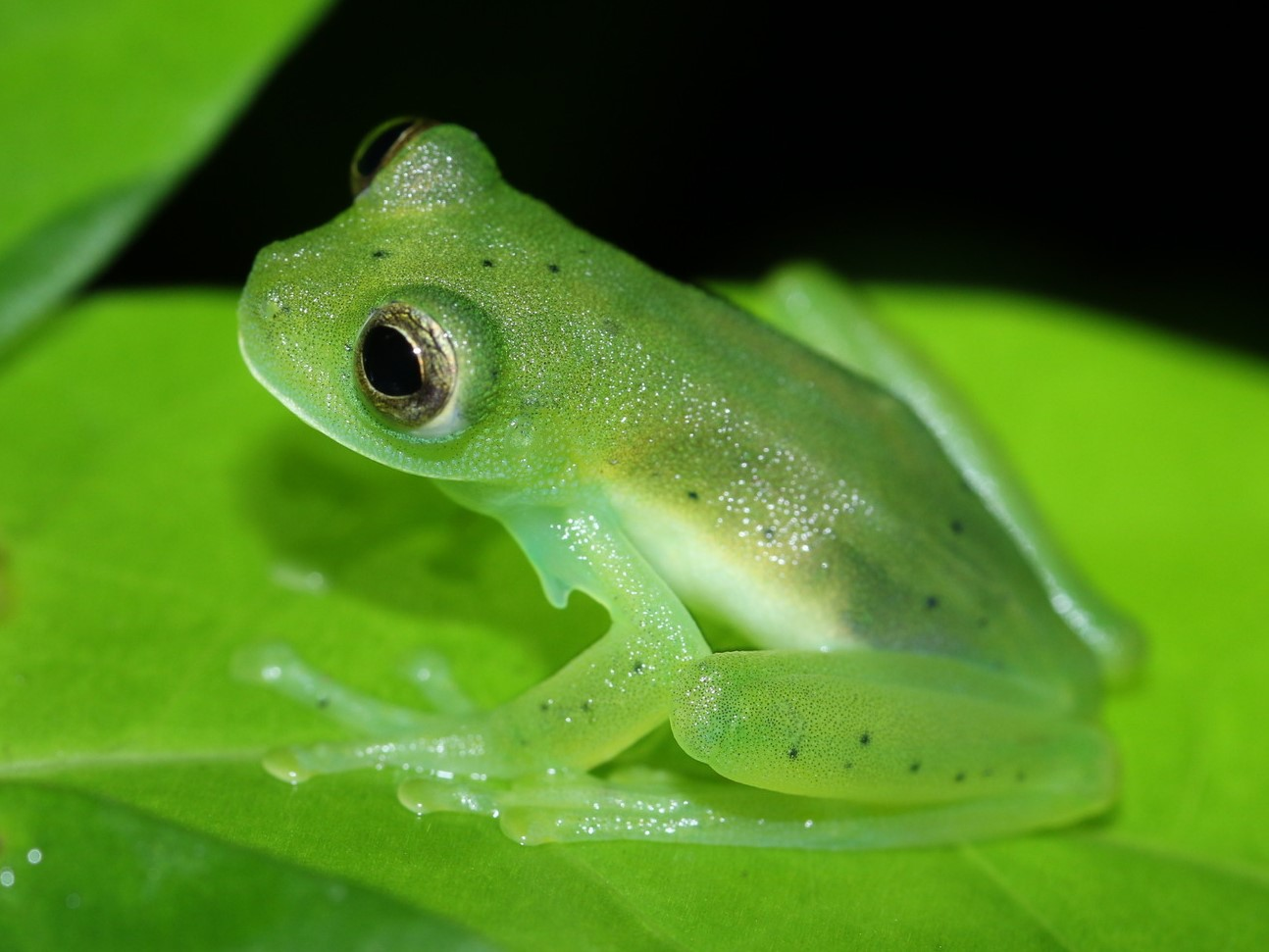

Conservation status
- Least Concern (IUCN 3.1)

Scientific classification
- Kingdom: Animalia
- Phylum: Chordata
- Class: Amphibia
- Order: Anura
- Family: Centrolenidae
- Genus: Espadarana
- Species: E. andina

Binomial name
- Espadarana andina (Rivero, 1968)

Synonyms
- Centrolenella andina Rivero, 1968; Centrolenella lentiginosa Rivero, 1985; Centrolene lentiginosum (Rivero, 1985); Centrolene andinum (Rivero, 1968)

= Andes giant glass frog =

Species of amphibian

The Andes giant glass frog (Espadarana andina) is a species of frog in the family Centrolenidae. It is found in the Cordillera Oriental of Colombia and the Mérida Andes and Serranía del Perijá of Venezuela.

Its natural habitats are cloud forests and montane evergreen dry forests. It lives along mountain streams and lays its eggs on vegetation over the streams. It is not considered threatened by the IUCN.

== Reproductive patterns ==
These frogs exhibit a form of parental care known as egg attendance. Unlike many amphibians that lay their eggs in water bodies and leave them unattended, Espadarana Andina's parents remain with their eggs after laying them. They actively attend to the eggs, providing protection and ensuring their well-being until they hatch. This behavior is believed to enhance the survival rate of the offspring by guarding them against predators and environmental threats. A study conducted in a stream located in the Vereda Agua Blanca, Río Frio River basin in Santander, Colombia, analyzed patterns of reproduction sites in Espadarana andina. The study concluded that preferences for sites used by males to call for females, and for females to oviposit (lay eggs) was not impacted by environmental factors such as transitions to and from rainy and dry seasons, time of day, or month of the year. The study showed that oviposition occurred the most on the invasive plant Hedychium coronarium. A study conducted in the Colombian Andes during the rainy season examined that male mating success was unaffected by the height of the calling place or the number of nights calling; larger males had a higher likelihood of mating than smaller males.

== Development ==
The offspring is characterized by spots and a brown cast over their skin. However, much like their adult forms, the offspring possesses translucent skin, and perhaps most noticeably, the chondrocranium underneath is visible. The frogs starts maturation in its eyes and nares. In the initial stages, the nares grow closer to the eyes than the snout, but as the frog develops, its nares grows closer to its snout. And, in the initial stages, its eyesight is not developed but as it matures, so does its eyesight. This is because the tadpole's eyes develop dorsolateral abilities, which means that it develops functioning eyesight. As for the beak and snout, tadpoles have keratinized beaks that later disappear while its denticles turn into papillae. Moreover, the fins that are responsible for propelling tadpoles through water form into legs through its development as a tadpole and then a frog.
