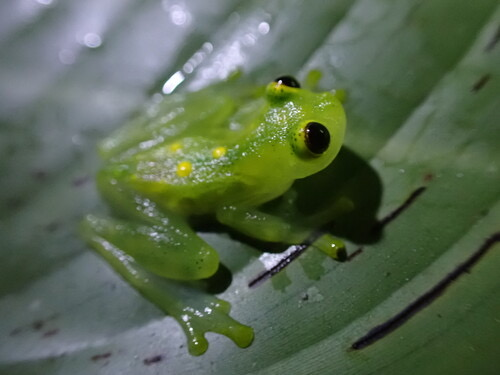

Conservation status
- Least Concern (IUCN 3.1)

Scientific classification
- Kingdom: Animalia
- Phylum: Chordata
- Class: Amphibia
- Order: Anura
- Family: Centrolenidae
- Genus: Hyalinobatrachium
- Species: H. aureoguttatum

Binomial name
- Hyalinobatrachium aureoguttatum (Barrera-Rodrigues and Ruiz-Carranza, 1989)

Synonyms
- Centrolenella aureoguttata Barrera-Rodriguez and Ruíz-Carranza, 1989

= Hyalinobatrachium aureoguttatum =

Species of frog

Hyalinobatrachium aureoguttatum, also known as the Atrato Glass Frog and Sun Glassfrog, is a species of frog in the family Centrolenidae. It is found in northern Ecuador (Esmeraldas and Imbabura Provinces), Pacific lowlands and western slopes of the Cordillera Occidental in Colombia, and eastern Panama (Darién Province). It occurs from near sea level to 1,560 m (5,120 ft) asl.

== Description ==
Males measure 20–24 mm (0.79–0.94 in) and females 23–24 mm (0.91–0.94 in) in snout–vent length. They are yellow-green dorsally, with numerous small brown and larger, more distinct creamy yellow spots. There is a diffuse green middorsal stripe. The ventral surface is transparent.

== Reproduction ==
Males call from vegetation above streams. Clutch size is up to 35 eggs; eggs are green and encased in a gelatinous mass. Eggs are laid on the lower surface of leaves. After hatching the tadpoles fall into the stream below. Males appear sometimes to guard the eggs.

== Habitat and conservation ==
Natural habitats of Hyalinobatrachium aureoguttatum are lowland primary and secondary rainforests as well as sub-Andean forests (cloud forests). It occurs on vegetation next to streams. It is a very common species but at least locally threatened by habitat loss. It occurs in a number of protected areas.
