= Hyalinobatrachium duranti =

Conservation status
- Endangered (IUCN 3.1)

Scientific classification
- Kingdom: Animalia
- Phylum: Chordata
- Class: Amphibia
- Order: Anura
- Family: Centrolenidae
- Genus: Hyalinobatrachium
- Species: H. duranti

Binomial name
- Hyalinobatrachium duranti (Rivero, 1985)

Synonyms
- Centrolenella duranti Rivero, 1985 Hyalinobatrachium loreocarinatus (Rivero, 1985); Hyalinobatrachium ostracodermoides (Rivero, 1985); Hyalinobatrachium pleurolineatum (Rivero, 1985)

Species of frog

Hyalinobatrachium duranti is a species of frog in the family Centrolenidae. It is endemic to the Cordillera de Mérida, Venezuela. In Spanish it is known as ranita de cristal de Durant. Its natural habitats are montane cloud forests where it occurs along cascading mountain streams. Its status is insufficiently known.
