= Hyalinobatrachium ibama =

Conservation status
- Least Concern (IUCN 3.1)

Scientific classification
- Kingdom: Animalia
- Phylum: Chordata
- Class: Amphibia
- Order: Anura
- Family: Centrolenidae
- Genus: Hyalinobatrachium
- Species: H. ibama

Binomial name
- Hyalinobatrachium ibama Ruíz-Carranza & Lynch, 1998

Species of frog

Hyalinobatrachium ibama is a species of frog in the family Centrolenidae. It is found in the Cordillera Oriental, Santander Department, Colombia, and in Barinas, Venezuela.

Its natural habitats are old-growth forests near streams. It is threatened by habitat loss.
