= Hyalinobatrachium munozorum =

Conservation status
- Least Concern (IUCN 3.1)

Scientific classification
- Kingdom: Animalia
- Phylum: Chordata
- Class: Amphibia
- Order: Anura
- Family: Centrolenidae
- Genus: Hyalinobatrachium
- Species: H. munozorum

Binomial name
- Hyalinobatrachium munozorum (Lynch and Duellman, 1973)

Synonyms
- Centrolenella munozorum Lynch and Duellman, 1973; Hyalinobatrachium munozorum Ruiz-Carranza and Lynch, 1991; Hyalinobatrachium ruedai Ruiz-Carranza and Lynch, 1998

Species of amphibian

Hyalinobatrachium munozorum, also known as Upper Amazon glass frog, is a species of frog in the family Centrolenidae. It is found in the upper Amazon Basin in Ecuador, Colombia, and northern Bolivia; it is presumably to be found in intervening Peru; earlier records from Peru have been assigned to Hyalinobatrachium carlesvilai.

Males measure 20–22 mm (0.79–0.87 in) and females 21–24 mm (0.83–0.94 in) in snout–vent length.
