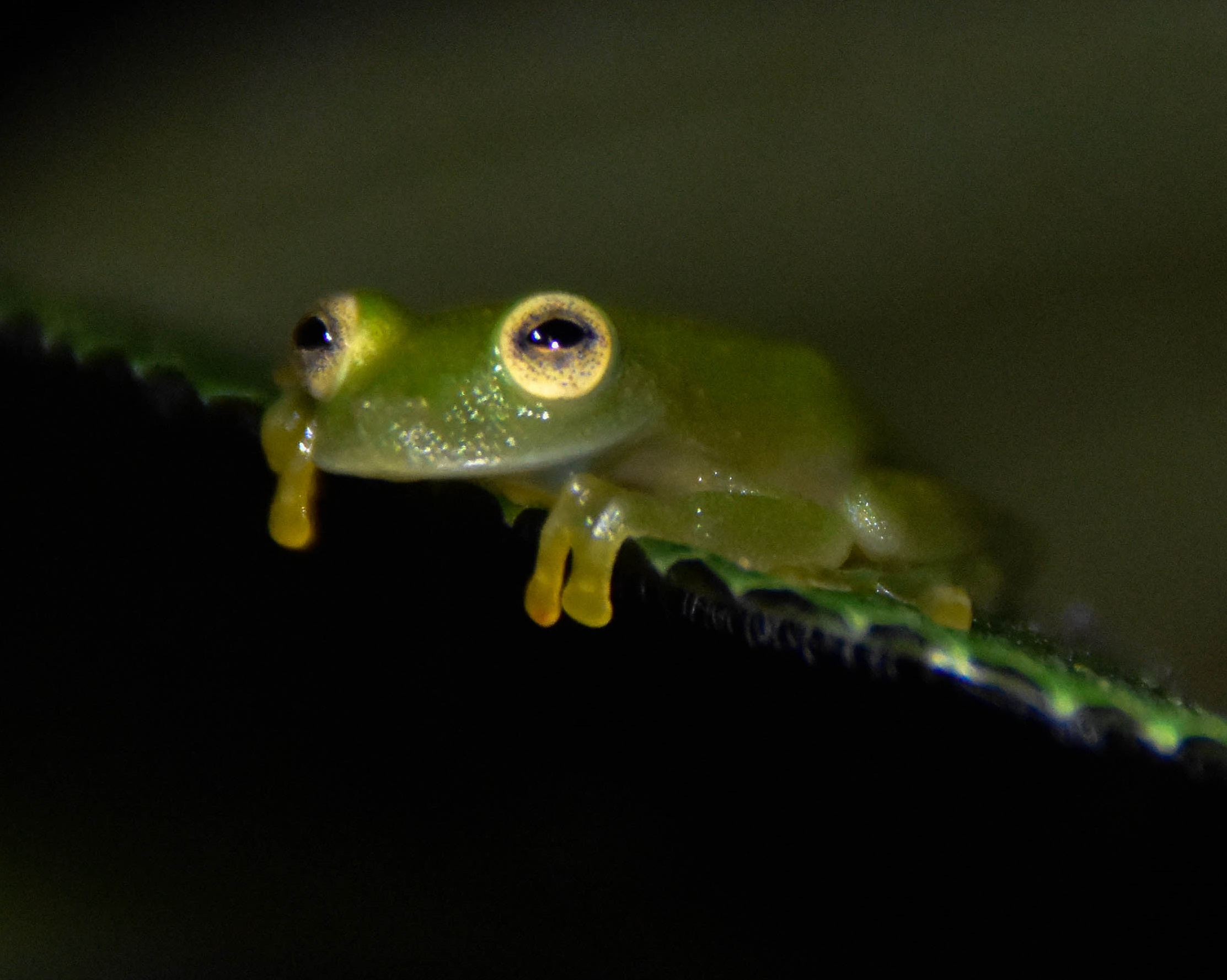

Conservation status
- Least Concern (IUCN 3.1)

Scientific classification
- Kingdom: Animalia
- Phylum: Chordata
- Class: Amphibia
- Order: Anura
- Family: Centrolenidae
- Genus: Hyalinobatrachium
- Species: H. chirripoi

Binomial name
- Hyalinobatrachium chirripoi (Taylor, 1958)

Synonyms
- Cochranella chirripoi Taylor, 1958; Centrolenella chirripoi (Taylor, 1958); Hyalinobatrachium cardiacalyptum McCranie and Wilson, 1997

= Hyalinobatrachium chirripoi =

Species of frog

Hyalinobatrachium chirripoi is a species of frog in the family Centrolenidae. It is found in extreme northern Ecuador, northwestern Colombia (Chocó and Córdoba west and north of Cordillera Occidental), Panama, and Costa Rica, as well as in Honduras. The specific name chirripoi refers to the Chirripó Indians inhabiting the area of the type locality, Suretka in the Talamanca canton of Costa Rica. The common name Suretka glass frog has been coined for it.

== Description ==
Adult males measure 24–26 mm (0.9–1.0 in) and adult females 26–30 mm (1.0–1.2 in) in snout–vent length. The tympanum is not visible. The finger and toe tips have truncate tips. The digits are webbed, the toes extensively so. The dorsum is green and is covered with tiny yellow spots. The ventral surface is transparent, revealing the red heart and the white digestive tract and liver. The iris is golden yellow.

== Habitat and conservation ==
Its natural habitats are humid lowland and montane forests and pastures below 600 m (2,000 ft) above sea level. It can also occur in degraded habitats, especially in Costa Rica. Adults are found in bushes and trees along forest streams. The eggs are laid on the underside of smooth leaves overhanging streams. After hatching, the tadpoles drop into the water below.

Hyalinobatrachium chirripoi is common in parts of its range. It can be locally threatened by habitat loss caused by increasing agricultural cultivation and logging. Its range overlaps with a number of protected areas in Colombia, Panama, and Costa Rica.
