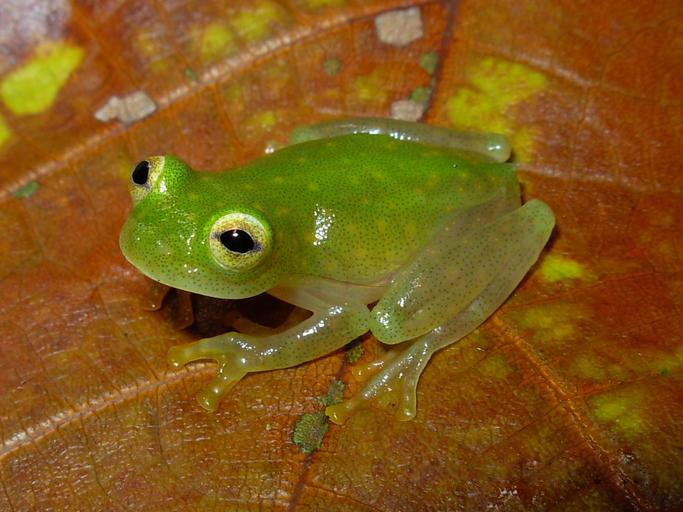
- Hyalinobatrachium fleischmanni

Scientific classification
- Kingdom: Animalia
- Phylum: Chordata
- Class: Amphibia
- Order: Anura
- Family: Centrolenidae
- Subfamily: Hyalinobatrachinae
- Genus: Hyalinobatrachium; Ruiz-Carranza and Lynch, 1991

Type species
- Hylella fleischmanni Boettger, 1893

Species
- 35 species (see text)

= Hyalinobatrachium =

Genus of amphibians

Hyalinobatrachium is a genus of glass frogs, family Centrolenidae. They are widely distributed in the Americas, from tropical Mexico to southeastern Brazil and Argentina.

== Taxonomy and systematics ==
The genus is currently defined to include Hyalinobatrachium fleischmanni and its closest relatives. Its sister taxon is Celsiella. Some species formerly in this genus are now in Vitreorana or Teratohyla.

== Description ==
Hyalinobatrachium have a bulbous liver covered by white pigment, a transparent parietal peritoneum, and lack a humeral spine in adult males. The bones are white in living animals. Males usually call from the underside of leaves. Females deposit one layer of eggs on the underside of leaves.

== Species ==
As of March 2022, these species are included in the genus:

- Hyalinobatrachium adespinosai Guayasamin, Vieira, Glor, and Hutter, 2019
- Hyalinobatrachium anachoretus Twomey, Delia, and Castroviejo-Fisher, 2014
- Hyalinobatrachium aureoguttatum (Barrera-Rodriguez and Ruiz-Carranza, 1989)
- Hyalinobatrachium bergeri (Cannatella, 1980)
- Hyalinobatrachium cappellei (Van Lidth de Jeude, 1904)
- Hyalinobatrachium carlesvilai Castroviejo-Fisher, Padial, Chaparro, Aguayo-Vedia, and De la Riva, 2009
- Hyalinobatrachium chirripoi (Taylor, 1958)
- Hyalinobatrachium colymbiphyllum (Taylor, 1949)
- Hyalinobatrachium dianae Kubicki, Salazar, and Puschendorf, 2015
- Hyalinobatrachium duranti (Rivero, 1985)
- Hyalinobatrachium esmeralda Ruiz-Carranza and Lynch, 1998
- Hyalinobatrachium fleischmanni (Boettger, 1893)
- Hyalinobatrachium fragile (Rivero, 1985)
- Hyalinobatrachium guairarepanense Señaris, 2001
- Hyalinobatrachium iaspidiense (Ayarzagüena, 1992)
- Hyalinobatrachium ibama Ruiz-Carranza and Lynch, 1998
- Hyalinobatrachium kawense Castroviejo-Fisher, Vilà, Ayarzagüena, Blanc, and Ernst, 2011
- Hyalinobatrachium mashpi Guayasamin, Brunner, Valencia-Aguilar, Franco-Mena, Ringler, Armijos, Morochz, Bustamante, Maynard & Culebras, 2022
- Hyalinobatrachium mesai Barrio-Amorós and Brewer-Carias, 2008
- Hyalinobatrachium mondolfii Señaris and Ayarzagüena, 2001
- Hyalinobatrachium muiraquitan Oliveira and Hernández-Ruz, 2017
- Hyalinobatrachium munozorum (Lynch and Duellman, 1973)
- Hyalinobatrachium nouns Guayasamin, Brunner, Valencia-Aguilar, Franco-Mena, Ringler, Armijos, Morochz, Bustamante, Maynard & Culebras, 2022
- Hyalinobatrachium orientale (Rivero, 1968)
- Hyalinobatrachium orocostale (Rivero, 1968)
- Hyalinobatrachium pallidum (Rivero, 1985)
- Hyalinobatrachium pellucidum (Lynch and Duellman, 1973)
- Hyalinobatrachium solaris (2025)
- Hyalinobatrachium talamancae (Taylor, 1952)
- Hyalinobatrachium tatayoi Castroviejo-Fisher, Ayarzagüena, and Vilà, 2007
- Hyalinobatrachium taylori (Goin, 1968)
- Hyalinobatrachium tricolor Castroviejo-Fisher, Vilà, Ayarzagüena, Blanc, and Ernst, 2011
- Hyalinobatrachium valerioi (Dunn, 1931)
- Hyalinobatrachium vireovittatum (Starrett and Savage, 1973)
- Hyalinobatrachium viridissimum (Taylor, 1942)
- Hyalinobatrachium yaku Guayasamin, Cisneros-Heredia, Maynard, Lynch, Culebras, and Hamilton, 2017
