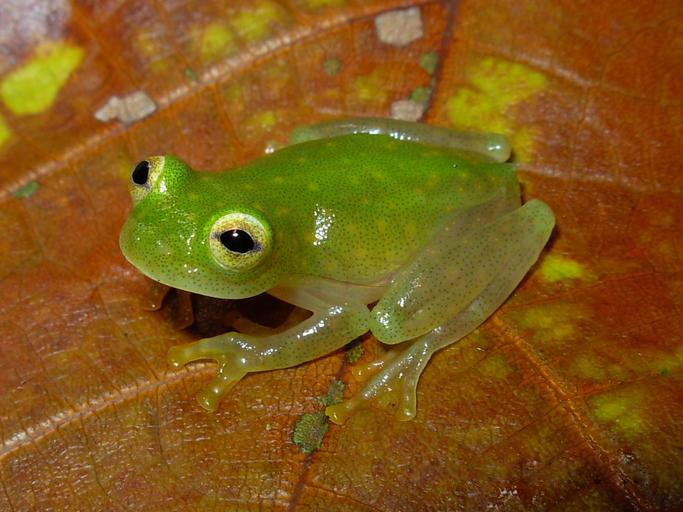

Conservation status
- Least Concern (IUCN 3.1)

Scientific classification
- Kingdom: Animalia
- Phylum: Chordata
- Class: Amphibia
- Order: Anura
- Family: Centrolenidae
- Genus: Hyalinobatrachium
- Species: H. fleischmanni

Binomial name
- Hyalinobatrachium fleischmanni (Boettger, 1893)

Synonyms
- Hylella fleischmanni Boettger, 1893; Hylella chrysops Cope, 1894; Centrolenella viridissima Taylor, 1942; Cochranella decorata Taylor, 1958; Cochranella millepunctata Taylor, 1958

= Hyalinobatrachium fleischmanni =

Species of amphibian

Hyalinobatrachium fleischmanni, also known as Fleischmann's glass frog or the northern glass frog, is a species of frog in the family Centrolenidae. It is found in the tropical Americas from southern Mexico to Ecuador. Specifically, these frogs occur in Mexico, Belize, Costa Rica, El Salvador, Guatemala, Honduras, Nicaragua, and Panama, Colombia, and Ecuador. It has often been confused with related species, and the exact distribution depends on the source. This frog tends to have green skin, pale yellowish spots, yellow fingertips and translucent skin covering its stomach.

== Etymology ==
The specific name fleischmanni honors Carl Fleischmann, a collector in Costa Rica in the 1890s.

== Description ==
H. fleischmanni are small and arboreal frogs that lives in lowland and mid-elevation forests of Central and South America. They call during the rainy season.

Glass frogs have similarities to tree frogs. They look very close to the naked eye except glass frog's eyes point forward and are golden. During the day, these frogs camouflage themselves under leaves but above water. Male glass frogs are 19–28 mm long, while females measure from 23–32 mm long. They have a green semi-translucent color with yellow translucent hands. Their skin has dots which matches that of the leaves in the area. When confronted or approached, they tend to freeze up and not move. They are carnivores and they eat small insects such as crickets, moths, flies, spiders, and even other smaller frogs. Also known as the Northern Glass Frog, this frog's physical features include primarily green skin, which also reflects visible light typically at 400 nm to 700 nm, pale yellowish spots, yellow fingertips and translucent skin covering its stomach. A sheet of guanine stretches over several internal organs, but leaves others parts such as the liver exposed for viewing as it only covers half of the frog's underbelly. They also possess a white vocal sac that can be used to produce sounds for mating. Male frogs have a noticeable hook protruding from its spine, presumably used to fight other frogs, or defend its territory or the eggs. They are fierce fighters who will occasionally engage in a wrestling matches with other intruding frogs. The female species are slightly larger and lacks this particular feature. There have been more than 100 reported glass frogs throughout Central and South America, and 13 species can be found in Costa Rica. Adults tend to be more active during the night when there is rain to keep their skin moist and from drying out. However, violent rainstorms have the potential to kill H. fleischmanni, as a simple direct shot from a raindrop has been observed to kill a glass frog.

== Habitat and distribution ==
Fleischmann's Glass Frogs live near fast streams, and these frogs usually inhabit forests up to 2,000 meters above sea level in Central and South America. They have a very wide geographic distribution from Mexico to Ecuador and Suriname and are one of the most altitudinal species of their genus (approximately sea level to above 1600 m). In Costa Rica, these frogs live in lowland wet forests, rain forests, and even in higher elevations. They do not like dry areas such as the northwestern lowlands, high mountains, or coasts. Of all the glass frogs in Costa Rica, Fleischmann's glass frogs are the most populous. The glass frogs are also arboreal, which means they reside in trees. These frogs tend to lay their eggs on lower branches, the bottom of leaves and near flowing water. About 18–30 eggs could be laid, and the male frog would stand guard over the eggs to protect them from predators until they hatch, and the tadpoles drop into the water.

=== Effects of vegetation on calling sites ===
According to some researchers, the calling site of male H. fleischmanni is sometimes found on plants with broad leaves that overhang rivers, and sometimes is found on the ventral side of horizontal (or near horizontal) leaves. These two different locations of calling sites have a large difference in how the vegetation will affect the propagation of sound.

Whether male frogs choose their own calling sites because of the acoustic properties of that calling site has not yet been explained, but related studies have clarified the relationship between vegetation and sound propagation. In fact, the difference in acoustic properties of the calling sites due to the physical characteristics of the environment indeed affects the success rate of courtship and territory protection. These calls are not intended to be directional, but vegetation and many other environmental factors helps to form directional, beaming-like calls. Research has shown that frogs who have their calling site more than 0.6 meters above the ground have an increased rate of attracting mates than their counterparts below 0.6 meters. A plausible explanation for this is that higher areas are relatively more open, while lower calling sites tend to have more complex vegetation coverage, thus causing the call to attenuate. By measuring and comparing the Sound Pressure Levels (SPL) of H. fleischmanni, a study elucidates the effect of vegetation on sound intensity and directionality. The results of the experiment showed that calling on the leaves did not bring any directional consistency.

Males on large leaves had a louder sound from the back, while males on small leaves had a significantly louder sound from the front. The pattern on the underside of the leaves was more consistent: at 50 and 100 cm, the sound in the front was always louder than that from the back, regardless of leaf size. The reason that calling below the leaf results in a directional sound in front is unclear, but it is presumed to be the effect of the angle between the frog's body and the leaf surface. The propagation of sound, on the other hand, is apparently attenuated by vegetation.

== Home range and territoriality ==
Male H. fleischmanni do not persist in their territory for long. Most males were found to stay in the same territory for about ten nights, and some for more than 15 to 20 days, generally falling within the range of 1 to 18 days. The frogs rarely defend their territory by overt aggression. The new territory will usually be within two meters of the original territory but occasionally as far as five meters.

There will usually be up to five clusters of eggs in a single territory. Males who occupy very large leaves usually stay on the same leaf after eggs are laid and continue to attract other females; males that occupy the small leaves commonly move to another leaf on the same plant.

A common calling site for males is observed to be the undersurfaces of broad-leaved plants such as Dieffenbachia, or shrubs, ground bromeliads, and epiphytes on tree trunks, all of which are around 0.5 to 10 meters above the ground. Male also tries to find a place over the main stream channel, thus the calling site is usually close to the water, about 0 to 6 meters.

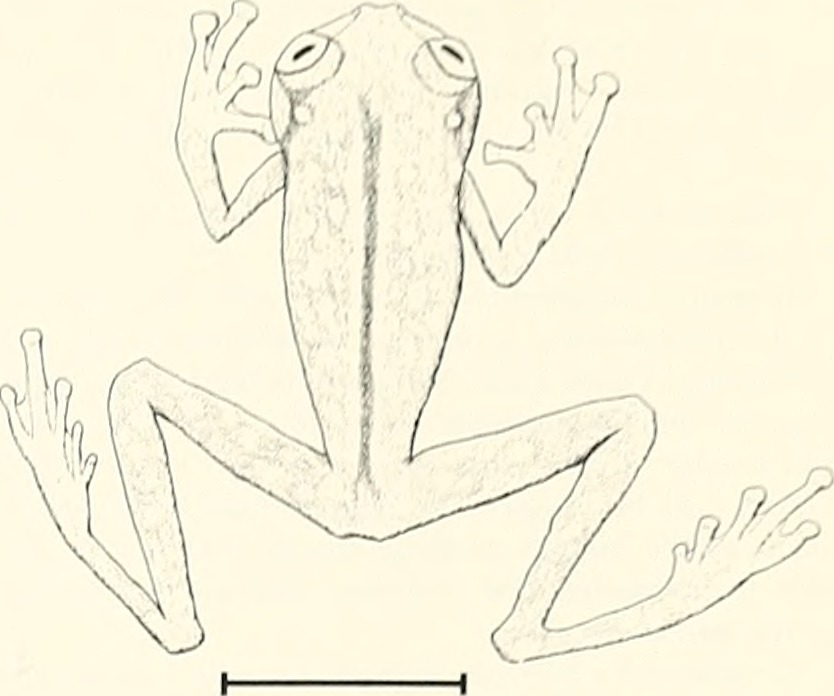
Used to be called Centrolenella fleischmanni

== Reproduction and life cycle ==
Male H. fleischmanni call under the leaves and their calling usually begins at dusk, sometimes lasts until the dawn, and decreases calling as the night progresses. However, whenever males are participating in amplexus or attending eggs, they do not call. While conspicuous vocalization helps male H. fleischmanni attract female individuals, it also increases their risk of exposure to predators.

The glass frog's reproduction cycle begins during the rainy season. From May to September, which is the breeding season of the H. fleischmanii frogs, females H. fleischmanni will constantly appear for mating. Female H. fleischmannis stop moving around vegetation close to calling male frogs. The female will then gently push on the male from the side and crawl under them, after that the male frog will clasp the female frog. That is the process of amplexus. Female H. fleischmanni prefer to lay their eggs on overhanging leaves by the river. The number of eggs is dependent on the time of year they are laid. Due to the large number of its natural predators, roughly 80% of the clutches are eaten and/or destroyed. For instance, some risks the eggs face are infections by fungus, or being eaten by larger predators such as crickets and possums. The hatched tadpoles will fall into the river and stay in the silt at the bottom of the river. The male frog takes precautions to keep his eggs safe, such as remaining at the clutch to guard them, or urinating on the eggs to ensure that they do not dry out. The eggs hatch after approximately 10–15 days. The tadpoles that fall into the water usually remain hidden in debris at the bottom of the stream. Their growth is time-consuming, and it takes between 1–2 years for the tadpoles to fully mature. Full gestation time, from egg laying to hatching, spans approximately 8 to 21 days. All the tadpoles in the clutch hatch within a day, but the tadpoles disappear within 2–3 days. The development of tadpoles will show a series of color changes. They go from yellow to orange to red, and hatching occurs almost exclusively in the orange or red stage. The yellow tadpoles may not be able to survive on their own, so the disappearance of the yellow tadpoles is most likely due to predators. However, when the tadpoles reached the orange stage on the eighth and ninth days, they will have enough ability to survive on their own.

== Mating ==
Female H. fleischmanni lay and deposit eggs close to the calling site so they can be defended by males. Male attend to eggs by returning to the same calling site in succession and fertilizing the eggs of several females. If it's a dry night, the entire population will become inactive. The advertisement call of males are peeps between 4300 o 5300 Hz, around 0.1 seconds long, and 4 to 10 calls per minute, with no dominant frequency. A single peep will last about 0.4 seconds, which is then termed as a mew when a male discovers other frogs in his territory; this is called the encounter call.

=== Male-male interaction ===
Most of the time, calls are from the resident frog instead of the insider frog; physical contacts are uncommon.

During mating season, the males would call out to the females, and once a relationship has been established, the highly territorial males would display another call to warn competitors away. Should any potential threats not back away, the frogs would fight until a winner is determined. The victor would be able to reproduce with the female.

Male frogs have a noticeable hook protruding from its spine, presumably used to fight other frogs, or defend its territory or the eggs. They are fierce fighters who will occasionally engage in a wrestling matches with other intruding frogs. The female species are slightly larger and lacks this particular feature.

=== Male-female interaction ===
During the process of amplexus, males are stationary for most of the time, which means they rarely start the amplexus. When entering the calling site of a male individual, a female will move up, down, and to the edge of the site while staring at the ground. The female will then continue to circle the male in a low, flattened posture. When the male detects the existence of the female, generally different types of calls will be given during the courtship. First, they will start with a mew interspersed with a shorter mew than the usual mew. Next, the male will exhibit the 0.1 second long chip call when male and female come to the surface of a leaf. If another female approaches, females won't interact with each other. The late female will stop and find another calling male if the original male clasps the first female.

== Parental care ==
Males' involvement in parental care occurs at the stage of egg attendance. They assume a ventral contact by brooding, rotating, and manipulating the jelly of the clutch. Males manipulate the eggs in several ways, such as grasping the clutch from near the periphery and using their four limbs to pull the clutch and then release it. Males also use their hindlimbs to stoke the jelly.

== Enemies ==
A fringe-lipped bat, Trachops cirrhosus, is known to focus its attention on calling H. fleischmanni frogs. Some other organisms were also found to predate on H. fleischmanni: Prionostemma frontale, a species of Phalangids, has been found to predate H. fleischmannini during the pre-hatching stages of the frog. P. frontale will use their chelicerae to slice the jelly that contains the pre-hatch. They will then take out the embryos or eggs from the jelly while the post-hatching capsule looks like it has not been disturbed from the pre-hatching jelly. Moreover, Cupiennus was observed to be a predator of H. fleischmanni as well.

== Protective coloration ==
In a 1991 study, it was found that H. fleischmanni reflecting near-infrared rays from 700 to 900 nm under infrared color photography detection, despite their own green skin, reflects visible light typically at 400 to 700 nm. Therefore, when they rest on photosynthetic leaf surfaces that also reflect infrared light, they are virtually indistinguishable both in visible light and near-infrared light ranges. Two functions were thought to be the reason for this discovery, although neither have been confirmed. One hypothesis is that the skin provides thermoregulative properties. Frogs keep their bodies warm because skin absorption causes protons of these wavelengths (near-infrared wavelengths) to lose energy as heat. In other words, heat is absorbed by the skin. Reflectance of infrared light by H. fleischmanni represents the ability to prevent extra heat gain.The second possibility is an improvement of cryptic coloration developed to avoid those predators with infrared receptors. Some animals, such as birds and snakes, have a presence in their bodies that helps them increase their sensitivity to near-infrared rays at night. For instance, snakes have TRPA1 in their pit organ which is an ion channel that works as the infrared receptor controlling the flux of calcium ions. This type of receptor gives snakes the ability to detect infrared light and this ability is often called "heat vision". If the frog's skin simply reflects visible green light, then green frogs on green leaves can still be spotted by these particular predators. Therefore, when the environment also reflects infrared light, H. fleischmanni can hind into the background even if the predators have such infrared receptors.

At the same time, purple pigments were also found in their chromatophore, but the main function is still unclear.

== Phylogeny ==
Data show that H. fleischmanni originated in North and South America. Comprise sister species Hyalinobatrachium tatayoi and individuals from Colombia, Ecuador, and Panama in the first clade; individuals from Costa Rica, Nicaragua, and eastern Honduras make up the second clade. The first two clades have no obvious structure, but the third clade, which includes individuals from western Honduras, Guatemala, and Mexico, showed a deep population structure. Known geographic regions indicated their effectiveness in differentiating H. fleischmanni into three apparently isolated clades by working as a barrier to dispersal. Sea level and climate oscillations during the Pleistocene also had a strong influence on the structure and population of the glass frog clade.

== Interactions with humans and livestock ==
Artificial affections on environmental interventions may promote the growth of algae and bacteria in streams. H. fleischmanni larvae readily feed on this resource.

Moreover, natural or anthropogenic environmental noise can mask the acoustic signals produced by animals. A large part of the colony of the glass frog Hyalinobatrachium fleischmanni (Centrolenidae) overlaps with noisy urban areas, which affects the species' acoustic communication. By studying the relationship between changes in anthropogenic noise levels throughout the night in areas of different noise level and the diurnal acoustic variations of acoustic activity within sites of H. fleischmanni, the noise level and the acoustic activity of H. fleischmanni varied throughout the night. The acoustic activity of H. fleischmanni was found to be different in noisy sites than in sites with lower noise levels. The highest acoustic activity was found at the less noisy sites throughout the sampling period.

== Sources ==
- Hayes, Marc Philip (1991). A Study of Clutch Attendance in the Neotropical Frog Centrolenella Fleischmanni (Anura: Centrolenidae) (Thesis). OCLC 26832256.
