= Juan Manuel Guayasamin =

Juan Manuel Guayasamin (born 1974) is an Ecuadorian biologist.

== Career ==
Guayasamin earned his Ph.D. in 2007 from the University of Kansas, Department of Ecology and Evolutionary Biology. Since 2017 he has been working as a professor at the Universidad San Francisco de Quito in Ecuador. His research interests include the evolution of glass frogs (family Centrolenidae), direct-developing anurans, and ecosystem conservation. His main contributions have been: phylogenetic taxonomy of glassfrogs, description of the variation of skin texture in frogs, description of numerous species of amphibians and reptiles, a monographic review of all Ecuadorian glassfrogs (60 species), studies an amazonian diversity and connectivity, and on amphibians diseases (chytrid fungus). A team led by Guayasamin discovered Hyalinobatrachium yaku in May 2017, a glassfrog with a transparent venter. As of 2026, he had described seven genera of amphibians, 73 species of amphibians, and 15 species of reptiles, including two geckos from the Galápagos Islands. He directs the USFQ´s Tandayapa Cloud Forest Station.

== Genera described ==
- Celsiella Guayasamin et al., 2009
- Chimerella Guayasamin et al., 2009
- Espadarana Guayasamin et al., 2009
- Ikakogi Guayasamin et al., 2009
- Rulyrana Guayasamin et al., 2009
- Sachatamia Guayasamin et al., 2009
- Vitreorana Guayasamin et al., 2009

== Selected publications ==
- Guayasamin JM, Castroviejo-Fisher S, Ayarzagüena J, Trueb L, Vilà C (2008). "Phylogenetic relationships of glassfrogs (Centrolenidae) based on mitochondrial and nuclear genes". Molecular Phylogenetics and Evolution 48 (2): 574–595.
- Guayasamin JM, Castroviejo-Fisher S, Trueb L, Ayarzagüena J, Rada M, Vilà C (2009). "Phylogenetic systematics of Glassfrogs (Amphibia: Centrolenidae) and their sister taxon Allophryne ruthveni ". Zootaxa 2100: 1–97.
- Vences M, Guayasamin JM, Miralles A, De la Riva I (2013). "To name or not to name: Criteria to promote economy of change in Linnaean classification schemes". Zootaxa 3636 (2): 201–244.
- Guayasamin JM, Krynak T, Krynak K, Culebras J, Hutter CR (2015). "Phenotypic plasticity raises questions for taxonomically important traits: a remarkable new Andean rainfrog (Pristimantis) with the ability to change skin texture". Zoological Journal of the Linnean Society 173: 913–928.
- Arteaga A, Bustamante L, Vieira J, Tapia W, Guayasamin JM (2019). Reptiles of the Galápagos: Life on the Enchanted Islands. Quito: Tropical Herping. 208 pp.
- Guayasamin JM, Cisneros-Heredia DF, McDiarmid RW, Peña P, Hutter CR (2020). "Glassfrog of Ecuador: diversity, evolution, and conservation". Diversity 12 (222): 1–285. (doi:10.3390/d12060222).
