= Hyalinobatrachium talamancae =

Talamanca glass frog

Conservation status
- Least Concern (IUCN 3.1)

Scientific classification
- Kingdom: Animalia
- Phylum: Chordata
- Class: Amphibia
- Order: Anura
- Family: Centrolenidae
- Genus: Hyalinobatrachium
- Species: H. talamancae

Binomial name
- Hyalinobatrachium talamancae (Taylor, 1952)

Synonyms
- Cochranella talamancae Taylor, 1952; Centrolenella talamancae (Taylor, 1952)

Species of amphibian

Hyalinobatrachium talamancae is a species of frog in the family Centrolenidae. It is endemic to the Limón Province, Costa Rica. Its common name is Talamanca glass frog. Its natural habitats are premontane wet forests. It is a regularly seen frog in suitable habitat.
