= Diego F. Cisneros-Heredia =

Ecuadorian herpetologist (born 1980)

- Born: Diego Francisco Cisneros Heredia; 1980 (age 45–46); Quito, Ecuador
- Education: King's College London (Ph.D. in Geography)
- Years active: 2002–present
- Awards: Matilde Hidalgo Award as the Graduate Researcher with the Greatest Contribution to Science (2017); "Wings Across the Americas International Cooperation" award, U.S. Forest Service (2008)

Diego F. Cisneros-Heredia (born 1980 in Quito, Ecuador) is an Ecuadorian biologist who works on taxonomy and natural history of different groups of animals and on biodiversity conservation.

== Biography ==
He grew up in Quito, Ecuador. From an early age he was interested in natural history, collecting data on the breeding of some Ecuadorian birds from the age of 10, which he later published in scientific articles, and finding individuals of a new frog species when he was 17.

In 2002 he was part of the Research Training Program of the National Museum of Natural History, United States (Smithsonian Institution), where he worked under the supervision of the renowned herpetologist Roy Wallace McDiarmid. He did his undergraduate studies at Universidad San Francisco de Quito USFQ (Ecuador), where he earned a Licentiate in Applied Ecology in 2006, followed by a Master's degree in Environmental Monitoring and Management in 2008. He earned his Doctorate (PhD) in Geography at King's College London (United Kingdom) with a dissertation entitled "Spatial patterns and impact of habitat change on the vertebrate diversity of north-western South America".

He is a full professor at the Universidad San Francisco de Quito USFQ, where he is director of the Museum of Zoology. He is a research associate of the Instituto Nacional de Biodiversidad INABIO and a member of several specialist commissions on various groups of animals of the International Union for Conservation of Nature (IUCN).

Cisneros-Heredia has researched throughout his career various topics in systematics, natural history, ecology and biogeography of different groups of animals (birds, amphibians, reptiles and invertebrates) in the Neotropics, being the first Ecuadorian to describe a new genus of vertebrate (Nymphargus), and having published more than 100 scientific articles and book chapters.

== Awards ==
- Matilde Hidalgo Award as the Graduate Researcher with the Greatest Contribution to Science (2017).
- "Wings Across the Americas International Cooperation" award, U.S. Forest Service, (International Cooperation Award: Cerulean Warbler Nonbreeding Habitat Assessment) (2008)

== Described taxa ==
New taxa of amphibians (Amphibia)

1. Nymphargus Cisneros-Heredia & McDiarmid, 2007
2. Pristimantis aureolineatus (Guayasamin, Ron, Cisneros-Heredia, Lamar, & McCracken, 2006)
3. Boana nympha (Faivovich, Moravec, Cisneros-Heredia, & Köhler, 2006)
4. Chimerella mariaelenae (Cisneros-Heredia & McDiarmid, 2006)
5. Cochranella erminea Torres-Gastello, Suárez-Segovia, and Cisneros-Heredia, 2007
6. Espadarana durrellorum (Cisneros-Heredia, 2007)
7. Nymphargus buenaventura (Cisneros-Heredia and Yánez-Muñoz, 2007)
8. Nymphargus laurae Cisneros-Heredia and McDiarmid, 2007
9. Teratohyla amelie (Cisneros-Heredia and Meza-Ramos, 2007)
10. Rulyrana mcdiarmidi (Cisneros-Heredia, Venegas, Rada, and Schulte, 2008)
11. Centrolene condor Cisneros-Heredia and Morales-Mite, 2008
12. Teratohyla sornozai Cisneros-Heredia, Yánez-Muñoz, and Ortega-Andrade, 2009
13. Pristimantis loujosti Yánez-Muñoz, Cisneros-Heredia, and Reyes-Puig, 2010
14. Pristimantis romanorum Yánez-Muñoz, Meza-Ramos, Cisneros-Heredia, and Reyes-Puig, 2010
15. Pristimantis sirnigeli Yánez-Muñoz, Meza-Ramos, Cisneros-Heredia, and Reyes-Puig, 2010
16. Pristimantis tungurahua Reyes-Puig, Yánez-Muñoz, Cisneros-Heredia, and Rámírez-Jaramillo, 2010
17. Pristimantis yumbo Yánez-Muñoz, Meza-Ramos, Cisneros-Heredia, and Reyes-Puig, 2010
18. Osornophryne angel Yánez-Muñoz, Altamirano-Benavides, Cisneros-Heredia, and Gluesenkamp, 2010
19. Osornophryne occidentalis Cisneros-Heredia and Gluesenkamp, 2010
20. Epipedobates darwinwallacei Cisneros-Heredia & Yánez-Muñoz, 2010
21. Rhaebo ecuadorensis Mueses-Cisneros, Cisneros-Heredia, and McDiarmid, 2012
22. Hyalinobatrachium yaku Guayasamin, Cisneros-Heredia, Maynard, Lynch, Culebras, and Hamilton, 2017
23. Pristimantis erythros Sánchez-Nivicela, Celi-Piedra, Posse-Sarmiento, Urgilés, Yánez-Muñoz, & Cisneros-Heredia, 2018
24. Pristimantis andinogigas Yánez-Muñoz, Veintimilla-Yánez, Batallas-R., & Cisneros-Heredia, 2019
25. Pristimantis mallii Reyes-Puig, Reyes-Puig, Velarde-Garcéz, Dávalos, Mancero, Navarrete, Yánez-Muñoz, Cisneros-Heredia, and Ron, 2019
26. Nymphargus manduriacu Guayasamin, Cisneros-Heredia, Vieira, Kohn, Gavilanes, Lynch, Hamilton, and Maynard, 2019
27. Nymphargus humboldti Guayasamin, Cisneros-Heredia, McDiarmid, and Hutter in Guayasamin, Cisneros-Heredia, McDiarmid, Peña, and Hutter, 2020
28. Oedipina ecuatoriana Reyes-Puig, Wake, Kotharambath, Streicher, Koch, Cisneros-Heredia, Yánez-Muñoz, and Ron, 2020
29. Oedipina villamizariorum Reyes-Puig, Wake, Kotharambath, Streicher, Koch, Cisneros-Heredia, Yánez-Muñoz, and Ron, 2020
30. Hyloscirtus conscientia Yánez-Muñoz, Reyes-Puig, Batallas-Revelo, Broaddus, Urgilés-Merchán, Cisneros-Heredia, and Guayasamin, 2021
31. Phyllonastes mindo (Reyes-Puig, Guayasamin, Koch, Brito-Zapata, Hollanders, Costales & Cisneros-Heredia, 2021)
32. Pristimantis daquilemai Brito-Zapata, Reyes-Puig, Cisneros-Heredia, Zumel & Ron, 2021
33. Hyloscirtus sethmacfarlanei Reyes-Puig, Recalde, Recalde, Koch, Guayasamin, Cisneros-Heredia, Jost & Yánez-Muñoz, 2022
34. Hyloscirtus tolkieni Sánchez-Nivicela, Falcón-Reibán & Cisneros-Heredia, 2023
35. Centrolene camposi Cisneros-Heredia, Yánez-Muñoz, Sánchez-Nivicela & Ron, 2023
36. Centrolene ericsmithi Cisneros-Heredia, Yánez-Muñoz, Sánchez-Nivicela & Ron, 2023
37. Centrolene kutuku Ron, García, Brito-Zapata, Reyes-Puig, Figueroa-Coronel & Cisneros-Heredia, 2024
38. Phyllonastes arutam (Brito-Zapata, Chávez-Reyes, Pallo-Robles, Carrión-Olmedo, Cisneros-Heredia & Reyes-Puig, 2024)
39. Phyllonastes cerrogolondrinas Ortega, Cisneros-Heredia, Camper, Romero-Carvajal, Negrete & Ron, 2025
40. Phyllonastes ecuadorensis Ortega, Cisneros-Heredia, Camper, Romero-Carvajal, Negrete & Ron, 2025
41. Phyllonastes dicaprioi Ortega, Cisneros-Heredia, Camper, Romero-Carvajal, Negrete & Ron, 2025
42. Phyllonastes macuma Ortega, Cisneros-Heredia, Camper, Romero-Carvajal, Negrete & Ron, 2025
43. Phyllonastes plateadensis Ortega, Cisneros-Heredia, Camper, Romero-Carvajal, Negrete & Ron, 2025
44. Phyllonastes sardinayacu Ortega, Cisneros-Heredia, Camper, Romero-Carvajal, Negrete & Ron, 2025
45. Urkuphryne Ortega, Cisneros-Heredia, Camper, Romero-Carvajal, Negrete & Ron, 2025
46. Urkuphryne merinoi Ortega, Cisneros-Heredia, Camper, Romero-Carvajal, Negrete & Ron, 2025
47. Osornophryne backshalli Reyes-Puig, Urgiles-Merchán, Ortega-Andrade, Cisneros-Heredia, Carrión-Olmedo & Yánez-Muñoz, 2025
48. Nymphargus dajomesae Masache-Sarango, Cisneros-Heredia, Ron, 2026

New taxa of reptiles (Reptilia)

1. Atractus touzeti Schargel, Lamar, Passos, Valencia, Cisneros-Heredia, & Campbell, 2013
2. Atractus cerberus Arteaga, Mebert, Valencia, Cisneros-Heredia, Peñafiel, Reyes-Puig, Vieira-Fernandes & Guayasamin, 2017
3. Atractus esepe Arteaga, Mebert, Valencia, Cisneros-Heredia, Peñafiel, Reyes-Puig, Vieira-Fernandes, & Guayasamin, 2017
4. Atractus pyroni Arteaga, Mebert, Valencia, Cisneros-Heredia, Peñafiel, Reyes-Puig, Vieira-Fernandes, & Guayasamin, 2017
5. Dipsas bobridgelyi Arteaga, Salazar-Valenzuela, Mebert, Peñafiel, Aguiar, Sánchez-Nivicela, Pyron, Colston, Cisneros-Heredia, Yánez-Muñoz, Venegas, Guayasamin, & Torres-Carvajal, 2018
6. Dipsas georgejetti Arteaga, Salazar-Valenzuela, Mebert, Peñafiel, Aguiar, Sánchez-Nivicela, Pyron, Colston, Cisneros-Heredia, Yánez-Muñoz, Venegas, Guayasamin, & Torres-Carvajal, 2018
7. Dipsas klebbai Arteaga, Salazar-Valenzuela, Mebert, Peñafiel, Aguiar, Sánchez-Nivicela, Pyron, Colston, Cisneros-Heredia, Yánez-Muñoz, Venegas, Guayasamin, & Torres-Carvajal, 2018
8. Dipsas oswaldobaezi Arteaga, Salazar-Valenzuela, Mebert, Peñafiel, Aguiar, Sánchez-Nivicela, Pyron, Colston, Cisneros-Heredia, Yánez-Muñoz, Venegas, Guayasamin, & Torres-Carvajal, 2018
9. Sibon bevridgelyi Arteaga, Salazar-Valenzuela, Mebert, Peñafiel, Aguiar, Sánchez-Nivicela, Pyron, Colston, Cisneros-Heredia, Yánez-Muñoz, Venegas, Guayasamin, & Torres-Carvajal, 2018

New taxa of spiders (Araneae)

1. Taczanowskia onowoka Jordán, Domínguez-Trujillo, & Cisneros-Heredia, 2021
2. Linothele cornigera Peñaherrera-R., Guerrero-Campoverde, León-E., Pinos-Sánchez & Cisneros-Heredia, 2023
3. Sadala rauli Peñaherrera-R. & Cisneros-Heredia, 2023
4. Pamphobeteus amazonas Sherwood, Gabriel, Peñaherrera-R., Cisneros-Heredia, León-E., Brescovit & Lucas, 2023
5. Pamphobeteus gangotenai Cisneros-Heredia, Peñaherrera-R., León-E., Sherwood, Gabriel, Brescovit & Lucas, 2023
6. Pamphobeteus jamacoaque Peñaherrera-R., Cisneros-Heredia, León-E., Sherwood, Gabriel, Brescovit & Lucas, 2023
7. Pamphobeteus lasjuntas Peñaherrera-R., Cisneros-Heredia, León-E., Sherwood, Gabriel, Brescovit & Lucas, 2023
8. Pamphobeteus matildeae Sherwood, Gabriel, Peñaherrera-R., Cisneros-Heredia, León-E., Brescovit & Lucas, 2023
9. Pamphobeteus skis León-E., Peñaherrera-R., Cisneros-Heredia, Sherwood, Gabriel, Brescovit & Lucas, 2023
10. Abdomegaphobema Sherwood, Gabriel, Peñaherrera-R., León-E., Cisneros-Heredia, Brescovit & Lucas, 2023
11. Eutichurus tendetza Peñaherrera-R., Guerrero-Campoverde, Guerrero-Molina & Cisneros-Heredia, 2024
12. Romopelma Peñaherrera-R., Pinos-Sánchez, Guerrero-Campoverde, León-E. & Cisneros-Heredia, 2024
13. Romopelma barrigae Peñaherrera-R., Pinos-Sánchez, Guerrero-Campoverde, León-E. & Cisneros-Heredia, 2024
14. Neischnocolus moraspungo Cisneros-Heredia, Peñaherrera-R., Guerrero-Campoverde, León-E., Gabriel & Sherwood, 2025
15. Neischnocolus samonellaacademy Peñaherrera-R., León-E., Guerrero-Campoverde, Gabriel, Sherwood & Cisneros-Heredia, 2025
16. Neischnocolus tiputini Guerrero-Campoverde, Peñaherrera-R., León-E., Gabriel, Sherwood & Cisneros-Heredia, 2025
17. Reversopelma spinometatarsi Peñaherrera-R., Mora-Bolaños, Guerrero-Campoverde, León-E., Ríos-Tamayo, Gabriel, Sherwood & Cisneros-Heredia, 2025
18. Vitriemboli Peñaherrera-R., Ríos-Tamayo, Sherwood, Gabriel, Guerrero-Campoverde, León-E., Mora-Bo-laños & Cisneros-Heredia, 2025
19. Vitriemboli diaguita Ríos-Tamayo, Peñaherrera-R., Sherwood, Guerrero-Campoverde, León-E., Mora-Bolaños, Gabriel & Cisneros-Heredia, 2025
20. Colombiarachne Sherwood, Gabriel, Peñaherrera-R., Guerrero-Campoverde, León-E., Mora-Bolaños, Ríos-Tamayo & Cisneros-Heredia, 2025
21. Psalmopoeus drolshageni Sherwood, Gabriel, Peñaherrera-R., Guerrero-Campoverde, León-E., Falcón-Reibán, Fajardo-Torres, Picón-Rentería & Cisneros-Heredia, 2025
22. Psalmopoeus wallacea Sherwood, Gabriel, Peñaherrera-R., Guerrero-Campoverde, León-E., Falcón-Reibán, Fajardo-Torres, Picón-Rentería & Cisneros-Heredia, 2025
23. Psalmopoeus zombie Sherwood, Peñaherrera-R., Gabriel, Guerrero-Campoverde, León-E., Falcón-Reibán, Fajardo-Torres, Picón-Rentería & Cisneros-Heredia, 2025
24. Tapinauchenius dayuma Peñaherrera-R., Guerrero-Campoverde, León-E., Falcón-Reibán, Fajardo-Torres, Picón-Rentería, Gabriel, Sherwood & Cisneros-Heredia, 2025
25. Tapinauchenius montufari Peñaherrera-R., Guerrero-Campoverde, León-E., Falcón-Reibán, Fajardo-Torres, Picón-Rentería, Gabriel, Sherwood & Cisneros-Heredia, 2025

New taxa of velvet worms (Onychophora)

1. Oroperipatus tiputini Montalvo-Salazar, Bejarano, Valarezo & Cisneros-Heredia, 2024

New taxa of insects (Insecta)

1. Totoia recki López-García, Domínguez-Trujillo & Cisneros-Heredia, 2024

== Eponymous taxa ==
- Pristimantis cisnerosi Reyes-Puig, Yánez-Muñoz, Ortega, and Ron, 2020
- Neischnocolus cisnerosi Peñaherrera-R., Guerrero-Campoverde, León-E., Pinos-Sánchez & Falcón-Reibán, 2023
