= Cochranella erminea =

Conservation status
- Least Concern (IUCN 3.1)

Scientific classification
- Kingdom: Animalia
- Phylum: Chordata
- Class: Amphibia
- Order: Anura
- Family: Centrolenidae
- Genus: Cochranella
- Species: C. erminea

Binomial name
- Cochranella erminea Torres-Gastello, Suárez-Segovia, and Cisneros-Heredia, 2007

Synonyms
- Rulyrana erminea Guayasamin, Castroviejo-Fisher, Trueb, Ayarzagüena, Rada, and Vilà, 2009

Species of amphibian

Cochranella erminea is a species of frog in the family Centrolenidae. It is green, and has flat warts, white and dark blue spots, and green bones. The species is endemic to Peru.

Cochranella erminea was described in 2007, and is listed as of Least Concern by the IUCN.

== Taxonomy ==
Cochranella erminea was described in 2007, by Claudia P. Torres-Gastello, Juana Suárez-Segovia, and Diego F. Cisneros-Heredia. The holotype is a female. The type locality is in the Sabetari stream, Junín, Peru.

== Distribution ==
Cochranella erminea is endemic to Peru. It is present at elevations of 349–923 metres (1,145–3,028 ft). The species' estimated extent of occurrence is 120,410 square kilometres (46,490 sq mi).

Cochranella erminea is found in a variety of habitats, including primary premontane forests, disturbed foothills, and near streams and waterfalls. It may be found in the canopy during non-reproductive periods.

The species is syntopic with Pristimantis buccinator, Rhinella margaritifera, Ameerega macero, Pristimantis toftae, Pristimantis ventrimarmoratus, and Oreobates quixensis.

== Description ==
The female holotype measured 23.6 millimetres (0.93 in) in snout-vent length. The back is green, with flat warts. The warts have white and dark blue spots. The dorsal skin is shagreened.

The tympanum is ovoid. The vomer has teeth. The snout is sloping anteroventrally, and rounded dorsally. The nostrils are slightly elevated. The upper lip is white. The iris is pale or slate grey, with darker grey lines.

The prepollex is concealed, and the outer fingers and toes have abundant melanophores.

The bones are green. The parietal peritoneum and pericardium are white. The other visceral peritonea are transparent.

== Conservation ==
In 2017, the IUCN assessed Cochranella erminea as of Least Concern. The species faces no major threats, though pesticide runoff may be a localised threat. It is present in the Machiguenga Communal Reserve.

== Etymology ==
The specific epithet erminea is derived from the Latin ermineus, meaning "white like ermine". It refers to the white warts on the frog's back.
