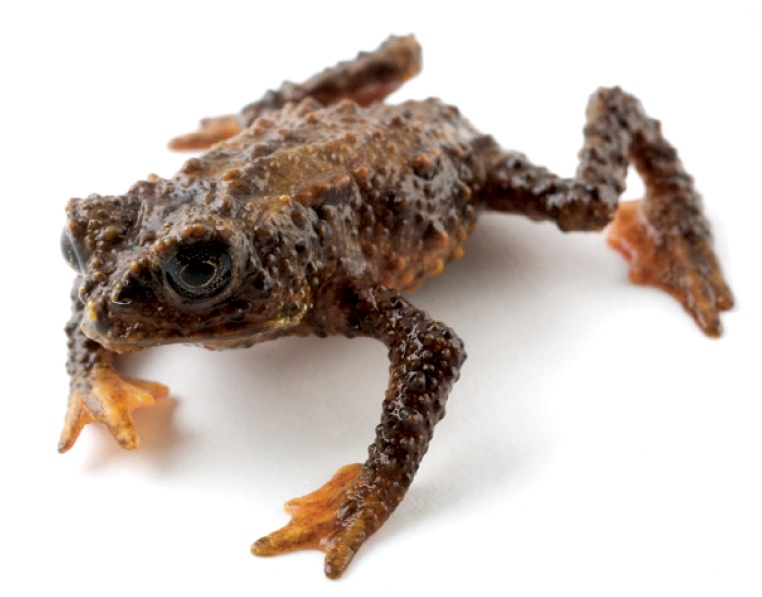
- Male holotype

Conservation status
- Endangered (IUCN 3.1)

Scientific classification
- Kingdom: Animalia
- Phylum: Chordata
- Class: Amphibia
- Order: Anura
- Family: Bufonidae
- Genus: Osornophryne
- Species: O. simpsoni

Binomial name
- Osornophryne simpsoni Páez-Moscoso, Guayasamin & Yánez-Muñoz, 2011
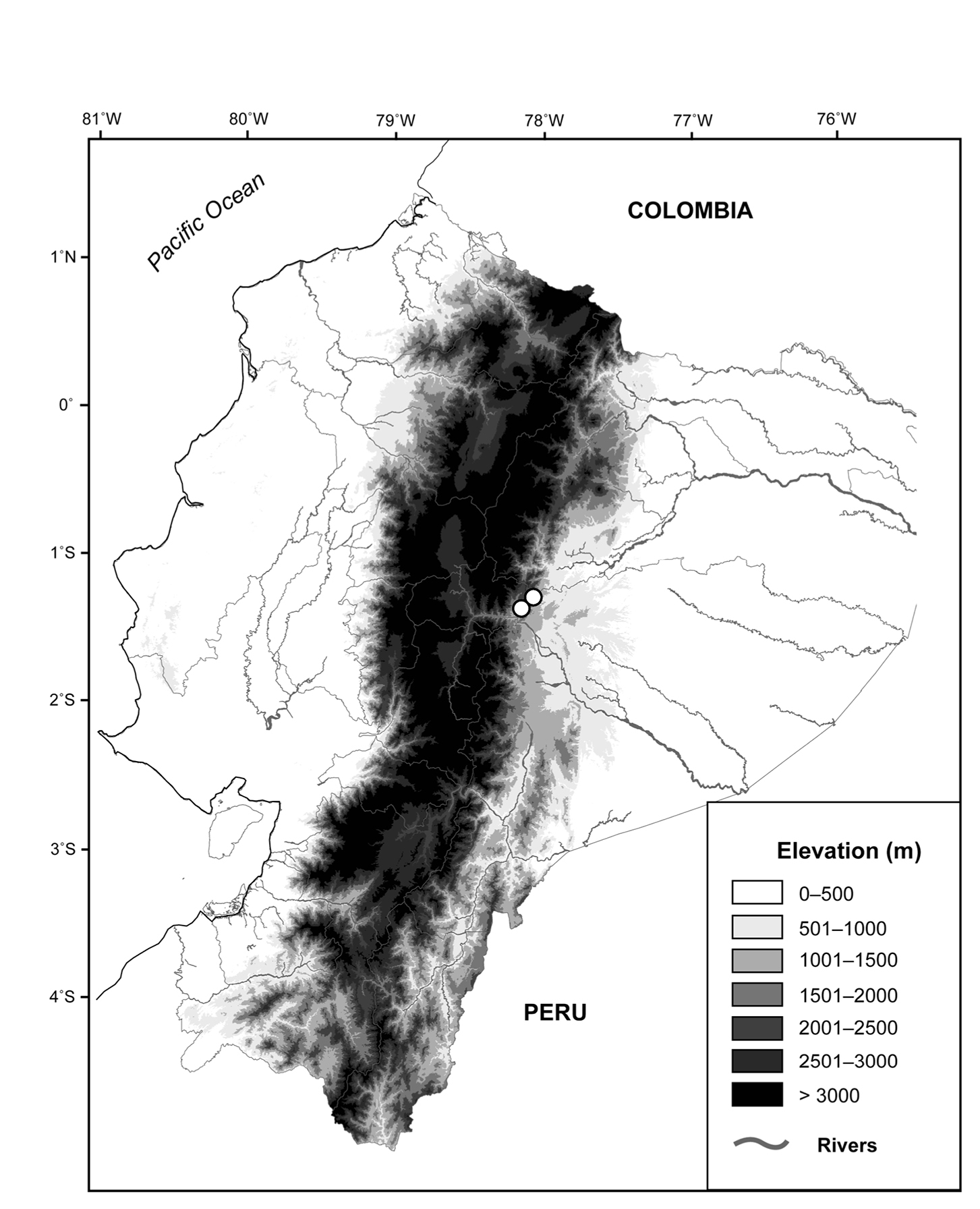
- Distribution in Ecuador (white dots)

= Osornophryne simpsoni =

Species of amphibian

Osornophryne simpsoni, commonly known as Simpson's toadlet, or Simpson’s plumb toad is a species of true toad. It is endemic to the montane cloud forests of Ecuador, and is known from three locations.

The species was described in 2011. The frogs are orange or dark brown. Males and females differ in colour and size. The species is nocturnal and semi-arboreal.

Osornophryne simpsoni is endangered, and faces habitat loss. The species was named after Nigel Simpson.

== Distribution ==
Osornophryne simpsoni is endemic to Ecuador. The species is found at elevations of 2,039–2,187 metres (6,690–7,175 ft). Its extent of occurrence is 1,262 square kilometres (487 sq mi). The species is present near Llanganates National Park.

It occurs in montane cloud forests, dominated by Clusia trees, in the Cordillera Real chain. Individuals have been found on bromeliads and ferns.

When first described in 2011, the species was known from two locations. In 2021, it was found in a third location.

The holotype was collected in Ecuador's Pastaza Province.

== Taxonomy ==
Osornophryne simpsoni was described in 2011. It is a sister species of Osornophryne occidentalis.

O. simpsoni has two distinct lineages, which are morphologically similar, but differ in size.

== Description ==
The maximum snout-vent length of Osornophryne simpsoni is 2.6 centimetres (1.0 in) in males, and 3.2 centimetres (1.3 in) in females. The back and flanks have numerous warts. In females, the underside is mostly smooth.

The back is orange-brown in males, and dark brown in females, with some paler patches. The snout and flanks are orange and yellow. The throat is yellow, with darker markings. The iris is black, and surrounded by a gold ring.

Morphologically, Osornophryne simpsoni is most similar to O. guacamayo. Unlike most species of Osornophryne, the fourth and fifth toes of O simpsoni are elongated.

O. simpsoni is nocturnal and semi-arboreal. When manipulated by humans, the toad escapes slowly, and falls into a ball position. It is thought to undergo direct development.

== Conservation ==
In 2021, the IUCN classified Osornophryne simpsoni as endangered. The species is at risk from habitat loss, and occurs in three threat-defined locations. It may be affected by climate change, as it occurs at restricted altitudes.

The species is thought to be common in its range, though the population may be declining.

== Etymology ==
Osornophryne simpsoni is named after Dr Nigel Simpson, recognising his support for the conservation of Andean cloud forests.
