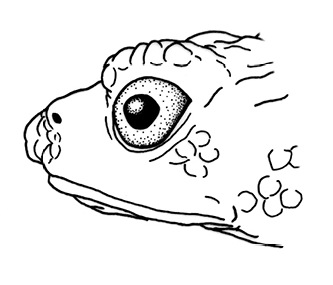
- Male
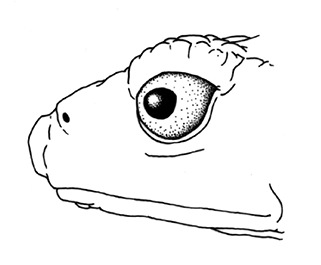
- Female

Conservation status
- Critically Endangered (IUCN 3.1)

Scientific classification
- Kingdom: Animalia
- Phylum: Chordata
- Class: Amphibia
- Order: Anura
- Family: Bufonidae
- Genus: Osornophryne
- Species: O. cofanorum

Binomial name
- Osornophryne cofanorum Mueses-Cisneros, Yánez-Muñoz & Guayasamin, 2010

= Osornophryne cofanorum =

Species of toad

Osornophryne cofanorum, commonly known as the Cofan plump toad or Cofan toadlet, is a species of true toad. Osornophryne cofanorum is native to the mountane forests of Ecuador, and classified as critically endangered. It is named after the Cofán people.

== Distribution ==
Osornophryne cofanorum is found in Ecuador's Cordillera Real mountains and montane forests.

Its extent of occurrence is 49 square kilometres (19 sq mi), though it may be wider, as there are no obvious barriers to dispersal. The species' range may extend into Colombia.

The holotype was collected at an elevation of 2,614 metres (8,576 ft), in Ecuador's Sucumbíos Province.

== Taxonomy ==
Osornophryne cofanorum was described in 2010.

A 2012 genetic analysis found that Osornophryne cofanorum is a sister taxon of Osornophryne guacamayo.

== Description ==
Osornophryne cofanorum has a snout-to-vent length of up to 1.8 centimetres (0.71 in) in males, and up to 3.4 centimetres (1.3 in) in females. The head is longer than it is wide. The fourth and fifth toes are elongated.

The species has small warts, though the back and sides are smooth. The underside is grainy.

The males have green heads and eyelids, grey bodies, and yellow, brown, cream, or white warts. The underside has white, yellow, and orange warts. The females are brown, and have bluish-grey abdomens with yellow warts. The hands are feet are brown to reddish-pink. The iris is brown.

Osornophryne cofanorum is nocturnal and semi-arboreal.

== Reproduction ==
Females lay twelve large cream eggs, in addition to two or three smaller eggs. The species undergoes direct development. Toadlets have been found on the leaves of bromeliads and shrubs.

== Conservation ==
In 2021, Osornophryne cofanorum was assessed as critically endangered by the IUCN. The species' habitat is threatened by mining.

== Nomenclature ==
Osornophryne cofanorum is named after the indigenous Cofán people, as the species was discovered in their territory. Its common English names are "Cofan plump toad" and "Cofan Toadlet".
