= Sumaco Napo-Galeras National Park =

National park in Ecuador

- IUCN category II (national park)
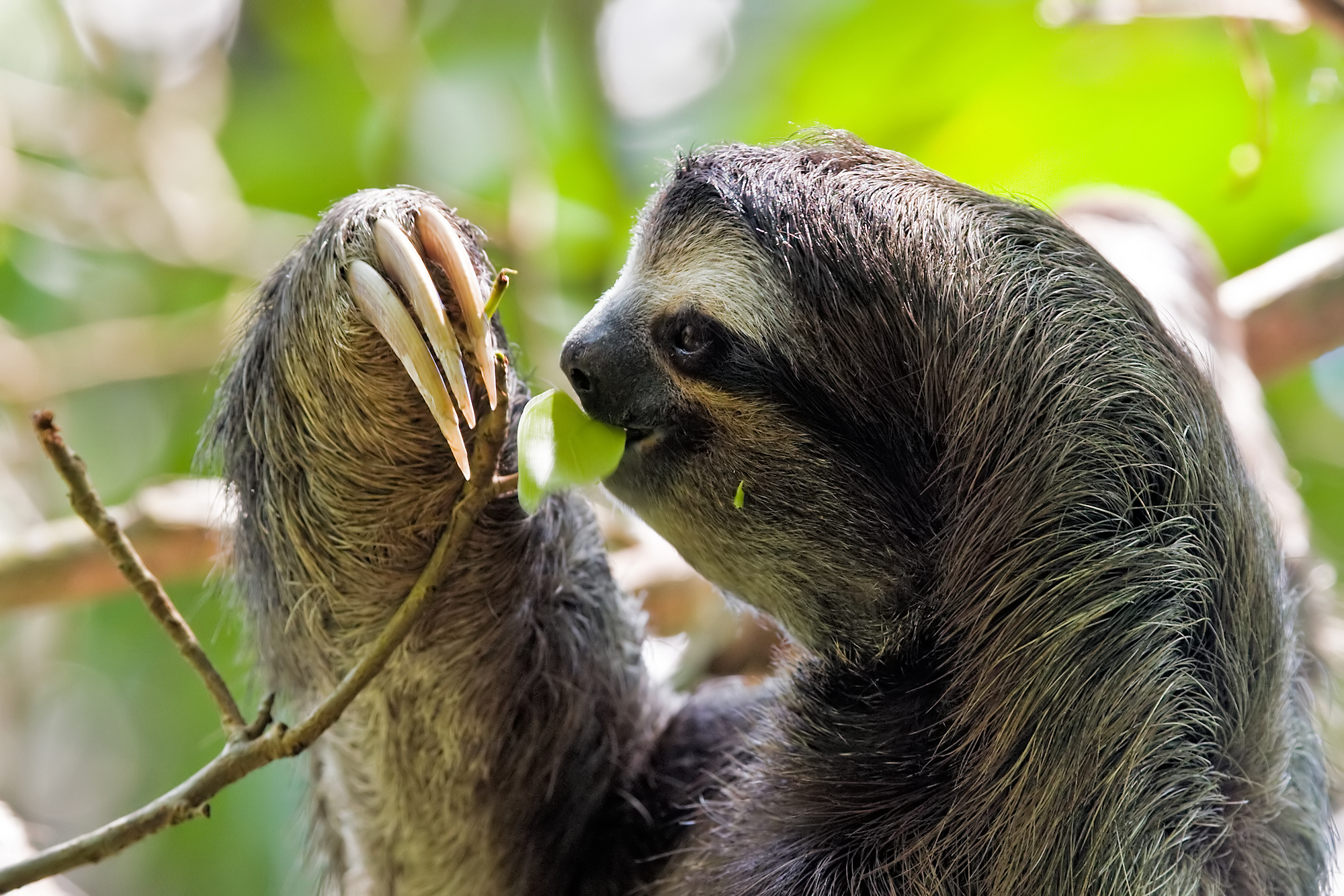
- Brown-throated sloth

- Location within Ecuador
- Location: Ecuador; Napo Province, and Orellana Province
- Coordinates: 0°23′0″S 77°33′0″W
- Area: 206,749 ha (510,890 acres)
- Established: 2 March 1994

Sumaco Napo-Galeras National Park (Spanish: Parque Nacional Sumaco Napo-Galeras) is a protected area in Ecuador situated in the Napo Province, Orellana Province and Sucumbíos Province. The highest point of the park is the Sumaco volcano that peaks at 3,732 m; the lowest altitude is 600 m.

== Fauna ==
Some 280 birds species are known from the park, but the true number is probably much higher because the park is little explored. Notable birds include Dysithamnus occidentalis, Touit stictoptera, Ara militaris, and Galbula pastazae. A mammal survey conducted at 2500 m on the eastern slope of Sumaco revealed 17 species, including eight species of bats. Larger mammals include Panthera onca, Tremarctos ornatus, Myrmecophaga tridactyla, Tapirus pinchaque, and Puma concolor. Little information exists on other groups, but it is assumed that the diversity of amphibians and reptiles is particularly high. Indeed, a number of amphibians are only known from the area, including toad Osornophryne sumacoensis that is only known from the eastern slopes of Sumaco. Similarly, Pristimantis ernesti is only known from the summit of Sumaco.
