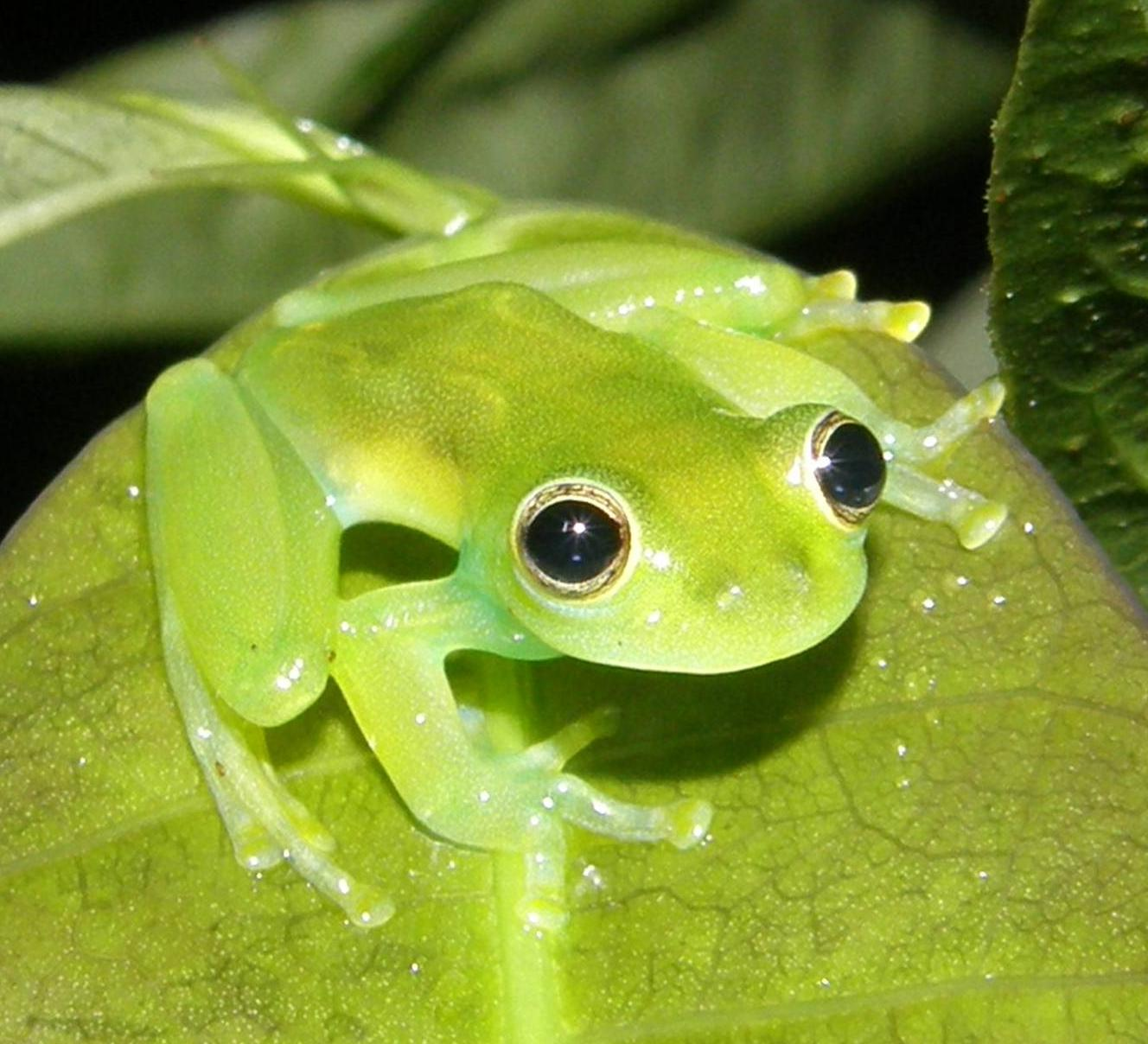

Conservation status
- Least Concern (IUCN 3.1)

Scientific classification
- Kingdom: Animalia
- Phylum: Chordata
- Class: Amphibia
- Order: Anura
- Family: Centrolenidae
- Genus: Teratohyla
- Species: T. spinosa

Binomial name
- Teratohyla spinosa (Taylor, 1949)

Synonyms
- Centrolenella spinosa Taylor, 1949; Cochranella spinosa (Taylor, 1949)

= Teratohyla spinosa =

Species of amphibian

Teratohyla spinosa (common name: spiny Cochran frog) is a species of frog in the family Centrolenidae. It is found in the Pacific lowlands of northern and central Ecuador and western Colombia, northward on the Pacific slopes Panama and Costa Rica, as well as on the Caribbean slopes of Costa Rica, Nicaragua, and Honduras.

== Description ==
Teratohyla spinosa are small, green frogs with large, protuberant eyes. Males grow to a snout–vent length of 18–20 mm (0.71–0.79 in) and females to 20–23 mm (0.79–0.91 in). Tadpoles are 16 mm (0.63 in) in length when metamorphosing. Adult males have an exposed spine at the base of the thumb.

Males call throughout the wet season (May–October) from the low vegetation surrounding small streams. Females lay 18–25 eggs on the underside of vegetation in a single layer of loose jelly. Larvae develop in streams.

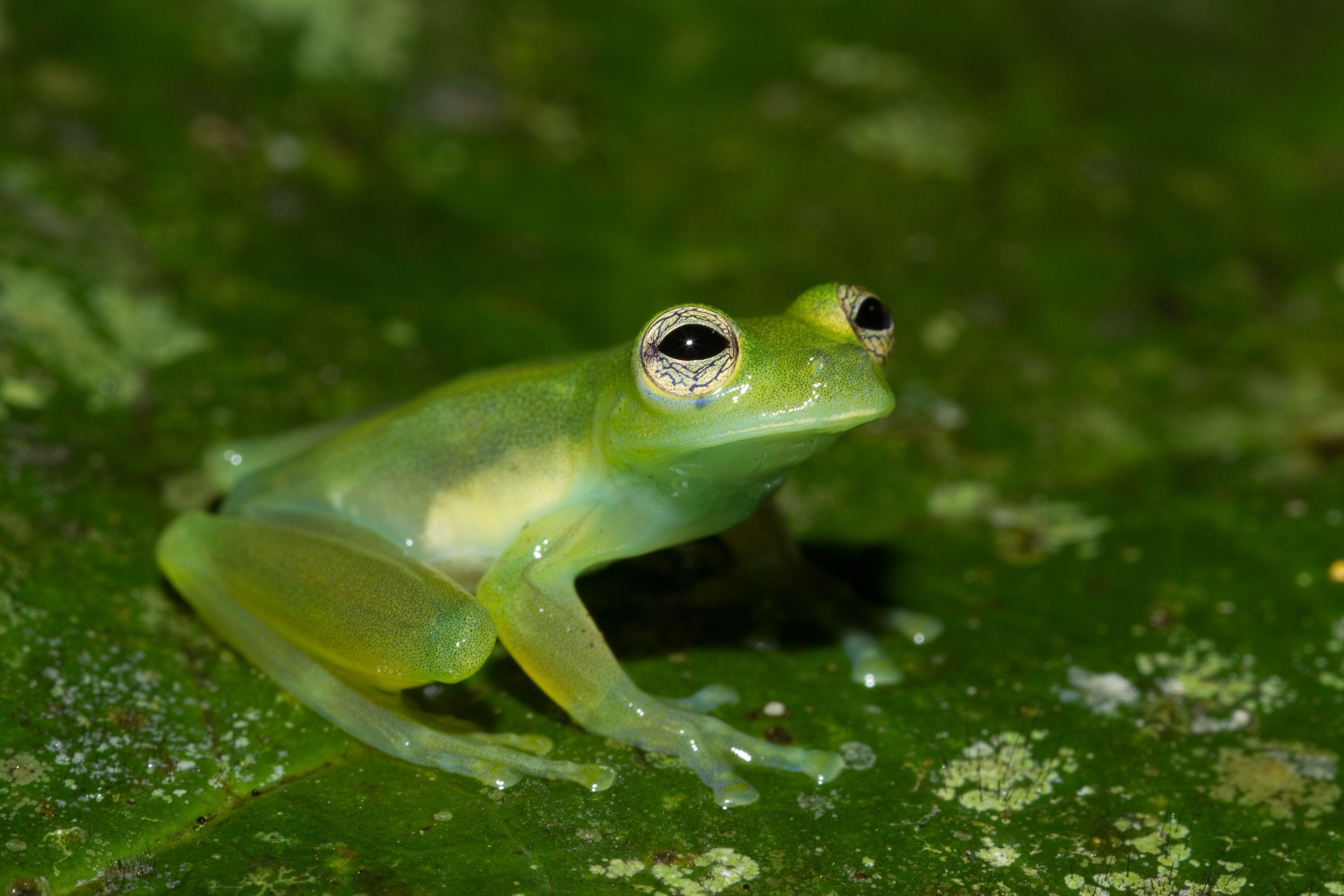

== Habitat and conservation ==
Teratohyla spinosa inhabits lowland primary humid lowland forests at elevations between 20 and 800 m (66 and 2,625 ft) above sea level. It is found along streams in the low vegetation. Its habitat is threatened by deforestation, although the species is not considered threatened in view of its wide distribution and presumed large population.
