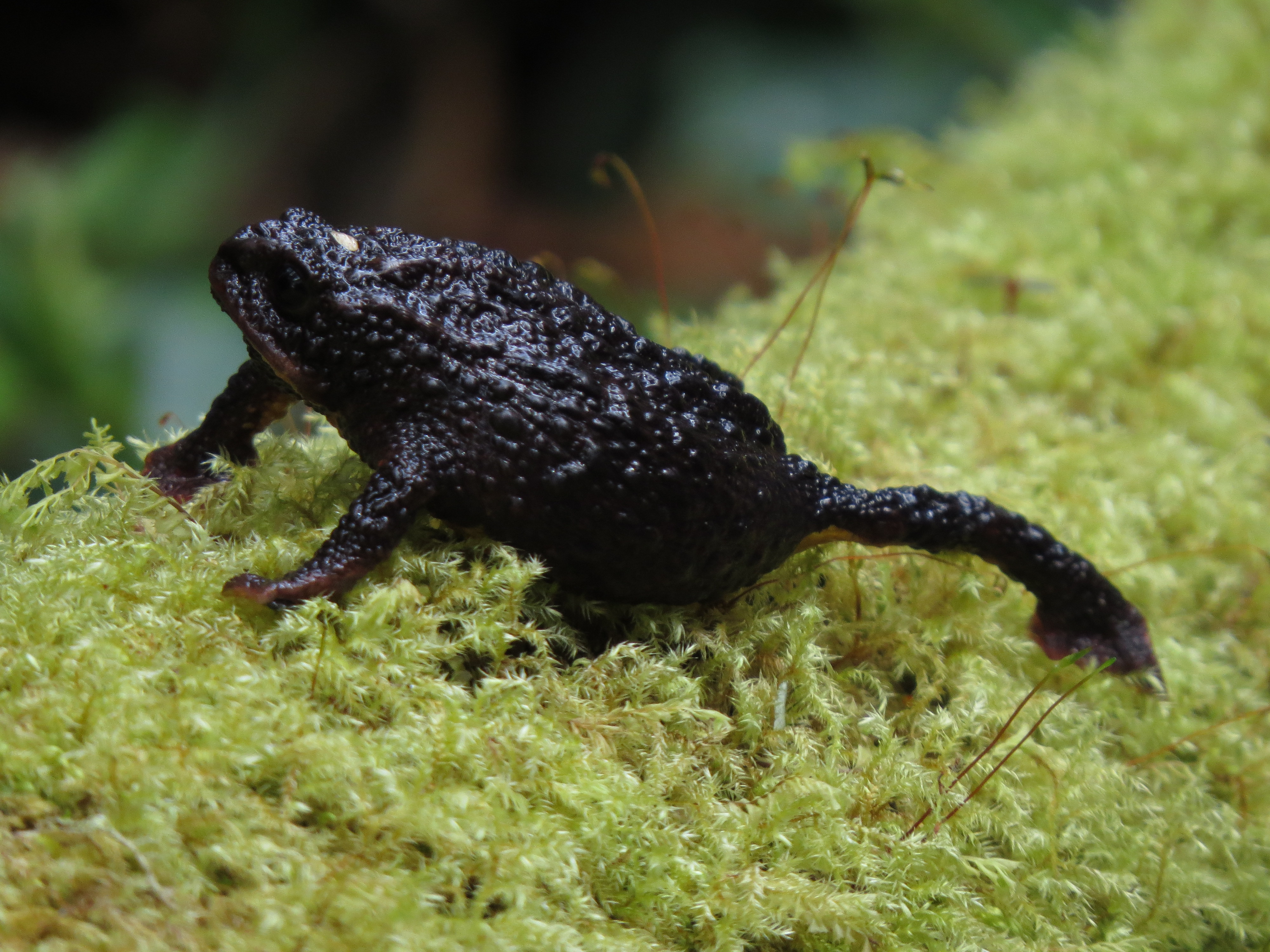

Conservation status
- Vulnerable (IUCN 3.1)

Scientific classification
- Kingdom: Animalia
- Phylum: Chordata
- Class: Amphibia
- Order: Anura
- Family: Bufonidae
- Genus: Osornophryne
- Species: O. percrassa

Binomial name
- Osornophryne percrassa Ruíz-Carranza & Hernández-Camacho, 1976

= Herveo plump toad =

Species of amphibian

The Herveo plump toad (Osornophryne percrassa) is a species of toad in the family Bufonidae. It is endemic to the Cordillera Central in the Antioquia, Caldas, Quindío, and Tolima Departments, Colombia.

== Description ==
Osornophryne percrassa are relatively small toads: males measure 23–28 mm (0.91–1.10 in) and females 27–38 mm (1.1–1.5 in) in snout–vent length. It differs from other Osornophryne by its truncated snout in lateral view, with a little non-projected papilla at the end, and by its light spots on the belly.

== Habitat and conservation ==
Its natural habitats are Andean forests and páramos at elevations of 2,700–3,700 m (8,900–12,100 ft) asl. It is a ground-dwelling species found among leaf-litter and rocks, or in terrestrial and arboreal bromeliads. Development is direct. It is an uncommon species threatened by habitat loss and fragmentation, mainly from agriculture, and by pollution from the fumigation of illegal crops. Climate change might also pose a threat. The species is known from a number of protected areas.
