= Teratohyla adenocheira =

Conservation status
- Least Concern (IUCN 3.1)

Scientific classification
- Kingdom: Animalia
- Phylum: Chordata
- Class: Amphibia
- Order: Anura
- Family: Centrolenidae
- Genus: Teratohyla
- Species: T. adenocheira

Binomial name
- Teratohyla adenocheira (Harvey and Noonan, 2005)

Synonyms
- Cochranella adenocheira Harvey and Noonan, 2005

Species of amphibian

Teratohyla adenocheira is a species of frogs in the family Centrolenidae. It is known from the Noel Kempff Mercado National Park, its type locality in eastern Bolivia, as well as more widely from Brazil, in the states of Mato Grosso, Pará, and Rondônia. The species' closest relative is T. Midas.

== Description ==
Adult males in the type series (three specimens) measure 21.4–22.4 mm (0.84–0.88 in) in snout–vent length (SVL). An unsexed specimen from Rondônia measured 25 mm (0.98 in) SVL. The head wider than the body. The snout is short and round in dorsal view, but truncate in profile. The eyes are large. The tympanum is distinct. The arms are short but the legs are relatively long. The fingers are slightly webbed whereas the toes are extensively webbed. The dorsum is dark green with bright yellow spots. The dermal folds and glands are white. Gular and ventral skin is translucent. The iris is yellow-green.

== Habitat and conservation ==
Its natural habitats are tropical moist lowland forests, although a specimen has also been collected in a secondary forest on a river bank, on the surface of the palm Lepidocaryum. The type series were found on vegetation along a sandy stream bed.
