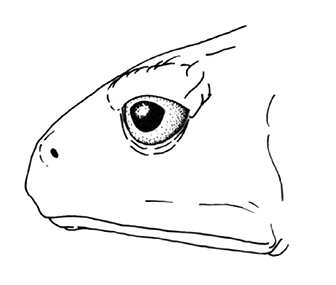
- Head shape in lateral view of Osornophryne puruanta female, QCAZ 11471

Scientific classification
- Kingdom: Animalia
- Phylum: Chordata
- Class: Amphibia
- Order: Anura
- Family: Bufonidae
- Genus: Osornophryne
- Species: O. puruanta

Binomial name
- Osornophryne puruanta Gluesenkamp & Guayasamin, 2008

= Osornophryne puruanta =

Species of amphibian

Osornophryne puruanta is a species of toads in the family Bufonidae. It is endemic to Ecuador.
