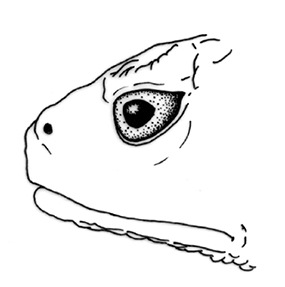

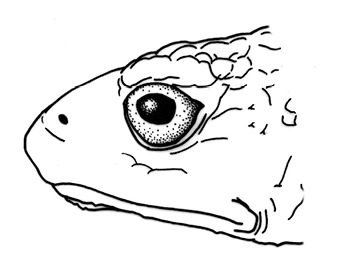
- Lateral view of the head of female (top) and male (bottom) O. bufoniformis

Conservation status
- Near Threatened (IUCN 3.1)

Scientific classification
- Kingdom: Animalia
- Phylum: Chordata
- Class: Amphibia
- Order: Anura
- Family: Bufonidae
- Genus: Osornophryne
- Species: O. bufoniformis

Binomial name
- Osornophryne bufoniformis (Peracca, 1904)

Synonyms
- Atelopus bufoniformis Peracca, 1904

= Osornophryne bufoniformis =

Species of amphibian

Osornophryne bufoniformis is a species of toad in the family Bufonidae. It is found in the Andes of southern Colombia (Colombian Massif) and northern Ecuador. Common name Peracca's plump toad has been proposed for it, in allusion to Mario Giacinto Peracca, the scientist who described this species in 1904.

== Description ==
Adult males measure 16–23 mm (0.6–0.9 in) and adult females 28–36 mm (1.1–1.4 in) in snout–vent length. The occipital ridges are low or absent. The limbs are short and thin. The fingers and the toes have fleshy webbing. The dorsum is covered with numerous round pustules of different sizes. Dorsal coloration is black-brown, dark brown, light brown, or reddish brown. A yellow or light brown glandular dorsolateral line can be present. The belly is light or dark brown with yellow or red pustules.

== Habitat and conservation ==
Osornophryne bufoniformis occurs in montane forests, bush land, and páramo at elevations of 2,800–4,700 m (9,200–15,400 ft) above sea level. They can be found on fallen leaves and on the ground, but also in terrestrial bromeliads and on vegetation up to half a meter above the ground. Development is direct (i.e, there is no free-living larval stage).

It is a rare species that is uncommon even when present. It is threatened by habitat loss (deforestation) caused by agricultural development, cultivation of illegal crops, fire, logging, and human settlements. Pollution resulting from the spraying of illegal crops is also a threat. It is present in several protected areas.
