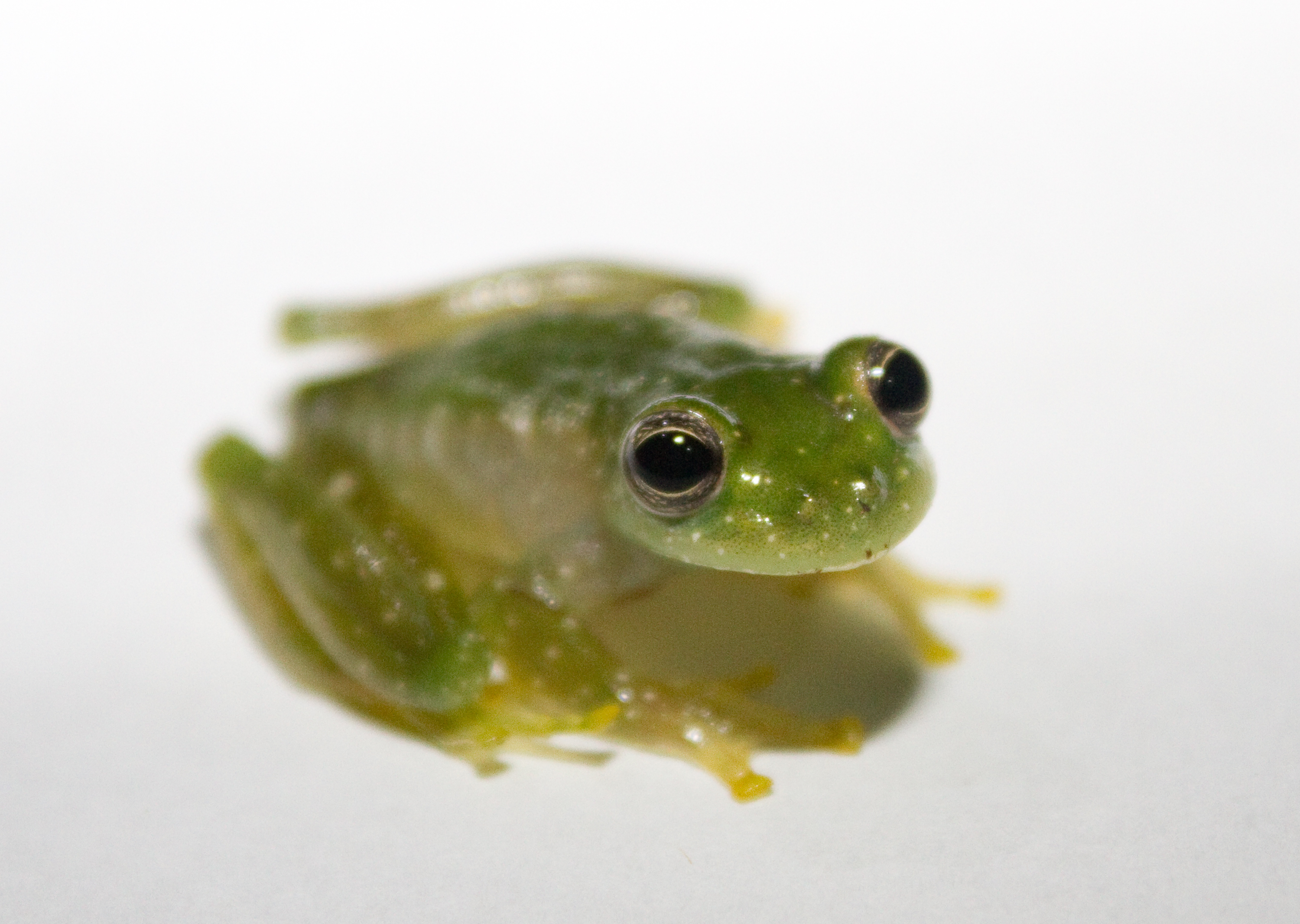

Conservation status
- Least Concern (IUCN 3.1)

Scientific classification
- Kingdom: Animalia
- Phylum: Chordata
- Class: Amphibia
- Order: Anura
- Family: Centrolenidae
- Genus: Teratohyla
- Species: T. pulverata

Binomial name
- Teratohyla pulverata (Peters, 1873)

Synonyms
- Many, see text

= Powdered glass frog =

Species of frog

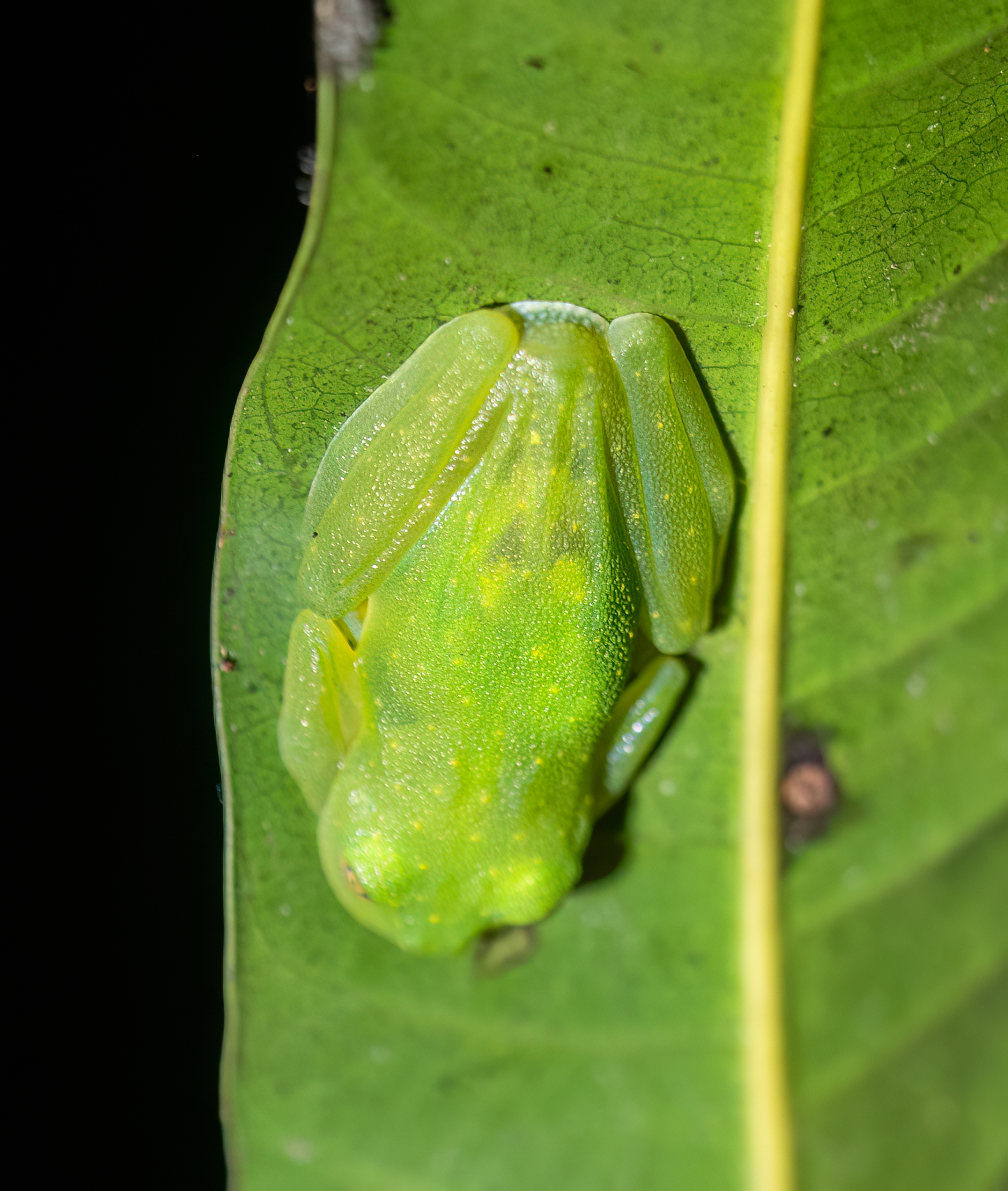
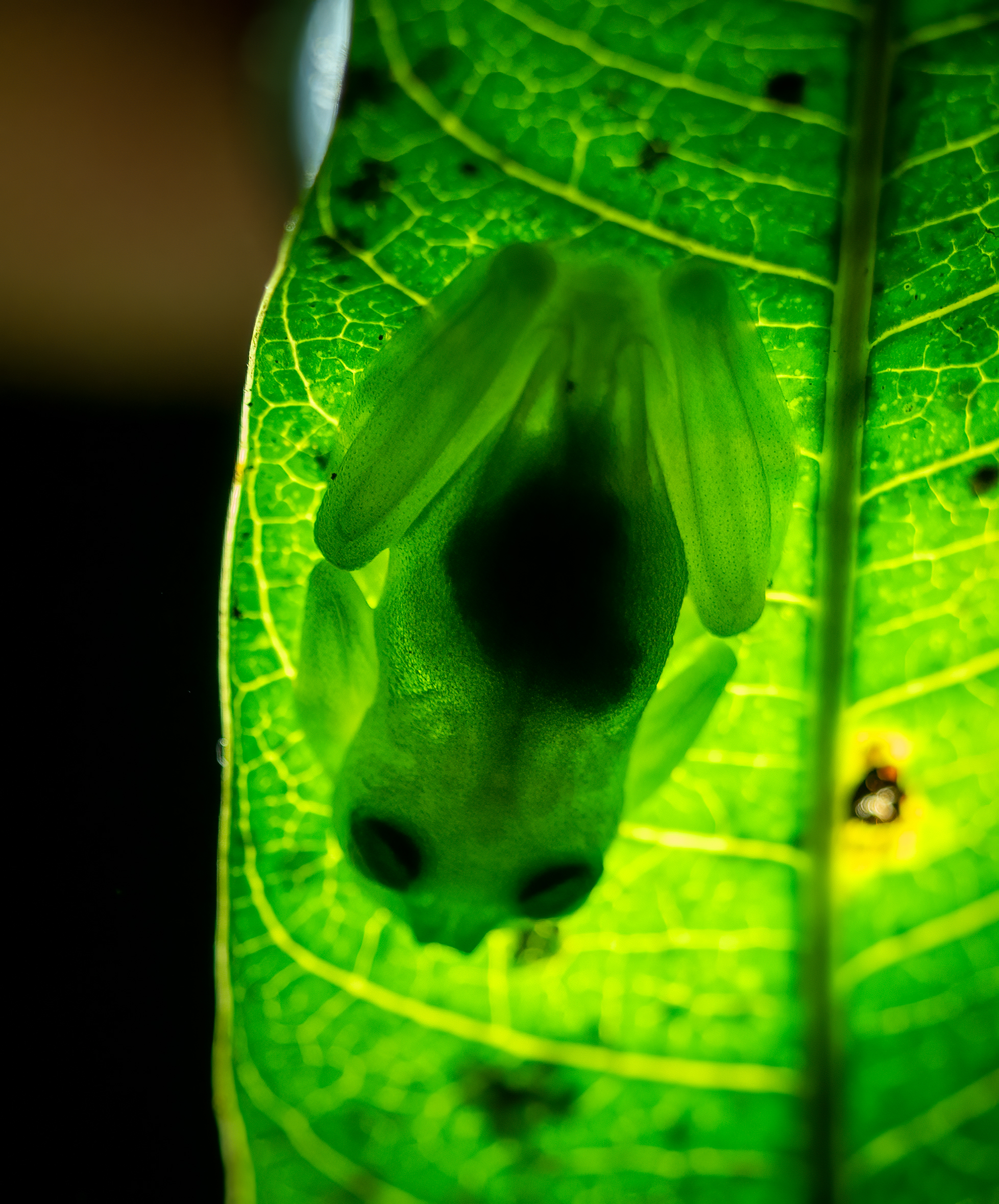
Powdered glass frog lit from above and below

The powdered glass frog or Chiriqui glass frog (Teratohyla pulverata) is a frog species in the glass frog family (Centrolenidae). The species is found from north-central Honduras south to northwestern Ecuador.

== Description ==
Teratohyla pulverata is a small glass frog, lacking humeral spines in males, and has a lobed bulbous liver, placing it in the genus Cochranella. Adult males measure 22–24.5 mm from the snout to the vent, while the females are larger at 25.3–28.3 mm snout-vent length. The snout is rounded if seen from above, but presents a distinctly sloped profile when viewed from the side. The translucent tympanum is visible but not large, measuring about one-fifth to one-fourth of the eye's diameter; the tympanic annulus is not hidden except for the dorsal margin, which is covered by the supratympanic fold.

Their color is green above, with a rich scattering of small, white spots – hence the species' scientific name, which means "the powdered one". The back has a rough shagreen-like texture, particularly in males, where it is covered in tiny spicules. The belly is transparent and has a grained texture. Thus, the green bones and some internal organs can be observed in the living animal – particularly as this species' parietal (outer) peritoneum is completely translucent, too; the inner peritonea covering the liver and gastrointestinal tract are white. The iris is greyish-white with tiny yellow dots and a network of thin, dark-grey lines; a thin cream-yellow ring surrounds the pupil. Melanophores are abundant on the dorsal surface of the fourth finger, but absent on the first three fingers. Preserved specimens are usually cream-colored to light lavender above, with the spotting remaining white or becoming transparent.

The dentigerous process of the vomer carries two to four teeth. The males have a type-I nuptial pad; the prepollex is concealed. The toes and most fingers of C. pulverata are webbed; the webbing between the first two fingers (which are of equal length) is absent or vestigial, however. The webbing formula for the outer fingers is II (1^{+}-1^{1/3}) – (2^{4/5}-3^{−}) III (1^{1/3}-1^{2/3}) – (1^{+}-2^{−}) IV; for the toes, it is I (1^{−}-1) – (1^{2/3}-2^{−}) II (1^{−}-1) – (1^{3/4}-2^{−}) III (1-1^{+}) – (1^{2/3}-2^{+}) IV (2^{−}-2^{+}) – (1^{−}-1^{+}) V. The discs at the finger and toe tips are small, about the size of the eardrum on the third finger. This species has no tubercles on the thighs; the metacarpus, ulna, metatarsus, and tarsus have tubercular folds, resulting in a wavy outline of the limbs.

The tooth row formula of tadpoles is 2/3, with the A2 tooth row broadly separated in the center.

== Range and ecology ==
Its natural habitats are tropical moist lowland forests and rivers; it is mostly found in riparian vegetation. In the northern part of its range (south to the Isthmus of Panama approximately) it is found on the Atlantic side of the American Cordillera; on the Pacific side, it is found from Costa Rica southwards. It occurs up to 960 meters ASL in the northern parts of its range, but apparently only up to 300 m ASL in its southern haunts.

The males call sitting on the upper sides of leaves, usually giving three notes of about 0.05 seconds duration with a dominant frequency of 5,600–6,200 Hz, separated by a 0.5– to 0.8-second pause from each other. It is unknown if and how they physically fight for females. The clutches are deposited on the upper sides of leaves above small streams; after hatching, the tadpoles drop into the water. The parents do not guard the eggs or care for their offspring otherwise.

Moderately common in Honduras, it is uncommon in Costa Rica, and only rarely found in Colombia. Able to persist in small forest fragments, it is not considered threatened by the IUCN.

== Taxonomy ==
This frog, like many Centrolenidae, has a confusing taxonomic history. It was initially described as a tree frog of genus Hyla; on recognizing its true affiliations, it was variously placed in the genera Centrolene, Centrolenella (now included in Centrolene) and Hyalinobatrachium. In 2008, it was found to include the mysterious frog that had been described as Cochranella petersi, and was subsequently considered allied or identical to Fleischmann's glass frog (H. fleischmanni) or H. valerioi in error. In 2009, it was transferred to then-resurrected Teratohyla.

Thus, the complete synonymy of this species is:

- Centrolene pulveratum (Peters, 1873)
- Centrolenella petersi (Goin, 1961)
- Centrolenella pulverata (Peters, 1873)
- Centrolenella pulveratum (Peters, 1873; lapsus)
- Cochranella pulverata (Peters, 1873)
- Cochranella petersi Goin, 1961
- Hyalinobatrachium petersi (Goin, 1961)
- Hyalinobatrachium pulveratum (Peters, 1873)
- Hyla pulverata Peters, 1873

The holotype of this species is specimen ZMB 7842, that of C. petersi is specimen BM 1902.5.27.24.
