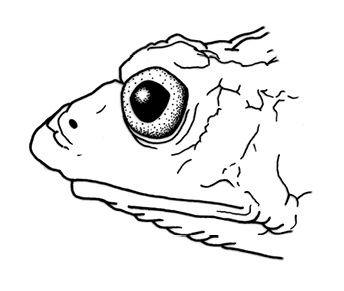
- Male
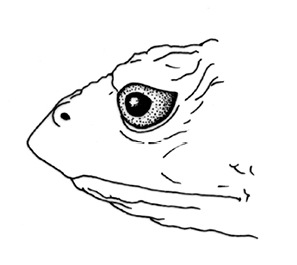
- Female

Conservation status
- Endangered (IUCN 3.1)

Scientific classification
- Kingdom: Animalia
- Phylum: Chordata
- Class: Amphibia
- Order: Anura
- Family: Bufonidae
- Genus: Osornophryne
- Species: O. occidentalis

Binomial name
- Osornophryne occidentalis Cisneros-Heredia & Gluesenkamp, 2011

= Osornophryne occidentalis =

Species of toad

Osornophryne occidentalis (also known as the western toadlet or western Andean plump toad) is a species of true toads. It was described in 2011.

Osornophryne occidentalis is native to the cloud forests of Ecuador. It is native to, and named for, the Cordillera Occidental.

O. occidentalis is sexually dimorphic in colour and size. The species is endangered, and at risk from habitat destruction, although it occurs in protected areas.

== Taxonomy ==
Osornophryne occidentalis was described in 2011, by Diego F. Cisneros-Heredia and Andrew G. Gluesenkamp. It was the ninth species of Osornophryne to be identified.

A 2012 genetic analysis found O. occidentalis to be a sister taxon of Osornophryne sumacoensis.

== Distribution ==
Osornophryne occidentalis is found on the western slopes of Ecuador's Cordillera Occidental, and is likely to be present in Colombia. The species has an extent of occurrence of around 3,858 square kilometres (1,490 sq mi), and is found in three to five locations. It occurs at elevations of 2,095–2,815 metres (6,873–9,236 ft).

The species is semi-arboreal. It is found under the leaf litter of montane cloud forests, between tree roots, on moss covered surfaces, and on bromeliads.

The holotype, an adult female, was collected 11 kilometres (6.8 mi) west of Nono, in Colombia's Pichincha Province.

== Description ==
The back is dark brown, and has ochre-brown warts and ridges. The underside is white in females, and pale pink in males, and has dark brown marks, which is distinct from most other species of Osornophryne. The throat is brown in males, and brown and white in females. The iris is black with red and gold flecks.

Males have a maximum snout-to-vent length (SVL) of 2.2 centimetres (0.87 in), and females have a maximum SVL of 3.6 centimetres (1.4 in). The back is wrinkled and has warts. The flanks and abdomen also have warts. The head is wider than it is long. The lips are flared in adults, though this is not true of juveniles.

The species is believed to undergo direct development.

== Conservation ==
In 2021, the IUCN listed Osornophryne occidentalis as Endangered. The species is uncommon, and the population is likely to be decreasing. It is at risk from habitat decline and fragmentation, as well as soil pollution and fires. In Mindo, Ecuador, the species is at risk from an oil pipeline.

Populations of Osornophryne occidentalis exist in the Chocó Andino de Pichincha biosphere reserve, and several protected forests. Some subpopulations are found near the Cotacachi Cayapas Ecological Reserve, but these are threatened by resource extraction and agriculture. One subpopulation may have been rendered extinct by habitat destruction.

== Etymology ==
Osornophryne occidentalis is named after its habitat in the Cordillera Occidental.
