= Teratohyla amelie =

Conservation status
- Least Concern (IUCN 3.1)

Scientific classification
- Kingdom: Animalia
- Phylum: Chordata
- Class: Amphibia
- Order: Anura
- Family: Centrolenidae
- Genus: Teratohyla
- Species: T. amelie

Binomial name
- Teratohyla amelie (Cisneros-Heredia and Meza-Ramos, 2007)

Synonyms
- Cochranella amelie Cisneros-Heredia and Meza-Ramos, 2007

Species of amphibian

Teratohyla amelie, Amelie's glassfrog, is a species belonging to the family Centrolenidae—also known as glass frogs—and is found in the Amazonian lowlands of Ecuador and Peru.

It is named after the protagonist of the movie Amélie, as explained by Cisneros-Heredia and Meza-Ramos: "The specific name—a noun in apposition—of this new species of Glassfrog is for Amelie, protagonist of the extraordinary movie Le Fabuleux Destin d'Amélie Poulain; a movie where little details play an important role in the achievement of joie de vivre; like the important role that Glassfrogs and all amphibians and reptiles play in the health of our planet."

== Description ==
Teratohyla amelie is very small, with the SVL of recorded males only measuring from 18.1–19.3 mm (0.71–0.76 in). It has a translucent, shagreen dorsum that is a uniform green to bluish-green color—entirely lacking the colored spots found in similar species of glassfrogs—and has a completely transparent ventral parietal peritoneum. Additionally, T. amelie lacks vomerine teeth and a humeral spine, has green bones and a bulbous, white liver, and deposits its eggs on the upper surfaces of leaves.
