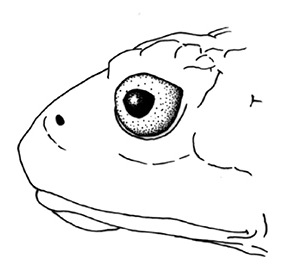

Conservation status
- Endangered (IUCN 3.1)

Scientific classification
- Kingdom: Animalia
- Phylum: Chordata
- Class: Amphibia
- Order: Anura
- Family: Bufonidae
- Genus: Osornophryne
- Species: O. antisana

Binomial name
- Osornophryne antisana Hoogmoed, 1987

= Osornophryne antisana =

Species of amphibian

Osornophryne antisana, the Napo plump toad, is a species of toad in the family Bufonidae.

It is endemic to Ecuador. Its natural habitats are subtropical or tropical moist montane forests, subtropical or tropical high-altitude shrubland, and subtropical or tropical high-altitude grassland.

It is threatened by habitat loss.

== Distribution ==
The species is endemic to Ecuador's Cordillera Real mountains. It is found at elevations of 2,609–4,128 metres (8,560–13,543 ft), and has an extent of occurrence around 2,930 square kilometres (1,130 sq mi).

The species is found near lakes, and in Páramo and forest habitats. Individuals have been found under stones and dead Espeletia plants.

== Taxonomy ==
The species was described in 1987.

== Description ==
The back is yellow to dark or greyish-brown. The iris is black with gold flecks. The snout-vent length is up to 19 millimetres (0.75 in) in males, and up to 29 millimetres (1.1 in) in females. The back has small warts, and the sides have small to medium warts.

== Conservation ==
Osornophryne antisana is classified as endangered. Its habitat is fragmented, and declining in extent and quality. The species may also be threatened by pollution and fires.

== Etymology ==
The species is named after the Antisana Volcano, in Antisana Ecological Reserve. The holotype was found on the volcano's slopes.
