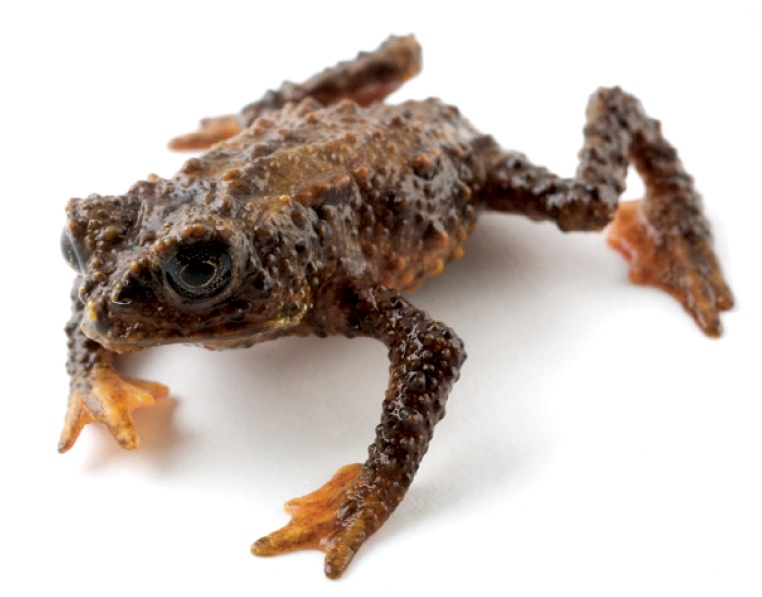
- Osornophryne simpsoni

Scientific classification
- Kingdom: Animalia
- Phylum: Chordata
- Class: Amphibia
- Order: Anura
- Family: Bufonidae
- Genus: Osornophryne; Ruiz-Carranza & Hernández-Camacho, 1976

Type species
- Osornophryne percrassa

Diversity
- 12 species (see text)

= Osornophryne =

Genus of amphibians

Osornophryne (Osorno's toadlets or plump toads) is a genus of true toads endemic to the Cordillera Central in Colombia and central Andes in Ecuador.

== Species ==
Binomial name and author	Common name
Osornophryne antisana Hoogmoed, 1987	Napo plump toad
Osornophryne backshalli Reyes-Puig, Urgilés-Merchán, Ortega-Andrade, Cisneros-Heredia, Carrión-Olmedo & Yánez-Muñoz 2025	Steve Backshall’s Andean Toad
Osornophryne bufoniformis (Peracca, 1904)	Peracca's plump toad
Osornophryne cofanorum Mueses-Cisneros, Yánez-Muñoz, and Guayasamin, 2010
Osornophryne guacamayo Hoogmoed, 1987	Guacamayo plump toad
Osornophryne occidentalis Cisneros-Heredia and Gluesenkamp, 2011
Osornophryne percrassa Ruiz-Carranza and Hernández-Camacho, 1976	Herveo plump toad
Osornophryne puruanta Gluesenkamp & Guayasamin, 2008
Osornophryne simpsoni Páez-Moscoso, Guayasamin, and Yánez-Muñoz, 2011
Osornophryne sumacoensis Gluesenkamp, 1995
Osornophryne talipes Cannatella, 1986	Cannatella's plump toad

Osornophryne angel, a species described in 2011, is considered a synonym of Osornophryne bufoniformis.

== Distribution ==
The genus occurs in Colombia (Antioquia Department) and the central Andes of Ecuador.

== Description ==
Osornophryne are small to medium sized toads. O. antisana is the smallest species, with a maximum snout-vent length of 2.9 centimetres (1.1 in). O. puruanta is the largest species, with a maximum snout-vent length of 4.7 centimetres (1.9 in). Species vary greatly in colour and texture. The toads are nocturnal, semiarboreal, and terrestrial.

The genus is characterised by hands and feet with thick webbing, a ventrally directed cloacal tube, and having five or six sacral vertebrae, amongst other characteristics. They lack vocal slits and a tympanic membrane. The head is usually wider than it is long.

The genus exhibits sexual dimorphism in various traits. The males have keratinized nuptial pads. The eggs are large, terrestrial, and unpigmented, with a dark brown capsule. The toads undergo direct development.

== Etymology ==
The genus is named after the professors Ernesto and Hernando Osorno Mesa.
