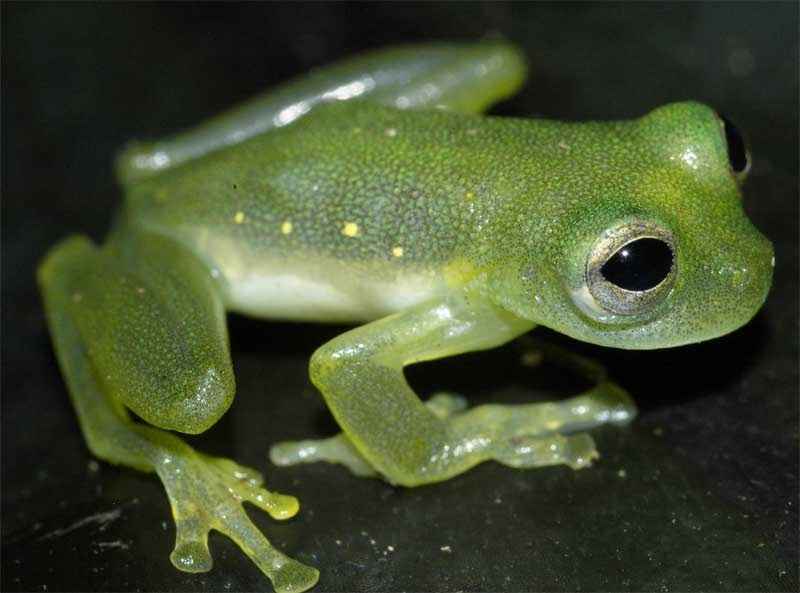

Conservation status
- Least Concern (IUCN 3.1)

Scientific classification
- Kingdom: Animalia
- Phylum: Chordata
- Class: Amphibia
- Order: Anura
- Family: Centrolenidae
- Genus: Teratohyla
- Species: T. midas

Binomial name
- Teratohyla midas (Lynch and Duellman, 1973)

Synonyms
- Centrolenella midas Lynch and Duellman, 1973; Cochranella midas (Lynch and Duellman, 1973)

= Teratohyla midas =

Species of amphibian

Teratohyla midas (common name: Santa Cecilia Cochran frog) is a species of frog in the family Centrolenidae, which are also known as glass frogs. The species Teratohyla midas was first recorded in 1973 by Lynch, J. D., & Duellman, W. E. This Amazonian species appears to be semi-transparent with gold flecks on its back. Though many species of the glass frog, Centrolendidae, are similar in terms of diet and habitats, they vary greatly among limbs and other physiologies. Because of the similarities between T. midas and other glass frogs, Centrolendidae, researchers often group T. midas together with other species within the same family.

== Characteristics ==
T. midas is arboreal, meaning that they mainly live in trees. Through their semi-opaque skins, one can see the green bones and if the specimen is female, the humerus spine. Their snout has a truncated shape from the dorsal view leading to an angled appearance around the lateral nostril region. Adult snout-vent length is around 17.4 millimetres (0.69 in) to 19.2 mm (0.76 in) in males and 20.6 mm (0.81 in) to 25.6 mm (1.01 in) in females. The shape of the finger discs of T. midas is rounded and truncated, and all discs are around the same size. The fingers do not bear narrow lateral fringes. Both hands and feet have median levels of webbing. Webbing completely encloses all toes but only encloses the third and fourth fingers. The ground colors of T. midas have a darker lavender shade. T. midas have bright yellow-colored flecks on the dorsal side, which are similar to the unique fingerprints among humans. Researchers often use these flecks to distinguish between different samples. In preservatives, these yellow flecks turn white. Both hands and feet are dull greenish yellow. The heart is not visible, and the organs are unpigmented. The iris is silvery brown with black reticulation. Teratohyla Midas differs from other species of glass frogs due to their unique internal viscera structures. Their livers are covered by a transparent membrane called the heptadic peritoneum. The normal resting state of T. midas is when the frog has four legs closely stuck to the side of its body.

== Etymology ==
Its common name "Santa Cecilia" is named after the province of Napo, Ecuador, which had the most historical record of the species. The Latin root for its species name Midas is inspired by a Greek King who has the ability to turn everything he touches into gold. Thus, Teratohyla Midas' name refers to the golden specks on the specie's dorsal side.

== Physiology ==
Glass frogs are known to have opaque skin. An experiment first published in March 2020 demonstrated the significance of having semi-translucent skin in glass frogs using T. midas and Espadarana prosoblepon. The experiment collected twenty-five adult T. midas captured in French Guiana as samples. The samples were compared under a white background and a leaf background mimicking the species' natural living conditions. The twenty-five frogs were then observed based on four different visual models: tetrachromatic avian, trichromatic snake, dichromatic mammal, and trichromatic human.

=== Camouflage properties ===
Researchers also collected data based on human observers to compare the camouflage properties of T. midas. The results show that semi-opacity may not be a contributing property of changing the hues of the animal. Instead, the semi-transparent body of the frog can change translucency when placed in different surroundings. In other words, the result of the experiment reveals that the semi-transparent body of T. midas does not change colors to its surroundings; rather, it changes the brightness levels of its body to blend into the environment. Additionally, the opaque body decreases the outline of the frog on leaves, thus also blurring the distinction between the outline of T. midas and its surroundings, an important aspect of camouflaging. The same researchers also suggested that the semi-transparent properties may be an advantage over completely transparent, as it may block out harmful UV radiation from sunlight which protects the internal organs of individuals.

== Habitat ==
T. midas is mostly found in the lowlands of South America, with highly diverse vegetation, including both humid and dry forests. T. midas is mostly found in lowland areas of northern South America, usually at heights between 190 and 1050 m above sea level. The newest record is around twelve hundred kilometers southeast of the Crique, Grand Leblond French Guiana, which is the easternmost record of the species. The wide range of T. midas leads researchers to consider T. midas may be a possible species complex due to its widespread population.

=== Habitat destruction ===
Tadpoles develop in streams. It is locally suffering from habitat loss, but there are large areas of suitable habitat remaining. Though there are records of glass frogs, Centrolenidae, being kept as pets worldwide, there is no specific data on T. midas being kept in captivity.

== Mating ==
Advertisement calls have been described for fewer than 25% of species of glass frog. The advertisement call of T. midas consists of a single pulsed note with 3 pulses in very short emission. Series duration varies from 0.7 s to 61.8s. However, advertisement calls may vary due to geographical location. For example, calls from Ecuador presented 4 pulses/call, while in French Guiana and Brazil, they are composed of 3 pulses/call. The duration of calls also varies among geographical locations. Some populations in French Guiana have longer pulse duration than the population in Brazil. Though there is little data regarding reproductive ecology, observations have been recorded of a female hopping from leaf to leaf with the male on the back and maintaining its amplexus in the nuchal and axillary amplexus position. One research on T. midas in the Colombian Amazon suggests a pattern in the species' oviposition, the location at which female frogs repel their egg from the oviduct to the external environment. Female usually lay their eggs on rocks or plants above water so that when the eggs hatches into tadpoles, the tadpoles can directly fall into waterbodies.

== Parental care ==
=== Oviposition ===
T. midas has a tendency to choose a plant genus called Selaginella as the oviposition site. Researchers have hypothesized that because the plants have antibacterial and antifungal properties, they may protect the eggs from common fungus infections such as Saprolegnia. Additionally, these moth-like plants have scaled leaves which make their surface rougher. The uneven edges of the leaves would then increase tension between the clutches and the leaves, thus preventing displacement of the clutches due to wind or rain. Finally, there is no general pattern for the height at which T. midas lay their eggs.

=== Egg protection and guarding ===
After fertilization has occurred, the male would leave the oviposition site while the female remains to cover the eggs. The egg-laying process only lasts for a few seconds, but the female would continue to keep the eggs under its ventral or belly area for around an hour. Based on observations where the eggs seem more moisturized, one hypothesis the researchers have made is that this attendance action would keep the eggs more hydrated and protect them from future predation or danger. This reproductive behavior is relatively common among other glass frog species. An experiment has proven that female attendance of eggs keeps eggs moisturized in a species called Ikakogi tayrona, which is in the same family, Centrolenidae, as T. midas.

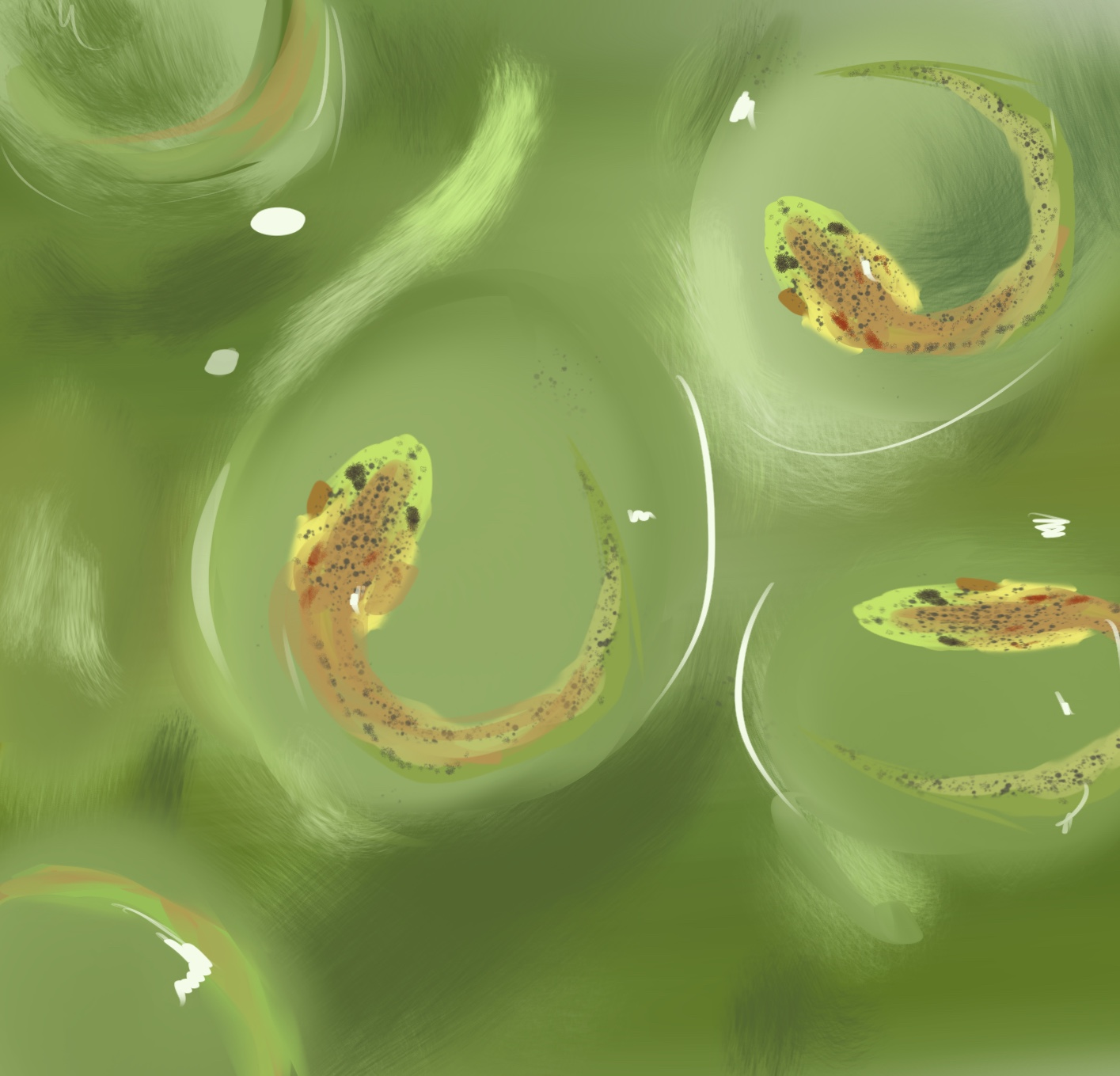
A Drawing of T. midas tadpoles in clear jelly eggs

== Growth and development ==
T. midas tadpoles are mainly found in clutches and found in overhanging water. The tadpoles will undergo the full development period in the clear jelly-like egg and fall into the waterbody once fully developed. During the embryonic developmental stage, the eggs appear to be bright yellow, contained within a clear jelly clutch, and consist of a bean-like shape [8]. After the tailbud stage and the external gills develop, the tadpoles of T. Midas can still be found within clear jelly of the clustered eggs with the tail curled. These tadpoles can swim around within the individual eggs. Grey spots are observed to be more concentrated around the dorsal fin and cranial area of the tadpoles. Most tissues in the tadpoles are opaque; thus, visceral structures can see through the skin, including the midbrain, forebrain, and gut. During this developmental stage, the gut appears to be bright green, while the other internal structures appear to have a dark-red hue.

== Predator and prey ==
There is no specific research on Teratohyla midas, but most glass frogs prey on insects such as crickets, moths, flies, and spiders. Predators of glass frogs are avian species and other reptilian species. Recorded cases of crested quetzal preying on glass frogs have been reported around Sierra de Perija. The avian species would capture the frog in its bill, and glass frogs would serve as a source of protein for tropical avians.

== Taxonomy ==
T. midas belongs to the genus Teratohyla, a monophyletic evolutionary group. All species in this genus habituate in lowland areas of South America. It is most closely related to the species Teratohyla adenocheira. Evidence of this speciation came from a pair of sister taxa separated by geographic barriers. T. midas and T. adenocheira were found to be separated by a South American Mountain range called the Andes. The diversion was thought to occur around 2.7 million years ago, corresponding with the new uplift or vertical elevation of the Eastern Cordillera mountain range.
