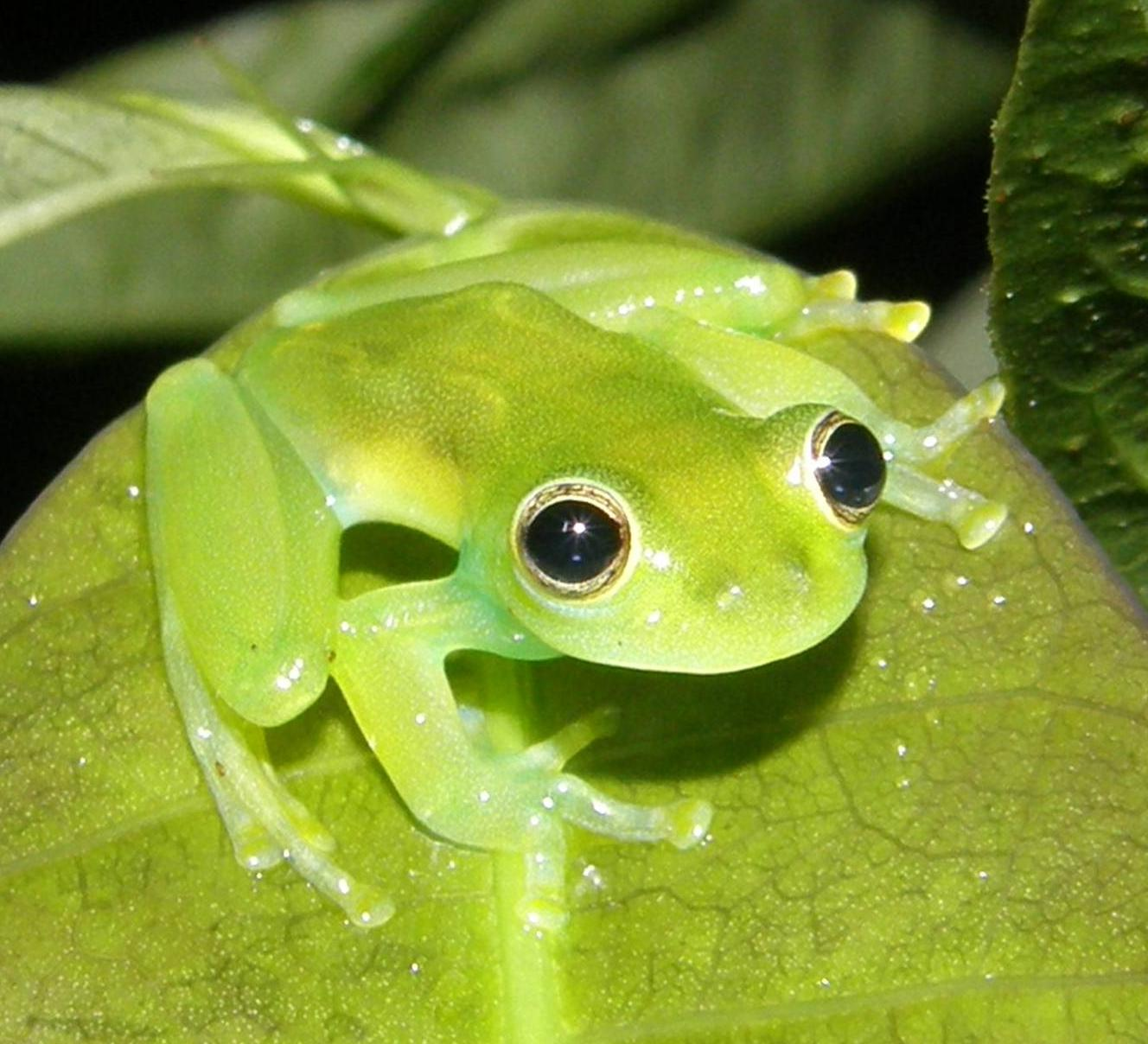
- Teratohyla spinosa

Scientific classification
- Kingdom: Animalia
- Phylum: Chordata
- Class: Amphibia
- Order: Anura
- Family: Centrolenidae
- Subfamily: Centroleninae
- Genus: Teratohyla; Taylor, 1951

Type species
- Centrolenella spinosa Taylor, 1949

= Teratohyla =

Genus of amphibians

Teratohyla is a small genus of glassfrogs in the subfamily Centroleninae. The genus was for a while included in Centrolenella and then Cochranella, but it was resurrected in 2009. These frogs are distributed from lowlands of Central America from Honduras southwards to Pacific and Amazonian wet tropical lowlands of South America.

== Species ==
There are five species in this genus:

- Teratohyla adenocheira (Harvey and Noonan, 2005)
- Teratohyla amelie (Cisneros-Heredia and Meza-Ramos, 2007)
- Teratohyla midas (Lynch and Duellman, 1973)
- Teratohyla pulverata (Peters, 1873)
- Teratohyla spinosa (Taylor, 1949)

The AmphibiaWeb, however, places Teratohyla adenocheira in the genus Cochranella.
