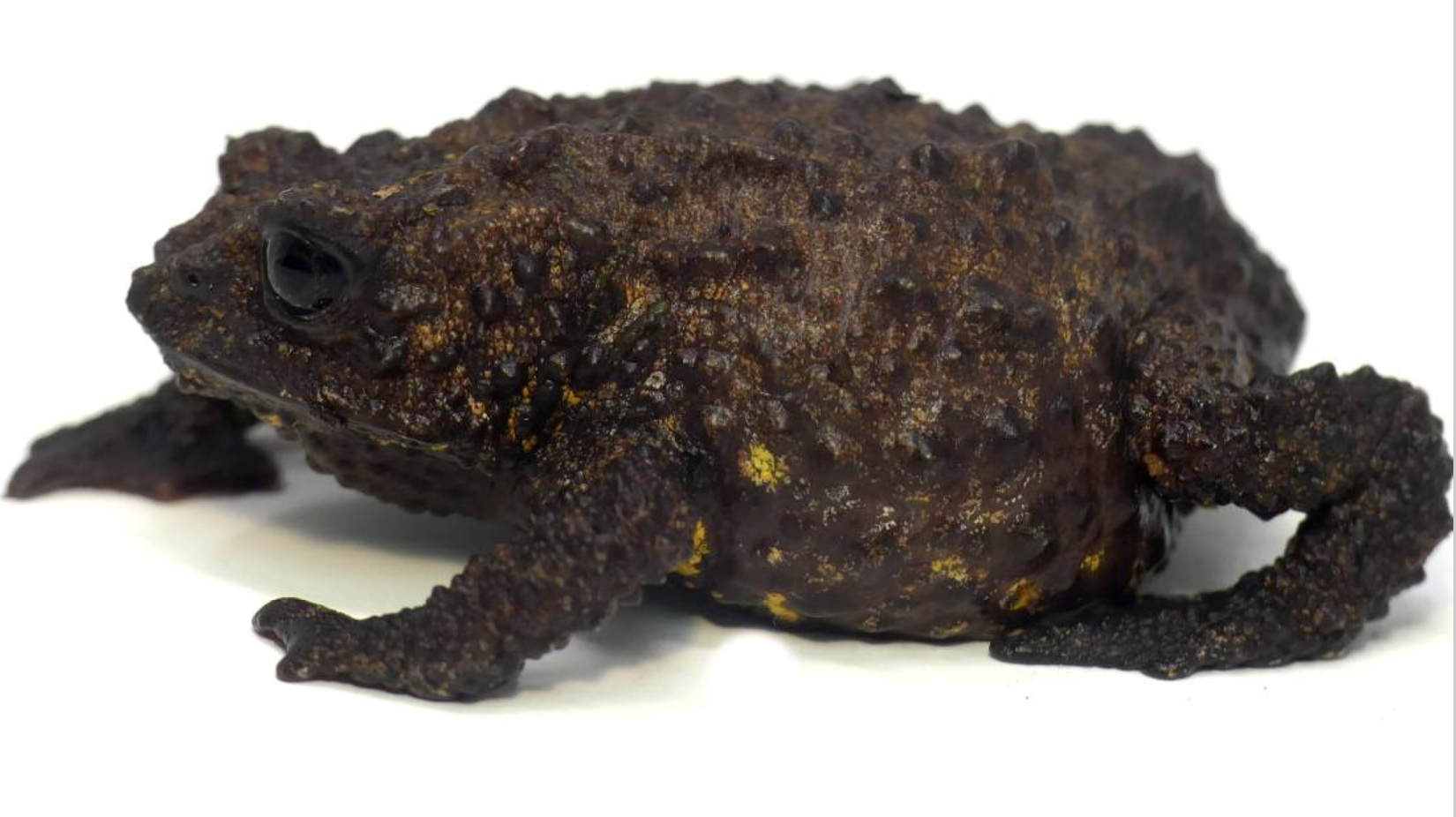

Scientific classification
- Kingdom: Animalia
- Phylum: Chordata
- Class: Amphibia
- Order: Anura
- Family: Bufonidae
- Genus: Osornophryne
- Species: O. backshalli

Binomial name
- Osornophryne backshalli Reyes-Puig, Urgilés-Merchán, Ortega-Andrade, Cisneros-Heredia, Carrión-Olmedo & Yánez-Muñoz

= Osornophryne backshalli =

Species of toad

Osornophryne backshalli, or Steve Backshall’s Andean toad, is a species of true toad. The toads are brownish olive with yellow blotches.

The species is endemic to the cloud forests of Ecuador. It was described in 2025, and named after the television presenter Steve Backshall.

== Taxonomy ==
Osornophryne backshalli was described in 2025. The holotype is an adult female, collected in 2019.

Osornophryne backshalli is closely related to Osornophryne sumacoensis.

== Distribution ==
Osornophryne backshalli is endemic to Ecuador. It is found in cloud forests, in the basin of the upper Pastaza River. The species occurs at elevations of 2,568–2,725 metres (8,425–8,940 ft), in the Ecuadorian Andes.

The known localities of the species are in protected areas.

== Description ==
On the upper side, Osornophryne backshalli is brownish-olive, with yellow and grey flecks. The underside is brownish-olive with yellow blotches. The snout has triangular papillae. The fingers and toes have extensive webbing, and the fifth toe is relatively short. The head is wider than it is long.

Osornophryne backshalli has conical and subconical warts. Osornophryne backshalli is distinguished from other species by its warts, and yellow blotches.

The species is sexually dimporphic. The snout-to-vent length is 2.2–2.9 centimetres (0.87–1.14 in) in males, and 3–3.5 centimetres (1.2–1.4 in) in females. Warts are more prevalent in males than in females. The males have nuptial pads.

== Etymology ==
Osornophryne backshalli was named after the television presenter Steve Backshall. The researchers noted his contributions to conservation, including the habitat of the species.
