= Pristimantis ernesti =

Conservation status
- Vulnerable (IUCN 3.1)

Scientific classification
- Kingdom: Animalia
- Phylum: Chordata
- Class: Amphibia
- Order: Anura
- Family: Strabomantidae
- Genus: Pristimantis
- Species: P. ernesti

Binomial name
- Pristimantis ernesti (Flores, 1987)

Synonyms
- Eleutherodactylus ernesti Flores, 1987

Species of frog

Pristimantis ernesti is a species of frog in the family Strabomantidae. It is endemic to the summit of Sumaco, a volcano in the Napo Province, Ecuador. Its common name is Ernest's robber frog. It is named after Dr. Ernst Williams, a friend and colleague of the scientist that described the species. It is a little studied species.

== Description ==
Males measure about 29 mm (1.1 in) in snout–vent length. Female size is unknown. The dorsum is coffee-coloured with dark gray markings, including a "W" mark on its upper back. Dorsal skin is glandular with prominent dorsolateral ridges.

== Habitat and conservation ==
Its natural habitat is grassland and bushland on the summit of Sumaco. Herpetological sources cite the altitude as being about 1,900 m (6,200 ft), although other sources give maximum elevation of 3,732 m (12,244 ft) to this mountain. The volcano is in the Sumaco Napo-Galeras National Park. Nevertheless, being restricted to a single location, the population is vulnerable stochastic processes.
