= Centrolene ericsmithi =

Scientific classification
- Kingdom: Animalia
- Phylum: Chordata
- Class: Amphibia
- Order: Anura
- Family: Centrolenidae
- Genus: Centrolene
- Species: C. ericsmithi

Binomial name
- Centrolene ericsmithi Cisneros-Heredia, Yánez-Muñoz, Sánchez-Nivicela & Ron

Species of amphibian

Centrolene ericsmithi is a species of frog in the family Centrolenidae. It is bright green, and has green bones and a rounded snout. The species was described in 2023, and is endemic to Ecuador.

== Taxonomy ==
Centrolene ericsmithi was described by Diego F. Cisneros-Heredia, Mario Humberto Yánez-Muñoz, Juan Carlos Sánchez-Nivicela, and Santiago R. Ron in 2023.

== Distribution ==
Centrolene ericsmithi is endemic to Ecuador. The type locality is on the southwestern slopes of the Cordillera Occidental, in Azuay Province, at an elevation of 2,950 metres (9,680 ft). Centrolene ericsmithi is syntopic with Centrolene camposi.

== Description ==
A described male measured 27.3 millimetres (1.07 in) long in snout-vent length. The back is bright green, and the underside is grainy. The bones are green. Adult males have a projecting humeral spine.

The vomer lacks a dentigerous process. The snout is rounded. The iris is flesh-coloured, and has brown lines.

Males call from leaves.

== Nomenclature ==
Centrolene ericsmithi is named for the herpetologist Eric Nelson Smith.

In English, Centrolene ericsmithi is commonly known as "Smith’s Glassfrog". In Spanish, it is known as Rana de Cristal de Smith.
