= Sumaco =

Mountain in Ecuador

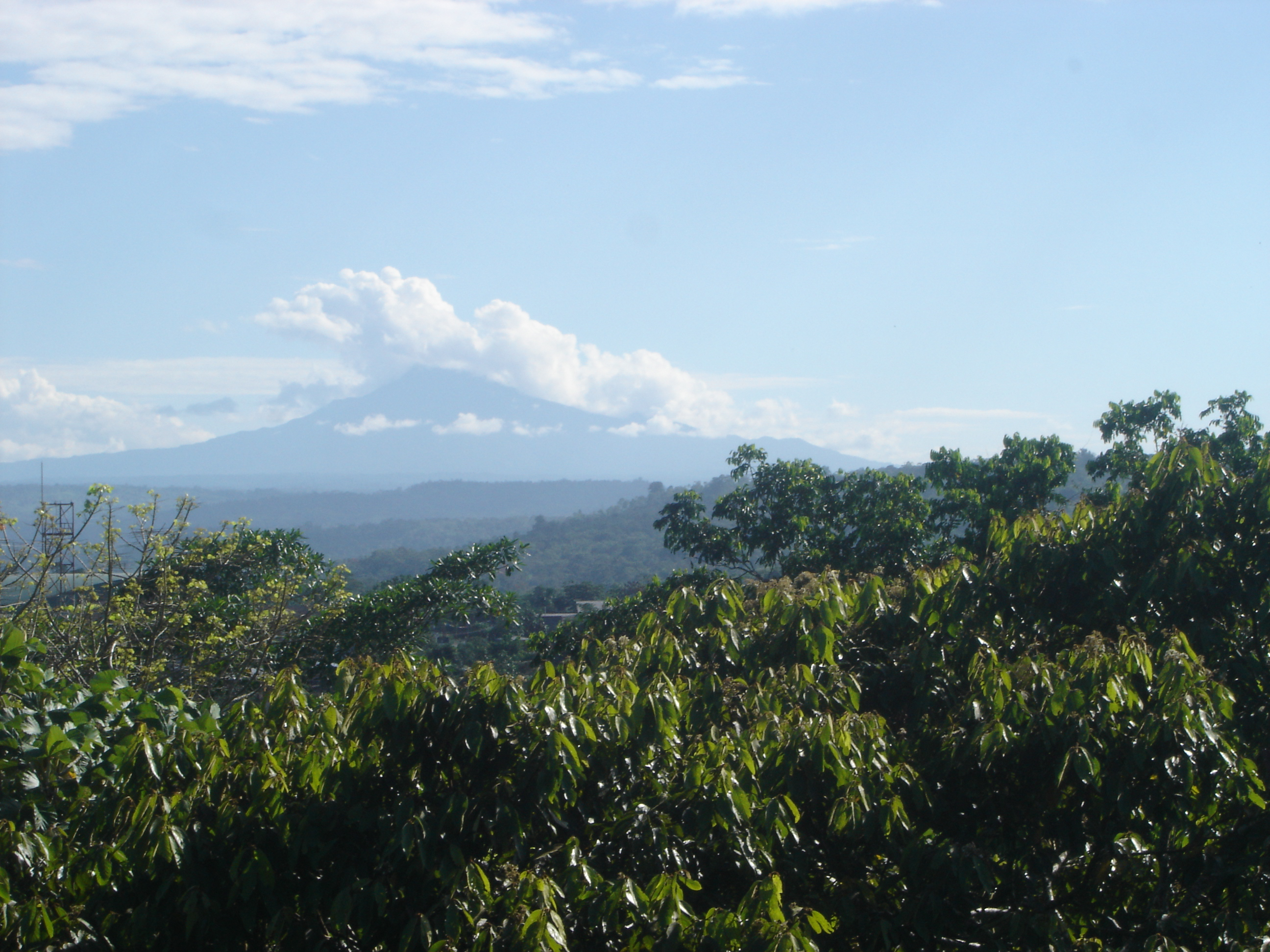
- Sumaco Volcano.

Highest point
- Elevation: 3,990 m (13,090 ft)
- Coordinates: 00°32′17″S 77°37′33″W

Geography
- Location within Ecuador
- Location: Ecuador

Geology
- Mountain type: Stratovolcano
- Last eruption: 1895 ± 30 years

Sumaco is a symmetrical, isolated stratovolcano, that is set off from the main Ecuador volcanic axis. Its rocks are very distinct from those from most Andean volcanoes because of its lack of andesitic composition, in favour of basanite and phonolitic rock. Sumaco is heavily forested and contains a small cone in its broad summit crater. An historical eruption occurred around 1895 (± 30 years).

== Ecology ==
Sumaco is isolated from the Cordillera Oriental by the lowland valley of the Cosanga and Quijos Rivers. There are more than 6000 species of vascular plants, including more than 90 endemic species. There are also a number of endemic animals, including toad Osornophryne sumacoensis only known from the eastern slopes of Sumaco, and robber frog Pristimantis ernesti only known from the summit of Sumaco.
