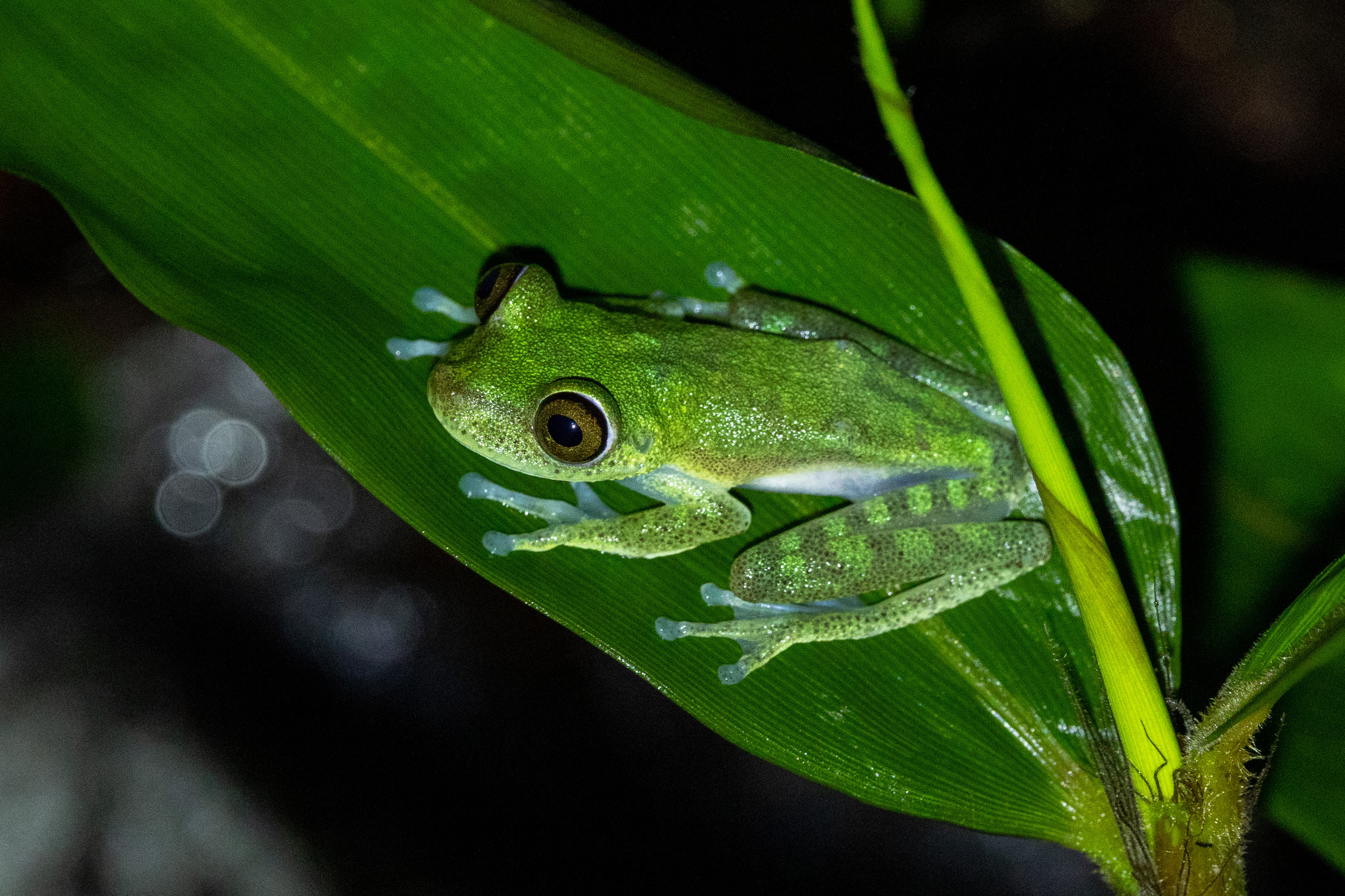

Conservation status
- Least Concern (IUCN 3.1)

Scientific classification
- Kingdom: Animalia
- Phylum: Chordata
- Class: Amphibia
- Order: Anura
- Family: Hylidae
- Genus: Boana
- Species: B. nympha

Binomial name
- Boana nympha (Faivovich, Moravec, Cisneros-Heredia, and Köhler, 2006)

Synonyms
- Hypsiboas nympha Faivovich et al., 2006

= Boana nympha =

Species of frog

Boana nympha is a species of frog in the family Hylidae. It is endemic to the upper Amazon basin of southern Colombia, eastern Ecuador, and northeastern Peru; its range probably extends into adjacent western Brazil. The specific name nympha alludes to nymphs, beautiful wood- and marsh-dwelling goddesses in Greek mythology. Common name nympha Amazon treefrog has been proposed for it.

== Description ==
Adult males measure 24–31 mm (0.9–1.2 in) and adult females 26–36 mm (1.0–1.4 in) in snout–vent length. The head is wider than the slender body. The snout is rounded in dorsal view and protruding in lateral view. The eyes are big and protuberant. The tympanum is small. The limbs are long and slender. The fingers are about one-fourth webbed and the toes about three-fifths webbed. The upper surfaces are light yellowish green. There is a distinct X-shaped gray marking on the dorsum, a gray horizontal line in the sacral region, a gray interocular line, and a dark canthal stripe. There are dark anterior lateral stripes between the dorsum and the flanks. The dorsal surfaces of the limbs have weakly defined, irregular transversal bars. The throat is greenish cream. The venter and ventral surfaces of the limbs are translucent greenish white. The iris is creamy golden with broad black periphery. Males have a single subgular vocal sac.

== Habitat and conservation ==
Boana nympha occurs in primary lowland forests, including swampy areas, at elevations of 70–600 m (230–1,970 ft) above sea level. Most records are from seasonally flooded forests, but it can also be found in non-flooded (terra firme) forests. It probably has aquatic tadpoles.

Although this species is not threatened overall, parts of its range are severely affected by deforestation. Residues of oil extraction are a local threat. However, this species is present in a number of protected areas.
