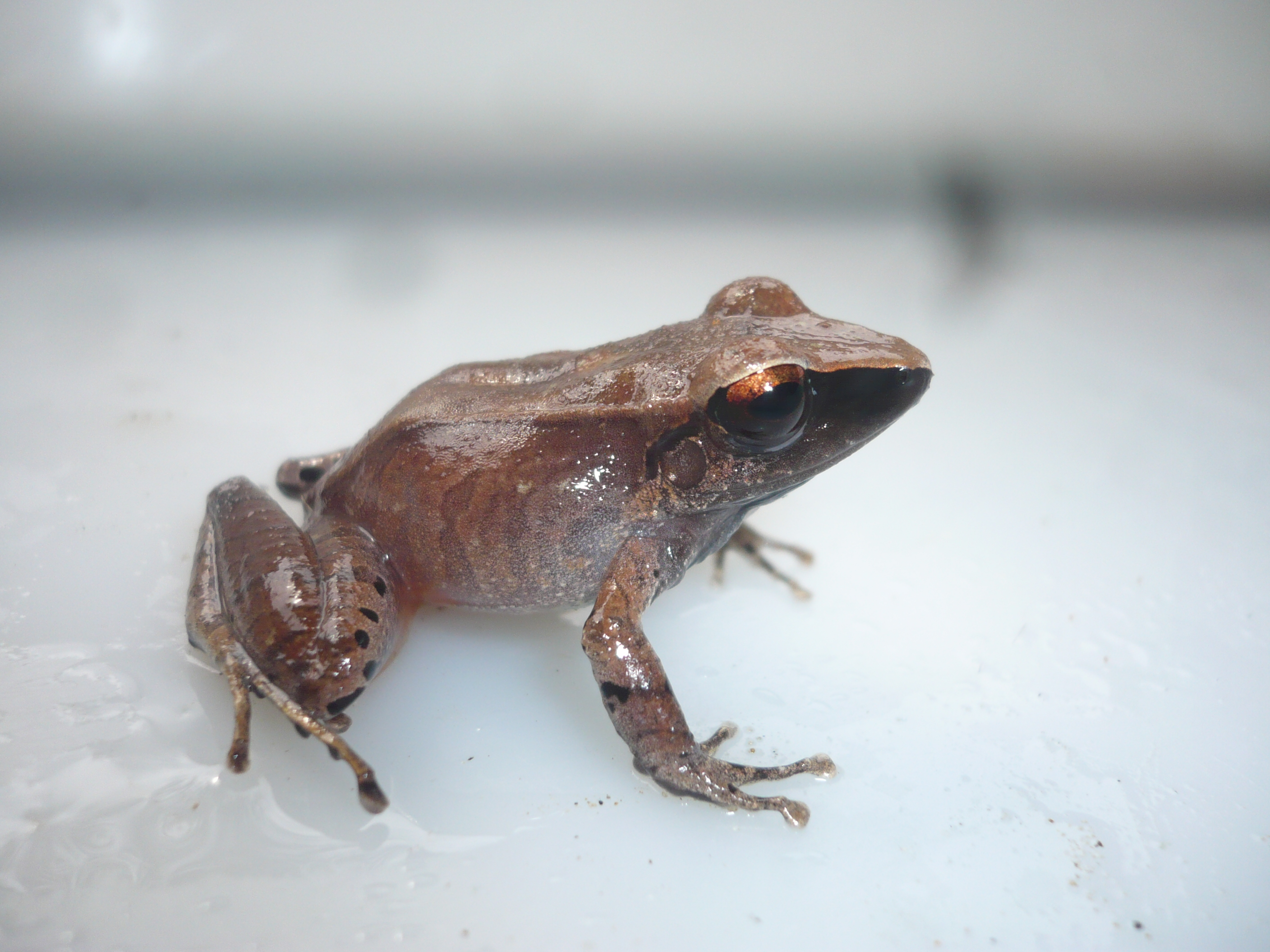

Conservation status
- Least Concern (IUCN 3.1)

Scientific classification
- Kingdom: Animalia
- Phylum: Chordata
- Class: Amphibia
- Order: Anura
- Clade: Brachycephaloidea
- Family: Craugastoridae
- Genus: Pristimantis
- Species: P. buccinator

Binomial name
- Pristimantis buccinator (Rodrìguez, 1994)

Synonyms
- Eleutherodactylus buccinator Rodrìguez, 1994

= Pristimantis buccinator =

Species of frog

Pristimantis buccinator is a species of frog in the family Strabomantidae. It is found in Peru, and possibly Brazil and Bolivia. Its natural habitat is tropical moist lowland forests.
