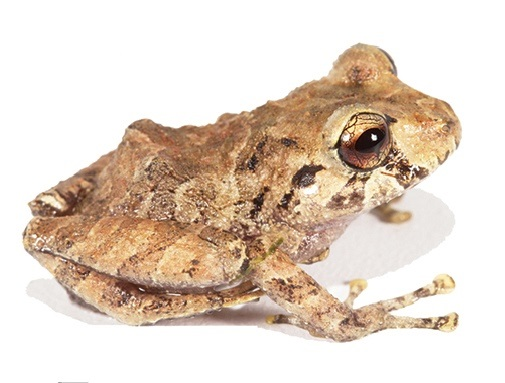
- Mature female

Scientific classification
- Kingdom: Animalia
- Phylum: Chordata
- Class: Amphibia
- Order: Anura
- Clade: Brachycephaloidea
- Family: Craugastoridae
- Genus: Pristimantis
- Species: P. mallii

Binomial name
- Pristimantis mallii Reyes-Puig, Reyes-Puig, Velarde-Garcéz, Dávalos, Mancero, Navarrete, Yánez-Muñoz, Cisneros-Heredia, and Ron, 2019
- Pristimantis mallii is only known from the Río Zuñag Reserve in the Andes of Ecuador

= Pristimantis mallii =

Species of frog

Pristimantis mallii is a species of frog in the family Strabomantidae. It is endemic to Ecuador. Described in 2019, it is only known from the Río Zuñag Reserve on the eastern slope of the Andes, in the upper basin of the Pastaza River. The specific name mallii honors V. N. Mallikarjuna "Malli" Rao, winner of Lavoisier Medal who helped develop an environmentally safe alternative to the fluorocarbons and whose donation helped establish the Río Zuñag Reserve. Common name Malli's rain frog has been coined for this species.

== Description ==
Adult males measure 12–21 mm (0.5–0.8 in) and adult females 23–43 mm (0.9–1.7 in) in snout–vent length. The snout is broadly rounded in dorsal view. The tympanum is visible, albeit slightly covered by the supratympanic fold. The fingers have narrow lateral fringes and terminal discs. The toes have slightly defined lateral fringes and terminal discs; no webbing is present. The upper eyelids bear 1–2 subconical tubercles and some rounded tubercles. The skin on the dorsum and flanks are shagreen. Scapular folds are distinctive. The dorsum and flanks light are brown to brown. There are irregular dark brown marks bounded by dirty or greenish cream or light brown. The groin has irregular yellowish marks. The venter is light gray or cream spotted with brown. The iris is golden coppery with black reticulations and a reddish horizontal stripe.

== Habitat and conservation ==
Pristimantis mallii is known from the montane cloud forests of the east-central slope of the Andes at elevations of 1,300–2,190 m (4,270–7,190 ft) above sea level. All specimens were found in herbaceous and shrub vegetation inside mature forest some 1.5–4 m (4 ft 11 in – 13 ft 1 in) above the ground.

The Río Zuñag Reserve is located in the buffer zone of the Llanganates National Park.
