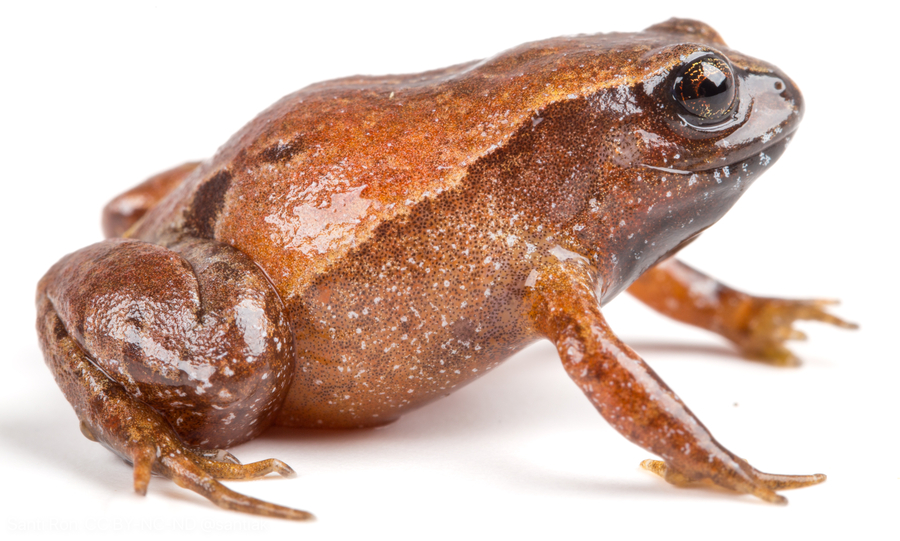

Conservation status
- Data Deficient (IUCN 3.1)

Scientific classification
- Kingdom: Animalia
- Phylum: Chordata
- Class: Amphibia
- Order: Anura
- Family: Strabomantidae
- Subfamily: Holoadeninae
- Genus: Urkuphryne
- Species: U. merinoi

Binomial name
- Urkuphryne merinoi Ortega et al., 2025

= Urkuphryne =

Genus of frogs

Urkuphryne, also known as the Merino leaflitter frog, is a monotypic genus of frogs in the family Strabomantidae. It is endemic to the Cerro Golondrinas forest area of northern Ecuador. Phylogenetic analyses have recovered Urkuphryne as the sister taxon to the smaller Phyllonastes within the subfamily Holoadeninae. Autapomorphic characters of this taxon include reduced distal expansions of the fingers and toes and the presence of protruding vomerine teeth. Like other brachycephaloid frogs, Urkuphryne individuals mature via direct development, meaning that they do not go through metamorphosis or have tadpoles; instead, hatchlings demonstrate adult features and proportions.
