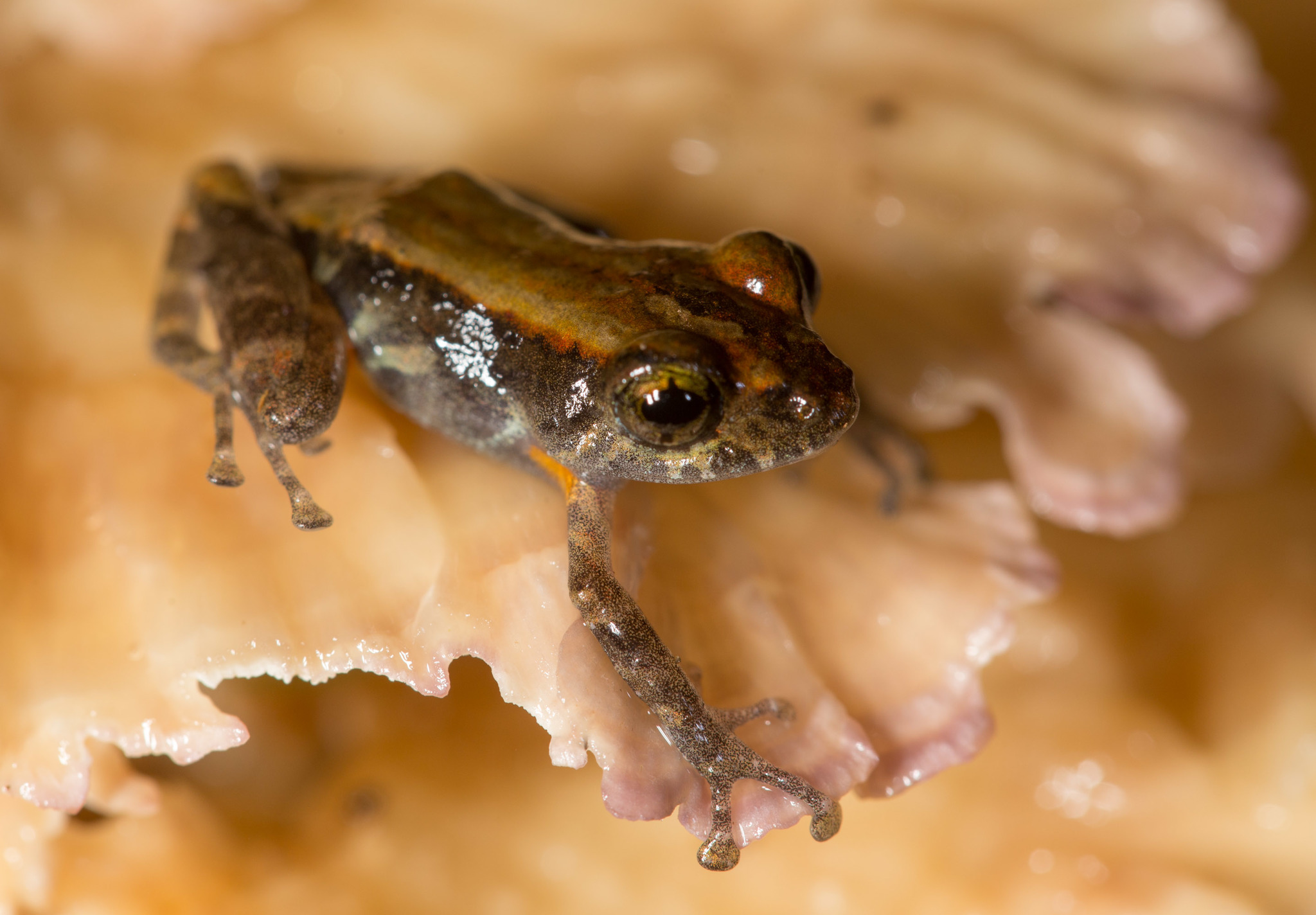

Conservation status
- Least Concern (IUCN 3.1)

Scientific classification
- Kingdom: Animalia
- Phylum: Chordata
- Class: Amphibia
- Order: Anura
- Family: Strabomantidae
- Genus: Pristimantis
- Species: P. ventrimarmoratus

Binomial name
- Pristimantis ventrimarmoratus (Boulenger, 1912)

Synonyms
- Eleutherodactylus ventrimarmoratus (Boulenger, 1912); Eleutherodactylus ventrivittatus Andersson, 1945

= Pristimantis ventrimarmoratus =

Species of frog

Pristimantis ventrimarmoratus is a species of frog in the family Strabomantidae. It is found in Bolivia, Ecuador, Peru, and possibly Brazil. Its natural habitats are tropical moist lowland forests, swamps, and moist montane forests.
