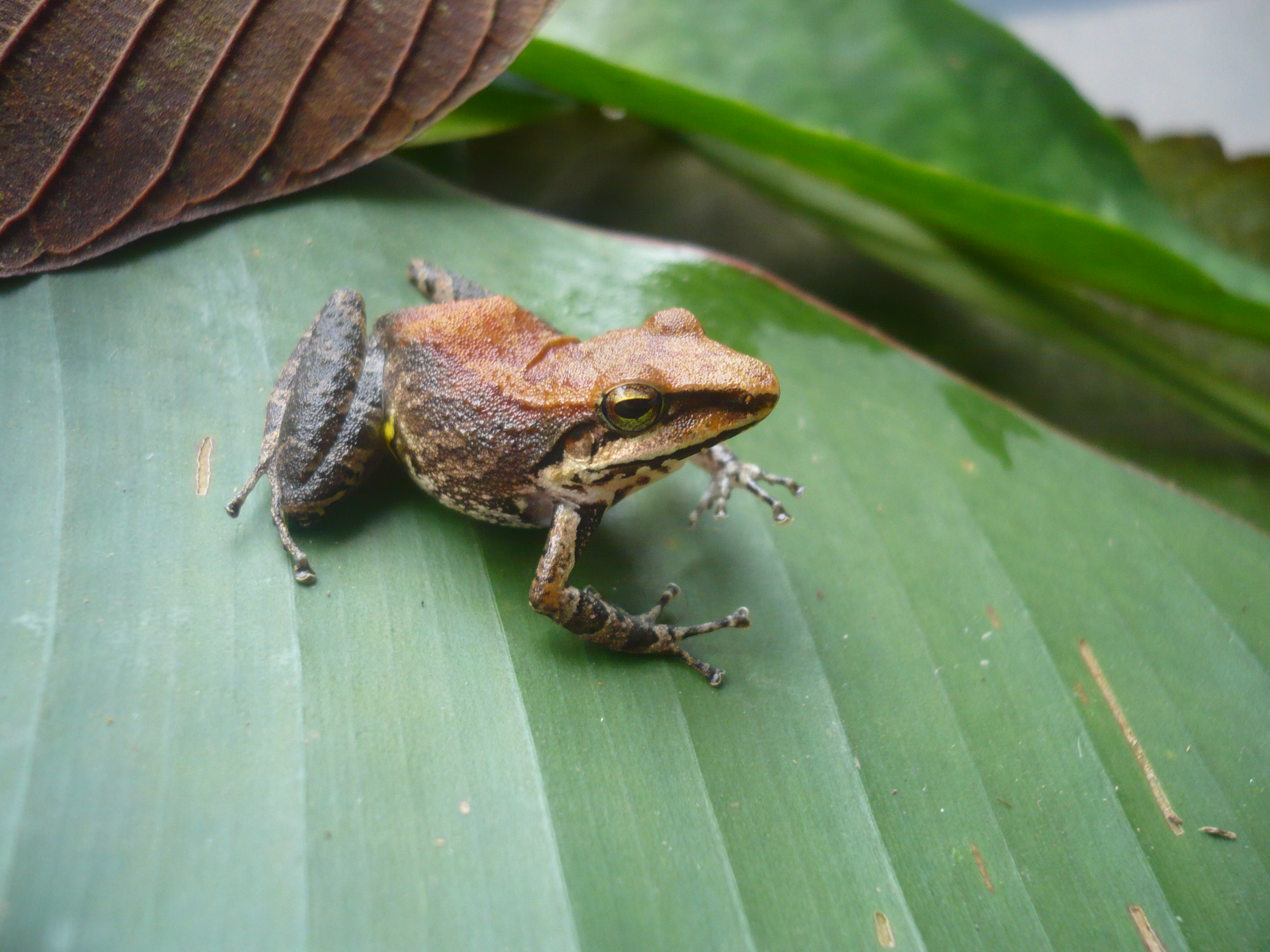

Conservation status
- Least Concern (IUCN 3.1)

Scientific classification
- Kingdom: Animalia
- Phylum: Chordata
- Class: Amphibia
- Order: Anura
- Family: Strabomantidae
- Genus: Pristimantis
- Species: P. toftae

Binomial name
- Pristimantis toftae (Duellman, 1978)

Synonyms
- Eleutherodactylus toftae Duellman, 1978

= Pristimantis toftae =

Species of frog

Pristimantis toftae is a species of frog in the family Strabomantidae. It is found in Bolivia, Brazil, and Peru. Its natural habitat is tropical moist lowland forests. It is threatened by habitat loss.
