= Romopelma =

Scientific classification
- Kingdom: Animalia
- Phylum: Arthropoda
- Subphylum: Chelicerata
- Class: Arachnida
- Order: Araneae
- Infraorder: Mygalomorphae
- Family: Theraphosidae
- Genus: Romopelma; Peñaherrera-R., Pinos-Sanchez, Guerrero-Campoverde, León-E. & Cisneros-Heredia, 2024
- Species: R. barrigae

Binomial name
- Romopelma barrigae Peñaherrera-R., Pinos-Sanchez, Guerrero-Campoverde, León-E. & Cisneros-Heredia, 2024

Species of spider

Romopelma is a monotypic genus of tarantulas in the family Theraphosidae, containing the single species Romopelma barrigae.

== Distribution ==
Romopelma barrigae is endemic to the Northwestern Andes of Ecuador.

== Etymology ==
The Romopelma genus was named after David Fernando Romo Vallejo, a professor and educator from Quito, Ecuador, combined with the common ending for tarantual genera "-pelma". The specific species Romopelma barrigae was named for his wife Consuelo Barriga, the long-time administrator of the Tiputini Biodiversity Station in Ecuador.
