= Colombiarachne =

Scientific classification
- Kingdom: Animalia
- Phylum: Arthropoda
- Subphylum: Chelicerata
- Class: Arachnida
- Order: Araneae
- Infraorder: Mygalomorphae
- Family: Theraphosidae
- Genus: Colombiarachne; Sherwood, Gabriel, Peñaherrera-R., Guerrero-Campoverde, León-E., Mora-Bolaños, Ríos-Tamayo & Cisneros-Heredia, 2025
- Species: C. dianae

Binomial name
- Colombiarachne dianae Sherwood, Gabriel & Peñaherrera-R., 2025

Species of spider

Colombiarachne is a monotypic genus of spiders in the family Theraphosidae containing the single species, Colombiarachne dianae.

== Distribution ==
Colombiarachne dianae is endemic to the Pacific lowlands of Colombia.

== Etymology ==
The genus name is a combination of "Colombia" and "arachne" (spider). C. dianae honors Colombian zoologist Diana Arzuza Buelvas.
