= Vitriemboli =

Scientific classification
- Kingdom: Animalia
- Phylum: Arthropoda
- Subphylum: Chelicerata
- Class: Arachnida
- Order: Araneae
- Infraorder: Mygalomorphae
- Family: Theraphosidae
- Genus: Vitriemboli; Peñaherrera-R., Ríos-Tamayo, Sherwood, Gabriel, Guerrero-Campoverde, León-E., Mora-Bolaños & Cisneros-Heredia, 2025

Type species
- V. diaguita Ríos-Tamayo, Peñaherrera-R., Sherwood, Guerrero-Campoverde, León-E., Mora-Bolaños, Gabriel & Cisneros-Heredia, 2025

Species
- 2, see text

Genus of spiders

Vitriemboli is a genus of spiders in the family Theraphosidae.

== Distribution ==
The genus Vitriemboli is found in Argentina and Bolivia.

== Etymology ==
The genus name is a combination of Latin vitreus "glass" and embolus, referring to the Prince Rupert's drop shape of the male palpal bulb. V. diaguita honors the indigenous Diaguita people. V. herzogi honors ornithologist Sebastian K. Herzog, one of the collectors.

== Species ==
As of January 2026, this genus includes two species:

- Vitriemboli diaguita Ríos-Tamayo, Peñaherrera-R., Sherwood, Guerrero-Campoverde, León-E., Mora-Bolaños, Gabriel & Cisneros-Heredia, 2025 – Argentina
- Vitriemboli herzogi (Gabriel, Sherwood & Pérez-Miles, 2023) – Bolivia
