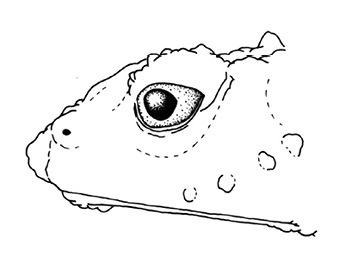
- Head shape in lateral view of female Osornophryne guacamayo

Conservation status
- Vulnerable (IUCN 3.1)

Scientific classification
- Kingdom: Animalia
- Phylum: Chordata
- Class: Amphibia
- Order: Anura
- Family: Bufonidae
- Genus: Osornophryne
- Species: O. guacamayo

Binomial name
- Osornophryne guacamayo Hoogmoed, 1987

= Guacamayo plump toad =

Species of toad

The Guacamayo plump toad or sapo de Guacamayo (Osornophryne guacamayo) is a species of toad in the family Bufonidae. It occurs in the montane forests of Colombia and Ecuador. The species was named after guacamayo, the Ecuadorian word for a macaw.

== Description ==
The maximum snout-vent length is 40.7 millimetres (1.60 in) in females, and 23.5 millimetres (0.93 in) in males. The dorsum and flanks are smooth, and the eyelids have many warts.

The dorsum is dark brown to black, and may have yellow or pale brown stripes. In males, the underside is pale to dark brown, and has yellow warts. In females, the underside is yellow with black spots, or black with yellow spots.

The feet are red to brown. The iris is black, and has a reddish-gold ring.

== Behaviour ==
At night, the toadlets perch on low vegetation, tree roots, and tree trunks. They have been found on ferns, bromeliads, and epiphytes. The call is a soft trill, with around seventeen pulses.

Its diet includes a wide variety of invertebrates, including ants, beetles, and orthoptera. The toads may forage on the ground.

The toads reproduce by direct development. Females lay thirty-fine to fifty unpigmented eggs. Juveniles have been found during June and August.

== Habitat ==
The Guacamayo plump toad's natural habitat is subtropical or tropical moist montane forests. It is currently threatened by habitat loss, and has a fragmented distribution.

The species may be adapted for locomotion in rocky habitats. The type series of O. guacamayo was collected on “moss in rock crevices” in the Andes mountains.

== Etymology ==
The species' scientific name is derived from guacamayo, the Ecuadorian name for a macaw. The name refers to the toad's colours, and its type locality.
