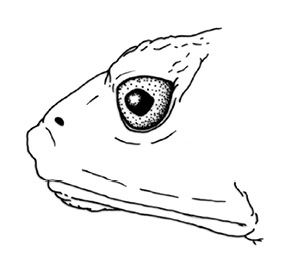
- Head shape in lateral view of Osornophryne sumacoensis female

Conservation status
- Vulnerable (IUCN 3.1)

Scientific classification
- Kingdom: Animalia
- Phylum: Chordata
- Class: Amphibia
- Order: Anura
- Family: Bufonidae
- Genus: Osornophryne
- Species: O. sumacoensis

Binomial name
- Osornophryne sumacoensis Gluesenkamp, 1995

= Osornophryne sumacoensis =

Species of amphibian

Osornophryne sumacoensis is a species of toad in the family Bufonidae. It is endemic to Ecuador and only found in the forests surrounding a small crater lake on the eastern slopes of Sumaco, a volcano in the Napo Province.

== Description ==
Osornophryne sumacoensis females measure about 32.5 mm (1.28 in) in snout–vent length (mean of three individuals). The skin has many tubercles. The back and limbs are blueish-black, and the belly is blue with black spots. The head is small.

Osornophryne sumacoensis can be active during both the day and the night. It is a terrestrial species. During the daytime, specimens have been found under leaf-litter.

== Reproduction ==
Osornophryne sumacoensis has direct development. Eggs are laid on soil under vegetation.

== Habitat and conservation ==
Osornophryne sumacoensis inhabits the cloud forest surrounding the lake, at 2,500–2,800 m (8,200–9,200 ft) asl. The forest is dominated by bamboo (Chusquea sp.), Ficus, and other trees up to 20 m (66 ft) tall.

The species lives within the Sumaco Napo-Galeras National Park. Volcanic eruption is a threat to this species, which is restricted to a single location.
