= Cochran frog (disambiguation) =

The Cochran frog (Nymphargus cochranae) is a frog in the family Centrolenidae found in the lower Amazonian slopes of the Cordillera Occidental of Ecuador and adjacent Colombia.

Cochran frog may also refer to various frogs in the family Centrolenidae:

- Alban Cochran frog (Centrolene daidaleum), a frog found in Colombia and Venezuela
- Caqueta Cochran frog (Nymphargus oreonympha), a frog endemic to Colombia
- Grainy Cochran frog (Cochranella granulosa), a frog found in Costa Rica, Honduras, Nicaragua, and Panama
- Lonely Cochran frog (Centrolene solitaria), a frog endemic to Colombia
- Peru Cochran frog (Nymphargus chancas), a frog endemic to Peru
- Ruiz's Cochran frog (Nymphargus ruizi), a frog endemic to Colombia
- Santa Cecilia Cochran frog (Teratohyla midas), a frog found in Brazil, Ecuador, Peru, and Colombia
- Spiny Cochran frog (Teratohyla spinosa), a frog found in Colombia, Costa Rica, Ecuador, Honduras, Panama, and Nicaragua
- Spotted Cochran frog (Nymphargus ocellatus), a frog endemic to the Amazonian slopes of Andes in Peru
