= Cochranella guayasamini =

Conservation status
- Least Concern (IUCN 3.1)
- CITES Appendix II

Scientific classification
- Kingdom: Animalia
- Phylum: Chordata
- Class: Amphibia
- Order: Anura
- Family: Centrolenidae
- Genus: Cochranella
- Species: C. guayasamini

Binomial name
- Cochranella guayasamini Twomey, Delia, and Castroviejo-Fisher, 2014

Species of amphibian

Cochranella guayasamini is a species of frog in the family Centrolenidae. It is greenish-yellow, with green bones. The tadpoles are elongated and reddish. The species is endemic to Peru.

Cochranella guayasamini was described in 2014, and is listed as of Least Concern by the IUCN.

== Taxonomy ==
Cochranella guayasamini was described in 2014, by Evan Twomey, Jesse Delia, and Santiago Castroviejo-Fisher. It was formerly confused with Cochranella croceopodes, which was later synonymised with Rulyrana saxiscandens.

The holotype is an adult male collected in 2010.

== Distribution ==
Cochranella guayasamini is endemic to Peru, and is present in San Martín and Amazonas. It is found in primary forests and highly disturbed areas. The species is found at elevations of 250–1,150 metres (820–3,770 ft). Its extent of occurrence is around 9,231 square kilometres (3,564 sq mi).

Cochranella guayasamini is sympatric with Nymphargus chancas, Espadarana audax, Hyalinobatrachium pellucidum, Hyalinobatrachium carlesvilai, Chimerella corleone, Teratohyla midas, and Chimerella mariaelenae.

== Description ==
Adult males measure 22.5–24.5 millimetres (0.89–0.96 in) in snout-vent length. The back is green with yellow tones, and has small melanophores. The dorsum and flanks are smooth. The thighs are coarsely areolate. The hands and feet are yellowish-green, and the fingers and toes are yellowish. Adult males have a small humeral spine. The nuptial pad is unpigmented.

The snout is rounded dorsally, and rounded in profile. The upper lip is white. The tympanum is visible. The vomer has teeth. The rim of the eyelid is bright yellow. The iris is reddish-bronze, with black lines and grey or black spots, and is surrounded by a black ring.

The bones are green. The front half of the parietal peritoneum is white, and the back half is transparent. The pericardium is white. The other peritonea are mostly transparent, with some iridophores.

Males deliver a buzz-like call from leaves. One male appears to act as the leader of a "chorus" in groups of calling males. Females deposit clutches of sixteen to thirty-eight eggs on the upper surfaces of leaves along streams. The eggs are golden yellow, and encased in a clear jelly.

The tadpoles are elongated, and have a spiracle on the left side. Upon hatching, the tadpoles are translucent and reddish-gold. They turn pinkish-red as they develop. Upon metamorphosis, they turn green.

== Conservation ==
In 2018, the IUCN assessed Cochranella guayasamini as of Least Concern. The species is not thought to face any significant threats, and is present in Cordillera Azul National Park.

Cochranella guayasamini is listed in Appendix II of CITES. There are no quotas or suspensions in place for the species.

== Etymology ==
Cochranella guayasamini is named after Juan Manuel Guayasamin, recognising his work on glass frogs and friendship with the describing authors.
