= Chimerella corleone =

Conservation status
- Data Deficient (IUCN 3.1)

Scientific classification
- Kingdom: Animalia
- Phylum: Chordata
- Class: Amphibia
- Order: Anura
- Family: Centrolenidae
- Genus: Chimerella
- Species: C. corleone

Binomial name
- Chimerella corleone Twomey, Delia, and Castroviejo-Fisher, 2014

Species of amphibian

Chimerella corleone, the Cainarachi glass frog, is a species of frog in the family Centrolenidae. It is green and has a silvery-white iris. The males are 1.88–2 centimetres (0.74–0.79 in) long, and the females are around 2.1 centimetres (0.83 in) long. The species is native to Peru.

Chimerella corleone was described in 2014, and is listed as Data Deficient by the IUCN.

== Taxonomy ==
Chimerella corleone was described in 2014, by Evan Twomey, Jesse Delia, and Santiago Castroviejo-Fisher. It was the second species of Chimerella to be identified, after Chimerella mariaelenae.

The holotype is an adult male collected in 2011.

== Distribution ==
Chimerella corleone is found in Peru's Department of San Martín, at elevations of around 610 metres (2,000 ft). It is known only from the type locality.

The species is found on vegetation along rock walls in the spray zones of waterfalls. It is found in the same area as Cochranella guayasamini, Cochranella resplendens, Hyalinobatrachium carlesvilai, Hyalinobatrachium pellucidum, Rulyrana saxiscandens, and Teratohyla midas.

== Description ==
The back is green, with yellowish-green flecks and dark melanophores. The dorsal skin is shagreened, and the ventral skin is grainy. The hands and feet are light green, and the fingers and toes are pale orange at the tips. The prepollex is concealed. The vomer lacks teeth. The snout is dorsally truncated, and laterally rounded. The tympanum is evident. The iris is silvery white, and has dark grey lines.

The bones are green. The parietal peritoneum is transparent, and the pericardial peritoneum is white. The liver is bulbous. The male snout-vent length is 1.88–2 centimetres (0.74–0.79 in), and the female snout-vent length is around 2.1 centimetres (0.83 in).

The males have humeral spines and nuptial pads. The males call from plants 2–4 metres (6.6–13.1 ft) above the ground. The call consists of two high pitched notes, and lasts for 0.39 seconds. The eggs are enclosed in a smoky jelly.

== Conservation ==
In 2018, the IUCN assessed Chimerella corleone as Data Deficient.

== Nomenclature ==
Chimerella corleone is commonly known as the "Cainarachi glass frog". The specific epithet corleone is a reference to the Corleone family from The Godfather.
