= Chimerella mira =

Scientific classification
- Kingdom: Animalia
- Phylum: Chordata
- Class: Amphibia
- Order: Anura
- Family: Centrolenidae
- Genus: Chimerella
- Species: C. mira

Binomial name
- Chimerella mira Köhler, Venegas, Castillo-Urbina, Glaw, Aguilar-Puntriano, and Vences, 2023

Species of amphibian

Chimerella mira is a species of frog in the family Centrolenidae. It is relatively small, light yellow-green, and has a pale iris with black spots. The species is endemic to Peru, and was described in 2023.

== Taxonomy ==
Chimerella mira was described in 2023 by Jörn Köhler, Pablo J. Venegas, Ernesto Castillo-Urbina, Frank Glaw, César Augusto Aguilar Puntriano, and Miguel Vences.

The type locality is in Leoncio Prado province, Peru.

== Distribution ==
Chimerella mira is endemic to Peru. It is found in swampy and temporarily flooded areas. It has the southern-most range of any Chimerella species.

Chimerella mira occurs sympatrically with Boana lanciformis, Leptodactylus griseigularis, and Adenomera.

== Description ==
Chimerella mira is relatively small, and has slender limbs and large eyes. Two adult male specimens are 18.1 millimetres (0.71 in) and 19.6 millimetres (0.77 in) long. The size of females is unknown.

The snout is truncated dorsally and laterally. The space between the nostrils is concave. The space between the eyes and nostrils is concave. The canthus is well-defined, and straight in the dorsal view. The tympanum is round and entirely visible. The lips have a narrow tan line. The pupils are horizontal. The iris is pale and has small black spots.

The dorsal skin is shagreened, the throat is smooth, and the ventral side is grainy. The back is light yellow-green, with small yellowish flecks. The ventral surface is transparent.

A humeral spine is present in males. The prepollex is concealed. There are no nuptial pads. The hands and feet are yellow-green.

The call consists of multi-pulsed "Trii" notes. Males are thought to fight each other.

== Etymology ==
The specific epithet mira is a Latin adjective meaning "surprising." It refers to the fact that samples of the species were originally thought to be Chimerella corleone.
