= Nymphargus dajomesae =

Scientific classification
- Kingdom: Animalia
- Phylum: Chordata
- Class: Amphibia
- Order: Anura
- Family: Centrolenidae
- Genus: Nymphargus
- Species: N. dajomesae

Binomial name
- Nymphargus dajomesae Masache-Sarango, Cisneros-Heredia, and Ron, 2026

Species of amphibian

Nymphargus dajomesae, commonly known as Dajomes glassfrog, is a species of frog in the family Centrolenidae. The body is yellowish-green to dark-green, and parts of the peritonea are white. The species is endemic to Ecuador.

Nymphargus dajomesae was described in 2026, and named after Neisi Dájomes, an Ecuadorian weightlifter.

== Taxonomy and evolution ==
Nymphargus dajomesae was described in 2026, by Mylena V. Masache-Sarango, Diego F. Cisneros-Heredia, and Santiago R. Ron. The holotype is an adult male, and was collected in 2017.

Nymphargus dajomesae is the sister species to a species that has not yet been described. It belongs to a clade that includes Nymphargus buenaventura, Nymphargus cariticommatus, Nymphargus griffithsi, Nymphargus lasgralarias, Nymphargus sucre, and Nymphargus wileyi.

Nymphargus dajomesae is thought to have evolved around 4.5 million years ago, during the Pliocene.

== Distribution ==
Nymphargus dajomesae is endemic to Ecuador. It has only been found on the Cordillera del Cóndor, in El Quimi Biological Reserve, at elevations of 1,992–2,090 metres (6,535–6,857 ft), though other populations may exist. The type locality is in montane forest.

== Description ==
The dorsum is yellowish-green to dark green. The fingers and toes are yellow. The underside is grainy. Parts of the peritonea are white, and cover the heart, oesophagus, kidneys, and stomach. The bones are green.

The adult males are 20.8–27.2 millimetres (0.82–1.07 in) long, and lack humeral spines.

The snout is truncated. The region between the eyes and nostrils is slightly concave. The iris is tan to greyish-tan, with black lines, and a pale yellow ring around the pupil. The vomer lacks teeth.

The call is a single repeated click.

== Nomenclature ==
The specific epithet dajomesae is a noun in the genitive case. It honours Neisi Dájomes, an Ecuadorian weightlifter. Author Diego F. Cisneros-Heredia described the species as "a symbol of how science and society can recognize and celebrate women shaping the future."

In English, Nymphargus dajomesae is commonly known as "Dajomes Glassfrog". In Spanish, it is known as Rana de cristal de Dajomes.
