= Nymphargus nephelophila =

Conservation status
- Data Deficient (IUCN 3.1)

Scientific classification
- Kingdom: Animalia
- Phylum: Chordata
- Class: Amphibia
- Order: Anura
- Family: Centrolenidae
- Genus: Nymphargus
- Species: N. nephelophila

Binomial name
- Nymphargus nephelophila (Ruíz-Carranza & Lynch, 1991)

Synonyms
- Cochranella nephelophila Ruíz-Carranza & Lynch, 1991

Species of amphibian

Nymphargus nephelophila (common name: Florencia Cochran frog) is a species of frogs in the family Centrolenidae, formerly placed in Cochranella. It is endemic to the Caquetá Department, Colombia, where it is known from the eastern versant of the Cordillera Oriental near Florencia. Its natural habitat is vegetation near streams in cloud forest, including secondary forest. Habitat loss is a threat to this species, but it is too little known to assess its conservation status.

Nymphargus nephelophila lay the eggs on leaves overhanging water; when the tadpoles hatch they drop into the water below where they develop further. Adult males measure 23–24 mm (0.91–0.94 in) in snout–vent length. The snout is truncate and dorsal skin is smooth with diminutive tubercles.
