= Nymphargus luminosus =

Conservation status
- Endangered (IUCN 3.1)

Scientific classification
- Kingdom: Animalia
- Phylum: Chordata
- Class: Amphibia
- Order: Anura
- Family: Centrolenidae
- Genus: Nymphargus
- Species: N. luminosus

Binomial name
- Nymphargus luminosus (Ruíz-Carranza & Lynch, 1995)

Synonyms
- Cochranella luminosa; Nymphargus luminosa

Species of frog

Nymphargus luminosus is a species of frog in the family Centrolenidae, formerly placed in Cochranella. It is endemic to Colombia. Its natural habitats are subtropical or tropical moist montane forests and rivers. It is threatened by habitat loss.
