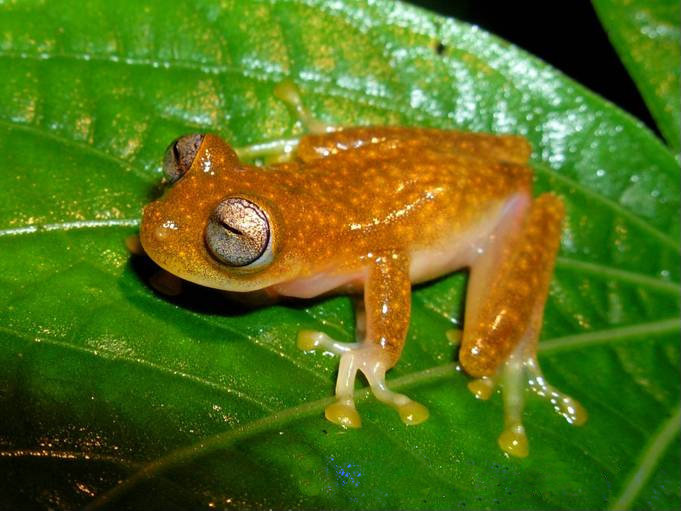
- Nymphargus rosada
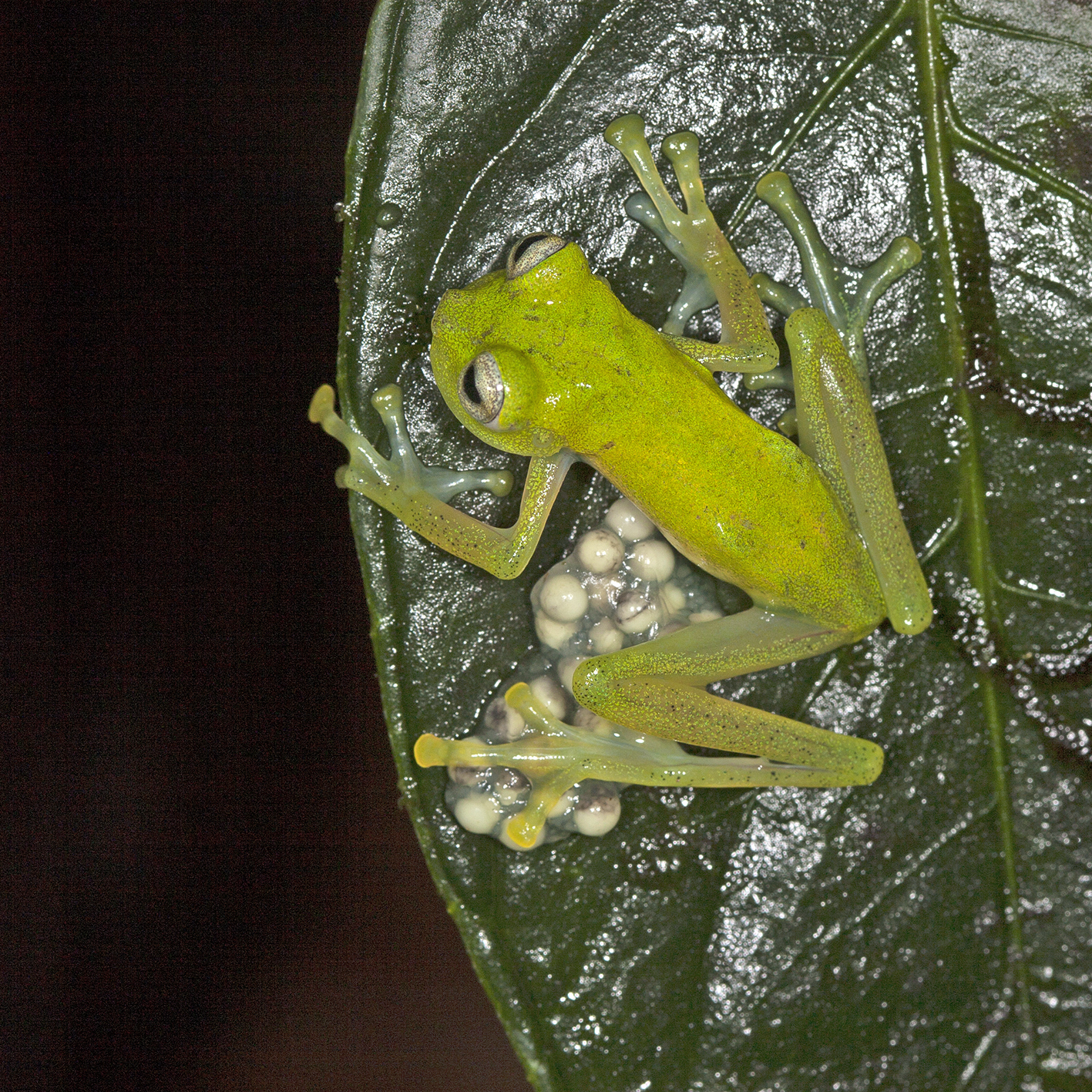
- Nymphargus griffithsi (pepper glassfrog)

Scientific classification
- Kingdom: Animalia
- Phylum: Chordata
- Class: Amphibia
- Order: Anura
- Family: Centrolenidae
- Subfamily: Centroleninae
- Genus: Nymphargus; Cisneros-Heredia & McDiarmid, 2007

Species
- 44, see text

= Nymphargus =

Genus of frog

Nymphargus is a genus of glass frogs in the subfamily Centroleninae. They are distributed in the Andean slopes of Colombia, Ecuador, Peru, and Bolivia.

== Description ==
They are characterized by lacking webbing among the outer fingers, lacking humeral spines in adult males, and having a lobed liver covered by a transparent hepatic peritoneum. They can be more specifically characterized as having a head that is darker green than the body, there being yellow spots surrounded by black on head and body, upper eyelids are dark lavender.

== Conservation ==
The conservation status of the Nymphargus frogs was largely believed to be critically endangered due to the minimal research done on this genus. Once the scope of the research was broadened the conservation status was able to be determined as being vulnerable. More frogs of different variations were found increasing the genus’ population.

== Species ==
Most species were moved to this genus from Cochranella. As of April 2026, this genus contains 44 species:

- Nymphargus anomalus (Lynch and Duellman, 1973)
- Nymphargus armatus (Lynch and Ruiz-Carranza, 1996)
- Nymphargus balionotus (Duellman, 1981)
- Nymphargus bejaranoi (Cannatella, 1980)
- Nymphargus buenaventura (Cisneros-Heredia and Yánez-Muñoz, 2007)
- Nymphargus cariticommatus (Wild, 1994)
- Nymphargus caucanus Rada, Ospina-Sarria, and Guayasamin, 2017
- Nymphargus chami (Ruiz-Carranza and Lynch, 1995)
- Nymphargus chancas (Duellman and Schulte, 1993)
- Nymphargus cochranae (Goin, 1961)
- Nymphargus colomai Guayasamin et Hutter, 2020
- Nymphargus cristinae (Ruiz-Carranza and Lynch, 1995)
- Nymphargus dajomesae Masache-Sarango, Cisneros-Heredia & Ron, 2026
- Nymphargus garciae (Ruiz-Carranza and Lynch, 1995)
- Nymphargus grandisonae (Cochran and Goin, 1970)
- Nymphargus griffithsi (Goin, 1961)
- Nymphargus humboldti Guayasamin, Cisneros-Heredia, McDiarmid et Hutter, 2020
- Nymphargus ignotus (Lynch, 1990)
- Nymphargus lasgralarias Hutter and Guayasamin, 2012
- Nymphargus laurae Cisneros-Heredia and McDiarmid, 2007
- Nymphargus lindae Guayasami, 2020
- Nymphargus luminosus (Ruiz-Carranza and Lynch, 1995)
- Nymphargus luteopunctatus (Ruiz-Carranza and Lynch, 1996)
- Nymphargus manduriacu Guayasamin, Cisneros-Heredia, Vieira, Kohn, Gavilanes, Lynch, Hamilton, and Maynard, 2019
- Nymphargus mariae (Duellman and Toft, 1979)
- Nymphargus megacheirus (Lynch and Duellman, 1973)
- Nymphargus megistus (Rivero, 1985)
- Nymphargus mixomaculatus (Guayasamin, Lehr, Rodríguez, and Aguilar, 2006)
- Nymphargus nephelophila (Ruiz-Carranza and Lynch, 1991)
- Nymphargus ocellatus (Boulenger, 1918)
- Nymphargus oreonympha (Ruiz-Carranza and Lynch, 1991)
- Nymphargus phenax (Cannatella and Duellman, 1982)
- Nymphargus pijao Montilla et al., 2023
- Nymphargus pluvialis (Cannatella and Duellman, 1982)
- Nymphargus posadae (Ruiz-Carranza and Lynch, 1995)
- Nymphargus prasinus (Duellman, 1981)
- Nymphargus rosada (Ruiz-Carranza and Lynch, 1997)
- Nymphargus ruizi (Lynch, 1993)
- Nymphargus siren (Lynch and Duellman, 1973)
- Nymphargus spilotus (Ruiz-Carranza and Lynch, 1997)
- Nymphargus sucre Guayasamin, 2013
- Nymphargus truebae (Duellman, 1976)
- Nymphargus vicenteruedai Velásquez-Álvarez, Rada, Sánchez-Pacheco, and Acosta-Galvis, 2007
- Nymphargus wileyi (Guayasamin, Bustamante, Almeida-Reinoso, and Funk, 2006)
