= Nymphargus spilotus =

Conservation status
- Near Threatened (IUCN 3.1)

Scientific classification
- Kingdom: Animalia
- Phylum: Chordata
- Class: Amphibia
- Order: Anura
- Family: Centrolenidae
- Genus: Nymphargus
- Species: N. spilotus

Binomial name
- Nymphargus spilotus (Ruíz-Carranza & Lynch, 1997)

Synonyms
- Cochranella spilota Ruíz-Carranza & Lynch, 1997

Species of frog

Nymphargus spilotus is a species of frog in the family Centrolenidae, formerly placed in Cochranella. It is endemic to Colombia where it occurs on the Cordillera Central in Samaná, the Caldas Department. Its natural habitat is sub-Andean forest where it occurs on vegetation alongside streams. Its conservation status is unclear.

Male Nymphargus spilotus grow to a snout–vent length of 25–26 mm (0.98–1.02 in). The dorsum is finely shagreen.
