= Nymphargus siren =

Conservation status
- Endangered (IUCN 3.1)

Scientific classification
- Kingdom: Animalia
- Phylum: Chordata
- Class: Amphibia
- Order: Anura
- Family: Centrolenidae
- Genus: Nymphargus
- Species: N. siren

Binomial name
- Nymphargus siren (Lynch & Duellman, 1973)

Synonyms
- Cochranella siren Lynch & Duellman, 1973

Species of frog

Nymphargus siren (common name: Rio Coca Cochran frog) is a species of frog in the family Centrolenidae, formerly placed in Cochranella. It is found in Colombia, Ecuador, and Peru. Its natural habitats are pre-montane forests near streams. It is threatened by habitat loss.

Adult males of Nymphargus siren measure 20–22 mm (0.79–0.87 in) in snout–vent length. Snout is truncate and dorsal skin is shagreen with spinules.
