= Ruiz's frog =

Ruiz's frog may refer to:

- Ruiz's Cochran frog (Nymphargus ruizi), a frog in the family Centrolenidae endemic to Colombia
- Ruiz's robber frog (Strabomantis ruizi), a frog in the family Craugastoridae endemic to Colombia
