= Nymphargus chami =

Conservation status
- Near Threatened (IUCN 3.1)

Scientific classification
- Kingdom: Animalia
- Phylum: Chordata
- Class: Amphibia
- Order: Anura
- Family: Centrolenidae
- Genus: Nymphargus
- Species: N. chami

Binomial name
- Nymphargus chami (Ruiz-Carranza and Lynch, 1995)

Synonyms
- Cochranella chami Ruíz-Carranza & Lynch, 1995

Species of frog

Nymphargus chami is a species of frog in the family Centrolenidae, formerly placed in Cochranella. It is endemic to Colombia where it occurs on the Cordillera Occidental in the Antioquia and Risaralda departments.

Its natural habitats are very humid tropical forests and cloud forests where it occurs on vegetation next to streams. Its conservation status is unclear but threats to it include timber extraction, cattle raising and agricultural development. It is directly threatened by the deforestation of the foothills in Paramillo National Park.

Male Nymphargus chami grow to a snout–vent length of 31–35 mm (1.2–1.4 in). The dorsum is shagreen with numerous subconical tubercles.
