= "Cochranella" xanthocheridia =

Conservation status
- Vulnerable (IUCN 3.1)

Scientific classification
- Kingdom: Animalia
- Phylum: Chordata
- Class: Amphibia
- Order: Anura
- Family: Centrolenidae
- Genus: "Cochranella"
- Species: "C." xanthocheridia

Binomial name
- "Cochranella" xanthocheridia Ruíz-Carranza & Lynch, 1995

Synonyms
- "Centrolene" xanthocheridia (Ruíz-Carranza & Lynch, 1995)

Species of frog

"Cochranella" xanthocheridia is a species of frog in the family Centrolenidae. It has an uncertain generic placement (incertae sedis) within subfamily Centroleninae; molecular data are not available and morphological and behavioural characters do not unambiguously place it in any specific genus.

Cochranella xanthocheridia is endemic to Colombia and known from the Cordillera Occidental in the Córdoba, Antioquia, and Risaralda Departments at elevations of 480–2,060 m (1,570–6,760 ft) asl.

The species' natural habitats are tropical rain forests of the Andean foothills and montane forests. It is threatened by habitat loss caused by agricultural expansion and timber extraction, and by water pollution.
