= Chimerella zoeterra =

Scientific classification
- Kingdom: Animalia
- Phylum: Chordata
- Class: Amphibia
- Order: Anura
- Family: Centrolenidae
- Genus: Chimerella
- Species: C. zoeterra

Binomial name
- Chimerella zoeterra Venegas, García Ayachi, Köhler, and Vences

Species of amphibian

Chimerella zoeterra is a species of frog in the family Centrolenidae. It is light green, with a white iris and green bones. The species is endemic to Peru, and was described in 2025.

== Taxonomy ==
Chimerella zoeterra was described in 2025, by Pablo Javier Venegas-Ibáñez, Luis Alberto García-Ayachi, Jörn Köhler, and Miguel Vences. The holotype is an adult male.

== Distribution ==
Chimerella zoeterra is endemic to Peru. It is found in the upper basins of the Chiriaco and Mayo rivers, at elevations of 1,770–1,982 metres (5,807–6,503 ft).

== Description ==
Adult males are 17.7–20.7 millimetres (0.70–0.81 in) long in snout-vent length, and adult females are 20.5–22.4 millimetres (0.81–0.88 in) in snout-vent length. The back is light yellow-green, with dark green and black flecks. The dorsal skin is finely grainy. The limbs are flecked with melanophores.

The vomer lacks teeth. The snout is dorsally and laterally truncated. The canthus is curved dorsally, and rounded in cross-section. The nostrils do not protrude. The tympanum is round and evident. The iris is white, with grey lines, and has an orange or greyish-red streak.

The pericardium, liver, gallbladder, visceral peritonea, and testes are covered with iridophores. The bones are green.

Adult males have a humeral spine. The nuptial pads are unpigmented. The call consists of three to five high-pitched notes.

Chimerella zoeterra is morphologically similar to Chimerella mariaelenae.

== Etymology ==
The specific epithet zoeterra is a noun in apposition. It honours ZoeTerra holdings, which sponsored the researchers who described the frog.
