= Nymphargus megacheirus =

Conservation status
- Critically Endangered (IUCN 3.1)

Scientific classification
- Kingdom: Animalia
- Phylum: Chordata
- Class: Amphibia
- Order: Anura
- Family: Centrolenidae
- Genus: Nymphargus
- Species: N. megacheirus

Binomial name
- Nymphargus megacheirus (Lynch & Duellman, 1973)

Synonyms
- Cochranella megacheira

Species of frog

Nymphargus megacheirus is a species of frog in the family Centrolenidae, formerly placed in Cochranella. It is found in Colombia and Ecuador. Its natural habitats are subtropical or tropical moist montane forests and rivers. It is threatened by habitat loss.
