= Nymphargus prasinus =

Conservation status
- Vulnerable (IUCN 3.1)

Scientific classification
- Kingdom: Animalia
- Phylum: Chordata
- Class: Amphibia
- Order: Anura
- Family: Centrolenidae
- Genus: Nymphargus
- Species: N. prasinus

Binomial name
- Nymphargus prasinus (Duellman, 1981)

Synonyms
- Cochranella prasina

Species of frog

Nymphargus prasinus is a species of frog in the family Centrolenidae, formerly placed in the genus Cochranella. It is endemic to Colombia. Its natural habitats are subtropical or tropical moist lowland forests, subtropical or tropical moist montane forests, and rivers. It is threatened by habitat loss.
