= Nymphargus luteopunctatus =

Conservation status
- Endangered (IUCN 3.1)

Scientific classification
- Kingdom: Animalia
- Phylum: Chordata
- Class: Amphibia
- Order: Anura
- Family: Centrolenidae
- Genus: Nymphargus
- Species: N. luteopunctatus

Binomial name
- Nymphargus luteopunctatus (Ruíz-Carranza & Lynch, 1996)

Synonyms
- Cochranella luteopunctata Ruíz-Carranza & Lynch, 1996

Species of frog

Nymphargus luteopunctatus is a species of frog in the family Centrolenidae, formerly placed in Cochranella. This frog has 2-3 large vomerine teeth and is green with yellow spots bordered by black. When viewed from above it has a rounded snout. It is endemic to the Cordillera Occidental in the Cauca Department, Colombia.

Its natural habitats are tropical moist montane forests and rivers.
