= Nymphargus cristinae =

Conservation status
- Endangered (IUCN 3.1)

Scientific classification
- Kingdom: Animalia
- Phylum: Chordata
- Class: Amphibia
- Order: Anura
- Family: Centrolenidae
- Genus: Nymphargus
- Species: N. cristinae

Binomial name
- Nymphargus cristinae (Ruíz-Carranza & Lynch, 1995)

Synonyms
- Cochranella cristinae Ruíz-Carranza & Lynch, 1995

Species of frog

Nymphargus cristinae is a species of frog in the family Centrolenidae, formerly placed in Cochranella. It is endemic to Colombia where it is only known near its type locality on the western slope of the Cordillera Occidental in Urrao, Antioquia. Its natural habitat is sub-Andean primary forest. It occurs on vegetation next to streams with canopy cover over the stream. Its conservation status is unclear but habitat degradation and loss caused by cattle raising, timber extraction, and cultivation of illegal crops are major threats.

Male Nymphargus cristinae grow to a snout–vent length of 26–31 mm (1.0–1.2 in). The dorsum is smooth to finally shagreen.
