= Nymphargus garciae =

Conservation status
- Vulnerable (IUCN 3.1)

Scientific classification
- Kingdom: Animalia
- Phylum: Chordata
- Class: Amphibia
- Order: Anura
- Family: Centrolenidae
- Genus: Nymphargus
- Species: N. garciae

Binomial name
- Nymphargus garciae (Ruíz-Carranza & Lynch, 1995)

Synonyms
- Cochranella garciae Ruíz-Carranza & Lynch, 1995

Species of frog

Nymphargus garciae is a species of frog in the family Centrolenidae, formerly placed in Cochranella. It is endemic to the eastern slopes of the Cordillera Central, Colombia. Its natural habitat is vegetation alongside streams in sub-Andean and Andean forests. It requires gallery forest for reproduction, and is therefore very sensitive to disturbance of this kind of habitat. It is threatened by habitat loss.

Nymphargus garciae lay the eggs on leaves overhanging water; when the tadpoles hatch they drop into the water below where they develop further. Adult males measure 25–28 mm (0.98–1.10 in) in snout–vent length. The snout is round and dorsal skin is finely shagreen with spiculated tubercles.
