= Nymphargus ignotus =

Conservation status
- Least Concern (IUCN 3.1)

Scientific classification
- Kingdom: Animalia
- Phylum: Chordata
- Class: Amphibia
- Order: Anura
- Family: Centrolenidae
- Genus: Nymphargus
- Species: N. ignotus

Binomial name
- Nymphargus ignotus (Lynch, 1990)

Synonyms
- Cochranella ignota

Species of amphibian

Nymphargus ignotus is a species of frog in the family Centrolenidae, formerly placed in Cochranella. It is endemic to Colombia. Its natural habitats are subtropical or tropical moist montane forests and rivers.
