= Rosada =

Rosada may refer to:

- Água Rosada or Álvaro XIV, ruler in Kongo from February 1891 to 1896
- Ariel Rosada (born 1978), Argentine midfielder
- Casa Rosada (the Pink House), the official seat of the executive branch of the government of Argentina
- Dada Rosada, mayor of Bandung City, West Java, Indonesia (2003–2008)
- Hombre de la esquina rosada, 1962 Argentine film
- Marcelo Rosada Silva (born 1976), former Brazilian football player
- Nymphargus rosada, species of frog in the family Centrolenidae, formerly placed in Cochranella
