= Nymphargus truebae =

Conservation status
- Critically Endangered (IUCN 3.1)

Scientific classification
- Kingdom: Animalia
- Phylum: Chordata
- Class: Amphibia
- Order: Anura
- Family: Centrolenidae
- Genus: Nymphargus
- Species: N. truebae

Binomial name
- Nymphargus truebae (Duellman, 1976)

Synonyms
- Cochranella truebae

Species of frog

Nymphargus truebae is a species of frog in the family Centrolenidae, formerly placed in Cochranella. It is endemic to Peru. Its natural habitats are subtropical or tropical moist montane forests and rivers.
