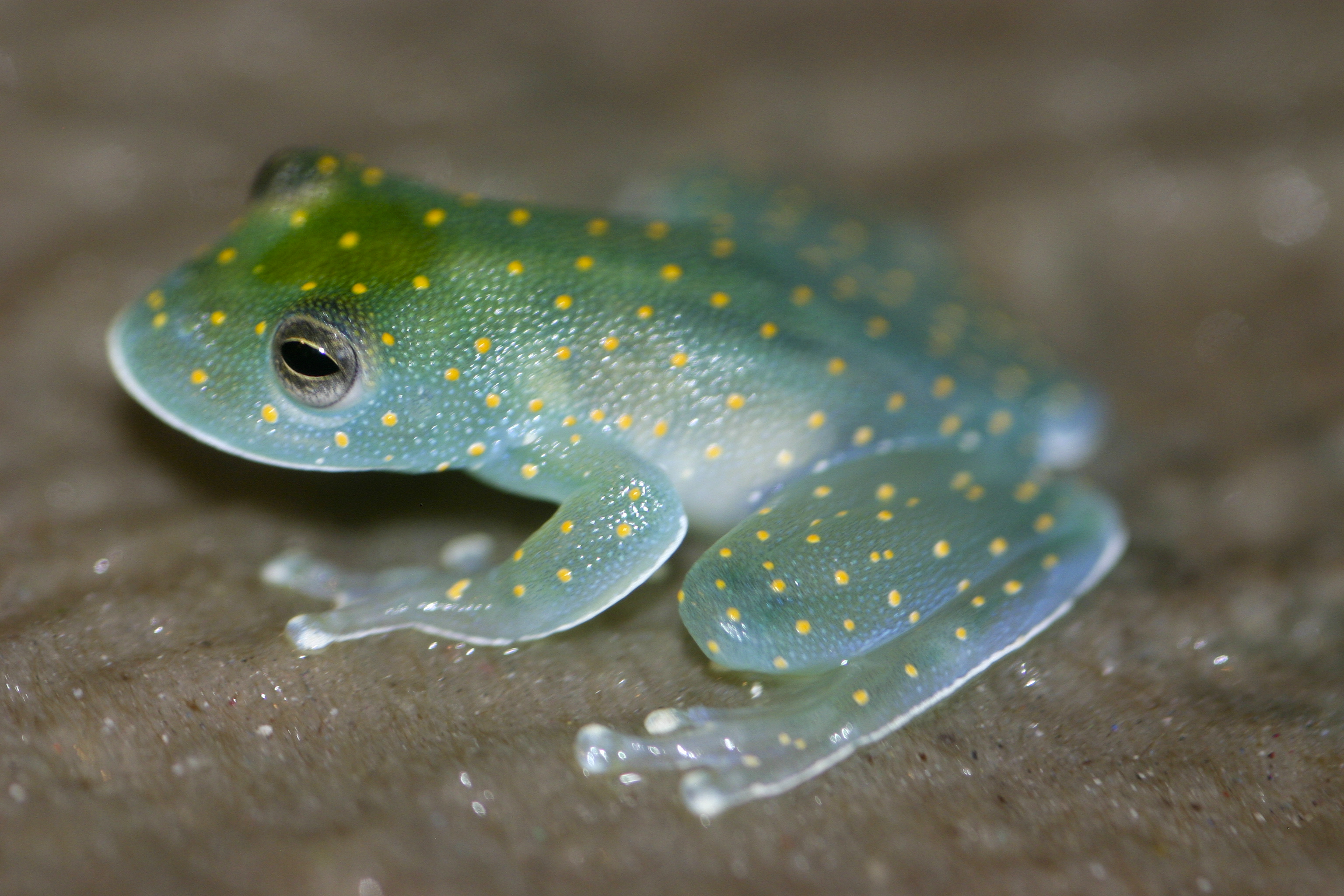

Conservation status
- Least Concern (IUCN 3.1)

Scientific classification
- Kingdom: Animalia
- Phylum: Chordata
- Class: Amphibia
- Order: Anura
- Family: Centrolenidae
- Genus: Cochranella
- Species: C. euknemos

Binomial name
- Cochranella euknemos (Savage and Starrett, 1967)

Synonyms
- Centrolenella euknemos Savage and Starrett, 1967

= Cochranella euknemos =

Species of frog

Cochranella euknemos, sometimes known as the San Jose Cochran frog, is a species of frog in the family Centrolenidae. It is found in central Costa Rica and south/eastward to Panama and to the western flank of the Cordillera Occidental in Colombia (Antioquia and Chocó Departments). Some Colombian records might apply to Cochranella mache.

== Description ==
Cochranella euknemos are small frogs, males growing to 25 mm (0.98 in) and females to 32 mm (1.3 in) in snout–vent length. They are dorsally blue-green and a little granular, with many small whitish or yellowish spots. Ventrally they are transparent white, but with more yellow on the undersides of the arms and legs. Iris is grayish ivory. Feet are moderately webbed.

== Reproduction ==
In Costa Rica, males call in May–November. Egg masses are gelatinous and laid on the tips of leaves overhanging streams.

== Habitat and conservation ==
The species' natural habitats are humid lowland, premontane, and montane forests. It occurs in bushes and trees along forest-covered streams. Its altitudinal range is 100–1,940 m (330–6,360 ft) asl in Colombia, somewhat narrower elsewhere.

Cochranella euknemos is generally threatened by deforestation in Panama, and east of the Panama Canal, chytridiomycosis. In Costa Rica it has declined and has not been seen since 1986, despite dedicated survey efforts, but the reasons for this decline are not currently known.
