= Urrao Cochran frog =

Conservation status
- Endangered (IUCN 3.1)

Scientific classification
- Kingdom: Animalia
- Phylum: Chordata
- Class: Amphibia
- Order: Anura
- Family: Centrolenidae
- Genus: Nymphargus
- Species: N. megistus

Binomial name
- Nymphargus megistus (Rivero, 1985)

Synonyms
- Centrolenella megista Rivero, 1985; "Cochranella" megistra (Rivero, 1985)

Species of amphibian

The Urrao Cochran frog (Nymphargus megistus) is a species of frog in the family Centrolenidae. It is endemic to Colombia. Its natural habitats are subtropical or tropical moist montane forests and rivers.
