= Chimerella =

- Chimerella mariaelenae

Scientific classification
- Kingdom: Animalia
- Phylum: Chordata
- Class: Amphibia
- Order: Anura
- Family: Centrolenidae
- Subfamily: Centroleninae
- Genus: Chimerella; Guayasamin, Castroviejo-Fisher, Trueb, Ayarzagüena, Rada, and Vilà, 2009

Type species
- Centrolene mariaelenae Cisneros-Heredia and McDiarmid, 2006

Genus of amphibians

Chimerella is a small genus of glass frogs, family Centrolenidae. They are found on the Amazonian slopes of the Andes in Ecuador and Peru, possibly extending into Colombia.

== Species ==
There are four species:

- Chimerella corleone Twomey, Delia, and Castroviejo-Fisher, 2014
- Chimerella mariaelenae Cisneros-Heredia and McDiarmid, 2006
- Chimerella mira Köhler, Venegas, Castillo-Urbina, Glaw, Aguilar-Puntriano & Vences, 2023
- Chimerella zoeterra Venegas, Garcia-Ayachi, Kohler and Vences 2025
