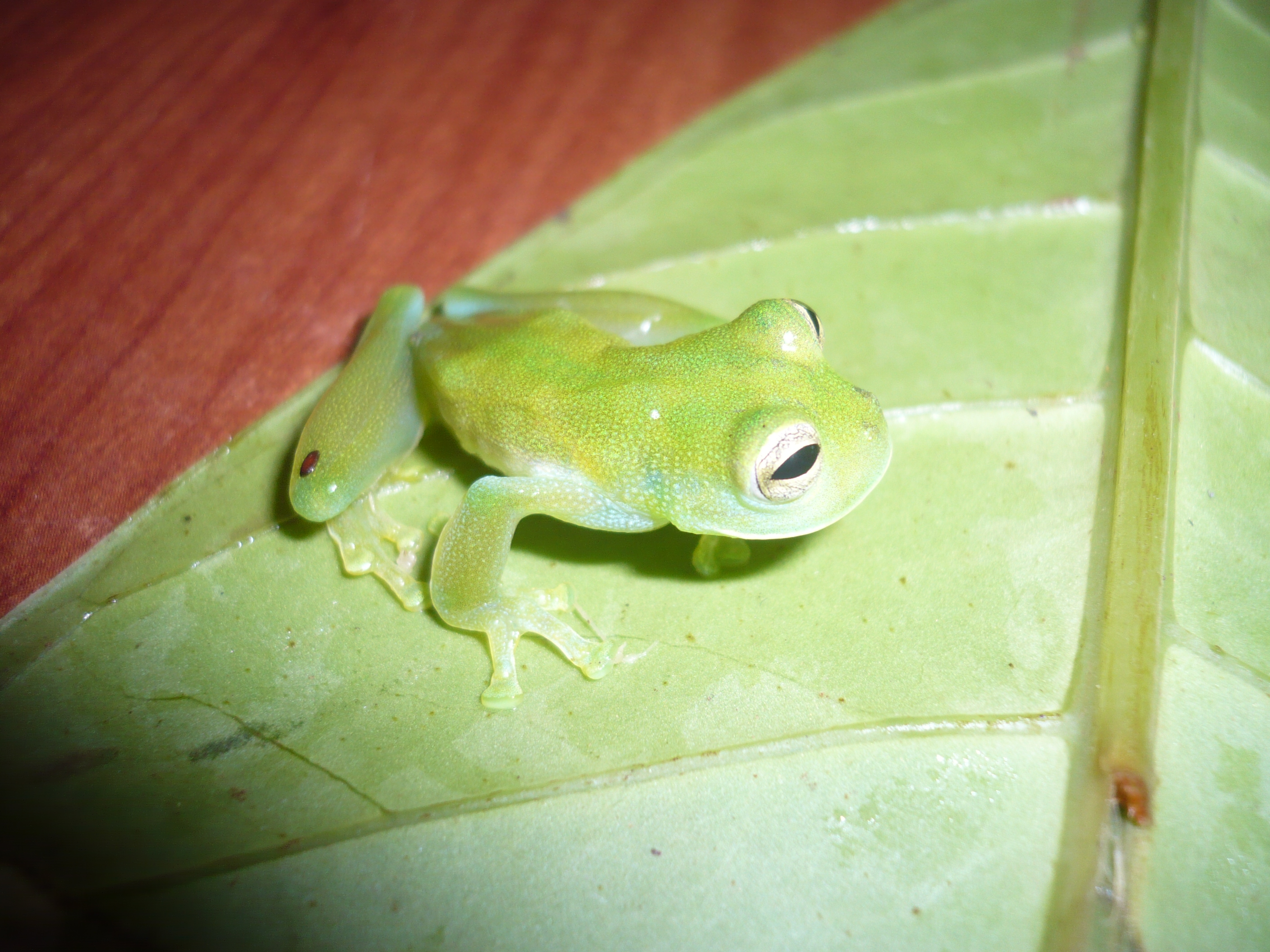
- Dorsal perspective
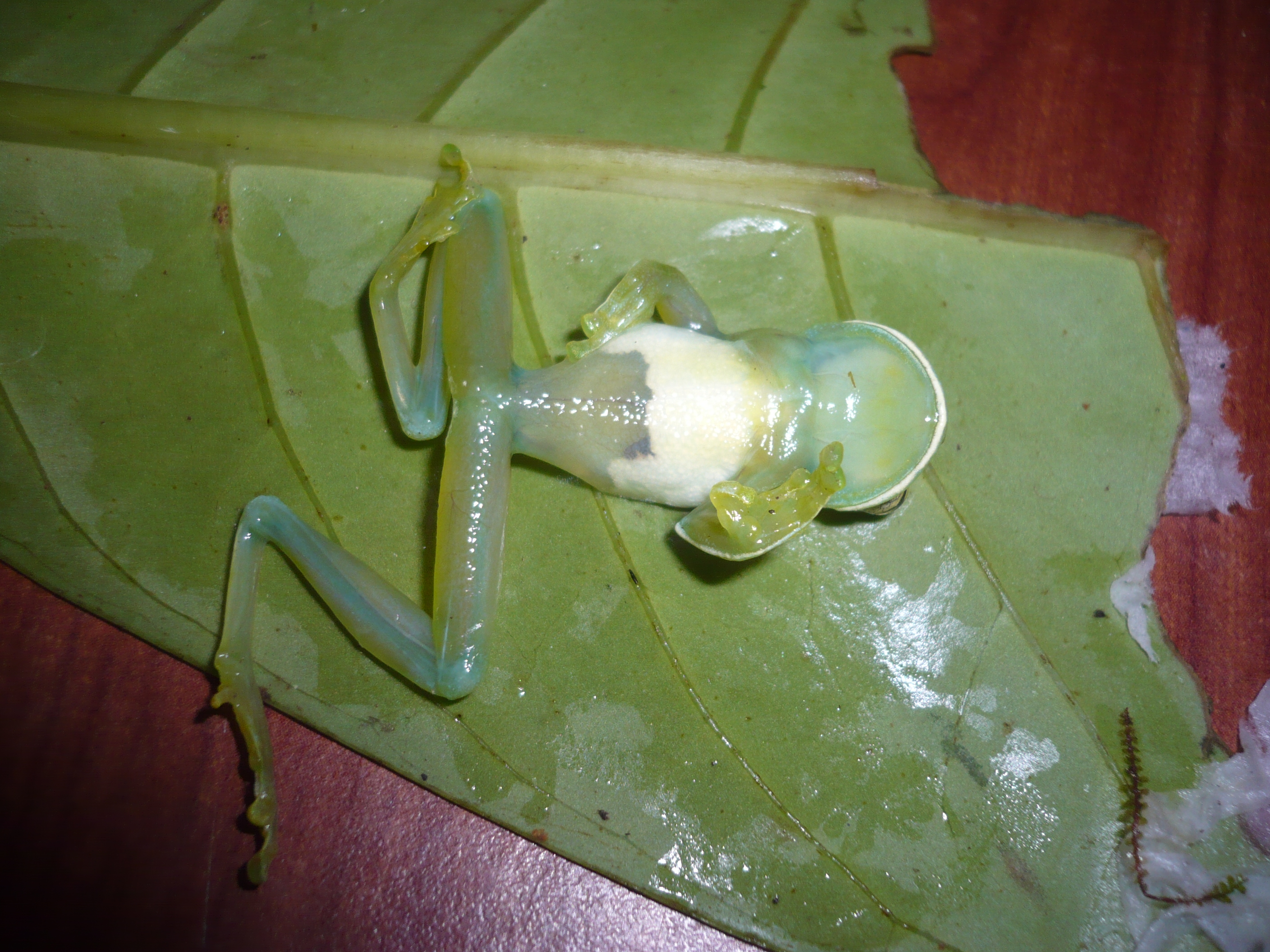
- Ventral perspective

Conservation status
- Least Concern (IUCN 3.1)

Scientific classification
- Kingdom: Animalia
- Phylum: Chordata
- Class: Amphibia
- Order: Anura
- Family: Centrolenidae
- Genus: Cochranella
- Species: C. nola

Binomial name
- Cochranella nola Harvey, 1996

= Cochranella nola =

Species of frog

Cochranella nola is a species of frog in the family Centrolenidae, the glass frogs, so named because of the transparent skin on the underside of the abdomen through which the internal organs can be seen. This species is endemic to Bolivia where it is found in the Andean foothills in the Santa Cruz Department. Its natural habitats are subtropical or tropical moist montane forests and rivers. The scientific name nola is Latin for "small bell", and refers to the high-pitched, bell-like call of the male in the breeding season.

== Description ==
Cochranella nola is a small arboreal species of glass frog. Males are about 21 mm (0.8 in) long while females are a little larger at 25 mm (1.0 in). This frog has a truncated snout and vomerine teeth, widely-separated eyes and small, indistinct tympani. The dorsal surface and flanks are finely granulated while the hands and feet are smooth. The limbs are slender, the digits having adhesive toepads; there is extensive webbing between fingers III and IV, and between the toes. The dorsal surface and flanks of this frog are a uniform green with fine white speckling; the ventral surface is white, the hind part being transparent, enabling the yellow intestines to be seen. The upper lip is white, the tongue is green and the iris is white, with dark reticulations, and a horizontal pupil. The bones are dark green.

== Distribution and habitat ==
Cochranella nola was first described in 1996 from the Santa Cruz Department in Bolivia, where it occurred near water courses in dry, semi-deciduous montane forests, damper montane forests and lowland rainforests, at altitudes between about 500 and 1,750 m (1,600 and 5,700 ft). The type locality is Quebrada EI Fuerte, a tributary of teh Río Piray near Samaipata (Santa Cruz, Bolivia), where the species inhabits a shallow (<1 m) fast-flowing stream with a rocky-gravel bed and sections exposed to direct sun; calling males were observed on vegetation ~ 2 m above the water, giving a single sharp "pink" about every 30 seconds. In 2013, the first record of its presence in Peru was recorded, it having been found in Bahuaja-Sonene National Park in the southeast of the country. Later surveys documented the species in southeastern Peru (Cusco, Madre de Dios, and Puno departments), with nocturnal calling (~19:00-22:00 h) along streamside vegetation, extending the known range northwest from Bolivia.

== Ecology ==
In the breeding season, males call from near fast-flowing streams, either from rocks in the streambed, or from foliage up to a few meters above the water. Up to six males may call in chorus, spaced out a few centimetres apart. The calls are either single high-pitched "pinks" at irregular intervals, or groups of three "pinks" in quick succession. Females lay clutches of eggs on wet boulders.

== Status ==
In its limited range in Bolivia, this species is common, but it is threatened by pollution of the streams where it breeds which can suffer from agricultural run-off, and the International Union for Conservation of Nature has rated it as "near-threatened". Now that it has been recorded from a further location in Peru, this frog's conservation status may need to be reassessed.
