= Nymphargus oreonympha =

Conservation status
- Least Concern (IUCN 3.1)

Scientific classification
- Kingdom: Animalia
- Phylum: Chordata
- Class: Amphibia
- Order: Anura
- Family: Centrolenidae
- Genus: Nymphargus
- Species: N. oreonympha

Binomial name
- Nymphargus oreonympha (Ruiz-Carranza and Lynch, 1991)

Synonyms
- Cochranella oreonympha Ruíz-Carranza & Lynch, 1991

Species of amphibian

Nymphargus oreonympha (common name: Caqueta Cochran frog) is a species of frog in the family Centrolenidae, formerly placed in Cochranella. It is endemic to Colombia where it occurs on the Cordillera Oriental in Florencia, the Caquetá Department. Its natural habitat is cloud forest, including secondary forest, where it occurs on vegetation near streams. Its conservation status is unclear.

Male Nymphargus oreonympha grow to a snout–vent length of 24–26 mm (0.94–1.02 in). The dorsum has numerous small tubercles.
