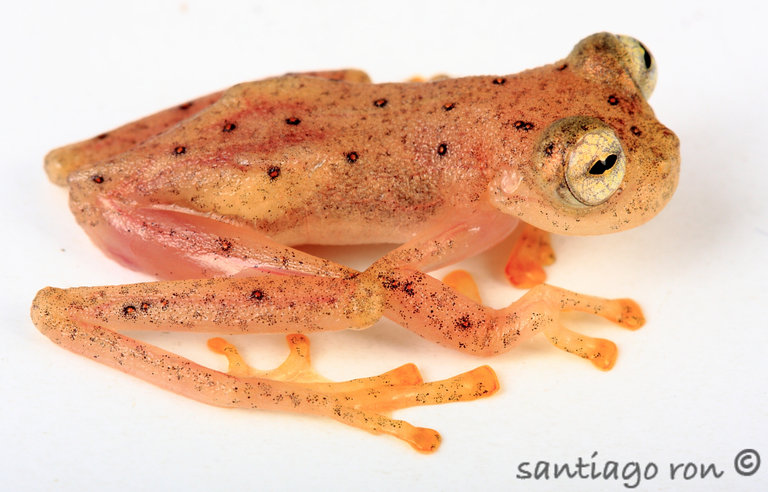

Conservation status
- Endangered (IUCN 3.1)

Scientific classification
- Kingdom: Animalia
- Phylum: Chordata
- Class: Amphibia
- Order: Anura
- Family: Centrolenidae
- Genus: Nymphargus
- Species: N. anomalus

Binomial name
- Nymphargus anomalus (Lynch and Duellman, 1973)

Synonyms
- Centrolenella anomala Lynch and Duellman, 1973; Cochranella anomala (Lynch and Duellman, 1973)

= Nymphargus anomalus =

Species of frog

Nymphargus anomalus is a species of frog in the family Centrolenidae. It is endemic to Ecuador and occurs on the Amazonian slopes of the Ecuadorian Andes in the Napo Province. Common name Napo Cochran frog has been coined for it.

== Description ==
Adult males measure 21–25 mm (0.8–1.0 in) and adult females 26–27 mm (1.0–1.1 in) in snoot–vent length. The snout is short and truncate. The tympanum is visible, with its upper edge barely covered by the weakly-developed supra-tympanic fold. The fingers are only slightly webbed and have broad discs. The toes are two-thirds webbed and have discs that are rounder and slightly smaller than those on the fingers. The coloration is tan, which is unusual among the related species—hence the specific name anomala, from Greek "unusual". There are small, black ocelli that enclose orange-tan spots.

== Habitat and conservation ==
Nymphargus anomalus occurs in vegetation bordering mountain streams at elevations of 1,668–1,771 m (5,472–5,810 ft) above sea level. It is nocturnal. Males call from the vegetation. Females attach their eggs on mossy branches over the stream. The male holotype was found on a mossy limb of a bush, about 1.5 m (5 ft) above a cascading rivulet.

The habitat at the type locality has been subject to some habitat loss. For a long time, this was the only known locality. However, in 2009 one new population was found near the Llanganates National Park, and another from the Sumaco volcano (not specified whether the locality was within the Sumaco Napo-Galeras National Park).
