= Nymphargus armatus =

Conservation status
- Critically Endangered (IUCN 3.1)

Scientific classification
- Kingdom: Animalia
- Phylum: Chordata
- Class: Amphibia
- Order: Anura
- Family: Centrolenidae
- Genus: Nymphargus
- Species: N. armatus

Binomial name
- Nymphargus armatus (Lynch and Ruíz-Carranza, 1996)

Synonyms
- Cochranella armata Lynch and Ruiz-Carranza, 1996

Species of frog

Nymphargus armatus is a species of frog in the family Centrolenidae. It is endemic to Colombia and only known from the immediate vicinity of its type locality in El Cairo municipality, Valle del Cauca Department. In much of the literature it is known as Cochranella armata as it was moved to its present genus only in 2007.

== Description ==
Nymphargus armatus are relatively small frogs; males measure 23–25 mm (0.91–0.98 in) in snout–vent length and females 24–25 mm (0.94–0.98 in). Male Nymphargus armatus have patches of cornified nuptial spines on the thumb — hence the specific name, armatus, which means "armed". Male frogs call from tops of leaves and vegetation with "a soft exhaled whistle". Egg masses are found on the tops of leaves.

== Habitat and conservation ==
Nymphargus armatus is known from vegetation next to an open stream in primary forest in Cordillera Occidental of Columbia.

While no threats to this species are identified, Nymphargus armatus is classified as "Critically Endangered" because it is known from only a single location.
