= Cochranella litoralis =

Conservation status
- Vulnerable (IUCN 3.1)

Scientific classification
- Kingdom: Animalia
- Phylum: Chordata
- Class: Amphibia
- Order: Anura
- Family: Centrolenidae
- Genus: Cochranella
- Species: C. litoralis

Binomial name
- Cochranella litoralis Ruiz-Carranza and Lynch, 1996

Synonyms
- Centrolene litoralis Ruiz-Carranza and Lynch, 1996; Centrolene litorale –correction in gender

Species of frog

Cochranella litoralis is a species of frog in the family Centrolenidae. It is known from the Pacific lowlands of southwestern Colombia (Cauca and Nariño Departments) and northern Ecuador (Esmeraldas Province). The specific name litoralis refers to the proximity of the type locality to the sea.

== Description ==
Adult males measure 19–20 mm (0.7–0.8 in) in snout–vent length; female size is unknown. The snout is truncated. The tympanum is visible and only slightly obscured by the supra-tympanic fold posterodorsally. The fingers have absent to moderate webbing (from inner to outer fingers). The toes are moderately webbed. The dorsum is yellowish green and has dark gray spots. The ventral parietal peritoneum is white. Adult males have a visible small humeral spine. The pre-pollical spine is clearly separated from the first finger. The iris is gray and has no evident dark reticulation.

== Habitat and conservation ==
Centrolene litorale occurs in tropical lowland rainforests at elevations of 100–200 m (330–660 ft) above sea level. Reproduction is unknown but presumably takes place in streams. The Ecuadorian populations are threatened by logging.
