= Nymphargus balionotus =

Conservation status
- Vulnerable (IUCN 3.1)

Scientific classification
- Kingdom: Animalia
- Phylum: Chordata
- Class: Amphibia
- Order: Anura
- Family: Centrolenidae
- Genus: Nymphargus
- Species: N. balionotus

Binomial name
- Nymphargus balionotus (Duellman, 1981)

Synonyms
- Centrolenella balionota Duellman, 1981; Centrolene balionotum (Duellman, 1981); "Cochranella" balionota (Duellman, 1981)

Species of frog

Nymphargus balionotus is a species of frog in the family Centrolenidae. It is found in the Andes of Colombia (Cordillera Occidental: Cauca and Valle del Cauca Departments) and Ecuador (Carchi and Pichincha Provinces). Common names Mindo Cochran frog and mottled glassfrog has been coined for it.

== Description ==
Adult males measure 20–23 mm (0.8–0.9 in) in snout–vent length. The head is much wider than the body and the snout is truncate. The fingers have later fringes and some webbing between the outer fingers whereas the toes are about three-fourths webbed. The fingers have discs that are slightly larger than toe discs. The dorsum is pale green and has reddish brown stripes and flecks and elevated yellow spots.

== Habitat and conservation ==
Nymphargus balionotus lives on vegetation along streams in humid lowland tropical forests and cloud forests at elevations of 400–1,540 m (1,310–5,050 ft) above sea level. It is an arboreal species. The eggs are laid on leaves overhanging streams.

This species is reasonably common in Colombia. No recent records exist from Ecuador, although it was abundant there at the type locality in 1975. It is threatened by habitat loss (deforestation) caused by agriculture, logging, and human settlements.
