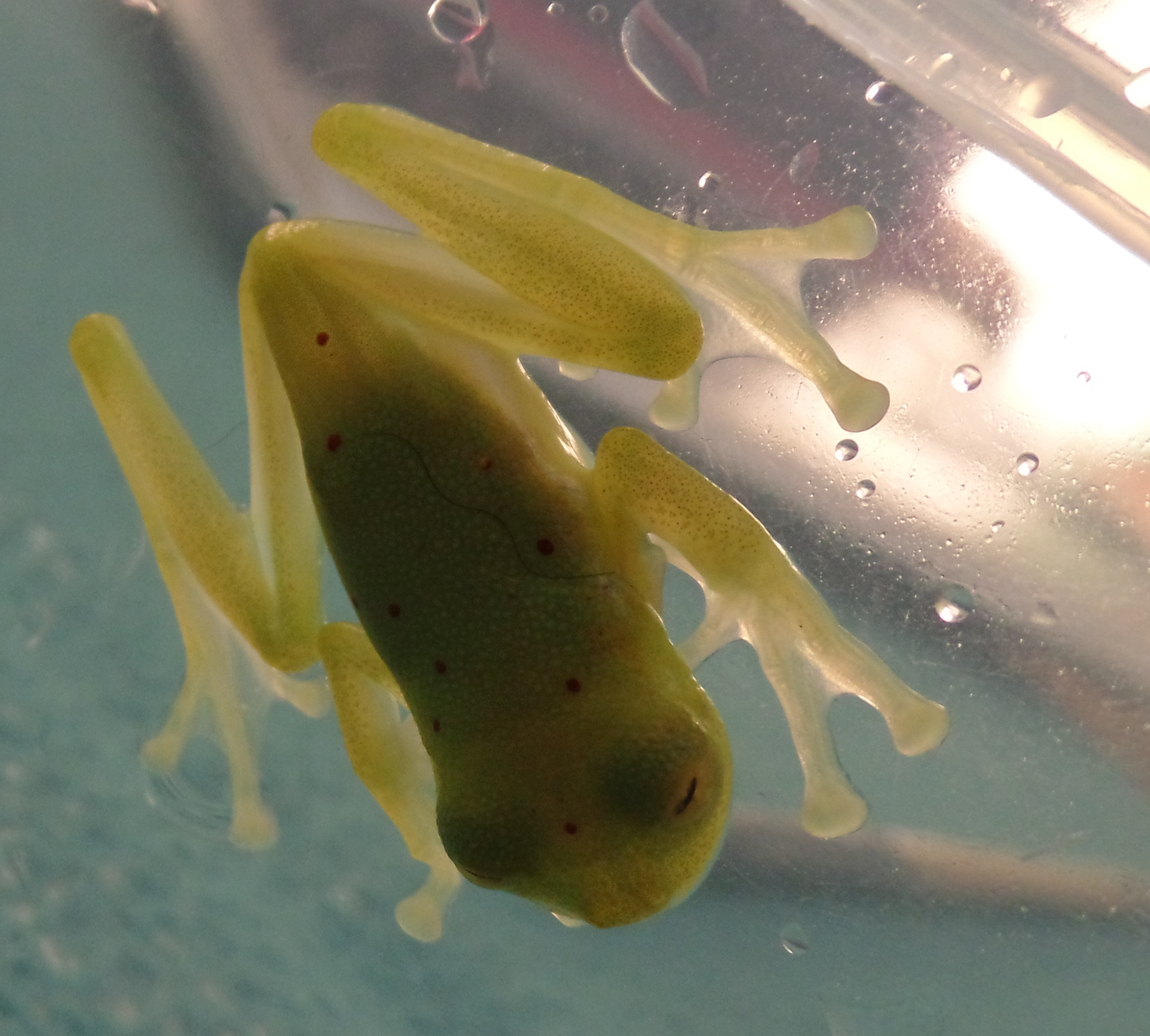

Conservation status
- Least Concern (IUCN 3.1)

Scientific classification
- Kingdom: Animalia
- Phylum: Chordata
- Class: Amphibia
- Order: Anura
- Family: Centrolenidae
- Genus: Nymphargus
- Species: N. grandisonae

Binomial name
- Nymphargus grandisonae (Cochran & Goin, 1970)

Synonyms
- Centrolenella grandisonae Cochran & Goin, 1970; Centrolene grandisonae Ruiz-Carranza & Lynch, 1991; Nymphargus grandisonae Guayasamin et al., 2009

= Nymphargus grandisonae =

Species of frog

Nymphargus grandisonae (common names: giant glass frog, red-spotted glassfrog) is a species of frog in the family Centrolenidae. It is found in Andes of Colombia and Ecuador. Its natural habitat is tropical moist montane forest (cloud forest); larvae develop in streams and still-water pools. Its habitat is threatened by habitat loss, introduced fish, and agricultural pollution, but it is still a common species not considered threatened by the IUCN.

== Description ==
Adult males of this species are about 27 mm (1.1 in) long and adult females are about 30 mm (1.2 in). The large, bulbous eyes have yellow irises. The body and limbs are slender, and there are large adhesive discs on the tips of the fingers and toes. The male has a hooked spur on the upper arm which is used when fighting rivals. The upper parts of head and body are green with many small red circular spots. The underparts are whitish or creamy yellow.

== Distribution and habitat ==
This frog is endemic to Colombia and Ecuador, being found on the western slopes of the Western Cordilleras and the Central Cordilleras in Colombia, and in the Ecuadorean provinces of Carchi, Cotopaxi, Pichincha and Santo Domingo de los Tsáchilas. Its altitudinal range is between 1,140 and 2,010 m (3,700 and 6,600 ft). It is to be found in foliage in swamps and near streams, in cloud forest, by forest edges, in pastures and by roadsides, but never far from forests.

== Ecology ==
This species is nocturnal and breeds in streams and pools. Males congregate in vegetation a few metres above a water body and call to attract the females. They continue to call for a few days, or up to three months, from their favoured locations (average 36 days). They engage in fights with rival males, dangling from twigs and leaves with their hind limbs while using the spurs on their forelimbs to engage. They are sometimes injured during these battles.

A pair of frogs was observed in amplexus on the upper surface of a large leaf for several hours, and watched using red light, so as not to disturb them. They moved around the leaf, moved to a few more leaves and then returned to their starting leaf. Here the female positioned herself with the tip of her abdomen near the edge of the leaf and started laying eggs, edging her way forward while doing so. The male made various leg movements which may have facilitated spreading his sperm over the eggs. When the clutch was completed, the male detached and moved to another leaf, where he called 13 times. Meanwhile, the female moved back slowly and covered the eggs with her body for 25 minutes. There were 61 eggs in the clutch, and they were positioned in such a way that when the tadpoles hatched, they would fall into the water below.

== Status ==
This frog has a somewhat restricted range extending to about 20,000 km^{2} (7,700 mi^{2}) or less. The main threats it faces include deforestation, logging, the introduction of predatory fish into the streams where it lives and pollution resulting from agricultural activities. However, it is an abundant and adaptable species, and the International Union for Conservation of Nature has rated its conservation status as being of "least concern", as any decrease in population sizes is likely to be at too slow a rate to be sufficient to classify it in a more threatened category.
