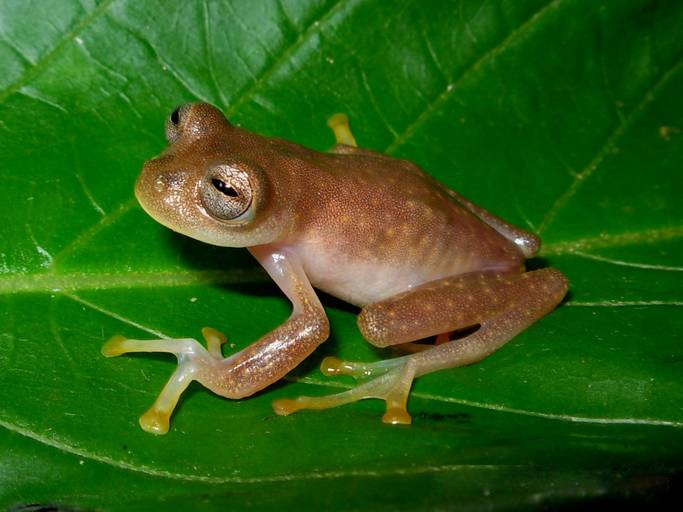

Conservation status
- Vulnerable (IUCN 3.1)

Scientific classification
- Kingdom: Animalia
- Phylum: Chordata
- Class: Amphibia
- Order: Anura
- Family: Centrolenidae
- Genus: Nymphargus
- Species: N. rosada

Binomial name
- Nymphargus rosada (Ruíz-Carranza & Lynch, 1997)

Synonyms
- Cochranella rosada Ruíz-Carranza & Lynch, 1997

= Nymphargus rosada =

Species of frog

Nymphargus rosada is a species of frog in the family Centrolenidae, formerly placed in Cochranella. It is endemic to Colombia where it is known from the eastern slopes of the Cordillera Central. Its natural habitats are sub-Andean forests alongside streams. It is threatened by habitat fragmentation and loss caused by agricultural expansion, timber extraction, and water pollution.

Nymphargus rosada are relatively small frogs: adult males measure 24–28 mm (0.94–1.10 in) in snout–vent length. The skin of the dorsum is finely shagreen with small pustules. Vomerine teeth are absent.

The frog's range includes at least one protected park, including the Ranita Dorada Amphibian Reserve.
