= Nymphargus mariae =

Conservation status
- Least Concern (IUCN 3.1)

Scientific classification
- Kingdom: Animalia
- Phylum: Chordata
- Class: Amphibia
- Order: Anura
- Family: Centrolenidae
- Genus: Nymphargus
- Species: N. mariae

Binomial name
- Nymphargus mariae (Duellman & Toft, 1979)

Synonyms
- Centrolene mariae (Duellman & Toft, 1979); Centronella puyoensis Flores and McDiarmid, 1989; Centrolene puyoense (Flores and McDiarmid, 1989); Cochranella puyoensis (Flores and McDiarmid, 1989); Nymphargus puyoensis (Flores and McDiarmid, 1989)

Species of frog

Nymphargus mariae, commonly known as Maria's giant glass frog, is a species of frog in the family Centrolenidae. It is found in the cloud forests of the Serranía de Sira, Huánuco, Peru and in Ecuador. A population endemic to Ecuador was previously considered to be a distinct species, Nymphargus puyoensis, but is now classified as a junior synonym.

Its natural habitats are the cloud forests of the Serranía de Sira and lower montane wet forests of Ecuador. The larvae develop in streams. There is some habitat loss occurring within the already limited range (<5,000 km^{2}) of this species.
