= Nymphargus ocellatus =

Conservation status
- Data Deficient (IUCN 3.1)

Scientific classification
- Kingdom: Animalia
- Phylum: Chordata
- Class: Amphibia
- Order: Anura
- Family: Centrolenidae
- Genus: Nymphargus
- Species: N. ocellatus

Binomial name
- Nymphargus ocellatus (Boulenger, 1918)

Synonyms
- Cochranella ocellata Boulenger, 1918

Species of amphibian

Nymphargus ocellatus (common name: spotted Cochran frog) is a species of frog in the family Centrolenidae. It is endemic to the Amazonian slopes of Andes in Peru. Its natural habitats are tropical moist montane forests (cloud forests); larvae develop in streams. It is threatened by habitat loss.
