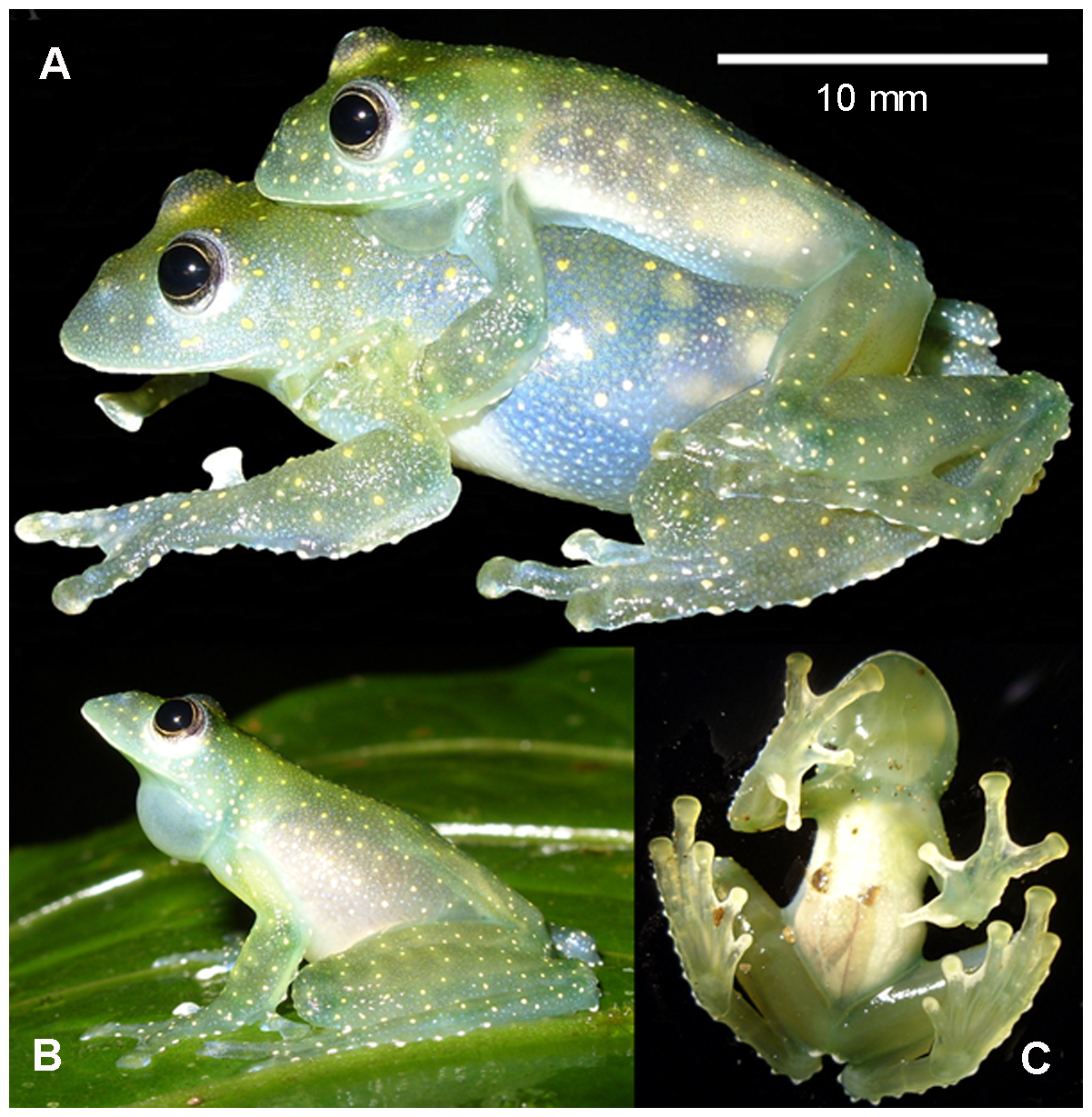
- Top: An amplectant pair. Bottom: A calling male.

Conservation status
- Near Threatened (IUCN 3.1)

Scientific classification
- Kingdom: Animalia
- Phylum: Chordata
- Class: Amphibia
- Order: Anura
- Family: Centrolenidae
- Genus: Cochranella
- Species: C. mache

Binomial name
- Cochranella mache Guayasamin and Bonaccorso, 2004

= Cochranella mache =

Species of amphibian

Cochranella mache, also known as the Mache glassfrog or Mache Cochran frog, is a species of frogs in the family Centrolenidae. It is found in the lowland forest and eastern slopes of Cordillera Mache–Chindul in the Esmeraldas Province, northwestern Ecuador, and in the western foothills of the Cordillera Occidental in Colombia (Antioquia, Chocó, and Valle del Cauca Departments).

== Description ==
Adult males measure 22–26 mm (0.87–1.02 in) and females 26–33 mm (1.0–1.3 in) in snout–vent length. The dorsum is green with numerous, small yellow dots. The upper lip has a narrow white line. The ventral surfaces of the extremities as well as the gular region are greenish blue. The iris is white and has fine black reticulations and a golden ring around the pupil.

== Reproduction ==
The males call in vegetation overhanging rivulets, typically in the midstory vegetation some 2–10 m (6 ft 7 in – 32 ft 10 in) above ground. The call consists of two pulses lasting about 0.04 seconds and about 0.01 second apart, and with the dominant frequency of 5410 Hz. The amplexus is axillar. Fecundity of a 33 mm long female is about 30 eggs.

== Habitat and conservation ==
Its natural habitats are seasonal evergreen foothill forests and sub-Andean forests at elevations of 43–1,030 m (141–3,379 ft) above sea level. The Ecuadorian population is under significant pressure from logging. Currently, their habitat has decreased due to agricultural frontier, non-native plantations, and deforestation. These risks increase the endangeredness of these species due to restricted geographical range, which decreases further knowledge on these already rare species.

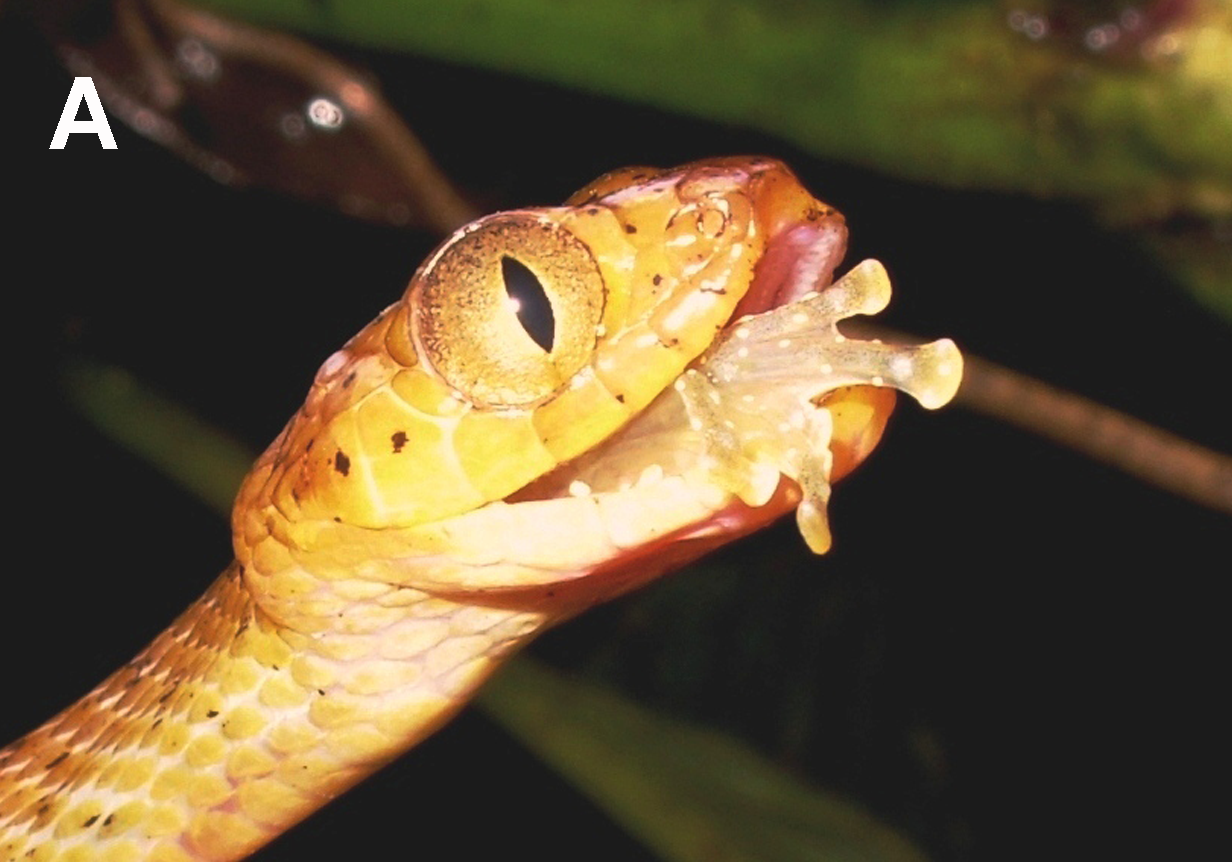
Leptodeira septentrionalis eating Cochranella mache.

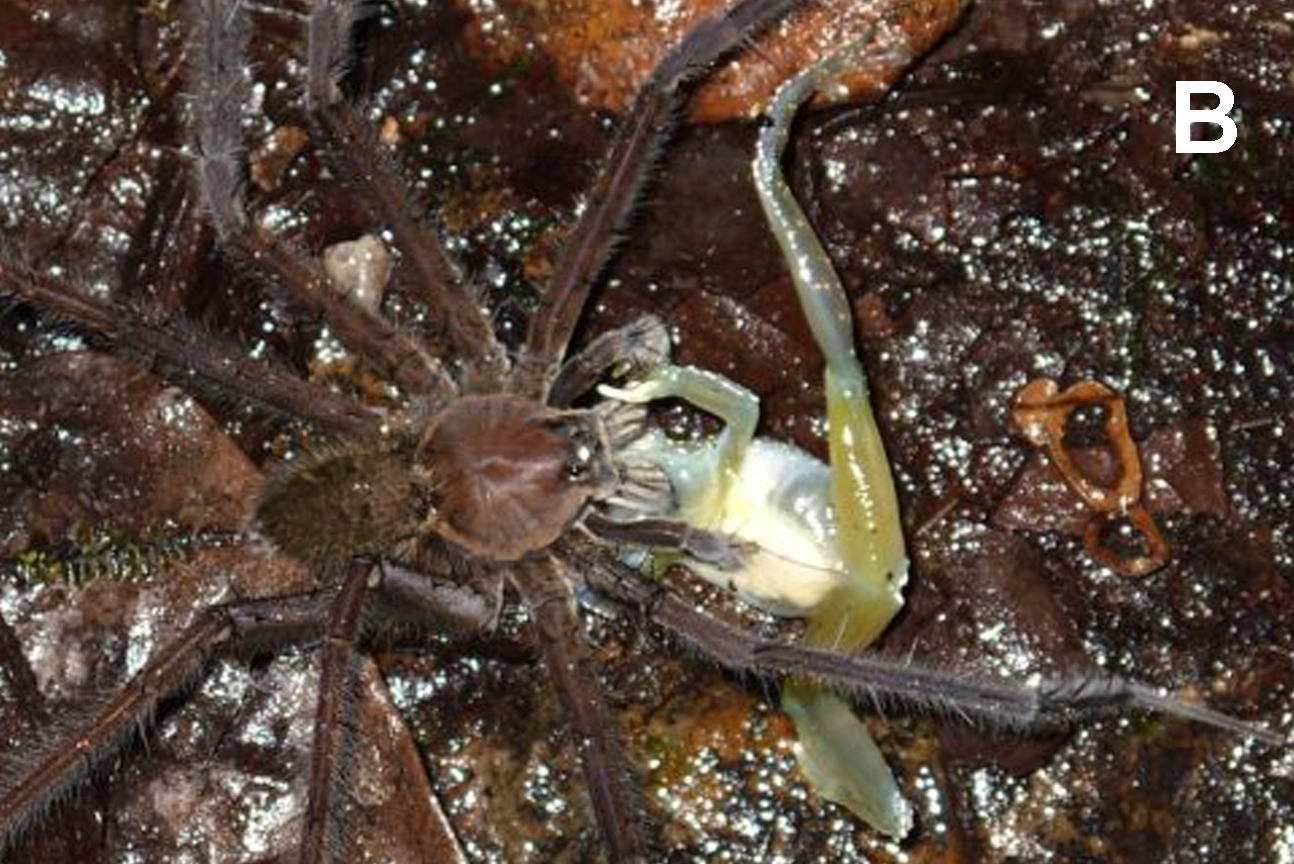
Spider Ctenus sp. eating Cochranella mache.
