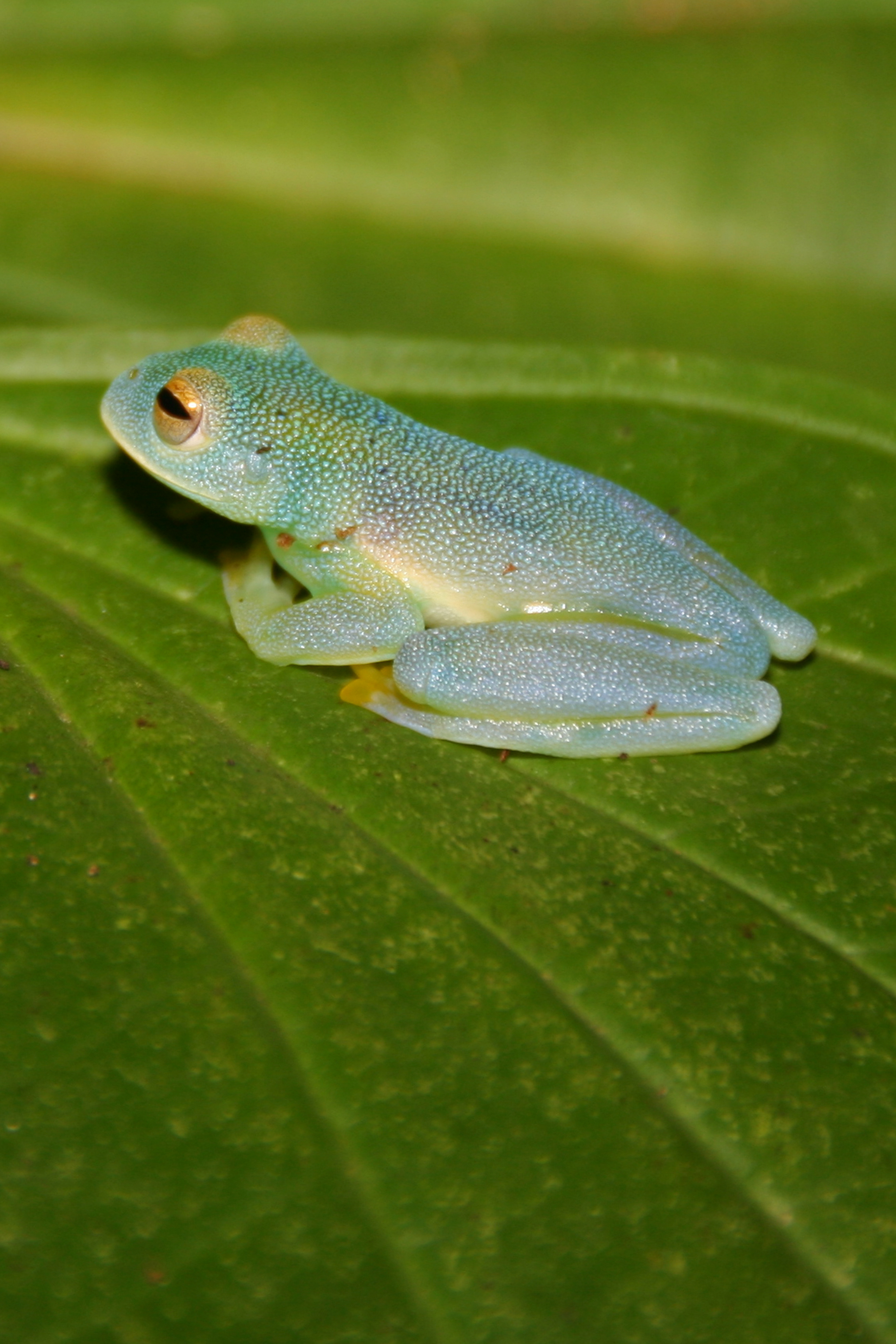

Conservation status
- Least Concern (IUCN 3.1)

Scientific classification
- Kingdom: Animalia
- Phylum: Chordata
- Class: Amphibia
- Order: Anura
- Family: Centrolenidae
- Genus: Cochranella
- Species: C. granulosa

Binomial name
- Cochranella granulosa (Taylor, 1949)

Synonyms
- Centrolenella granulosa Taylor, 1949

= Cochranella granulosa =

Species of amphibian

Cochranella granulosa (common name: grainy Cochran frog, Spanish: ranita de cristal) is a species of frog in the family Centrolenidae. It is found in Costa Rica, Honduras, Nicaragua, and Panama.

Cochranella granulosa is a nocturnal, arboreal frog found in humid lowland and montane forests. It is typically found in vegetation near streams. Eggs are deposited on vegetation over streams, and the tadpoles drop to water upon hatching. This species is negatively impacted by habitat loss (deforestation) and water pollution.
