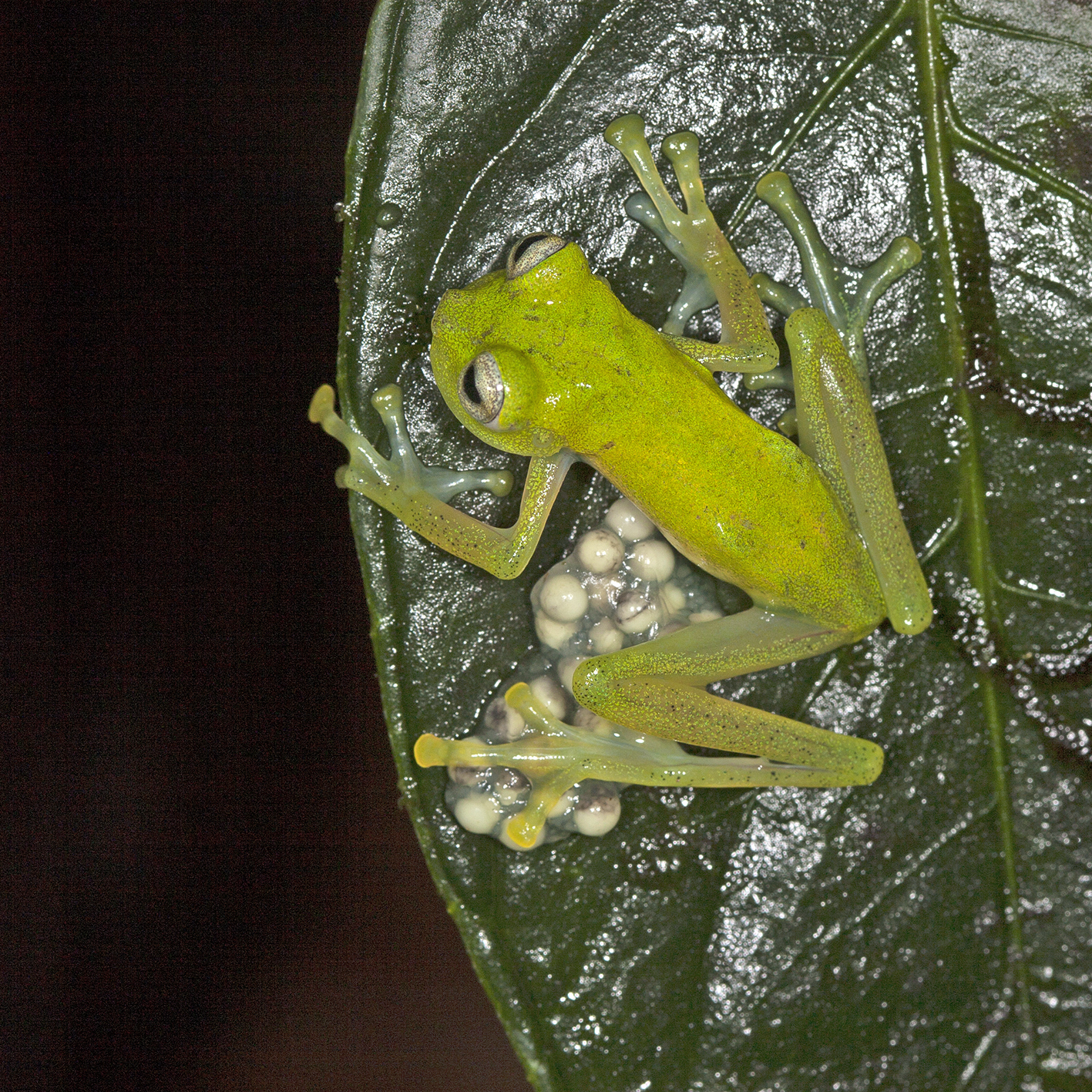

Conservation status
- Least Concern (IUCN 3.1)

Scientific classification
- Kingdom: Animalia
- Phylum: Chordata
- Class: Amphibia
- Order: Anura
- Family: Centrolenidae
- Genus: Nymphargus
- Species: N. griffithsi

Binomial name
- Nymphargus griffithsi (Goin, 1961)

Synonyms
- Cochranella griffithsi Goin, 1961; Centrolenella griffithsi (Goin, 1961)

= Nymphargus griffithsi =

Species of frog

Nymphargus griffithsi is a species of frog in the family Centrolenidae. It is found in Colombia and Ecuador. Its natural habitats are subtropical or tropical moist montane forests and rivers. It is threatened by habitat loss.
