= Nymphargus cariticommatus =

Conservation status
- Endangered (IUCN 3.1)

Scientific classification
- Kingdom: Animalia
- Phylum: Chordata
- Class: Amphibia
- Order: Anura
- Family: Centrolenidae
- Genus: Nymphargus
- Species: N. cariticommatus

Binomial name
- Nymphargus cariticommatus (Wild, 1994)

Synonyms
- Cochranella cariticommata Wild, 1994

Species of frog

Nymphargus cariticommatus is a species of frog in the family Centrolenidae. It is endemic to the southern Amazonian slopes of the Cordillera Oriental in Ecuador. Its natural habitats are old-growth cloud forests. It is threatened by habitat loss due to agricultural development and logging.
