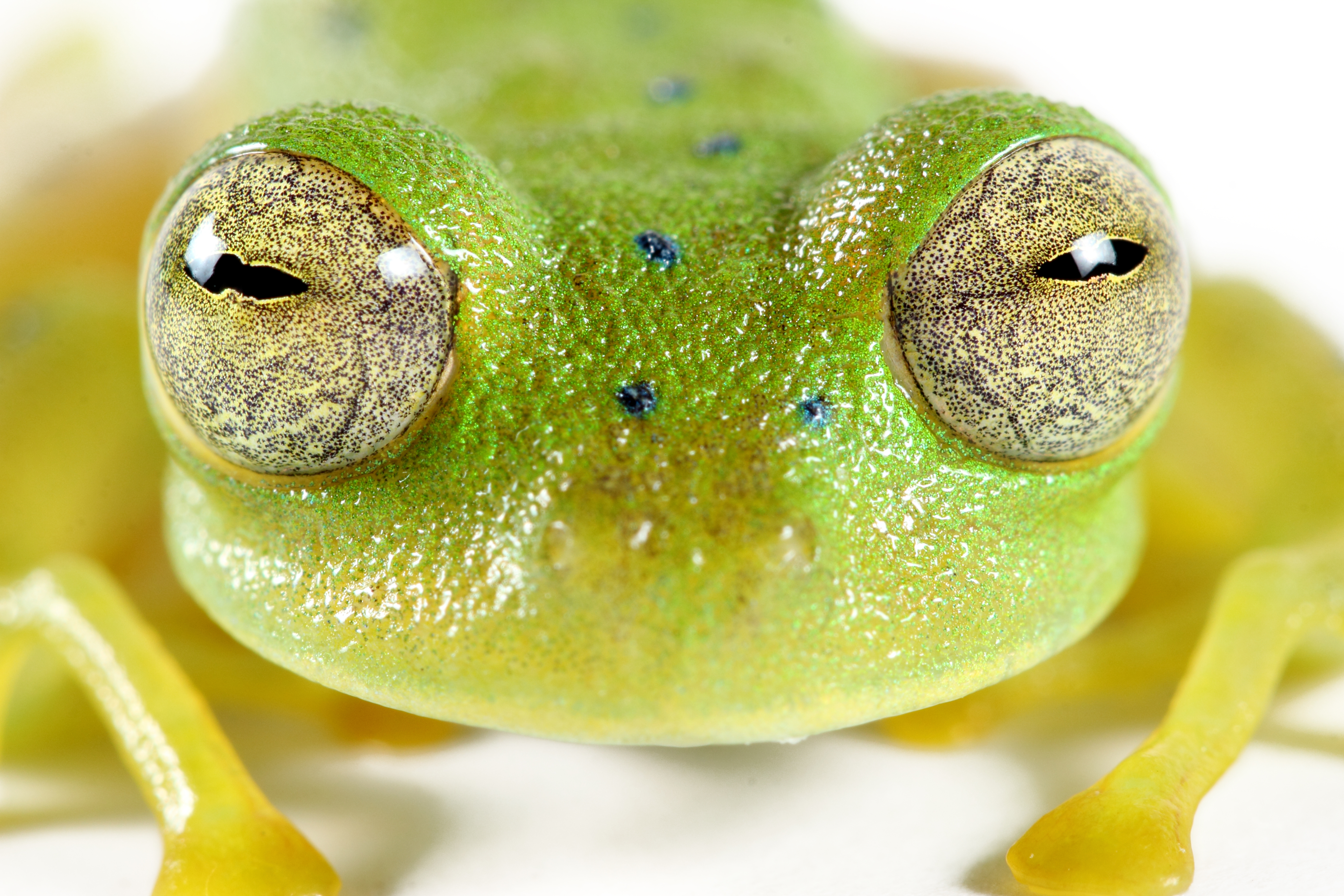

Conservation status
- Least Concern (IUCN 3.1)

Scientific classification
- Kingdom: Animalia
- Phylum: Chordata
- Class: Amphibia
- Order: Anura
- Family: Centrolenidae
- Genus: Nymphargus
- Species: N. cochranae

Binomial name
- Nymphargus cochranae (Goin, 1961)

Synonyms
- Cochranella cochranae Goin, 1961

= Nymphargus cochranae =

Species of amphibian

Nymphargus cochranae (common name: Cochran frog) is a species of frog in the family Centrolenidae. It is found in the lower Amazonian slopes of the Cordillera Occidental of Ecuador and adjacent Colombia, though the Colombian records require confirmation.

== Etymology ==
The specific name cochranae honours Doris Mable Cochran, an American herpetologist.

== Habitat and conservation ==
Its natural habitats are montane rainforest along streams with steep gradients. It is threatened by habitat destruction and degradation. There are no current initiatives to protect it.
