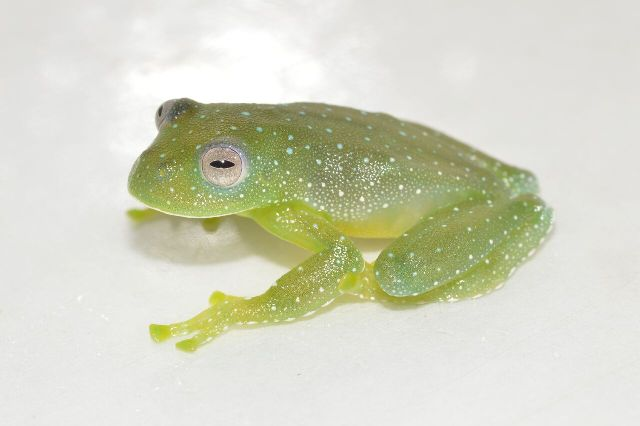

Conservation status
- Least Concern (IUCN 3.1)

Scientific classification
- Kingdom: Animalia
- Phylum: Chordata
- Class: Amphibia
- Order: Anura
- Family: Centrolenidae
- Genus: Cochranella
- Species: C. resplendens

Binomial name
- Cochranella resplendens (Lynch and Duellman, 1973)

Synonyms
- Centrolenella resplendens Lynch and Duellman, 1973; Cochranella phryxa Aguayo and Harvey, 2006

= Cochranella resplendens =

Species of frog

Cochranella resplendens is a species of frog in the family Centrolenidae. It is found in the upper Amazon Basin in southwestern Colombia, eastern Ecuador, northern Peru (Loreto and San Martín Region), and Bolivia (La Paz Department). There are also isolated records from the Cordillera Central in Antioquia, Colombia, and Amapá in northern Brazil. The specific name resplendens is derived from the Latin verb resplendo (="to glitter") and hints to the jewel-like appearance of this frog. It is sometimes known as the resplendent Cochran frog or resplendent glassfrog.

== Description ==
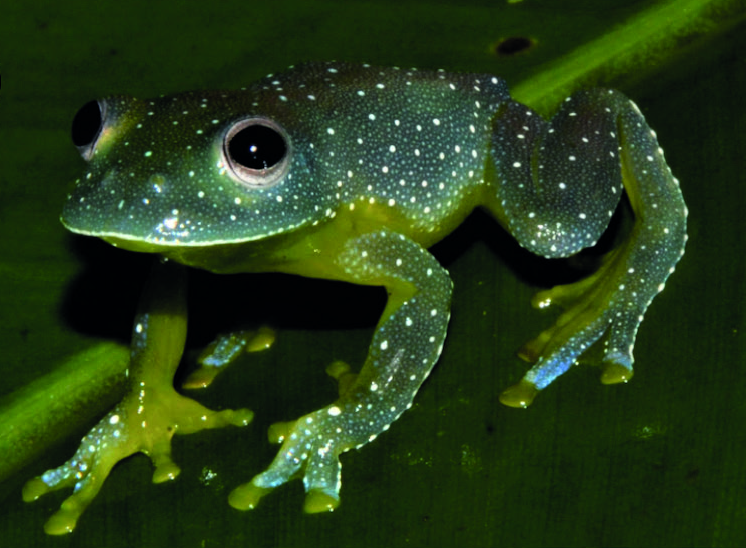
Amapá, Brazil

Males measure about 27 mm (1.1 in) in snout–vent length; female size is unknown. The snout is round in dorsal view and gradually inclined in lateral profile. The tympanum is visible but the tympanic membrane is pigmented as the surrounding skin and the tympanic annulus is only partially visible. A low low supratympanic fold is evident. The fingers are partially webbed and the toes are extensively webbed. The dorsum is dark green with many white to bluish-white dots. The ventral surfaces are white apart from the posterior one-fourth, which is transparent. The iris is whitish cream to beige, with a fine grey to brown reticulation.

== Habitat and conservation ==
The species' natural habitats are lowland tropical primary and secondary rainforests as well as sub-Andean forests. It occurs on vegetation near running water. The eggs are laid on leaves above streams. Outside the breeding season it might inhabit the forest canopy. It is a rare species threatened by habitat loss and fragmentation. Its rarity, however, may be an artefact caused by inadequate methods to observe it.
