= Nymphargus ruizi =

Conservation status
- Vulnerable (IUCN 3.1)

Scientific classification
- Kingdom: Animalia
- Phylum: Chordata
- Class: Amphibia
- Order: Anura
- Family: Centrolenidae
- Genus: Nymphargus
- Species: N. ruizi

Binomial name
- Nymphargus ruizi (Lynch, 1993)

Synonyms
- Cochranella ruizi Lynch, 1993

Species of amphibian

Nymphargus ruizi (common name: Ruiz's Cochran frog) is a species of frog in the family Centrolenidae, formerly placed in Cochranella. It is endemic to Colombia where it is known from the western slopes of the Cordillera Occidental and the eastern slopes of the Farallones de Cali. Its natural habitats are sub-Andean forests next to streams. It is threatened by habitat loss caused by agricultural expansion, logging, human settlement, and water pollution.

Nymphargus ruizi are relatively small frogs: adult males measure 24–26 mm (0.94–1.02 in) in snout–vent length. The skin of the dorsum is smooth, with or without spinules. Vomerine teeth are absent.
