= Leptodactylus griseigularis =

Conservation status
- Least Concern (IUCN 3.1)

Scientific classification
- Kingdom: Animalia
- Phylum: Chordata
- Class: Amphibia
- Order: Anura
- Family: Leptodactylidae
- Genus: Leptodactylus
- Species: L. griseigularis

Binomial name
- Leptodactylus griseigularis (Henle, 1981)

Synonyms
- Adenomera griseigularis Henle, 1981

Species of amphibian

Leptodactylus griseigularis is a species of frogs in the family Leptodactylidae. It is found in the Amazonian slopes of the Andes in Bolivia and Peru.

Leptodactylus griseigularis inhabit montane primary and lowland tropical moist forests. Scientists have seen the frog between 100 and 1800 meters above sea level. Scientists have reported the frog in some protected places, Madidi National Park and Carrasco National Park. Scientists think it could also live in Rio Abiseo National Park, Biabo Cordillera Azul Reserved Zone, Tingo Maria National Park, Yanachaga Chemillen National Park, Yanesha Communal Reserve, and Bosque de Protección San Matías San Carlos and Apurimac Reserved Zone.

Male Leptodactylus griseigularis grow to a snout–vent length of 35–51 mm (1.4–2.0 in) and females to 40–58 mm (1.6–2.3 in).
