= Rulyrana saxiscandens =

Conservation status
- Endangered (IUCN 3.1)

Scientific classification
- Kingdom: Animalia
- Phylum: Chordata
- Class: Amphibia
- Order: Anura
- Family: Centrolenidae
- Genus: Rulyrana
- Species: R. saxiscandens

Binomial name
- Rulyrana saxiscandens (Duellman and Schulte, 1993)

Synonyms
- Cochranella saxiscandens Duellman and Schulte, 1993; Cochranella tangarana Duellman and Schulte, 1993; Cochranella croceopodes Duellman and Schulte, 1993

Species of frog

Rulyrana saxiscandens is a species of frog in the family Centrolenidae. It is endemic to the Cordillera Escalera, Peru, approximately between the cities of Tarapoto and Moyobamba.

== Taxonomy and nomenclature ==
The delimitation of this species underwent a major change in 2014 when Rulyrana saxiscandens (originally Cochranella saxiscandens), Cochranella tangarana and Cochranella croceopodes were found to represent the same species. All three species were described in the same paper, so none of them have priority. Using the Principle of the First Reviser, Evan Twomey and colleagues chose C. tangarana and C. croceopodes as junior synonyms of Rulyrana saxiscandens.

== Habitat ==
Rulyrana saxiscandens have been found along streams and creeks and in the spray zones of waterfalls at elevations between 517–1,047 m (1,696–3,435 ft) above sea level. It does not occur in heavily modified habitats but can occur in secondary forests.
