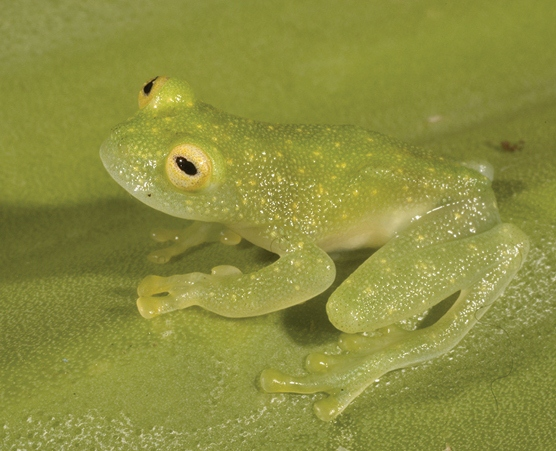

Conservation status
- Near Threatened (IUCN 3.1)

Scientific classification
- Kingdom: Animalia
- Phylum: Chordata
- Class: Amphibia
- Order: Anura
- Family: Centrolenidae
- Genus: Hyalinobatrachium
- Species: H. pellucidum

Binomial name
- Hyalinobatrachium pellucidum (Lynch and Duellman, 1973)

Synonyms
- Centrolenella pellucida Lynch and Duellman, 1973; Hyalinobatrachium lemur Duellman and Schulte, 1993

= Hyalinobatrachium pellucidum =

Rio Azuela glass frog

Species of amphibian

Hyalinobatrachium pellucidum, also known as the Rio Azuela glass frog, is a species of frog in the family Centrolenidae. It is found in lower montane rainforests on the Amazonian Andean slopes in Ecuador and Peru. The specific name pellucidum is Latin for "transparent" and refers to the transparent parietal peritoneum of this species.

== Description ==
This frog is about the size of a fingernail: males measure 20–22 mm (0.79–0.87 in) and females about 22 mm (0.87 in) in snout–vent length. The snout is truncated. The tympanum is partially hidden under skin. Dorsal skin is slightly granular. The dorsum is pale green with diffuse yellow dots. The fingers and toes are yellow and partly webbed. Lower surfaces are unpigmented and the heart is visible through the parietal peritoneum. The iris is pale silver bronze.

The male advertisement call is a single, monotone note, without amplitude modulation.

== Habitat and conservation ==
Its natural habitats are lower montane rainforests, cloud forests, as well as old-growth and secondary forests at elevations of 500–1,740 m (1,640–5,710 ft) above sea level. Individuals have been found at night on the upper surfaces of leaves of trees and herbs, about 1.5 to 4 metres above streams. Egg clutches are laid in vegetation where they may fall victim to predation from spiders.

The species is threatened by habitat loss caused by smallholder farming and logging. Ex-situ conservation programs have begun to help save this interesting creature.
