= Nymphargus chancas =

Conservation status
- Endangered (IUCN 3.1)

Scientific classification
- Kingdom: Animalia
- Phylum: Chordata
- Class: Amphibia
- Order: Anura
- Family: Centrolenidae
- Genus: Nymphargus
- Species: N. chancas

Binomial name
- Nymphargus chancas (Duellman and Schulte, 1993)

Synonyms
- Cochranella chancas Duellman and Schulte, 1993

Species of amphibian

Nymphargus chancas (common name: Peru Cochran frog) is a species of frog in the family Centrolenidae. Until recently it was only known from its type locality in the Lamas Province in Peru; however, it is now known to occur more widely in the northern San Martín Region of Peru, extending into the Cordillera del Cóndor in Zamora-Chinchipe Province, Ecuador.

== Description ==
Adult males measure 25–26 mm (1.0–1.0 in) in snout–vent length; female length has not been reported. The snout is truncate, or sometimes slightly protruding laterally. The tympanum is visible, with its upper hidden by the supra-tympanic fold and tubercles. The toes are two-thirds webbed. Dorsal coloration varies from dull yellow green to orange yellow or olive gray. There are distinct yellow flecks on the dorsum, which can occasionally belarge and bright. However, individuals can change their color rapidly. One specimen had prominent occellations that faded after capture. The iris can be pale yellowish-bronze, or silvery-white with a faint yellow suffusion.

== Habitat and conservation ==
Nymphargus chancas is an arboreal frog found in montane cloud forests near streams. Its elevational range is 1,003–1,430 m (3,291–4,692 ft) above sea level. It is nocturnal.

Its conservation status is Endangered. The Cordillera del Cóndor population is threatened by habitat destruction and pollution associated with mining.
