= Chimerella mariaelenae =

Conservation status
- Least Concern (IUCN 3.1)

Scientific classification
- Kingdom: Animalia
- Phylum: Chordata
- Class: Amphibia
- Order: Anura
- Family: Centrolenidae
- Genus: Chimerella
- Species: C. mariaelenae

Binomial name
- Chimerella mariaelenae (Cisneros-Heredia & McDiarmid, 2006)

Synonyms
- Centrolene mariaelenae Cisneros-Heredia and McDiarmid, 2006

Species of amphibian

Coordinates: 4°15′S 78°56′W

Chimerella mariaelenae is a species of glassfrog that inhabits on the Andean slopes of eastern Ecuador and northeastern Peru, possibly also in the adjacent Colombia. The species was described as new to science by Diego F. Cisneros-Heredia and Roy Wallace McDiarmid.

== Type locality ==
Collected along a small stream, tributary of the Jambue River, ca. 16 km S from Zamora, Podocarpus National Park (ca. 04º15'S, 78º56'W, 1820 m), on the western slope of Contrafuerte de Tzunantza, Cordillera Oriental, eastern slopes of the Andes, Zamora-Chinchipe Province, Republic of Ecuador.

== Diagnostic characters ==
Chimerella mariaelenae is diagnosed from other species of the family Centrolenidae by the combination of the following characters: (1) vomerine teeth absent; (2) bones white in preservative (unknown in life); (3) parietal peritoneum clear without guanophores in a bib-like fashion; guanophores covering on the pericardial, hepatic and visceral peritonea, except for the clear gall bladder; (4) color in preservative, dorsal and flank surfaces cream with many small dark lavender punctuations and scattered larger dark flecks; (5) webbing absent between fingers I and II, basal between fingers II and III, outer fingers III2½–2½IV; (6) webbing on feet I2–2½II2–3III2–3IV2b–1bV; (7) snout bluntly truncate in dorsal view and truncate in profile; notch in lower lip absent; nostrils elevated, indentation between the nostrils; loreal region concave; (8) dorsal skin shagreen; (9) no dermal folds on hands, forearms, feet, or tarsus; (10) humeral spine present in male holotype; (11) tympanum oriented posterolaterally with light dorsal inclination; tympanic annulus rather indistinct; supratympanic fold weak; (12) snout-vent length in male holotype 19.0 mm; females unknown; (13) prepollical spine not protruding externally; unpigmented nuptial excrescence Type I; (14) pair of large, round, flat tubercles on ventral surfaces of thighs below vent; other anal ornamentation absent, ventral skin granular and not enameled; (15) first finger longer than second, (16) liver apparently bulbous (but see Discussion); (17) eye diameter larger than width of disc on finger III; (18) iris grey in preservative; (19) melanophores absent on fingers and toes except for a few at the base of Toe V; (20) the advertisement call is unknown for this species.

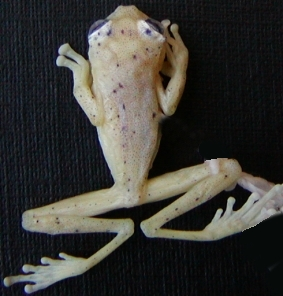
Holotype

== Etymology ==
The specific name of Chimerella mariaelenae is a noun in the genitive case and a patronym for María Elena Heredia, mother of one of the authors that described the species.

== Distribution ==
Centrolene mariaelenae is known from several localities on montane forest on eastern Ecuador and northeastern Peru. It inhabits in old secondary-growth and primary Low Montane Evergreen Forest.
