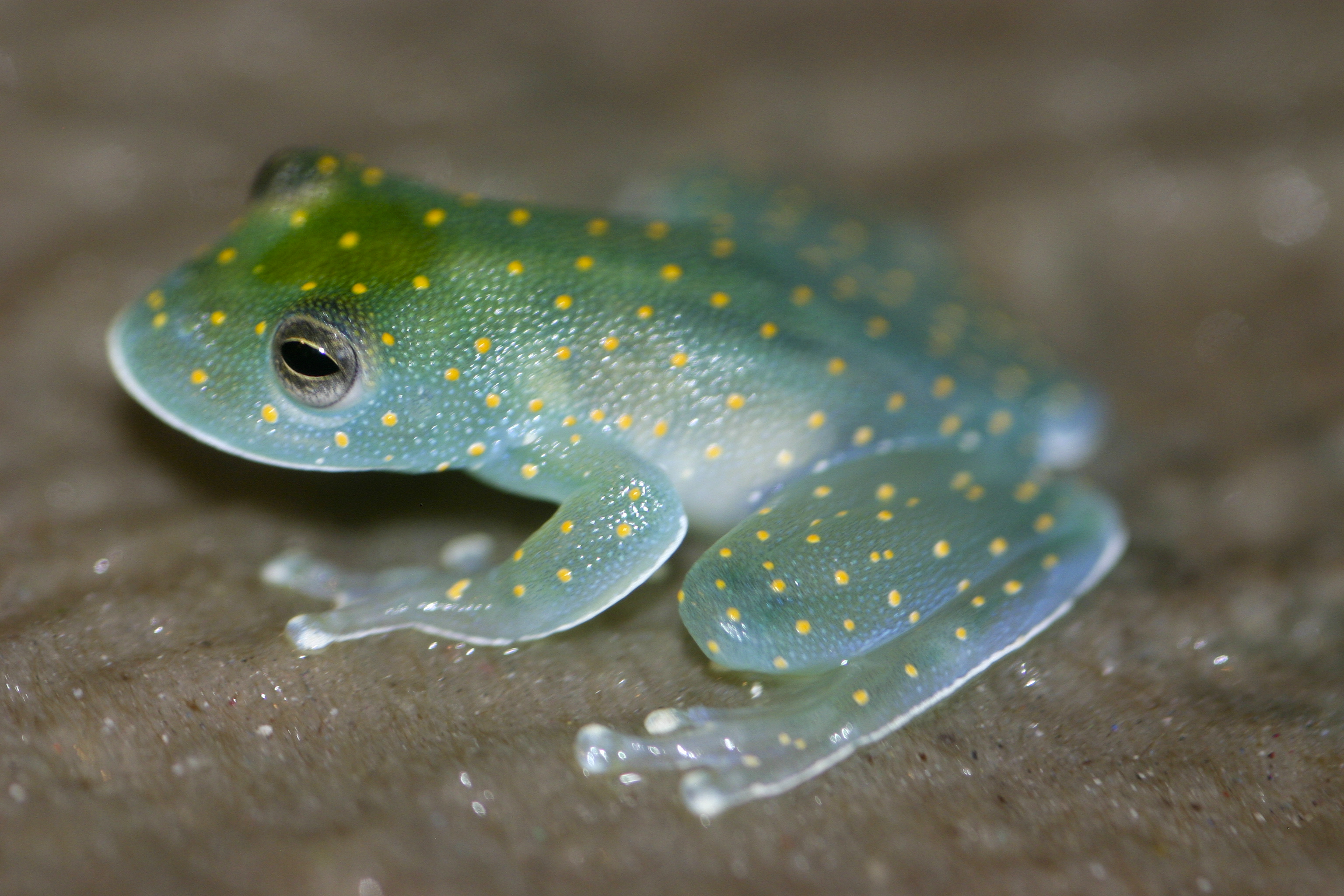
- Cochranella euknemos

Scientific classification
- Kingdom: Animalia
- Phylum: Chordata
- Class: Amphibia
- Order: Anura
- Family: Centrolenidae
- Subfamily: Centroleninae
- Genus: Cochranella; Taylor, 1951

Type species
- Centrolenella granulosa Taylor, 1949

Species
- 8 species (see text)

= Cochranella =

Genus of glass frogs, family Centrolenidae

Cochranella is a genus of glass frogs, family Centrolenidae. They are found in Central America from Honduras southward to the Amazonian and Andean cloud forests of Colombia, Ecuador, Peru, and Bolivia.

== Etymology ==
The generic name Cochranella honors Doris Mable Cochran, an American herpetologist. Accordingly, a common name Cochran frogs has been coined for the genus.

== Taxonomy and systematics ==
Cochranella was first described by Edward Harrison Taylor in 1951. The current delimitation of this genus follows from the work by Juan Manuel Guayasamin and his colleagues published in 2009 (with some later adjustments). These authors remedied the polyphyly of the genus by partitioning it into several new genera.

The diagnostic characteristics of the genus are the following: (1) humeral spines are absent (small spine present in C. litoralis); (2) digestive tract is white (translucent in Cochranella nola) and the lobed liver is covered by a transparent hepatic peritoneum; (3) ventral parietal peritoneum is white anteriorly and transparent posteriorly; (4) webbing between the fingers III–IV is moderate to extensive; (5) bones are green in life; (6) dorsum is lavender in preserved specimens; (7) dentigerous process of the vomer and vomerine teeth are present (absent in C. litoralis); (8) males call from the upper surfaces of leaves and females deposit eggs on the upper sides of leaves along streams; (9) quadratojugal bone is articulating with maxilla.

== Species ==
The AmphibiaWeb lists 15 Cochranella species, including ones that the Amphibian Species of the World considers as having uncertain placement within the subfamily Centroleninae (Incertae Sedis). Currently eight species are placed in this genus:

Species	Image
Cochranella erminea Torres-Gastello, Suárez-Segovia, and Cisneros-Heredia, 2007	A green frog with black and white spots and grey eyes, on a leaf
Cochranella euknemos (Savage and Starrett, 1967)	
Cochranella granulosa (Taylor, 1949)	
Cochranella guayasamini Twomey, Delia, and Castroviejo-Fisher, 2014	
Cochranella litoralis (Ruiz-Carranza and Lynch, 1996)	
Cochranella mache Guayasamin and Bonaccorso, 2004	
Cochranella nola Harvey, 1996	
Cochranella resplendens (Lynch and Duellman, 1973)	
