= Paraguayan Chaco =

Region in Paraguay

Coordinates: 22°06′21.1″S 59°15′23.9″W

Paraguayan Chaco, represented in light green.

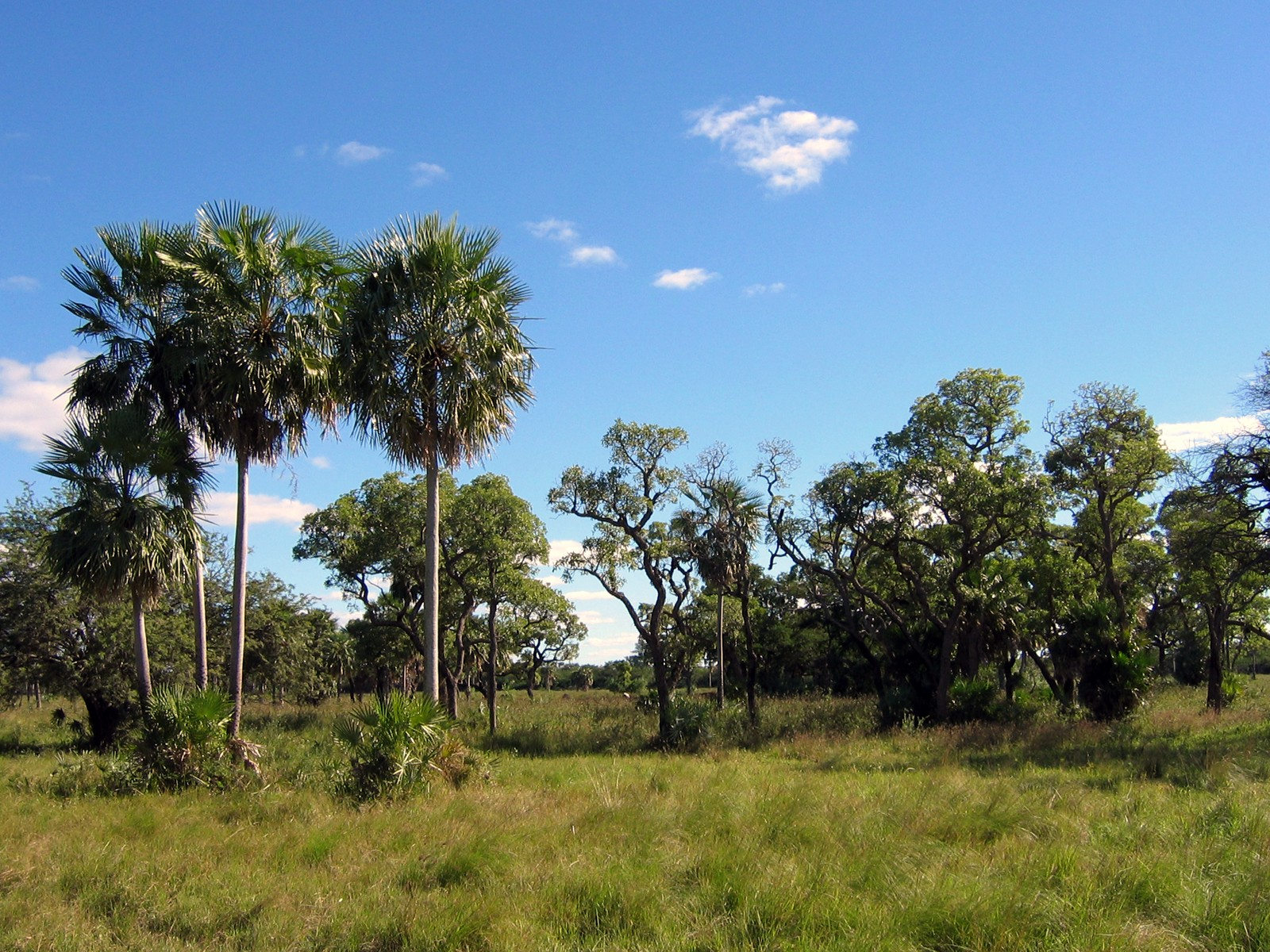
A part of the Paraguayan Chaco

The Paraguayan Chaco, or Región Occidental (Western Region), is a semi-arid region in Paraguay with low population density. It is the Paraguayan part of the Gran Chaco. The area is being rapidly deforested, with the highest deforestation rate in the Gran Chaco and 50% of the forest projected to be lost by 2030. Covering of 61% of Paraguay's land area, but with little population, the Chaco is one of the most sparsely inhabited areas in South America.

The surrounding Gran Chaco area is also a large, sparsely populated region. Many of those living in the region are indigenous. It covers the departments of Boquerón, Alto Paraguay and the Department of Presidente Hayes, Paraguay.

The Paraguayan Chaco region, officially bordered since May 14, 1879, was the scene of the longest territorial war in South America, an armed conflict between Paraguay and Bolivia that lasted from 1932 to 1935. It is also home to sites of historical significance that have been preserved, including Boquerón, Campo Grande, Via Campo, Nanawa, the site of the battle of Cañada Strongest, Carmen, Kilometro 7, Picuiba, and Villamontes, amongst others.

== Location ==
The Paraguayan Chaco is located between the Pilcomayo and Paraguay Rivers, which provide saline soils that attract a wide variety of plants and animals. Its boundaries are the border with Argentina along the Pilcomayo River to the west; the border with Brazil over the mouth of the Apa River to the south-east; the border with Bolivia to the north; and the border with the Región Oriental (Eastern Region) to the south.

== Indigenous peoples of the Paraguayan Chaco ==
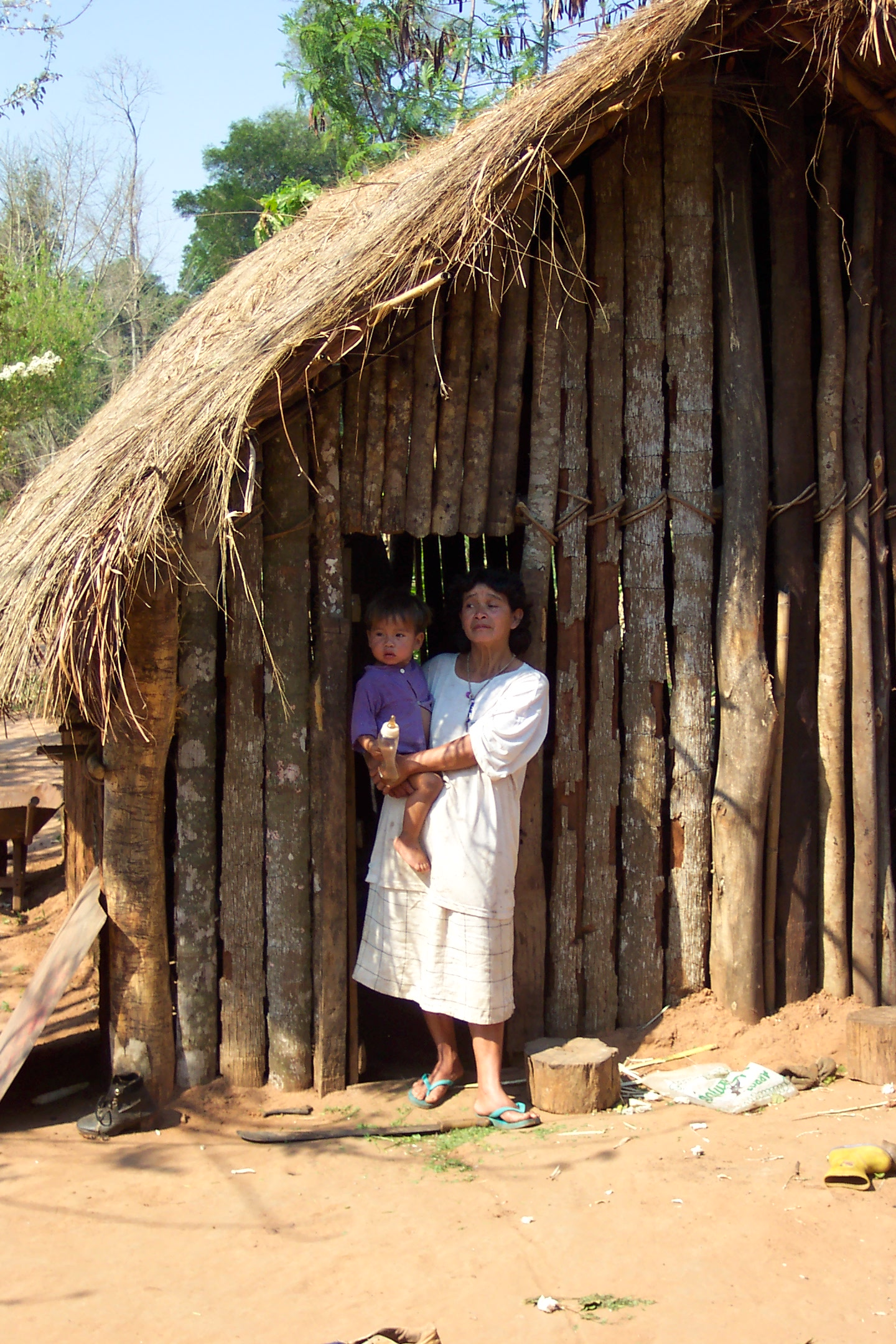
Indigenous mother and child in the Paraguayan Chaco

The majority of the Indigenous peoples in Paraguay live in the Chaco. These include the following groups:

- Ayoreo (Zamuco)
- Chamacoco (Ishir)
  - Ebytoso
  - Tomáraho
- Chané
- Chiripá people
- Chorote
- Guana
- Guaraní
- Lengua (Enxet)
- Nivaclé (Chulupí)
- Macá
- Mbayá
- Pai-Tavyter
- Sanapaná
- Toba

The language groups and their locations are as follows:

- Toba Maskoy: on the Paraguay River in the central-east.
- Nivaclé: near the Pilcomayo River in the south-east.
- Zamuco, Chamacoco: on the Paraguay River in the north-east.
- Enxet-Enenhlet: central and lower Chaco.

== Animals ==
The Chaco has an abundance of wildlife. Larger animals present in the region include jaguar, ocelot, puma, tapir, giant armadillo, giant anteater, multiple species of foxes, a number of small wildcats, the agouti (a large rodent), the capybara (water hog), the maned wolf, the palustrian deer, peccaries, including the endemic Chacoan peccary, and the guanaco (the wild relative of the llama). The region has an abundant and varied bird population and one of the largest populations of the greater rhea (or nandu), a large flightless South American bird. The streams host more than 400 fish species, among which are the salmon-like dorado and the flesh-eating piranha. The region is home to a number of insect species, some of which can cause discomfort for travellers. Reptiles are also abundant, with lizards and at least 60 known snake species, including pit vipers and constrictors. The region is also home to a number of unique amphibians, including the iconic waxy monkey tree frog Phyllomedusa sauvagii that produces a waxy secretion to prevent drying out and coraline frog Leptodactylus laticeps that spends the dry season deep in a burrow, emerging with the rains to feed on other frogs.

== Flora ==
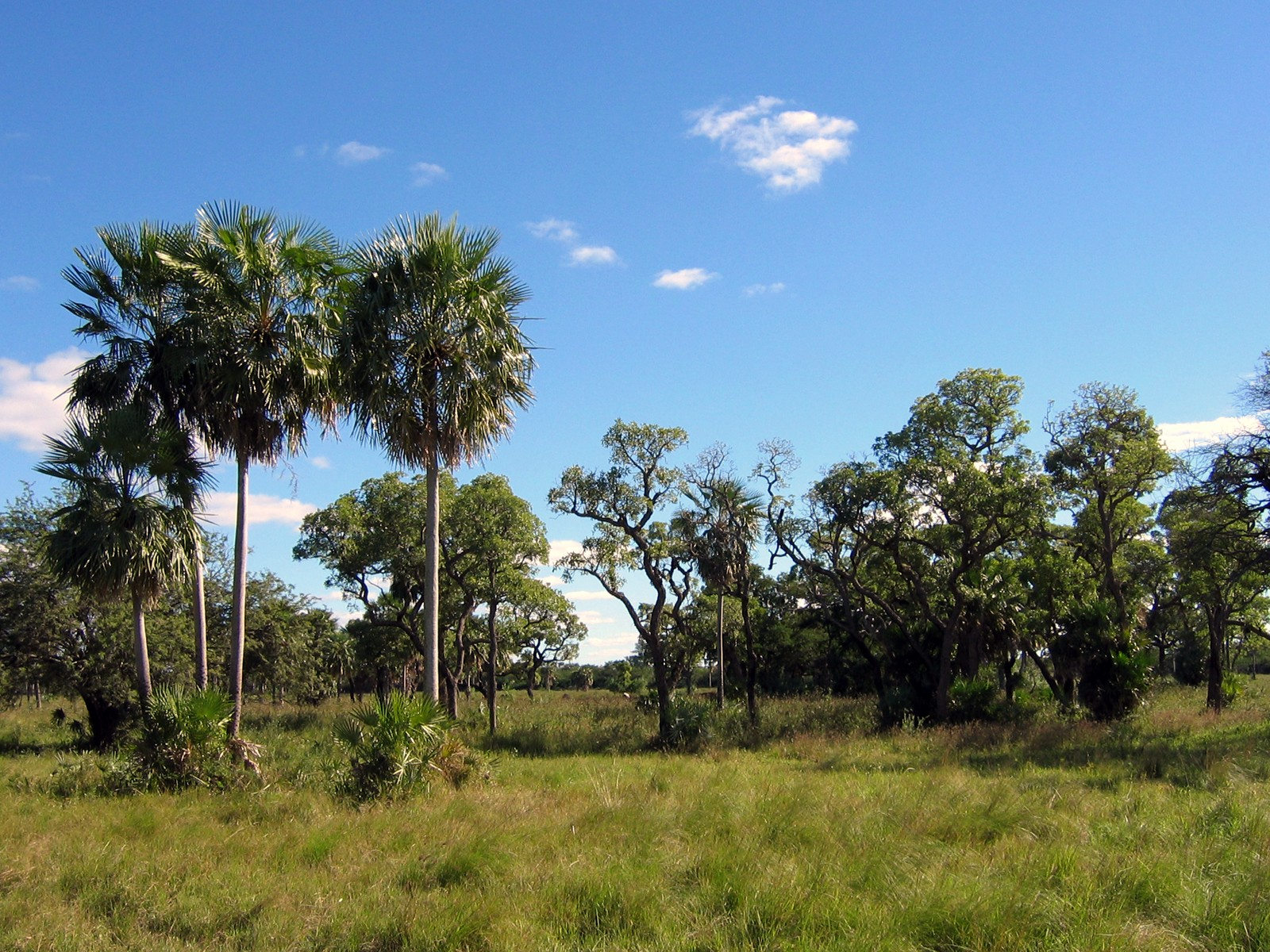
Chaco Boreal, Paraguay

The vegetation of the Chaco varies from the east to the west, reflecting the changing nature of the soil. Eastern Chaco is noted for its park-like landscape of clustered trees and shrubs interspersed with tall, herbaceous savannahs. To the west, a wide transition zone grades into the espinal, a dry forest of spiny, thorny shrubs and low trees. Chaco's vegetation has adapted to grow in arid conditions, and is highly varied and exceedingly complex. One of the most impressive vegetation formations is called the quebrachales, which consists of vast, low hardwood forests where various species of quebracho trees are dominant. The quebracho tree is economically important as a source of tannin and lumber. These forests cover extensive areas away from the rivers; nearer the rivers they occupy the higher, better-drained sites, giving rise to a landscape in which the forests appear as islands amid a sea of savannah grasses growing as high as a person on horseback. In the more arid western Chaco, thorn forests, the continuity of which is occasionally broken by palm groves, saline steppes, and savannas, created by fire or deforestation, are dominated by another quebracho tree that has a lower tannin content and is used most often for lumber.

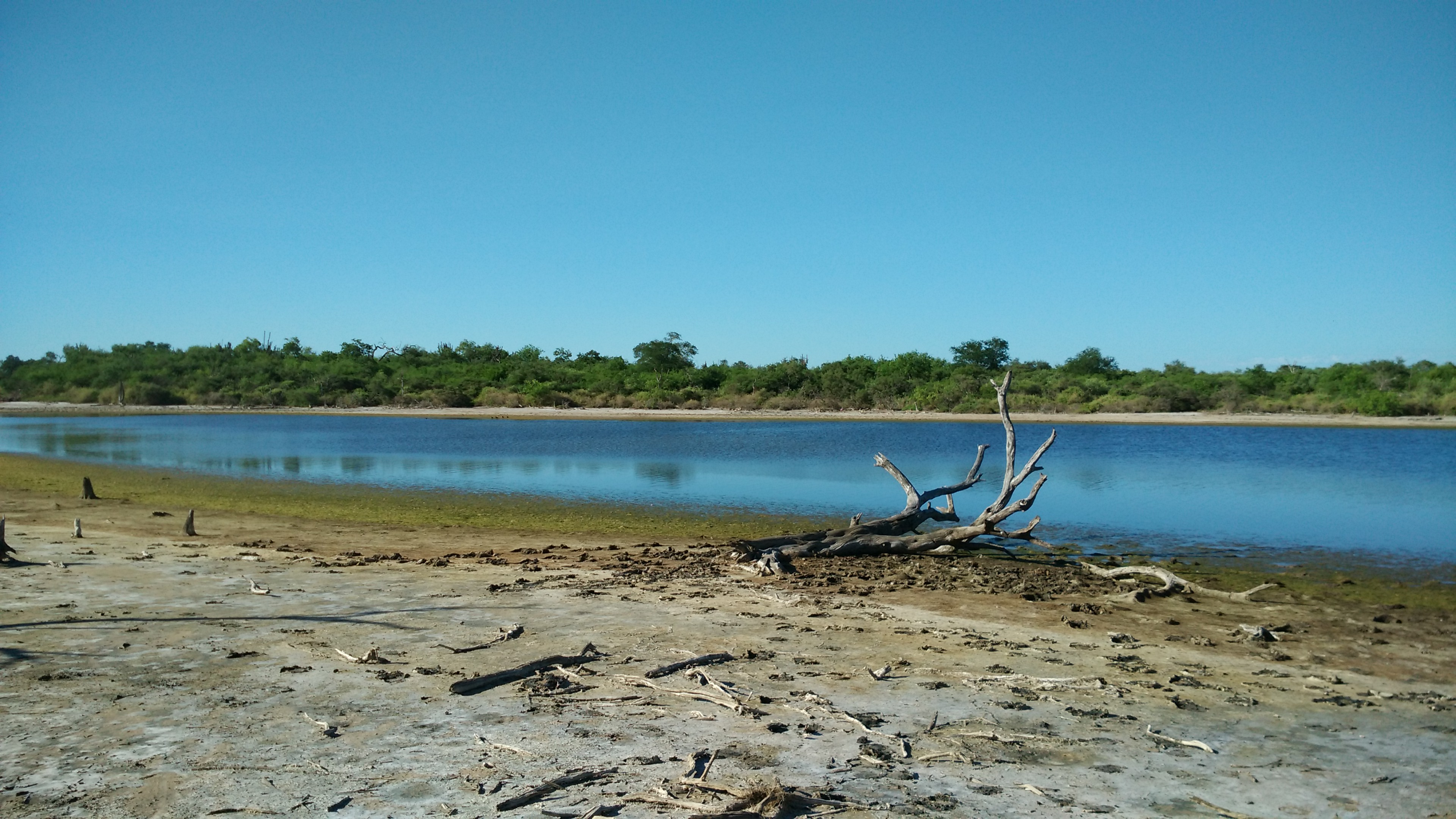
Lagoon in the Paraguayan Chaco.

There is also a marked increase in the number and density of thorny species, among which the notorious vinal (Prosopis ruscifolia) was declared a national plague in Argentina because of how its thorns, up to a foot in length, posed a livestock hazard in the agricultural lands it invaded.

== Main features ==
Ecotourism remains a potential industry for the region because of its rich biodiversity, allowing for a type of ecotourism similar to that seen in the Amazon.

The region remains of interest to hunting enthusiasts. It also hosts the annual Trans Chaco Rally, a prominent automobile race, which is considered one of the most difficult in the world, mainly because of the dusty, dry roads which make up its routes, and the extreme heat.

Chaco is known for its cultural, religious and economic diversity. The Indigenous peoples of the Gran Chaco maintain their cultures, particularly in the northern Chaco. The Northern Chaco is also known as an ideal place to purchase indigenous fine crafts. In the forest reserves, the Sanapaná and Nivaclé peoples speak the Sanapaná and Nivaclé languages, respectively.

Karanda'y is the material used to make handbags, wallets, vases, porta tereré (bags to hold thermos flasks for tereré, the typical summer drink), carrying baskets, and mats. The natives are experts in natural medicine. The thorny varieties of plants are replacing deciduous trees in these areas.

Chaco also offers an excellent option for rural tourism. One place offering rural tourism opportunities is the area Estancia La Patria, Department of Boquerón, Colony Neuland, which was created by the national government with the aim of boosting the development of this area of the country. It is located 110 kilometers (70 miles) from Infante Rivarola, a military post on the border with Bolivia.

The Chaco area is famous for the large number of hunters who visit, despite a ban on hunting of endangered animals.

It is a high floodplain with a gentle slope to the east, and experiences relatively little rainfall (400 mm; 16" per year). Some areas are flooded occasionally, during which species adapted to such an environment appear. The soils in the region are salty, and their use is limited because of their aridity. The Chaco is irrigated by the rivers Pilcomayo and Paraguay, both of which sprout many tributaries.

== National parks ==
- National Park Defensores del Chaco - 7800 km² (3000 sq. mi.)
- National Park Tinfunqué - 2800 km² (1000 sq. mi.)
- National Park Teniente Enciso - 400 km² (150 sq. mi.)

== Main cities ==
- Villa Hayes
- Benjamin Aceval
- Mariscal Estigarribia
- Filadelfia

Filadelfia is of great importance to the region's economy, mainly because of its lucrative dairy.

== See also ==
- Deforestation in Paraguay
- Chaco (disambiguation)
- Departments of Bolivia
- Departments of Paraguay
