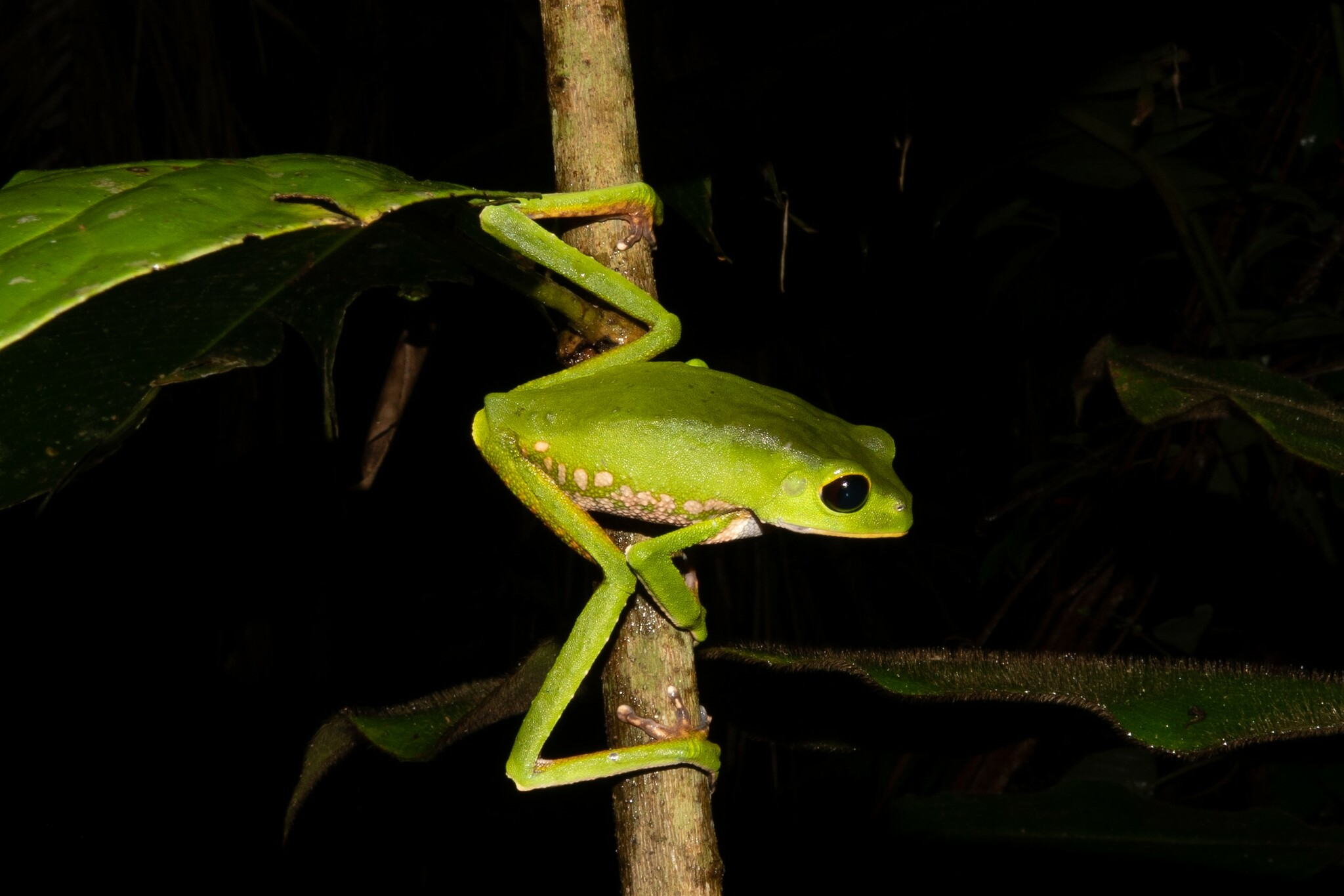

Conservation status
- Least Concern (IUCN 3.1)

Scientific classification
- Kingdom: Animalia
- Phylum: Chordata
- Class: Amphibia
- Order: Anura
- Family: Phyllomedusidae
- Genus: Phyllomedusa
- Species: P. chaparroi

Binomial name
- Phyllomedusa chaparroi Castroviejo-Fisher, Köhler, De la Riva, and Padial, 2017

= Phyllomedusa chaparroi =

Species of tree frog

Phyllomedusa chaparroi is a species of treefrog in the subfamily Phyllomedusinae endemic to Peru. Scientists have only seen it in two places. This frog has been observed between 537 and 650 meters above sea level.

The adult male frog measures approximately 67.9 to 77.5 mm long in snout-vent length. This frog resembles Phyllomedusa camba very closely but the two species can be distinguished in nuclear and mitochondrial markers.

The iris of the eye is red-brown in color with tiny, indistinct orange spots.

This frog has been found in primary and secondary humid forest. Specimens were collected at night near temporary ponds. They were on plants .5-1.5 meters above the ground. The female frog lays her eggs in a foam nest situated on a leaf hanging over the water. When the eggs hatch, the tadpoles fall into the pond below.

The International Union for Conservation of Nature has classified this frog as least concern because of its large range.
