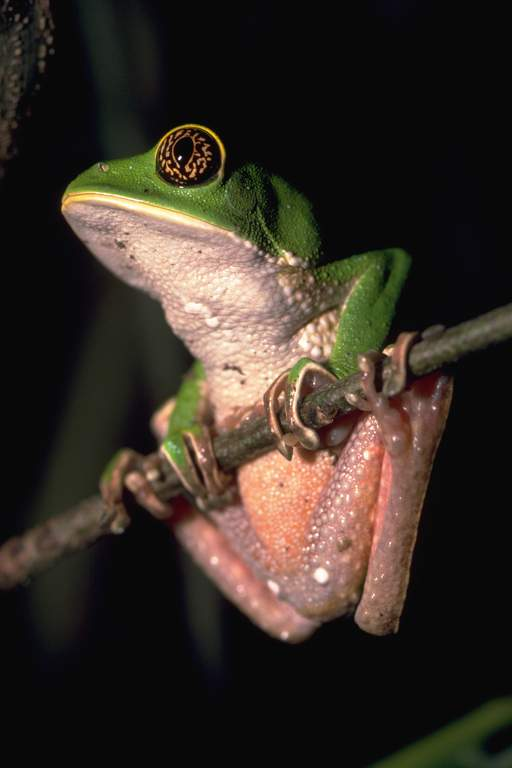

Conservation status
- Least Concern (IUCN 3.1)

Scientific classification
- Kingdom: Animalia
- Phylum: Chordata
- Class: Amphibia
- Order: Anura
- Family: Phyllomedusidae
- Genus: Phyllomedusa
- Species: P. trinitatis

Binomial name
- Phyllomedusa trinitatis Mertens, 1926

= Phyllomedusa trinitatis =

Species of frog

Phyllomedusa trinitatis (known as the leaf-nesting frog, Trinidadian leaf frog, or Trinidadian monkey frog) is a species of frog in the subfamily Phyllomedusinae. It is found in Venezuela and the island of Trinidad.

== Description ==
P. trinitatis is an arboreal frog with a bright green body, black and yellow eyes, and brown chin and chest. The skin of its back is "finely granular", dotted with small tubercles. Frogs are between 50-80mm in length and display sexual dimorphism, with the females being roughly 1.5 times larger in size than their male counterparts. The limbs lack webbing, and instead have fore and hindlimbs with adhesive toe pads and opposable first fingers and toes, like other Hylidae tree frogs, making it well-adapted for climbing and traversing the treetop terrain. Males lack external vocal slits.

== Distribution ==
P. trinitatis can be found throughout northern Venezuela in the states of Distrito Federal, Sucre, Vargas, Miranda, Aragua, Carabobo, Yaracuy, Monagas, northern Bolivar and Guárico, and eastern Falcón. On the island of Trinidad, it can be found in many areas including Arima, Chatham, and the Northern Range.

== Diet ==
Researchers have proposed that P. trinitatis stalks its prey due to its slightly considerable size, slow movement, and toe pad shape. P. trinitatis is known to eat insects such as field crickets.

== Predators ==
In a study conducted in Trinidad, West Indies, researchers studied the predation of P. trinitatis tadpoles by the larvae of the dragonfly Pantala flavescens, one of the predators of P. trinitatis during its tadpole stage. Their research focused on whether the larvae preferred tadpoles of P. trinitatis or Engystomops pustulosus as prey, especially when the density of each species varied. Their results demonstrated that the relative prey density has no significant bearing on the dragonfly's preference of hunting for P. trinitatis tadpoles over Engystomops pustulosus

Before adulthood, phorid flies in Trinidad feed on P. trinitatis eggs and are known to decimate entire clutches.

== Defence ==
P. trinitatis exhibits several defences to evade predators and survive in hostile environments. As the frog flees its predators, it can release poison from glands found on its back. Males may also remain silent rather than calling to prevent attracting predators to their locations.

By probing the glands of P. trinitatis via electrical stimulation, scientists have isolated insulinotropic peptides from the frog's secretions. After purifying the secreted fluids of a few frogs, scientists purified four peptides that significantly promoted insulin release in BRIN-BD11 cells, which are capable of secreting insulin. Researchers isolated a 28-amino acid peptide fully homologous to the C-terminal of the precursor to dermaseptin BIV. These results suggest that P. trinitatis secretes an antimicrobial as part of its immune defence, though the specific mechanism of action is still unknown.

Other studies have identified other defence peptides secreted from the frog's skin. One study found 15 dermaseptin peptides with varying antimicrobial properties and evolutionarily conserved amino acid regions. One of the peptides discovered had only one cysteine residue in its structure (LTWKIPTRFCGVT), an uncommon distribution. The most effective antimicrobial peptides found were phylloseptin-1.1TR and 3.1TR. Like defence proteins found in other frogs, these peptides exhibited more potency against Gram-positive than Gram-negative bacteria.

Some studies provide insight into the structure-activity relationship between phyllo statins. Such studies of immunomodulation and insulinotropic activity suggest that these frogs could potentially be used to develop drug templates for anti-inflammatory and type 2 diabetes treatment.

== Mating ==
The mating season for P. trinitatis typically takes place from the end of the dry season until the beginning of the rainy season. The species exhibits sexual dimorphism, and females are generally larger than males.

Mating rituals of P. trinitatis transpire within foliage surrounding small bodies of water, encompassing ditches and similar locales. P. trinitatis is known to call out to mates similarly to other frogs. An audio spectrogram of the call of the P. trinitatis showed it to have a principal note along with five secondary notes. The loud call can function as a deterrent for other males attempting to seek female partners. The fundamental frequency was believed to be 500 Hz while the dominant frequencies were considered to be around 800 Hz. Additionally, more vocal males often travel greater distances in the environment. However, some males stay in place while calling out to other frogs. Male frogs exhibit leg-waving behaviour to communicate non-verbally and to deter potential adversaries. This behaviour serves as a measure to preclude physical confrontations.

=== Breeding site attendance ===
Most females only attend once in breeding, but for those who attended more than once, the nesting interval averaged 27.6 days. Males showed high pond loyalty; a few participated in two ponds while always preferring one. There are three attendance patterns for males. Most frogs attend on multiple nights, others may have sporadic attendance, or attend only once, however, there is no evidence that a particular model is the best choice for reproductive success.

== Development and life cycle ==
=== Life cycle ===
P. trinitatis mate and lay eggs in vegetation above water. The eggs are covered with jelly capsules or plugs produced by the mother. The jelly plugs are made of 96 to 97% water and 2 to 3% dry matter. They are composed of mucopolysaccharides and possess a dense core surrounded by a matrix. The jelly plug and capsule prevent water absorption during rainfall, since unlike the eggs of other amphibians, Phyllomedusa eggs cannot survive in water. The mechanism by which embryos survive with potential hypoxia is unknown. Like other frogs in the genus Phyllomedusa, P. trinitatis enclose their eggs in folded leaves. The leaf case protects the egg clutch and shields the jelly plug from rainfall.

P. trinitatis has no demonstrated leaf preference, in type or number, when constructing their nest. As one embryo hatches, it influences other eggs to hatch, and after hatching, the tadpoles fall into the water.

=== Physical development ===
The adult toe pad has some mucosal pores in "Hexagonal-shaped cells". The frog has flat pads that lack lateral grooves on the front of each digit. This distinguishes the Trinidad frog from other tree frogs or hylids with different features, such as convex pads. P. trinitatis has about 12 cell layers on its toe pad, including columnar and cuboidal cells.

Using Gosner's (1960) staging table for frog development, they showed the stage-by-stage changes that occur in frog toe pads. For this page, when a stage is mentioned, it will concern Gosner's staging paradigm rather than Kenny's staging (1968). It is noted that in earlier stages of development, the forelimb appears to develop faster than the hindlimb based on how separated the digits were. By stage 38, all digits were layered with an epithelium of simple squamous cells. At stage 39, the long toe had an expanded distal end and the toe pad had widened. At stage 40, the circumferent groove became very apparent in the toe pads and was fully developed by stage 46, the end of metamorphosis.

Researchers have claimed that, unlike other species of frogs, P. trinitatis has no evidence of having hatching gland cells during its development. Looking at Gosner stages 18 to 23, the scientists did not see hatching gland cells on the heads of the frogs. These findings suggest that P. trinitatis might have a different hatching mechanism distinct from other frogs of other species. Other studies, however, have shown conflicting results. Embryos farther along in their development were shown to have hatching gland cells on the laterodorsal surface of the head.

== Research limitations ==
One study focused on finding practices to track the frogs for field research and found that neither bobbins (Note: Thread bobbin tracking is a method of data collection sometimes used by herpetologists. See this paper for further elaboration.) nor radio tags were suitable. These tracking devices (15 to 20% of the frog's weight) had no significant effect on the distance the frog traveled, but the frogs became lethargic and less mobile by the third day of the trial. Radio tags failed to accurately locate the frogs in areas of high altitude or vegetation due to signal interference. Bobbins often led to physical harm like bruising. Initial attempts of using fluorescent dye proved ineffective as the dye had a deleterious impact on the frog.
