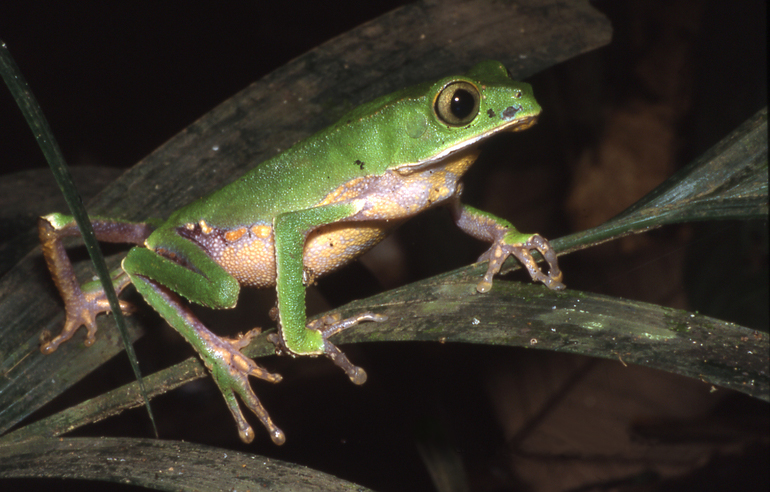

Conservation status
- Least Concern (IUCN 3.1)

Scientific classification
- Kingdom: Animalia
- Phylum: Chordata
- Class: Amphibia
- Order: Anura
- Family: Hylidae
- Genus: Phyllomedusa
- Species: P. vaillantii

Binomial name
- Phyllomedusa vaillantii Boulenger, 1882

Synonyms
- Phyllomedusa blombergi Funkhouser, 1957; Phyllomedusa feltoni Shreve, 1935; Phyllomedusa perlata Boulenger, 1884 "1883"

= White-lined leaf frog =

Species of amphibian

The white-lined leaf frog (Phyllomedusa vaillantii) is a species of frog in the subfamily Phyllomedusinae. It is found in northern South America. Its natural habitats are subtropical or tropical moist lowland forest, subtropical or tropical swampland, rivers, and freshwater marshes. It is threatened by habitat loss.

== Description ==
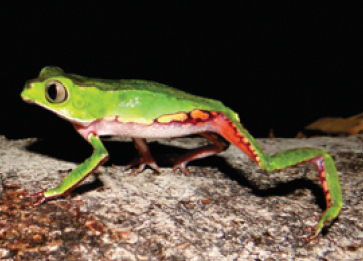
Amapá, Brazil

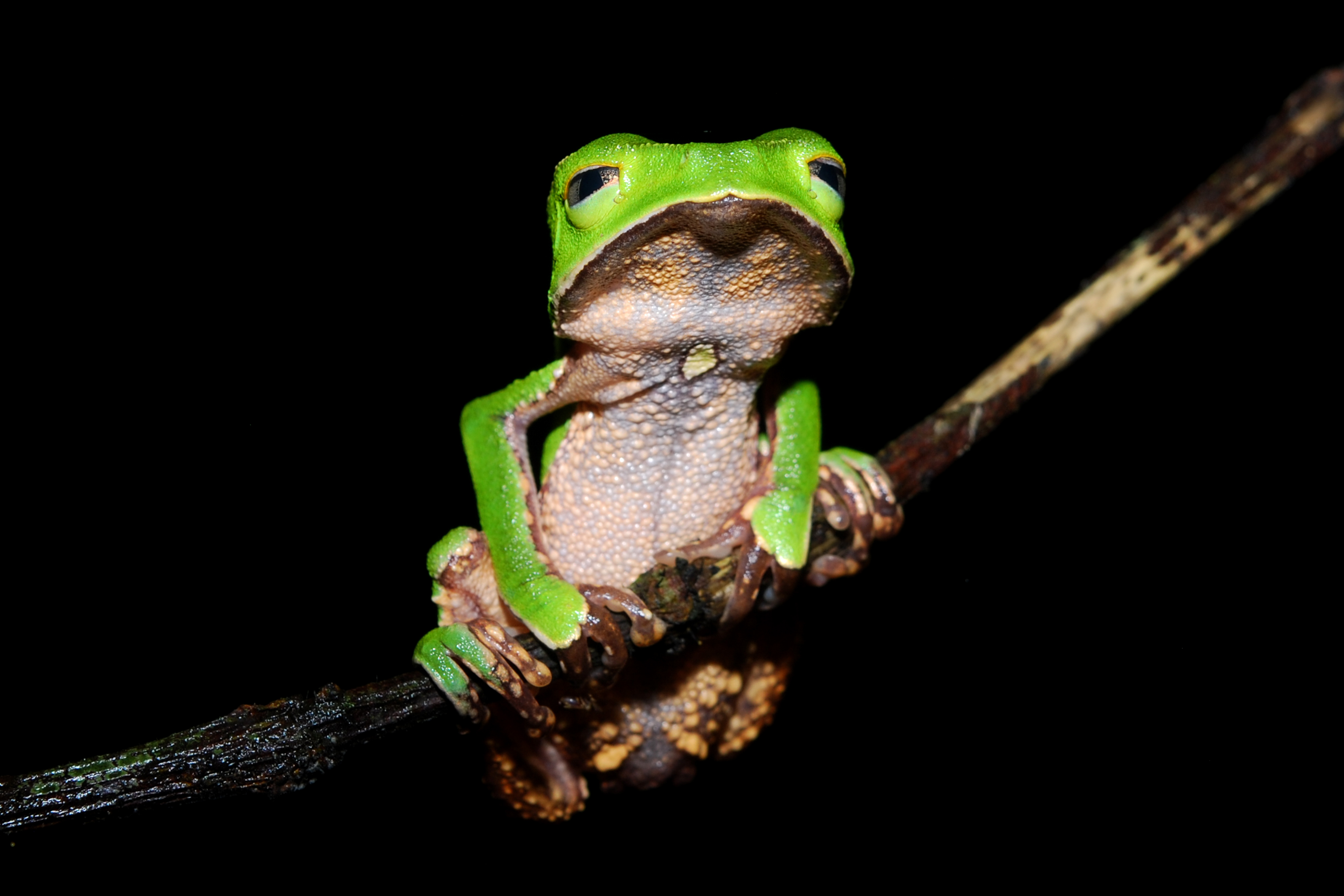
Yasuni National Park, Ecuador

The adult male frog measures 50.2 mm (1.98 in) to 57.5 mm (2.26 in) in snout-vent length and the adult female frog 68.8 mm (2.71 in) to 81.2 mm (3.20 in). Male and female frogs show notable sexual dimorphism in the shapes of their snouts.

The skin of the dorsum is mostly green with reddish-brown on the flanks and whitish or orange spots. This frog can have red, lavender, or orange color on the inner parts of its hind legs. The ventrum is light orange.

== Behaviour ==
This frog is arboreal and nocturnal in its habits. The female lays eggs during the rainiest part of the year. She builds a nest out of leaves hanging over a pond or other body of water. She lays the eggs in the nest with jelly over them to prevent desiccation. When the tadpoles hatch out of the eggs, they fall out of the nest into the water below. Sometimes the tadpoles breathe air during the day, but they do not do this at night.
