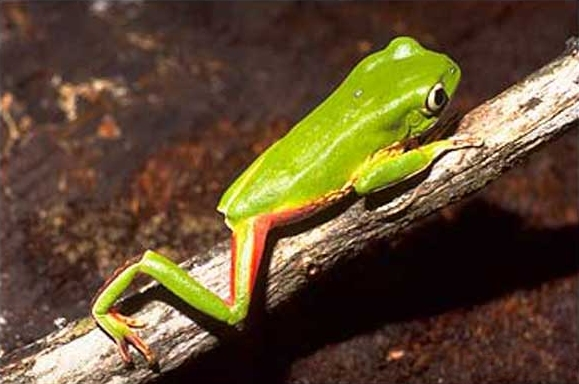

Conservation status
- Least Concern (IUCN 3.1)

Scientific classification
- Kingdom: Animalia
- Phylum: Chordata
- Class: Amphibia
- Order: Anura
- Family: Phyllomedusidae
- Genus: Phyllomedusa
- Species: P. distincta

Binomial name
- Phyllomedusa distincta B. Lutz, 1950

= Phyllomedusa distincta =

Species of frog

Phyllomedusa distincta is a species of frog in the subfamily Phyllomedusinae, endemic to Brazil. It has been observed as high as 1000 meters above sea level.

This frog has been found in primary forest and in secondary forest. People have seen it on shrubs near standing water. The female frog lays eggs on leaves overhanging permanent bodies of water. When the eggs hatch, the tadpoles fall into the water below.

Scientists do not believe that this frog is in danger of dying out because of its extensive range, but it is in decline. This is because of habitat loss associated with urbanization, small-scale agriculture, silviculture, and logging.
