= Species description =

Formal description of a discovered species

A species description is a formal scientific description of a newly encountered species, typically articulated through a scientific publication. Its purpose is to provide a clear description of a new species of organism and explain how it differs from species that have been previously described or related species. For a species to be considered valid, a species description must follow established guidelines and naming conventions dictated by relevant nomenclature codes. These include the International Code of Zoological Nomenclature (ICZN) for animals, the International Code of Nomenclature for algae, fungi, and plants (ICN) for plants, and the International Committee on Taxonomy of Viruses (ICTV) for viruses. A species description often includes photographs or other illustrations of type material and information regarding where this material is deposited. The publication in which the species is described gives the new species a formal scientific name. Some 1.9 million species have been identified and described, out of some 8.7 million that may actually exist. Additionally, over five billion species have gone extinct over the history of life on Earth.

== Naming process ==
A name of a new species becomes valid (available in zoological terminology) with the date of publication of its formal scientific description. Once the scientist has performed the necessary research to determine that the discovered organism represents a new species, the scientific results are summarized in a scientific manuscript, either as part of a book or as a paper to be submitted to a scientific journal.

A scientific species description must fulfill several formal criteria specified by the nomenclature codes, e.g. selection of at least one type specimen. These criteria are intended to ensure that the species name is clear and unambiguous, for example, the International Code of Zoological Nomenclature states that "Authors should exercise reasonable care and consideration in forming new names to ensure that they are chosen with their subsequent users in mind and that, as far as possible, they are appropriate, compact, euphonious, memorable, and do not cause offence."

Species names are written in the 26 letters of the Latin alphabet, but many species names are based on words from other languages, and are Latinized.

Once the manuscript has been accepted for publication, the new species name is officially created.

Once a species name has been assigned and approved, it can generally not be changed except in the case of error. For example, a species of beetle (Anophthalmus hitleri) was named by a German collector after Adolf Hitler in 1933 when he had recently become chancellor of Germany. It is not clear whether such a dedication would be considered acceptable or appropriate today, but the name remains in use.

Species names have been chosen on many different bases. The most common is a naming for the species' external appearance, its origin, or the species name is a dedication to a certain person. Examples would include a bat species named for the two stripes on its back (Saccopteryx bilineata), a frog named for its Bolivian origin (Phyllomedusa boliviana), and an ant species dedicated to the actor Harrison Ford (Pheidole harrisonfordi). A scientific name in honor of a person or persons is known as a taxonomic eponym or eponymic; patronym and matronym are the gendered terms for this.

A number of humorous species names also exist. Literary examples include the genus name Borogovia (an extinct dinosaur), which is named after the borogove, a mythical character from Lewis Carroll's poem "Jabberwocky". A second example, Macrocarpaea apparata (a tall plant) was named after the magical spell "to apparate" from the Harry Potter novels by J. K. Rowling, as it seemed to appear out of nowhere. In 1975, the British naturalist Sir Peter Scott proposed the binomial name Nessiteras rhombopteryx ("Ness monster with diamond-shaped fin") for the Loch Ness Monster; it was soon spotted that it was an anagram of "monster hoax by Sir Peter S".

=== Recognizing benefactors through species naming ===
Species have frequently been named by scientists in recognition of supporters and benefactors. For example, the genus Victoria (a flowering waterplant) was named in honour of Queen Victoria of Great Britain. More recently, a species of lemur (Avahi cleesei) was named after the actor John Cleese in recognition of his work to publicize the plight of lemurs in Madagascar.

Non-profit ecological organizations may also allow benefactors to name new species in exchange for financial support for taxonomic research and nature conservation. A German non-profit organisation, BIOPAT – Patrons for Biodiversity, has raised more than $450,000 for research and conservation through sponsorship of over 100 species using this model. An individual example of this system is the Plecturocebus aureipalatii (or "monkey of the Golden Palace"), which was named after the Golden Palace casino in recognition of a $650,000 contribution to the Madidi National Park in Bolivia in 2005.

The International Code of Nomenclature for algae, fungi, and plants discourages this practice somewhat: "Recommendation 20A. Authors forming generic names should comply with the following ... (h) Not dedicate genera to persons quite unconcerned with botany, mycology, phycology, or natural science in general."

== History ==
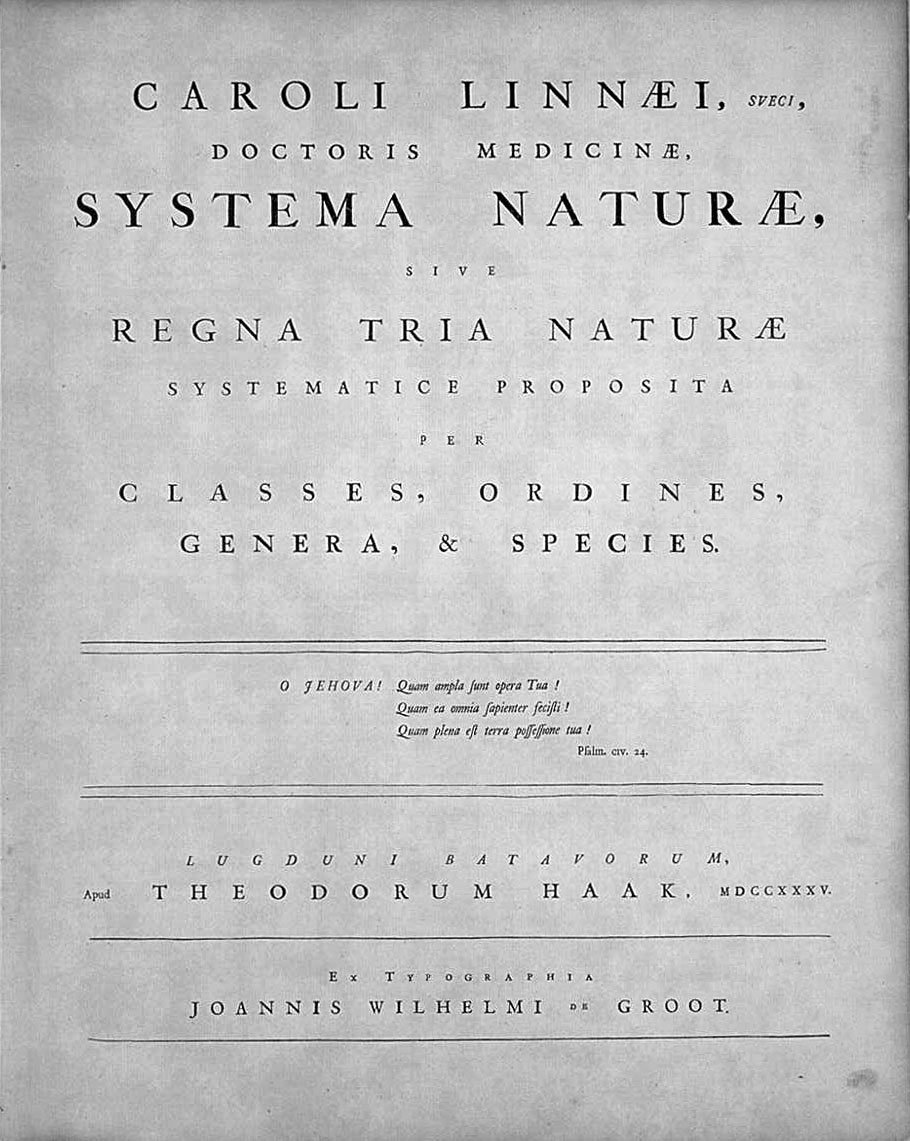
Original title page of Linnaeus's Systema Naturae, published in 1735

Early biologists often published entire volumes or multiple-volume works of descriptions in an attempt to catalog all known species. These catalogs typically featured extensive descriptions of each species and were often illustrated upon reprinting.

The first of these large catalogs was Aristotle's History of Animals, published around 343 BC. Aristotle included descriptions of creatures, mostly fish and invertebrates, in his homeland, and several mythological creatures rumored to live in far-away lands, such as the manticore.

In 77 AD Pliny the Elder dedicated several volumes of his Natural History to the description of all life forms he knew to exist. He appears to have read Aristotle's work since he writes about many of the same far-away mythological creatures.

Toward the end of the 12th century, Konungs skuggsjá, an Old Norse philosophical didactic work, featured several descriptions of the whales, seals, and monsters of the Icelandic seas. These descriptions were brief and often erroneous, and they included a description of the mermaid and a rare island-like sea monster called hafgufu. The author was hesitant to mention the beast (known today to be fictitious) for fear of its size, but felt it was important enough to be included in his descriptions.

However, the earliest recognized species authority is Carl Linnaeus, who standardized the modern taxonomy system beginning with his Systema Naturae in 1735.

As the catalog of known species was increasing rapidly, it became impractical to maintain a single work documenting every species. Publishing a paper documenting a single species was much faster and could be done by scientists with less broadened scopes of study. For example, a scientist who discovered a new species of insect would not need to understand plants, or frogs, or even insects which did not resemble the species, but would only need to understand closely related insects.

== Modern differences ==
Formal species descriptions today follow strict guidelines set forth by the codes of nomenclature. Very detailed formal descriptions are made by scientists, who usually study the organism closely for a considerable time. A diagnosis may be used instead of, or as well as the description. A diagnosis specifies the distinction between the new species and other species, and it does not necessarily have to be based on morphology. In recent times, new species descriptions have been made without voucher specimens, and this has been controversial.

== Statistics ==
Analysis of species databases has revealed that the annual rate of new species descriptions is currently at an all-time peak and increasing

| Year | Total new species descriptions | Animals | Plants | Fungi | Protists | Chromista | Bacteria | Archea | Cumulative species descriptions |
|---|---|---|---|---|---|---|---|---|---|
| 1920 | 9685 | 6693 | 2086 | 855 | 2 | 41 | 8 | 0 | 229280 |
| 1921 | 8915 | 6092 | 1866 | 836 | 12 | 103 | 6 | 0 | 232103 |
| 1922 | 11068 | 7698 | 2274 | 802 | 15 | 268 | 10 | 1 | 235473 |
| 1923 | 9910 | 6902 | 2246 | 577 | 6 | 161 | 18 | 0 | 238481 |
| 1924 | 11173 | 7914 | 2236 | 910 | 19 | 82 | 12 | 0 | 241740 |
| 1925 | 11094 | 8215 | 1995 | 785 | 9 | 83 | 7 | 0 | 244619 |
| 1926 | 11900 | 9054 | 1682 | 956 | 10 | 180 | 18 | 0 | 247465 |
| 1927 | 10957 | 8099 | 1891 | 790 | 8 | 158 | 11 | 0 | 250323 |
| 1928 | 11499 | 8367 | 2053 | 841 | 7 | 211 | 20 | 0 | 253455 |
| 1929 | 11144 | 7719 | 2574 | 511 | 28 | 303 | 9 | 0 | 256880 |
| 1930 | 10275 | 7612 | 1736 | 582 | 8 | 326 | 11 | 0 | 259543 |
| 1931 | 11286 | 7991 | 2093 | 895 | 11 | 290 | 4 | 2 | 262838 |
| 1932 | 11225 | 8085 | 2178 | 610 | 20 | 323 | 9 | 0 | 265978 |
| 1933 | 9811 | 7297 | 1725 | 537 | 2 | 236 | 14 | 0 | 268492 |
| 1934 | 11565 | 8047 | 2083 | 1276 | 4 | 136 | 19 | 0 | 272010 |
| 1935 | 11018 | 8267 | 1998 | 504 | 9 | 216 | 24 | 0 | 274761 |
| 1936 | 11553 | 8280 | 2608 | 534 | 12 | 108 | 10 | 1 | 278034 |
| 1937 | 10280 | 7558 | 2034 | 549 | 2 | 126 | 11 | 0 | 280756 |
| 1938 | 11554 | 9008 | 1795 | 626 | 1 | 116 | 8 | 0 | 283302 |
| 1939 | 10953 | 8152 | 1873 | 815 | 5 | 99 | 9 | 0 | 286103 |
| 1940 | 10027 | 7308 | 1948 | 597 | 5 | 154 | 14 | 1 | 288822 |
| 1941 | 8569 | 6307 | 1475 | 696 | 8 | 63 | 20 | 0 | 291084 |
| 1942 | 7373 | 5333 | 1607 | 372 | 4 | 47 | 10 | 0 | 293124 |
| 1943 | 6001 | 4400 | 1178 | 367 | 4 | 50 | 2 | 0 | 294725 |
| 1944 | 5305 | 3754 | 1086 | 383 | 0 | 68 | 14 | 0 | 296276 |
| 1945 | 4669 | 3324 | 765 | 525 | 2 | 49 | 4 | 0 | 297621 |
| 1946 | 4785 | 3471 | 777 | 479 | 14 | 37 | 7 | 0 | 298935 |
| 1947 | 5786 | 4048 | 847 | 800 | 4 | 78 | 7 | 2 | 300673 |
| 1948 | 6006 | 4137 | 1104 | 617 | 2 | 135 | 11 | 0 | 302542 |
| 1949 | 7091 | 5201 | 1370 | 446 | 3 | 63 | 8 | 0 | 304432 |
| 1950 | 8574 | 5742 | 1865 | 728 | 6 | 218 | 15 | 0 | 307264 |
| 1951 | 9093 | 6646 | 1532 | 735 | 4 | 162 | 13 | 1 | 309711 |
| 1952 | 9087 | 6880 | 1210 | 892 | 2 | 80 | 23 | 0 | 311918 |
| 1953 | 8962 | 6512 | 1566 | 772 | 2 | 81 | 29 | 0 | 314368 |
| 1954 | 9334 | 7083 | 1147 | 909 | 8 | 170 | 17 | 0 | 316619 |
| 1955 | 9793 | 7512 | 1255 | 907 | 9 | 79 | 31 | 0 | 318900 |
| 1956 | 9779 | 7923 | 1093 | 636 | 15 | 81 | 31 | 0 | 320756 |
| 1957 | 9470 | 7033 | 1357 | 824 | 16 | 150 | 90 | 0 | 323193 |
| 1958 | 9956 | 7636 | 1416 | 740 | 9 | 119 | 35 | 1 | 325513 |
| 1959 | 9742 | 7672 | 952 | 1020 | 8 | 60 | 30 | 0 | 327583 |
| 1960 | 10338 | 7963 | 1274 | 899 | 12 | 157 | 33 | 0 | 329958 |
| 1961 | 9943 | 7528 | 1319 | 903 | 23 | 135 | 35 | 0 | 332373 |
| 1962 | 10777 | 8709 | 1102 | 771 | 15 | 143 | 37 | 0 | 334441 |
| 1963 | 10094 | 7813 | 1308 | 835 | 10 | 80 | 48 | 0 | 336722 |
| 1964 | 11004 | 8517 | 1346 | 992 | 18 | 91 | 40 | 0 | 339209 |
| 1965 | 11709 | 9356 | 1369 | 805 | 15 | 122 | 42 | 0 | 341562 |
| 1966 | 10144 | 7698 | 1495 | 812 | 17 | 81 | 41 | 0 | 344008 |
| 1967 | 11106 | 8868 | 1321 | 787 | 30 | 70 | 30 | 0 | 346246 |
| 1968 | 12045 | 9654 | 1284 | 933 | 45 | 102 | 26 | 1 | 348637 |
| 1969 | 10149 | 7900 | 1287 | 811 | 17 | 86 | 48 | 0 | 350886 |
| 1970 | 10578 | 8458 | 1132 | 802 | 28 | 107 | 50 | 1 | 353006 |
| 1971 | 11133 | 8856 | 1108 | 1040 | 27 | 62 | 40 | 0 | 355283 |
| 1972 | 11784 | 8656 | 1807 | 1165 | 21 | 103 | 30 | 2 | 358411 |
| 1973 | 11130 | 8782 | 1287 | 907 | 18 | 102 | 34 | 0 | 360759 |
| 1974 | 11114 | 8721 | 1432 | 785 | 21 | 86 | 68 | 1 | 363152 |
| 1975 | 11051 | 8053 | 1379 | 1166 | 33 | 382 | 36 | 2 | 366150 |
| 1976 | 10270 | 7882 | 1449 | 798 | 34 | 71 | 36 | 0 | 368538 |
| 1977 | 13400 | 9029 | 1558 | 973 | 66 | 1752 | 21 | 1 | 372909 |
| 1978 | 11552 | 8540 | 2039 | 823 | 27 | 84 | 39 | 0 | 375921 |
| 1979 | 12789 | 9671 | 1839 | 1036 | 47 | 161 | 34 | 1 | 379039 |
| 1980 | 12353 | 8969 | 2275 | 961 | 30 | 90 | 26 | 2 | 382423 |
| 1981 | 13003 | 9634 | 1878 | 822 | 46 | 554 | 64 | 5 | 385792 |
| 1982 | 12255 | 9093 | 2173 | 840 | 20 | 55 | 71 | 3 | 388954 |
| 1983 | 13368 | 9983 | 2016 | 1129 | 49 | 82 | 100 | 9 | 392339 |
| 1984 | 12531 | 9531 | 1995 | 756 | 31 | 124 | 83 | 11 | 395339 |
| 1985 | 12272 | 9159 | 2041 | 852 | 24 | 88 | 102 | 6 | 398452 |
| 1986 | 13724 | 10326 | 2132 | 1003 | 48 | 111 | 92 | 12 | 401850 |
| 1987 | 13548 | 10175 | 2101 | 1091 | 29 | 78 | 72 | 2 | 405223 |
| 1988 | 13714 | 10277 | 2127 | 960 | 27 | 217 | 93 | 13 | 408660 |
| 1989 | 12970 | 9091 | 2192 | 1432 | 31 | 119 | 94 | 11 | 412539 |
| 1990 | 13350 | 10019 | 2167 | 915 | 55 | 94 | 90 | 10 | 415870 |
| 1991 | 13051 | 9729 | 2325 | 808 | 29 | 86 | 69 | 5 | 419192 |
| 1992 | 12970 | 10189 | 1859 | 745 | 27 | 67 | 81 | 2 | 421973 |
| 1993 | 13869 | 10608 | 2049 | 979 | 23 | 94 | 113 | 3 | 425234 |
| 1994 | 13614 | 10633 | 1731 | 969 | 26 | 162 | 88 | 5 | 428215 |
| 1995 | 13293 | 10027 | 2064 | 905 | 32 | 123 | 136 | 6 | 431481 |
| 1996 | 12729 | 9174 | 2237 | 1097 | 35 | 38 | 137 | 11 | 435036 |
| 1997 | 13026 | 9527 | 2065 | 1172 | 14 | 74 | 165 | 9 | 438535 |
| 1998 | 13749 | 10568 | 1994 | 949 | 27 | 39 | 154 | 18 | 441716 |
| 1999 | 13176 | 9659 | 2233 | 983 | 23 | 69 | 197 | 12 | 445233 |
| 2000 | 13301 | 10184 | 1653 | 1135 | 35 | 68 | 210 | 16 | 448350 |
| 2001 | 13544 | 9834 | 2146 | 1156 | 15 | 132 | 245 | 16 | 452060 |
| 2002 | 14307 | 10908 | 1838 | 1056 | 23 | 190 | 275 | 17 | 455459 |
| 2003 | 13611 | 10059 | 1904 | 1245 | 30 | 50 | 316 | 7 | 459011 |
| 2004 | 14820 | 11007 | 2035 | 1335 | 18 | 42 | 372 | 11 | 462824 |
| 2005 | 13353 | 9896 | 1966 | 908 | 29 | 72 | 466 | 16 | 466281 |
| 2006 | 14703 | 10850 | 2182 | 1063 | 21 | 48 | 524 | 15 | 470134 |
| 2007 | 15044 | 10786 | 2257 | 1343 | 22 | 53 | 558 | 25 | 474392 |
| 2008 | 15178 | 11110 | 2113 | 1317 | 22 | 57 | 542 | 17 | 478460 |
| 2009 | 15534 | 11126 | 2278 | 1437 | 23 | 52 | 607 | 11 | 482868 |
| 2010 | 15115 | 11123 | 2204 | 1140 | 27 | 46 | 554 | 21 | 486860 |
| 2011 | 15978 | 11905 | 2100 | 1327 | 19 | 44 | 559 | 24 | 490933 |
| 2012 | 15626 | 10852 | 2394 | 1699 | 25 | 38 | 606 | 12 | 495707 |
| 2013 | 15281 | 10290 | 2460 | 1645 | 26 | 36 | 799 | 25 | 500698 |
| 2014 | 15607 | 10505 | 2465 | 1810 | 26 | 22 | 738 | 41 | 505800 |
| 2015 | 16798 | 11056 | 2774 | 1967 | 16 | 35 | 912 | 38 | 511542 |
| 2016 | 16429 | 10098 | 2568 | 2722 | 18 | 42 | 959 | 22 | 517873 |
| 2017 | 16617 | 10571 | 2727 | 2551 | 11 | 47 | 696 | 14 | 523919 |
| 2018 | 15406 | 9910 | 2941 | 2452 | 26 | 29 | 48 | 0 | 529415 |
| 2019 | 13869 | 8952 | 2511 | 2333 | 24 | 18 | 30 | 1 | 534332 |
| 2020 | 17044 | 10936 | 2714 | 3127 | 9 | 16 | 242 | 0 | 540440 |

== See also ==
- Binomial nomenclature
- Biological type
- Botanical Latin
- Glossary of scientific naming
- Taxonomic treatment
- Undescribed taxon
- Category:Species described in the 21st century, with subcategories; contains links to earlier centuries

== Bibliography ==
- McNeill, J.; Barrie, F.R.; Buck, W.R.; Demoulin, V.; Greuter, W.; Hawksworth, D.L.; Herendeen, P.S.; Knapp, S.; Marhold, K.; Prado, J.; Prud'homme Van Reine, W.F.; Smith, G.F.; Wiersema, J.H.; Turland, N.J. (2012). International Code of Nomenclature for algae, fungi, and plants (Melbourne Code) adopted by the Eighteenth International Botanical Congress Melbourne, Australia, July 2011. Vol. Regnum Vegetabile 154. A.R.G. Gantner Verlag KG. ISBN 978-3-87429-425-6.

== Other sources ==
- Winston, Judith E. 1999. Describing Species: Practical Taxonomic Procedure For Biologists. Columbia University Press. ISBN 0-231-06824-7
