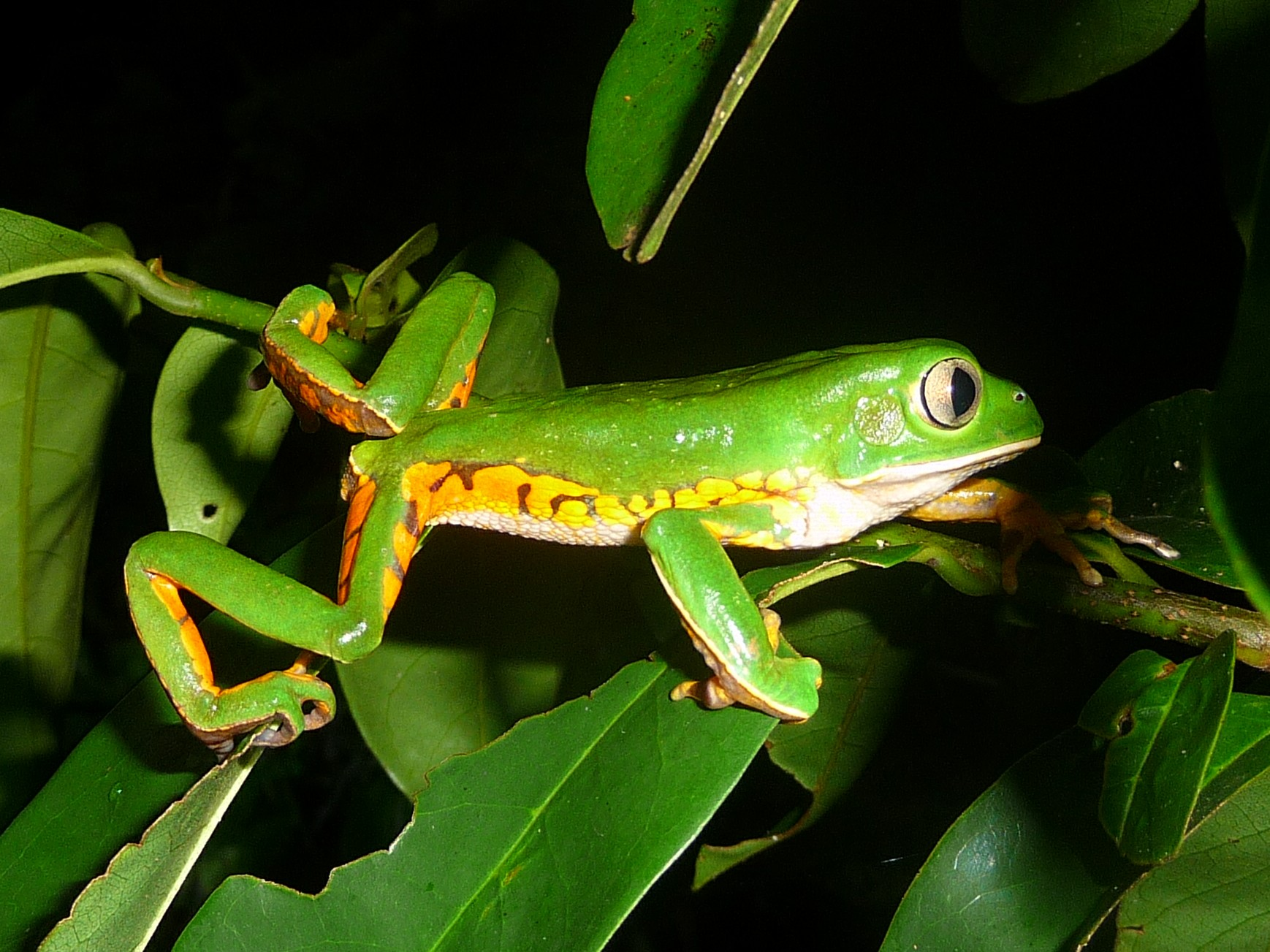

Conservation status
- Least Concern (IUCN 3.1)

Scientific classification
- Kingdom: Animalia
- Phylum: Chordata
- Class: Amphibia
- Order: Anura
- Family: Phyllomedusidae
- Genus: Phyllomedusa
- Species: P. tetraploidea

Binomial name
- Phyllomedusa tetraploidea Pombal and Haddad, 1992

= Phyllomedusa tetraploidea =

Species of frog

Phyllomedusa tetraploidea is a species of frog in the subfamily Phyllomedusinae. It is found in northern Argentina (Misiones Province), extreme southeastern Paraguay (Itapúa Department), and southern Brazil (São Paulo and Paraná states). It occurs in rainforest on herbaceous vegetation near swamps at elevations of 400–1,000 m (1,300–3,300 ft) above sea level. It also occurs in secondary forest and pastures. The eggs are deposited in leaf nests above the water in permanent forest pools; the tadpoles develop in the pools. It is a common species in Brazil and Argentina. Habitat loss caused by agricultural activities is a threat to it. It is present in several protected areas.
