= Chalco =

Chalco may refer to:

- Chalco de Díaz Covarrubias, or simply Chalco, seat of the municipality of Chalco, State of México
- Chalco (altépetl), an altépetl or pre-Columbian city-state in central Mexico
- Lake Chalco, endorheic lake formerly located in the Valley of Mexico
- Chalco, Nebraska in northern Sarpy County, Nebraska, United States
- Chalco Hills Recreation Area in Nebraska
- Valle de Chalco Solidaridad, a municipality located in State of Mexico, Mexico
- Chalco, Aluminum Corporation of China Limited
- The Chalco system in A. A. Attanasio's The Last Legends of Earth

== See also ==
- Calco
- Chaco (disambiguation)
- Chalcon
