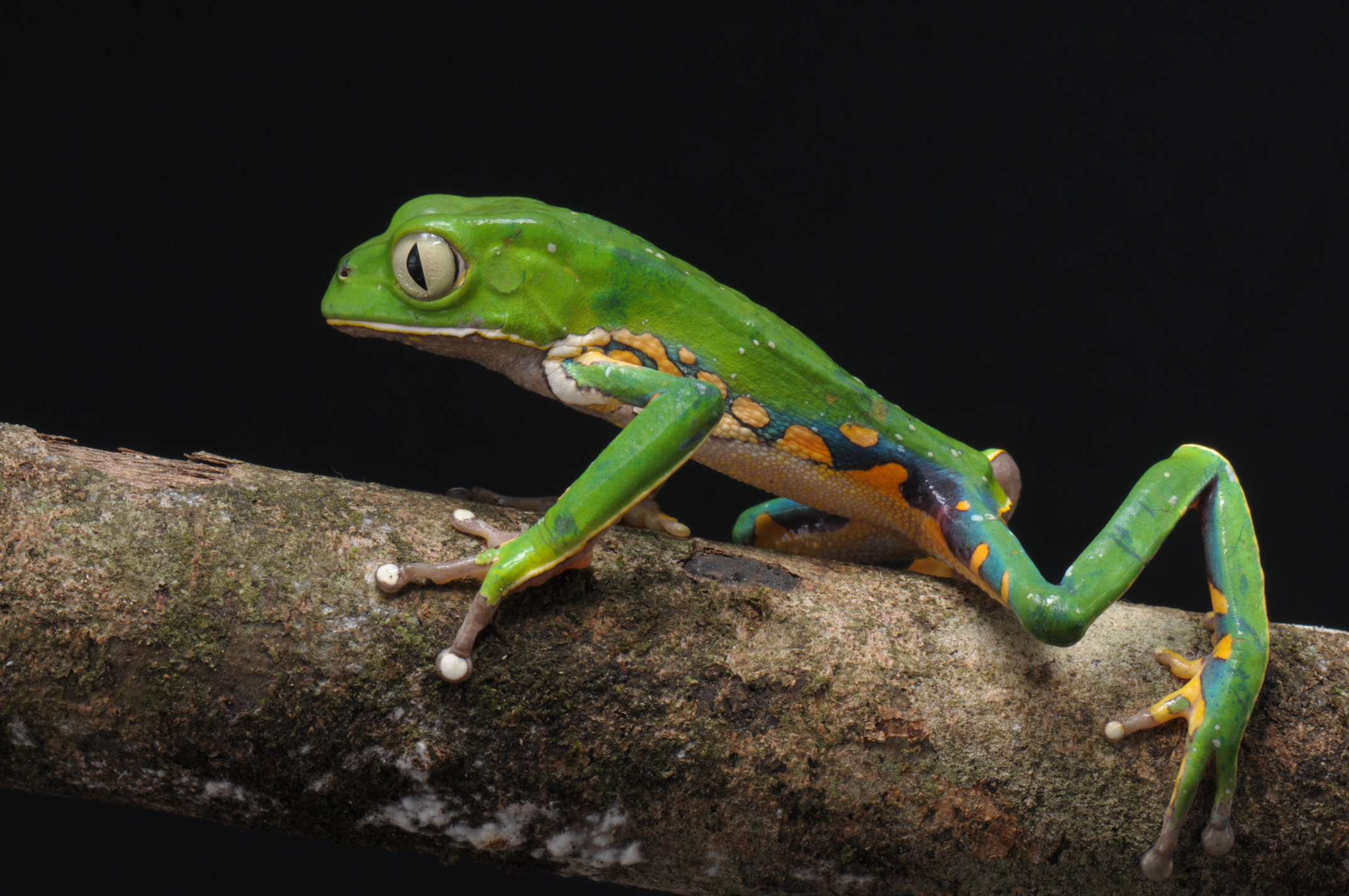

Conservation status
- Least Concern (IUCN 3.1)

Scientific classification
- Kingdom: Animalia
- Phylum: Chordata
- Class: Amphibia
- Order: Anura
- Family: Phyllomedusidae
- Genus: Phyllomedusa
- Species: P. bahiana

Binomial name
- Phyllomedusa bahiana Lutz, 1925

Synonyms
- Pithecopus bahiana (Lutz, 1925); Pithecopus burmeisteri bahiana (Lutz, 1925); Phyllomedusa burmeisteri bahiana Lutz, 1925

= Phyllomedusa bahiana =

Species of frog in the family Hylidae endemic to Bahia and Brazil

Phyllomedusa bahiana is a species of frog in the family Hylidae endemic to Bahia and Brazil. Scientists have seen it in mountain habitats, between 280 and 1000 meters above sea level.

This frog has been observed in forests near permanent bodies of water. The female frog lays eggs on overhanging leaves. When the eggs hatch, the tadpoles fall into the water below.

Scientists classify this frog as not in danger of dying out due to its large range, though there is some local threat from fire and other forest-destroying factors. The frog's range includes protected parks.
