= Phyllomedusa coelestis =

Conservation status
- Least Concern (IUCN 3.1)

Scientific classification
- Kingdom: Animalia
- Phylum: Chordata
- Class: Amphibia
- Order: Anura
- Family: Hylidae
- Genus: Phyllomedusa
- Species: P. coelestis

Binomial name
- Phyllomedusa coelestis (Cope, 1874)

Species of frog

Phyllomedusa coelestis is a species of frog in the subfamily Phyllomedusinae. It is found in Colombia, Ecuador, and Peru between 200 and 1000 meters above sea level.

This frog measures 53.3 to 64.8 mm in snout-vent length. This frog is green in color with some white and orange spots. Its belly is orange. There are small disks on its toes for climbing.

This frog is nocturnal and generally not found near ponds. Most of the frogs scientists have seen were in secondary forest with streams and dense undergrowth. Scientists have observed the female frog lay eggs in a folded leaf hanging over the water.

This frog is classified as least concern of extinction because of its large range.
