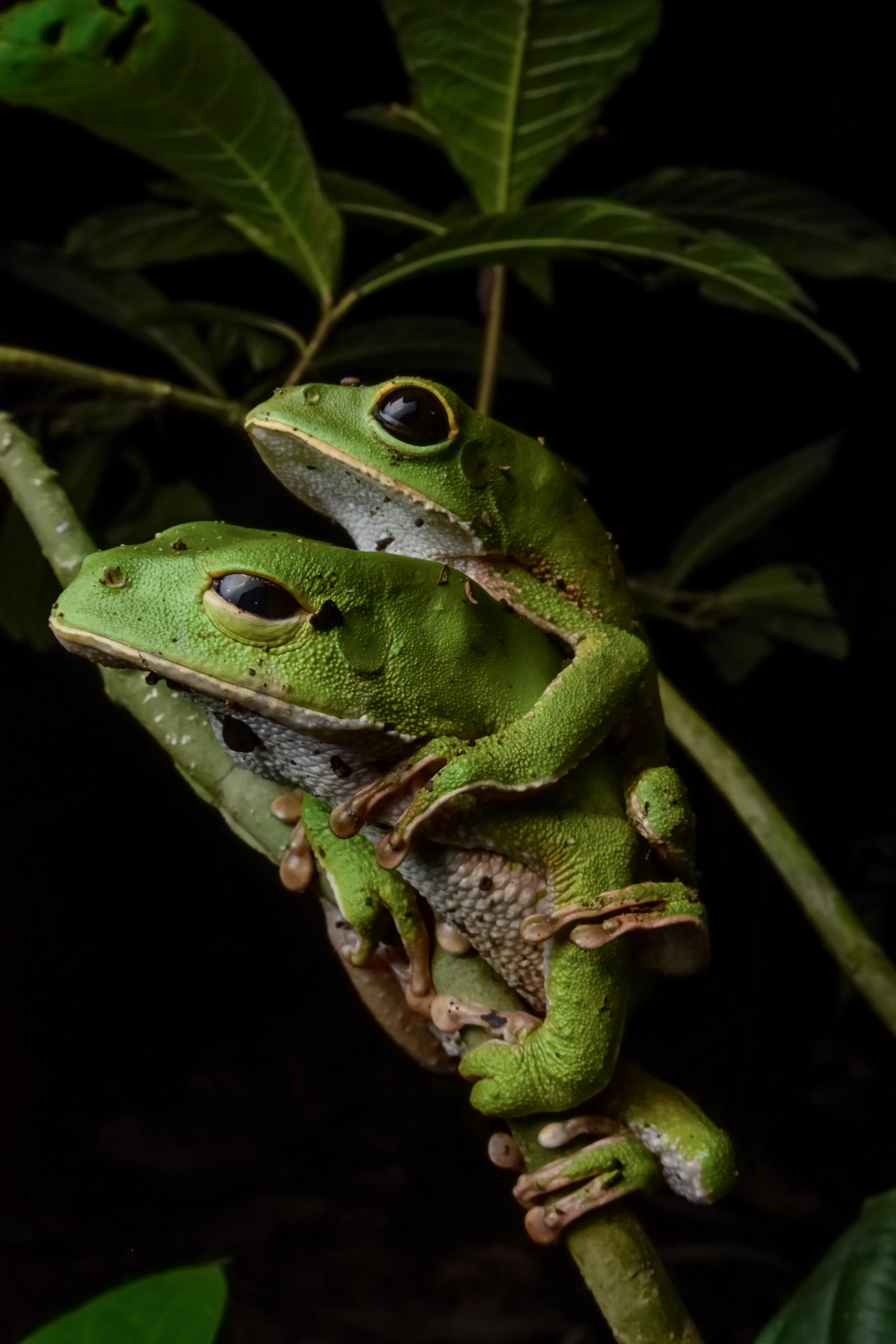

Conservation status
- Least Concern (IUCN 3.1)

Scientific classification
- Kingdom: Animalia
- Phylum: Chordata
- Class: Amphibia
- Order: Anura
- Family: Phyllomedusidae
- Genus: Phyllomedusa
- Species: P. camba

Binomial name
- Phyllomedusa camba De la Riva, 2000

= Phyllomedusa camba =

Species of frog

Phyllomedusa camba or the black-eyed monkey frog is a species of frog in the subfamily Phyllomedusinae. It is found in Bolivia, Brazil, and Peru. It has been observed between 280 and 1000 meters above sea level.

The adult frog measures 60.8 mm (2.39 in) to 69.6 mm (2.74 in) in snout-vent length. It has disks on its toes for climbing. The skin of the dorsum is green with yellow marks around its eyes. It has pink-white spots on its flanks and white spots on the inner surfaces of its legs. Parts of its legs and middle are purple.

This frog is nocturnal. The frogs have been observed in primary forest and in secondary forest. When it is time to lay eggs, the frogs leave the forest and go to a swamp if they can. The female frog makes a nest out of foam on a leaf. When the eggs hatch, they fall into the water below.

Scientists say this frog is not endangered because of its large range and because of its at least partial tolerance to altered habitats.

The scientific name of this frog, "camba," comes from the indigenous people who live in Bolivia.
