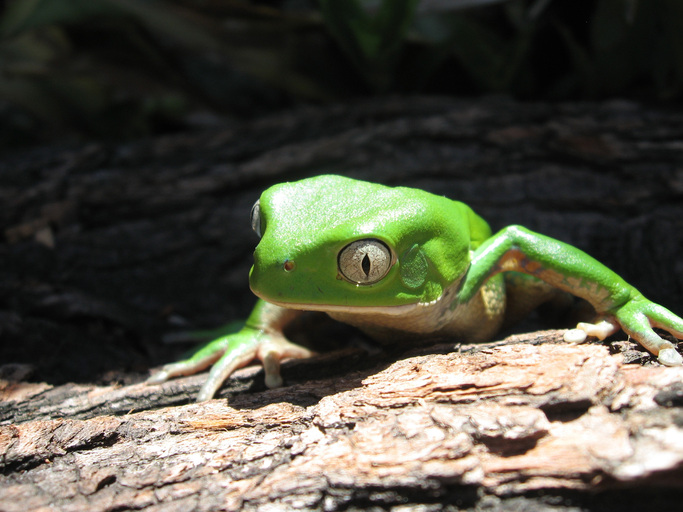

Conservation status
- Least Concern (IUCN 3.1)

Scientific classification
- Kingdom: Animalia
- Phylum: Chordata
- Class: Amphibia
- Order: Anura
- Family: Hylidae
- Genus: Phyllomedusa
- Species: P. iheringii

Binomial name
- Phyllomedusa iheringii Boulenger, 1885

Synonyms
- Phyllomedusa burmeisteri iheringii Boulenger, 1885; Pithecopus burmeisteri iheringii (Boulenger, 1885); Pithecopus iheringii (Boulenger, 1885)

= Phyllomedusa iheringii =

Species of frog

Phyllomedusa iheringii is a species of frog in the subfamily Phyllomedusinae. It is found in southernmost Brazil (Rio Grande do Sul) and Uruguay. The specific name iheringii honors Hermann von Ihering, a German-Brazilian zoologist. However, common name southern walking leaf frog has been proposed for it.

Phyllomedusa iheringii occurs in shrubland at elevations less than 500 m (1,600 ft). It is arboreal. The eggs are laid on vegetation above standing water where the tadpoles develop. Phyllomedusa iheringii is common in parts of its range. It might be threatened by pet trade and habitat loss through conversion of native habitat to pastures. It might be present in the Lagoa do Peixe National Park (Brazil).
