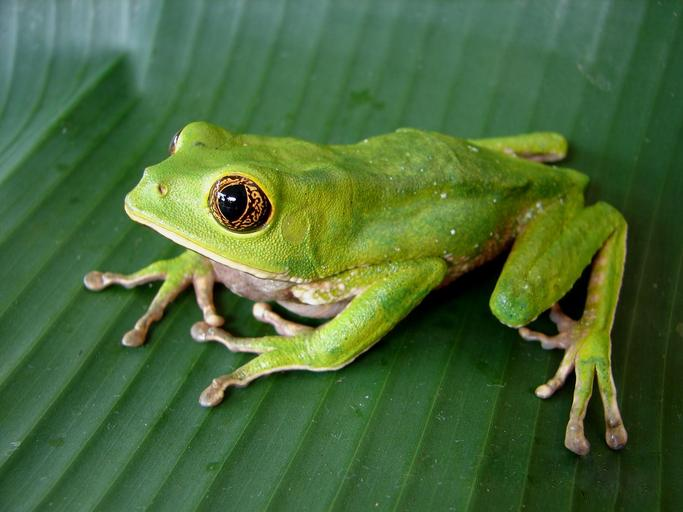

Conservation status
- Least Concern (IUCN 3.1)

Scientific classification
- Kingdom: Animalia
- Phylum: Chordata
- Class: Amphibia
- Order: Anura
- Family: Phyllomedusidae
- Genus: Phyllomedusa
- Species: P. venusta

Binomial name
- Phyllomedusa venusta Duellman & Trueb, 1967

= Phyllomedusa venusta =

Species of frog

Phyllomedusa venusta is a species of frog in the subfamily Phyllomedusinae, found in Colombia and Panama. Scientists have seen it between 800 and 1400 meters above sea level.

This frog is arboreal and has been observed perched on vegetation in humid and dry forests and occasionally in degraded habitats. This frog lays eggs in swamps and ponds. This frog is classified as least concern because of its large range, tolerance to habitat change, and presumed large population.
