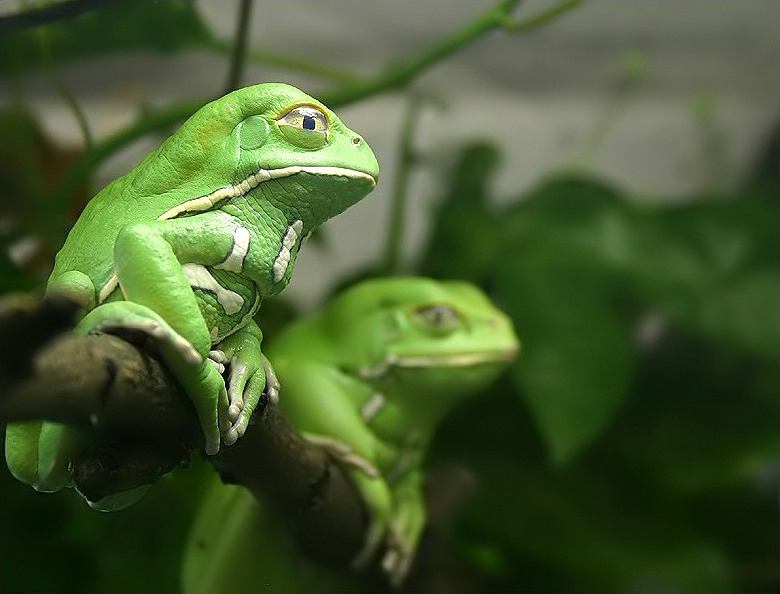
- Waxy monkey leaf frog (Phyllomedusa sauvagii)

Scientific classification
- Kingdom: Animalia
- Phylum: Chordata
- Class: Amphibia
- Order: Anura
- Family: Phyllomedusidae
- Genus: Phyllomedusa; Wagler, 1830

Species
- See text

= Phyllomedusa =

Genus of amphibians

Phyllomedusa is a genus of tree frogs in the subfamily Phyllomedusinae found in tropical and subtropical South America (south to northern Argentina) and Panama. It has 16 recognised species.

== Taxonomy ==
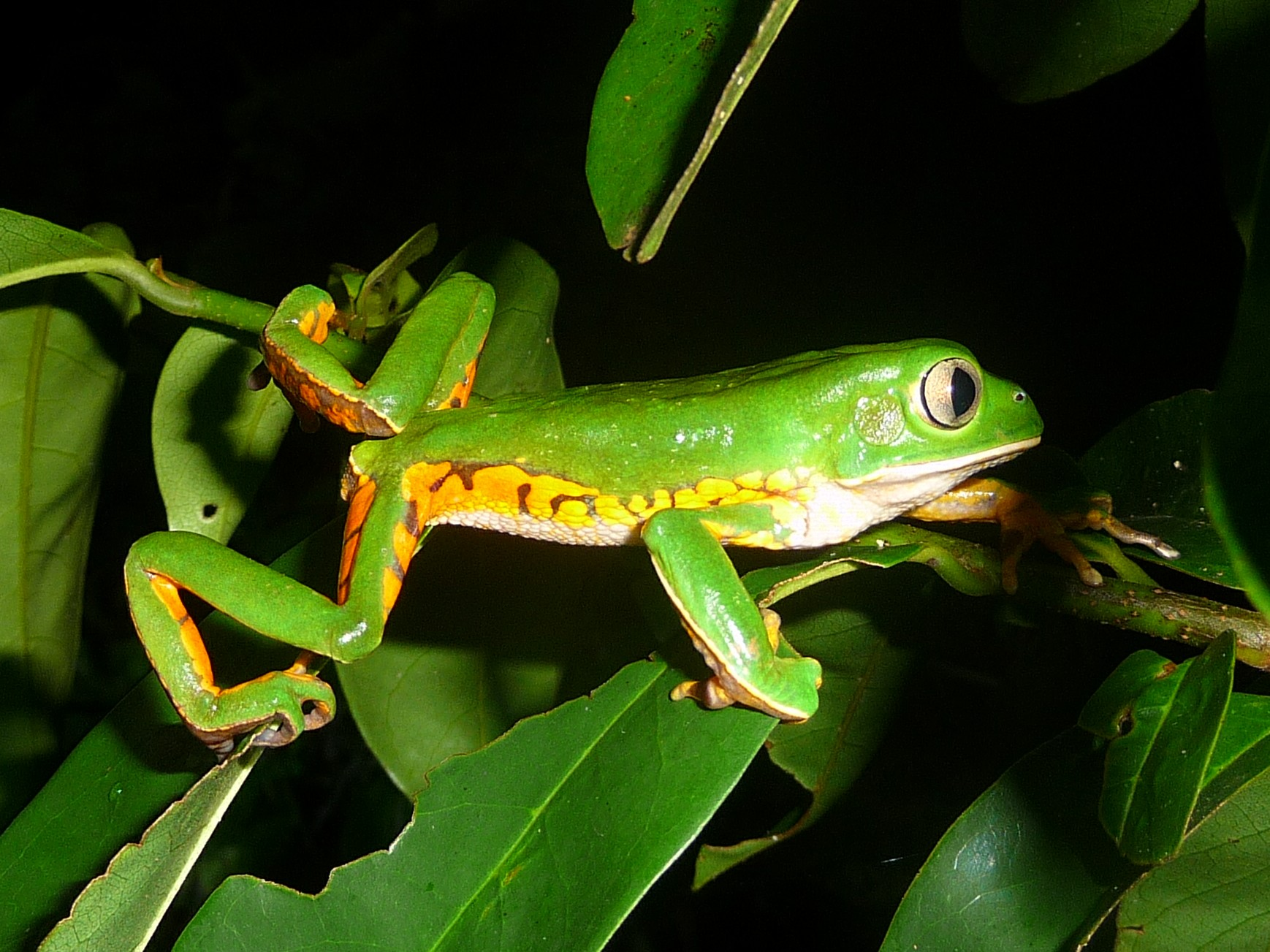
Phyllomedusa tetraploidea

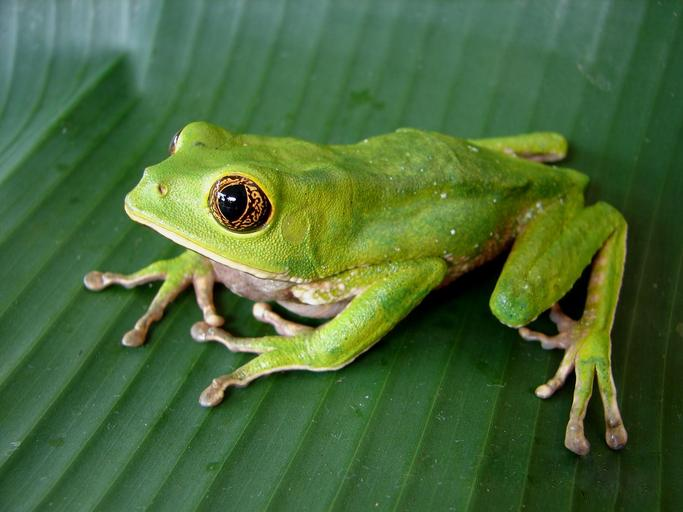
Phyllomedusa venusta

The following species are recognised in the genus Phyllomedusa:

- Phyllomedusa bahiana
- Phyllomedusa bicolor - giant leaf frog
- Phyllomedusa boliviana
- Phyllomedusa burmeisteri - Burmeister's leaf frog
- Phyllomedusa camba
- Phyllomedusa chaparroi
- Phyllomedusa coelestis
- Phyllomedusa distincta
- Phyllomedusa iheringii
- Phyllomedusa neildi
- Phyllomedusa sauvagii - waxy monkey leaf frog
- Phyllomedusa tarsius- tarsier leaf frog
- Phyllomedusa tetraploidea
- Phyllomedusa trinitatis
- Phyllomedusa vaillantii - white-lined leaf frog
- Phyllomedusa venusta

Several other species formerly included in this genus are now placed in two other phyllomedusid genera: Callimedusa and Pithecopus.

== Ecology and behaviour ==
=== Secretions ===
Some species of the genus Phyllomedusa produce a waxy secretion that reduces the evaporative water loss of their bodies. If they begin to dry out, they move their limbs over their backs, where the secretory glands are, and spread the lipid secretion over their entire skin.

Some indigenous groups from South America use the secretions of Phyllomedusa bicolor, the giant leaf frog, in shamanic hunting practices and as a traditional medicine ritual known as Kambo cleanse. The substance intoxicates those who ingest it, and hunters believe it causes them to temporarily improve their sensorial capacities.

=== Reproduction ===
Species of the genus Phyllomedusa deposit their eggs on a leaf surface, interspersed with hydrating jelly capsules. During the mating process, the frogs fold the leaf around their batch of eggs using their limbs, with a jelly plug at the bottom of the folded leaf to prevent the eggs from falling out. At hatching, the jelly plug is liquified, and the tadpoles drop through the previously plugged hole. These nests are made above water, so the tadpoles drop into a suitable habitat, where they begin their lives as filter feeders.

== Captivity ==
The waxy monkey tree frog is known to be kept in captivity.
