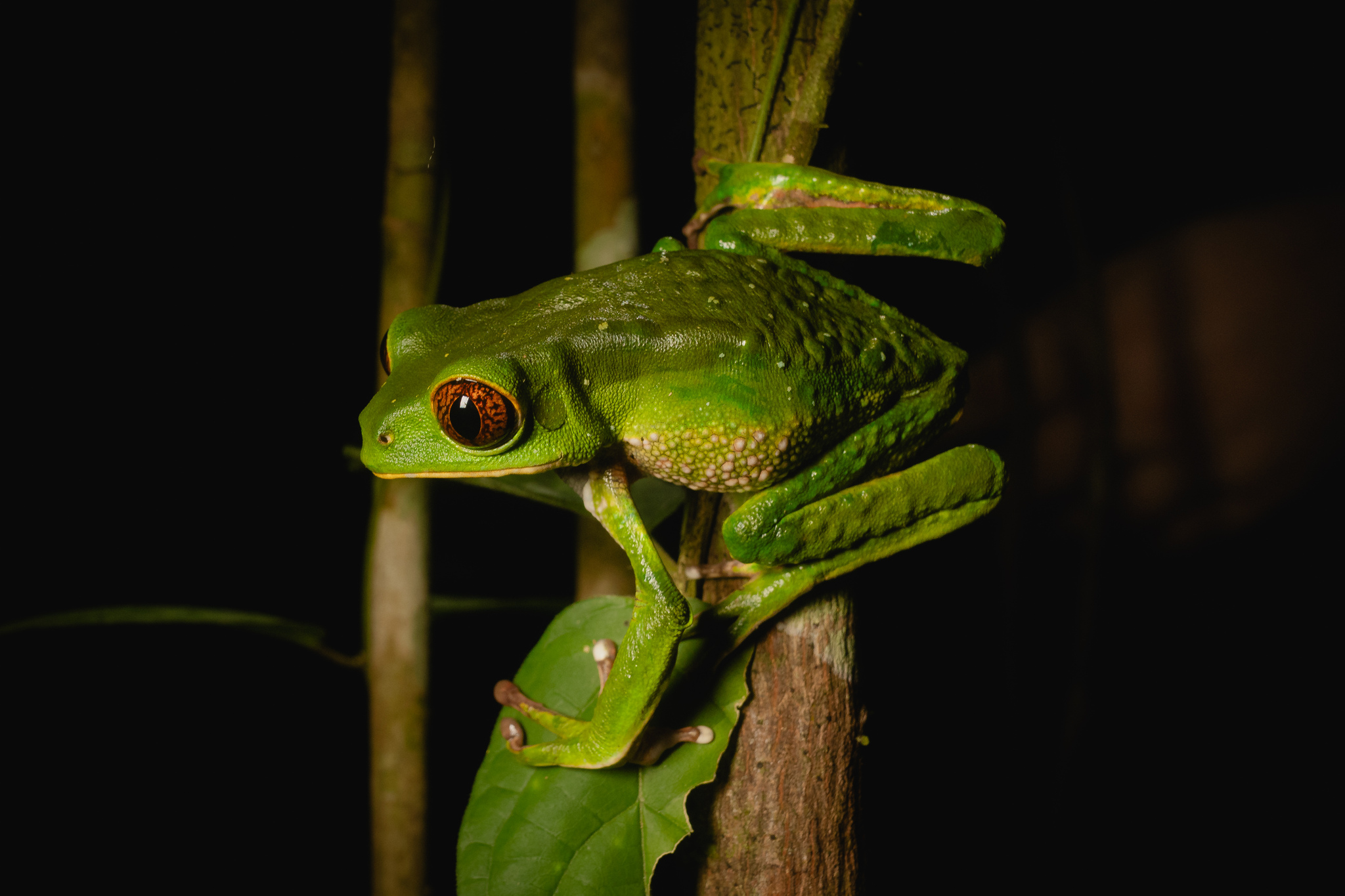

Conservation status
- Least Concern (IUCN 3.1)

Scientific classification
- Kingdom: Animalia
- Phylum: Chordata
- Class: Amphibia
- Order: Anura
- Family: Phyllomedusidae
- Genus: Phyllomedusa
- Species: P. tarsius

Binomial name
- Phyllomedusa tarsius (Cope, 1868)

= Phyllomedusa tarsius =

Species of amphibian

Phyllomedusa tarsius, the brownbelly leaf frog or tarsier leaf frog, is a species of frog in the subfamily Phyllomedusinae. It is found in Brazil, Colombia, Ecuador, Peru, and Venezuela, and possibly Bolivia and Guyana. This frog has been observed as high as 800 meters above sea level.

The adult male frog measures 82 mm (3.2 in) to 90 mm (3.5 in) in snout-vent length. The adult female frog measures 110 mm. The skin of the dorsum is green and some of the toes are brown and white. The belly is white and orange in color, and the throat is white. Their eyes are a mixture of orange, red, and black in color.

This frog is arboreal and nocturnal. Male frogs perch on tall plants near ponds and sing for females. The females lay 200–500 eggs per clutch in nests that they form out of leaves overhanging ponds. The female puts a jellylike substance on the eggs to prevent desiccation. When the tadpoles hatch, they fall out of the nest into the water below.

Scientists list this frog as least concern of extinction despite the considerable habitat degradation that has taken place in its range, which includes deforestation, overgrazing, and agriculture. However, the frog has shown such an ability to survive in altered habitats that the presumed population is quite large.
