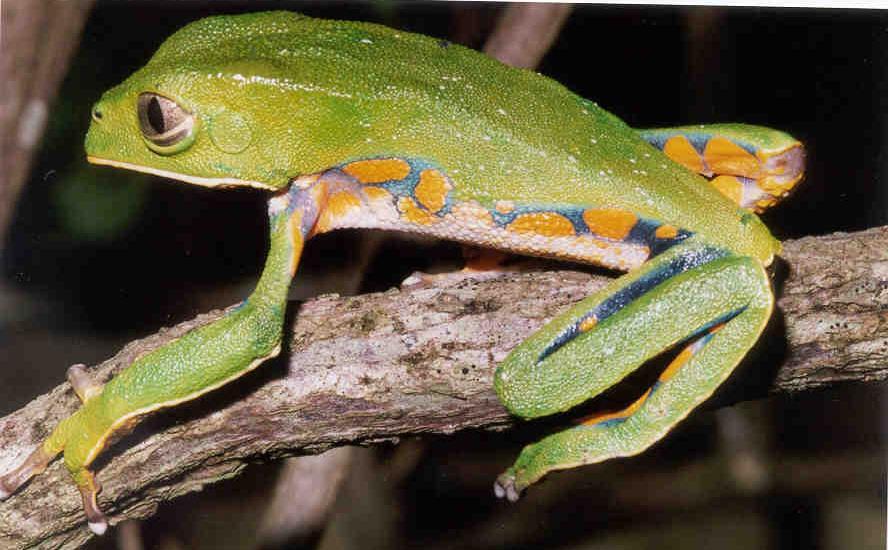

Conservation status
- Least Concern (IUCN 3.1)

Scientific classification
- Kingdom: Animalia
- Phylum: Chordata
- Class: Amphibia
- Order: Anura
- Family: Phyllomedusidae
- Genus: Phyllomedusa
- Species: P. burmeisteri

Binomial name
- Phyllomedusa burmeisteri Boulenger, 1882

= Phyllomedusa burmeisteri =

Species of amphibian

Phyllomedusa burmeisteri, also known as Burmeister's leaf frog and common walking leaf frog, is a species of frog native to the Atlantic Forest biome in Brazil.

== Description ==
=== Sizes ===
Individuals show sexual dimorphism in size. Males have a mean body length (snout vent length) of (63.4 ± 4.5 mm), and females have a mean body length of (76.7 ± 3.2 mm)

=== Calls ===
Males use calls to communicate their location to others. They also act as warning signals to potential opponents. P. burmeisteri males communicate through acoustical calls, which are either short or long calls. Short calls last from 330 to 450 ms, whereas long calls last from 560 to 600 ms. The calls are usually projected in arrangements of 2 to 5 at a time and are regularly spaced. BUR-RJ males, however, do not produce long calls. Males also use calls to attract and find females to mate with. The sound that they emit changes based on which of these behaviors they are trying to accomplish. However, the call that signals where the frogs are in relation to one another is also used by females when they are choosing a mate.

Warning calls act as a threat display and will transition from a short call to a long call, which is based on the number of pulses per call. If the opponent gets closer or begins to act in an aggressive manner towards a male, the male's calls will increase in length and number of pulses, and will become more rapid. The male will try to ward off competitors by using calls, as this method is less risky compared to engaging in physical combat. Males will become more violent if a potential intruder or competitor, which is usually another male, does not retreat. In the case that the calls are ignored and the male chooses to engage in physical fight, the male will either chase or wrestle their opponent.

== Distribution and habitat ==
There are two branches or evolutionary units of the P. burmeisteri species. These two branches are represented as BUR and BUR-RJ. Individuals of the BUR-RJ unit are typically found near the Serra do Mar mountain range in Rio de Janeiro, while the BUR unit can be found around in different locations in South America. The BUR unit of P. burmeisteri are usually found around still fresh water and near clearings and forest borders. They are prominent in South America and specifically Brazil. Within Brazil, they are more highly concentrated in Bahia, Espírito Santo, Minas Gerais, Rio de Janeiro, and São Paulo, which are all states in Brazil. The BUR unit of P. burmeisteri is more commonly found in Espírito Santo, Minas Gerais, Rio de Janeiro, and São Paulo. The reason the BUR-RJ unit is so limited is because its range is cut off by the Paraíba do Sul River. Geographical element such as rivers or mountain ranges are known to limit the range and expansion of species to a particular area.

== Behavior ==
=== Calling sites ===
P. burmeisteri also communicate through visual behaviors. The males will use a calling site when they perform mating or threat calls. They typically choose to utilize tree branches high in the air that have very few leaves or vegetation. One theory for why they make their calls on high barren branches is that it allows for a clear visual field making communication with other frogs easier. If they can see each other more easily, they will more efficiently be able to communicate and understand one another. Another possible explanation is that it encourages territory defense and also makes searching for a mate easier. Another benefit is that they are better able to defend their territory if they can see potential competitors and threats early on. Being able to see others is crucial to P. burmeisteri because they rely heavily on visual communication. One reason a visual form of communication is important is because they live in noisy environments, and therefore can not always rely on sound. The frogs also have contrasting color patterns on their legs that allow for them to be easily spotted by others.

== Mating and reproduction ==
Visual communication is utilized when it comes to mating. Males and females will slowly stretch and unstretch their patterned legs as part of a visual mating display. This can be described as a kind of peddling movement. Males then increase their call rate (in pulses per call) in response to this leg stretching, allowing the females to more rapidly locate a mate. The male and female leaf frogs mate along a leaf and leave clusters of eggs wrapped up in leaves.

=== Tadpoles ===
Tadpoles usually have a width of 46.80 mm. Tadpoles have a narrow body and a trapezoidal shape. The width of their body is about one third of their body length. Phyllomedusa tadpoles are usually a dull green color with dark spots around the dorsal region in the shape of stripes. They are also active during both the day and the night, usually staying stationary in their pond for the majority of the time. However, when they are startled, they will flee to a deeper part of the body of water and hide in any available crevices or rocks.

=== Parental Care ===
Eggless capsules surround the eggs and protect the eggs from all sides. The female P. burmeisteri usually remains with the eggs in her created nest to protect them, and the male frog leaves. The eggless capsules and leaves that surround the egg clusters prevent desiccation and drying of the eggs. At this time, the eggs need moisture while they develop. Rain is common in this tropical environment and it keeps the eggs' environment humid while they grow.

=== Hunting strategies ===
P. burmeisteri engage in a behavior known as pedal luring. Pedal luring is a strategy used by many frog species to capture prey. They typically start their hunt by latching onto something and waiting still and patiently for prey to come by. Once prey is near the frog, the frog will face towards the insect and start to move its fourth and fifth toes in a pedaling back and forth manner. The pedaling typically lasts for about 5 seconds, and becomes faster as the prey gets closer to the frog. The underside of the toes have white colored disks, which are bright and easily seen against the green contrasts of its surroundings. The white dots catch and help attract the attention of the prey, luring them in. After the prey is lured in close enough, the frog lunges out quickly and captures it using tongue protraction. These white dots are hidden on the under side of the frog during the day when they are not hunting. This is typical of many organisms, as they hide their coloration during the day when not in use.

=== Diet ===
P. burmeisteri feed mostly on orthropterans, cockroaches, spiders, and crickets. Since these organisms live on the ground, their diet suggests that they do most of their feeding and hunting on the ground, or near the rainforest floor.

== Conservation ==
Many frog species struggle with deforestation, as they rely on the humid environment of the rainforest. Oftentimes after the land is cleared, the species will disappear from the area. Deforestation in Brazil has led to a rapid decrease in species richness; however, P. burmeisteri appear to be somewhat resistant to deforestation, due to their ability to easily adapt to new environments.

== Contributions towards science ==
Insulin is a hormone that is responsible for regulating energy metabolism and maintaining proper levels of glucose and lipid homeostasis in the body. The lack or inability of insulin secretion leads to hyperglycemia, dyslipidemia, and diabetes. Type 2 diabetes mellitus (T2DM) has become a major health threat across the planet. Peptides from frog skin, specifically Phylloseptin peptides, have been found to induce insulinotropic activities. The peptide Phylloseptin-PBu can be isolated from P. burmeisteri and showed dose-dependent insulinotropic properties in rat pancreatic beta BRIN BD11 cells. It is able to catalyze insulin release by deactivating Potassium ATP channels, leading Phylloseptin-PBu peptide is able to act as a potent antidiabetic with a low cytotoxicity risk, proving valuable to potentially treating T2DM. Phylloseptin-like peptides have also been to have antimicrobial, antibacterial, and anti-fungal activities. These peptides achieve such activity by disruption of the cell membrane.

There is also some investigation into other Phyllomedusa species for biosynthesis of anti-microbial natural products. Their venomous secretions are made up of complex peptide combinations unique to each species and environmental threats, and can yield a high diversity and potentially wide range of new therapeutics that can be applied to other organisms or even human health.
