= Tourism in Paraguay =

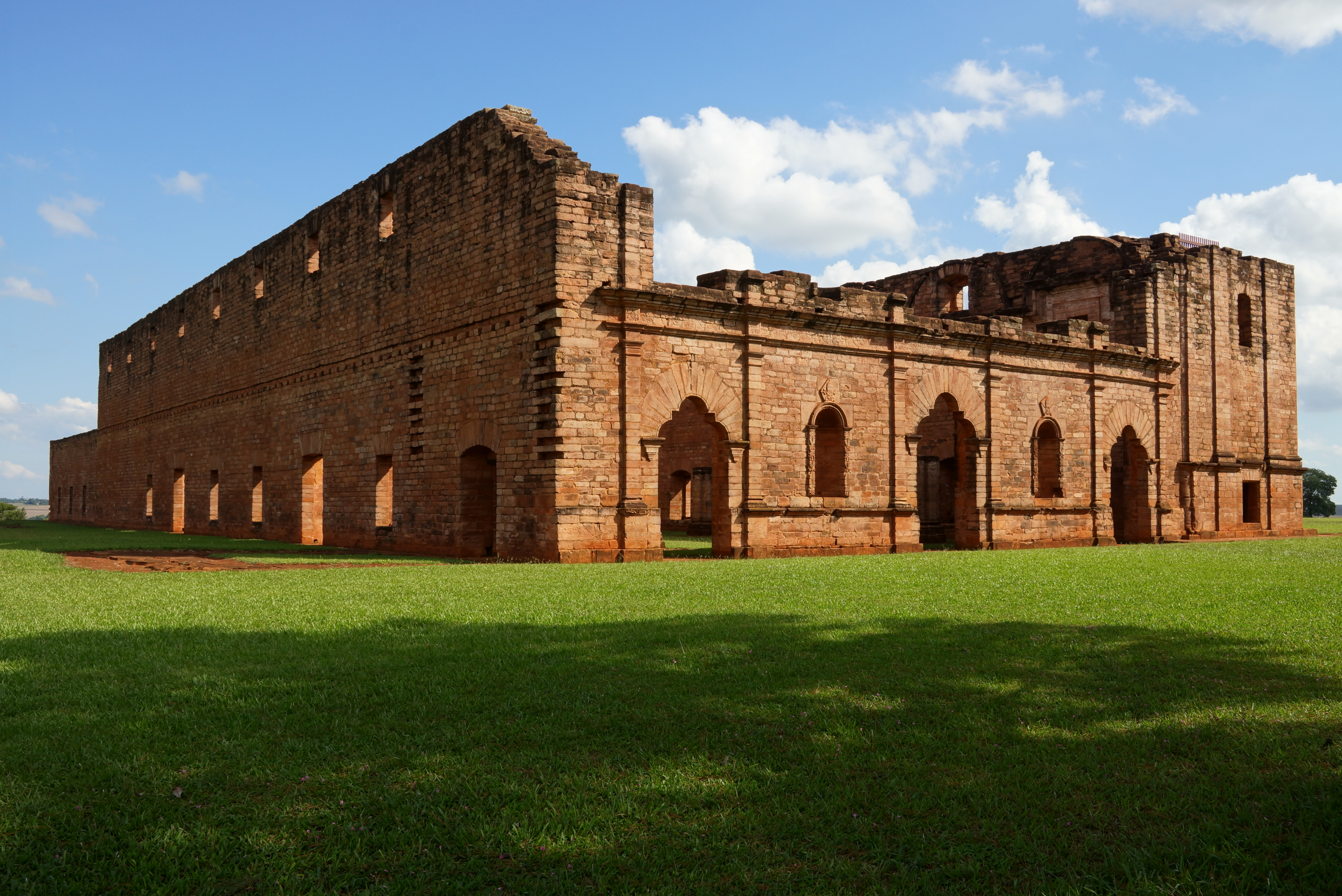
Jesuit Reductions of Jesús de Tavarangüe

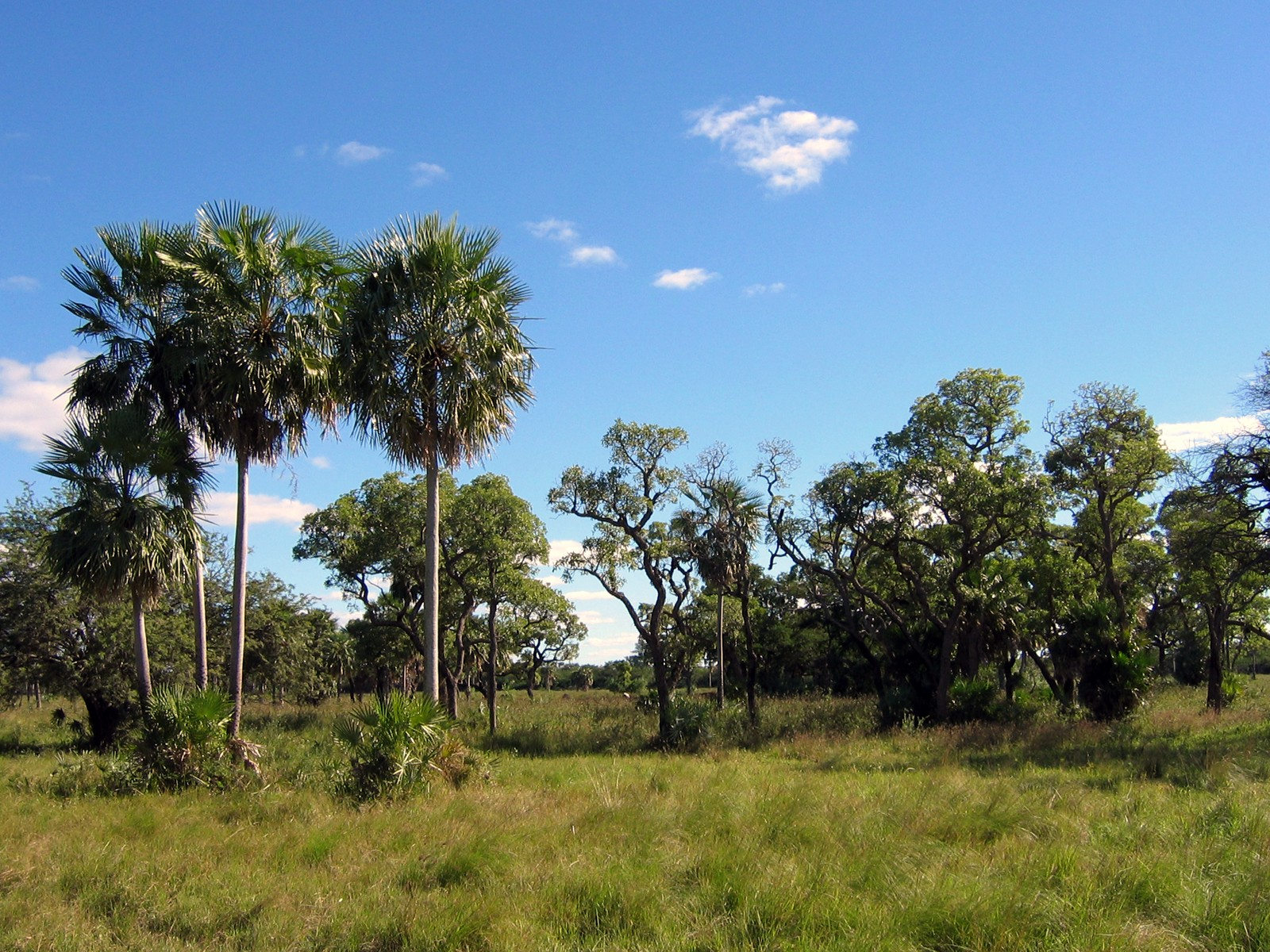
Chaco Boreal in Paraguay

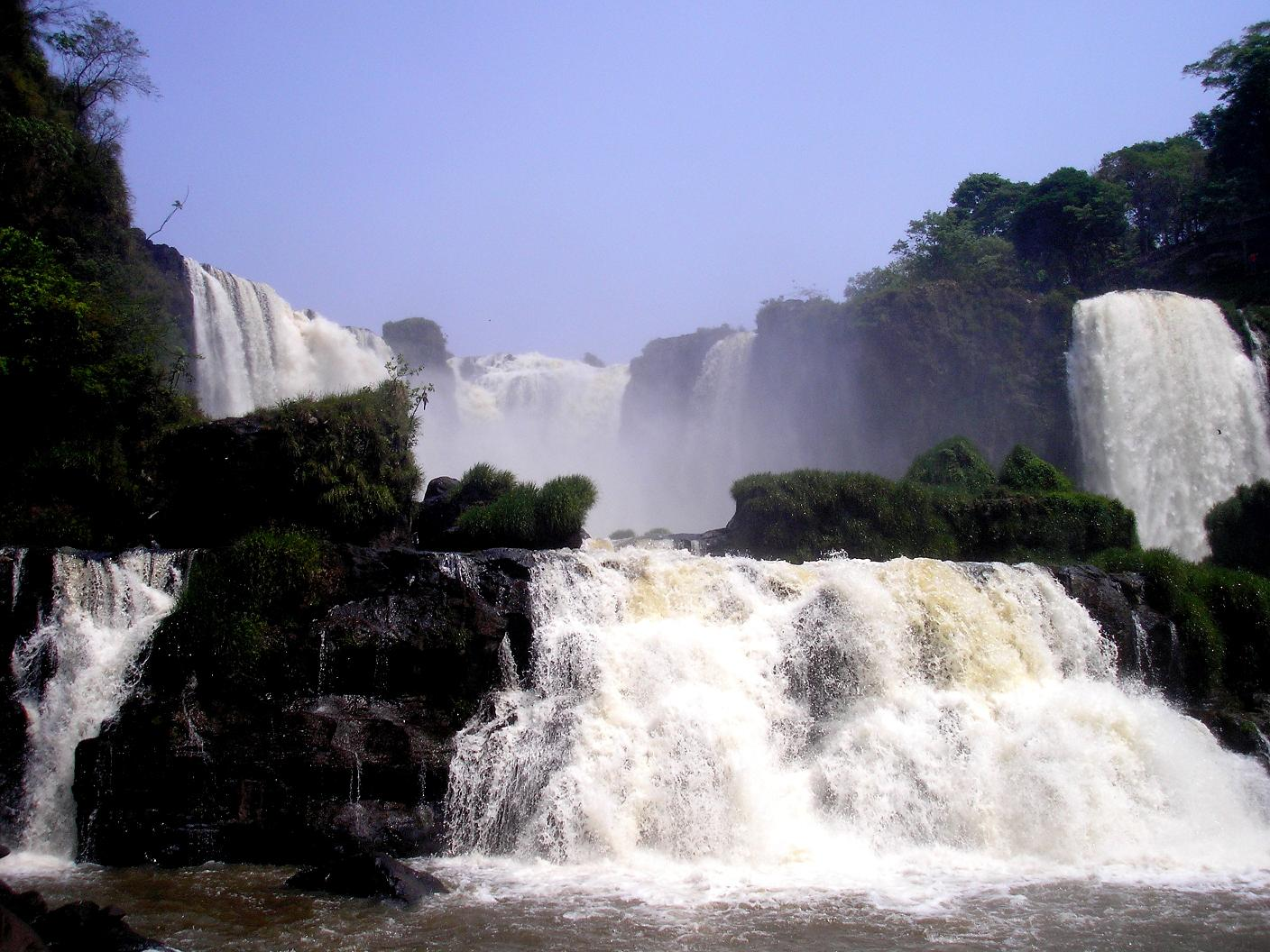
Del Monday falls

Tourism in Paraguay employs only 9,500 people, according to data from 2010.

Paraguay was the least visited country of South America after Guyana and Suriname, with only 610,000 international tourists for the period 2013–2014.

== Foreign tourism ==
Tourist arrivals of 2023 in %

The count of foreign tourists in 2022 were 1,548,401, divided into 579,471 tourists and 968,930 excursions. This is an increase from over a decade ago in 2011 were the number of visitors entered was 520,926, while in 2010 it was of 465,264. In 2015, the number of foreign tourists exceeded 1.2 million.

=== Arrivals by country ===
Most visitors arriving to Paraguay were divided into tourists and excursions in 2022. The top visits were from the following nations:

Rank	Country	Number	%
1	Argentina	440,044	75.94
2	Brazil	54,426	9.39
3	United States	12,280	2.12
4	Germany	9,651	1.67
4	Bolivia	9,408	1.62
5	Uruguay	8,419	1.45
6	Spain	7,853	1.36
7	Chile	5,719	0.99
8	Colombia	5,660	0.98
10	Peru	3,684	0.64
-	Other countries	22,327	3.85
Total (tourism)		579,471	100.0
International excursions		968,930	-
Grand total		1,548,401	100.0

== Tourist assets ==
=== Natural areas ===
There are numerous places that feature adventure tourism in Paraguay. Several of them have extreme sports like zip-lining and rappelling. Activities include walks, hiking in sulky, cavalcades, and guided tours. One can also perform educational scientific research in various reserves, such as observing the characteristic fauna and flora of rural areas. Paraguay's protected areas are found throughout the territory.

Rural tourism provides insight into the native culture of the peoples of Amazonian origin and highlights their maternal relationship to the land. Rural tourism in Paraguay (while largely devoted to relaxation) includes activities such as horseback riding, swimming, boating and hiking. Areas with great biodiversity are especially popular with tourists. Many large estancias (ranches) are open to urban and foreign tourists.

=== Typical food ===
Typical meals like sopa paraguaya, asado al asador, homemade oven cooked chicken, sweets, and marmalade are an attraction for tourists. In rural areas, tourists can see crops of sugarcane, maize, cassava, snuff, coffee, peanut, rice, sorghum, tung, and spurge, as well as other fruits of the Paraguayan land, such as the avocado, mango, papaya, and pineapple.

== Sport fishing ==
Paraguay's most important water sources are the Paraná River, the Tebicuary River, and Paraguay River. It also has several lakes, estuaries, and small streams. Among the most prized species of fish are the Surubí, which is an important component of indigenous cuisine. Another important fish is the Dorado, which is famous for its acrobatic jumps.

One of the richest cities in the production of fish is Villa Florida, whose beaches oversee the Tebicuary River. In this city, the popular sport is fishing, and the cuisine feature several dishes made with fish, such as Pira Caldo.
