= Phyllomedusa neildi =

Conservation status
- Data Deficient (IUCN 3.1)

Scientific classification
- Kingdom: Animalia
- Phylum: Chordata
- Class: Amphibia
- Order: Anura
- Family: Hylidae
- Genus: Phyllomedusa
- Species: P. neildi

Binomial name
- Phyllomedusa neildi Barrio-Amorós, 2006

Species of amphibian

Phyllomedusa neildi is a species of frog in the family Hylidae endemic to Venezuela. Scientists know this frog solely from its type locality: Sierra de San Luís. This frog has been observed between 550 and 1150 meters above sea level.

This frog is distinguishable from other frogs in the genus Phyllomedusa by its small size, by the pink and white coloration on the hidden surfaces of the legs, and by its call.

This frog is nocturnal animals. It lives in forests with deciduous and mixed forests. The female frog lays 250–280 eggs per clutch, encases them in a jellylike substance, and draws one or two leaves around them.

This frog's conservation status is "data deficient," but the forests that make up its habitat are classified as "critically endangered." Human beings collect firewood and there has been deforestation for the sake of urbanization and agriculture and goat grazing.
