= Chaco =

Chaco may refer to:

== Places in South America ==
- Chaco Basin, spanning Argentina, Bolivia, and Paraguay
- Chaco Department, a historical department in Paraguay and proposed in Bolivia
- Chaco Province, a province in the northeastern part of Argentina
- Chaco National Park, a national park in Argentina
- Chaco (volcano), a volcano in Chile
- Chaco War, a war fought between Paraguay and Bolivia
- Gran Chaco, a region in South America historically divided into Chaco Austral, Chaco Central, and Chaco Boreal
- Gran Chaco people, several Native American tribes in Paraguay, Bolivia, Argentina, and Brazil
- Gran Chaco Province, a province in Tarija Department in Bolivia
- Humid Chaco, an ecoregion in South America

== Places in North America ==
- Chaco Culture National Historical Park, historical and archaeological site in New Mexico
- Chaco River, intermittent river in New Mexico
- Chaco Wash, intermittent stream in New Mexico

== Other uses ==
- Chaco (footwear), a brand of sandals and other footwear
- Chaco (spider), an endemic spider genus in the family Nemesiidae
- Chaco golden knee, Grammostola pulchripes, an endemic species of tarantula spider
- Chaco (album), a 1995 album by Illya Kuryaki and the Valderramas
- Chaco (film), a 2020 Bolivian film
- Qaqun, a Palestinian Arab village depopulated in 1948
- Timeline of Chacoan history describing the history of Native Americans that once lived in northwest New Mexico and adjascant portions of Arizona and Colorado
- Christian Giménez (footballer, born 1981), Argentine-Mexican footballer and manager who goes by that as a nickname
