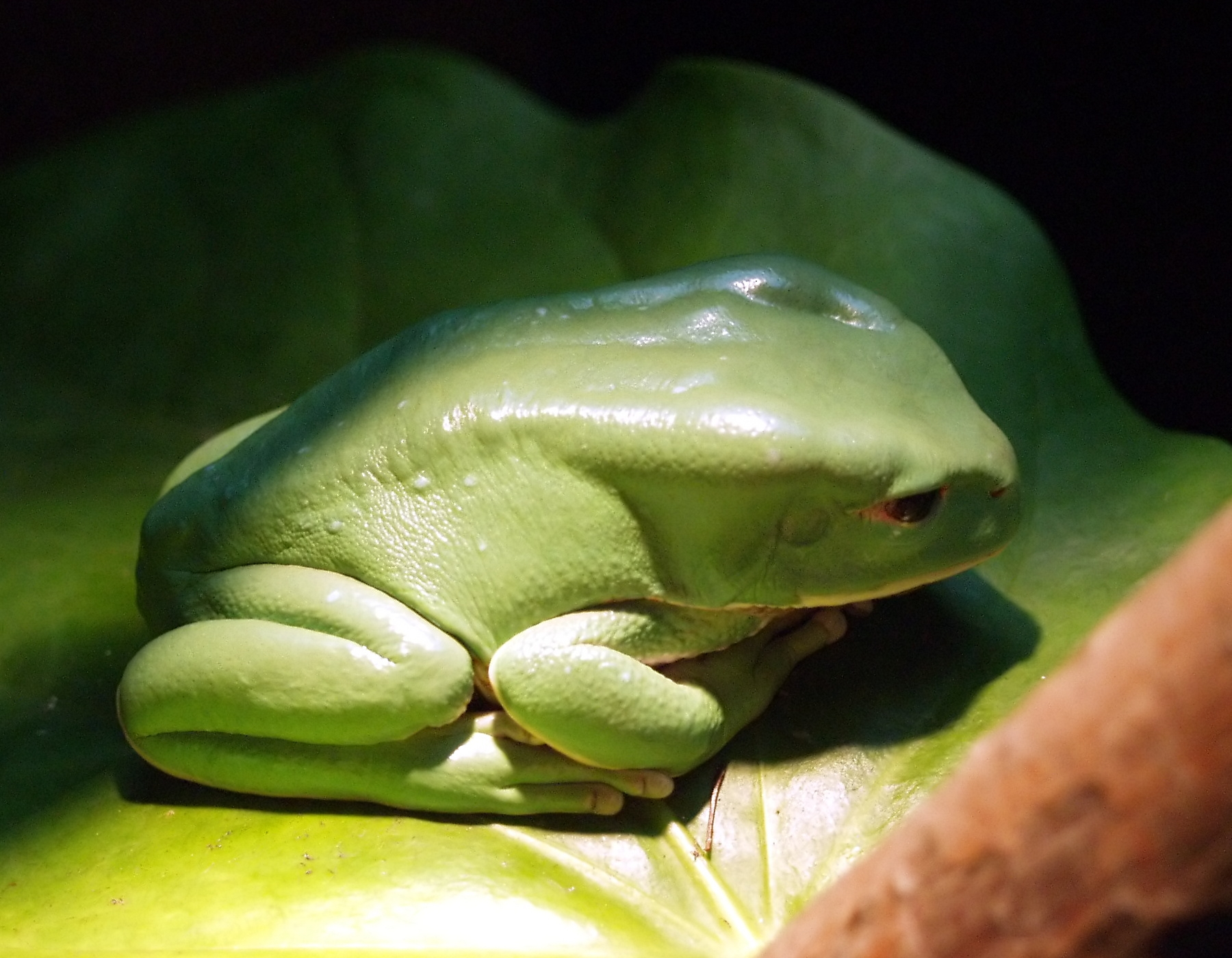

Conservation status
- Least Concern (IUCN 3.1)

Scientific classification
- Kingdom: Animalia
- Phylum: Chordata
- Class: Amphibia
- Order: Anura
- Family: Hylidae
- Genus: Phyllomedusa
- Species: P. boliviana

Binomial name
- Phyllomedusa boliviana Boulenger, 1902.

= Phyllomedusa boliviana =

Species of frog

Phyllomedusa boliviana is a species of frog in the subfamily Phyllomedusinae. It is found in Argentina, Bolivia, and Brazil (west of Mato Grosso and Rondônia States). It has been observed between 200 and 1,800 metres (660 and 5,910 ft) above sea level.

People have seen this frog on the dry slopes of the Andes Mountains, in forests and in the edges of forests. This frog has shown some tolerance to altered habitats, and it has been seen in human-made ponds, ditches, dams, and cows troughs.

The female frog builds a cone-shaped nest out of a leaf overhanging a temporary body of water. She lays her eggs in the cone. When the eggs hatch, the tadpoles fall into the water below.

Scientists say this frog is not in danger of extinction because of its large range, though there may be some localized threat from wood collection. Scientists think this might actually be more than one species.
