= Waxy-monkey treefrog =

Waxy-monkey treefrog is a common name for the following frog species:

- Phyllomedusa bicolor
- Phyllomedusa sauvagii
