= Chaco (volcano) =

Volcano in Chile

Coordinates: 25°27′S 69°02′W

Chaco is a volcano in Chile. It is part of the Central Volcanic Zone of Chile, which since the Miocene has generated large volcanic edifices. Chaco itself is 5,145 metres (16,880 ft) or 5,045 metres (16,552 ft) high and consists of two overlapping volcanic cones, which further have been cut by about three separate sector collapses. Lava flow features such as individual blocks and the flow front have been well preserved by the arid climate of the region. The sector collapses have given rise to avalanche deposits, the largest of which has a volume of about 2.45 cubic kilometres (0.59 cu mi). Later two of the sector collapses were found to be nonexistent, with one scarp being of glacial origin and another landslide deposit being a pyroclastic deposit.

Chaco has principally erupted andesite, which contains hornblende, orthopyroxene and plagioclase, but also biotite within lava dome forming andesites. Some hydrothermal alteration has taken place in the central part of the volcano. Radiometric dating has yielded ages of 17.0 - 15.5 million years ago.
