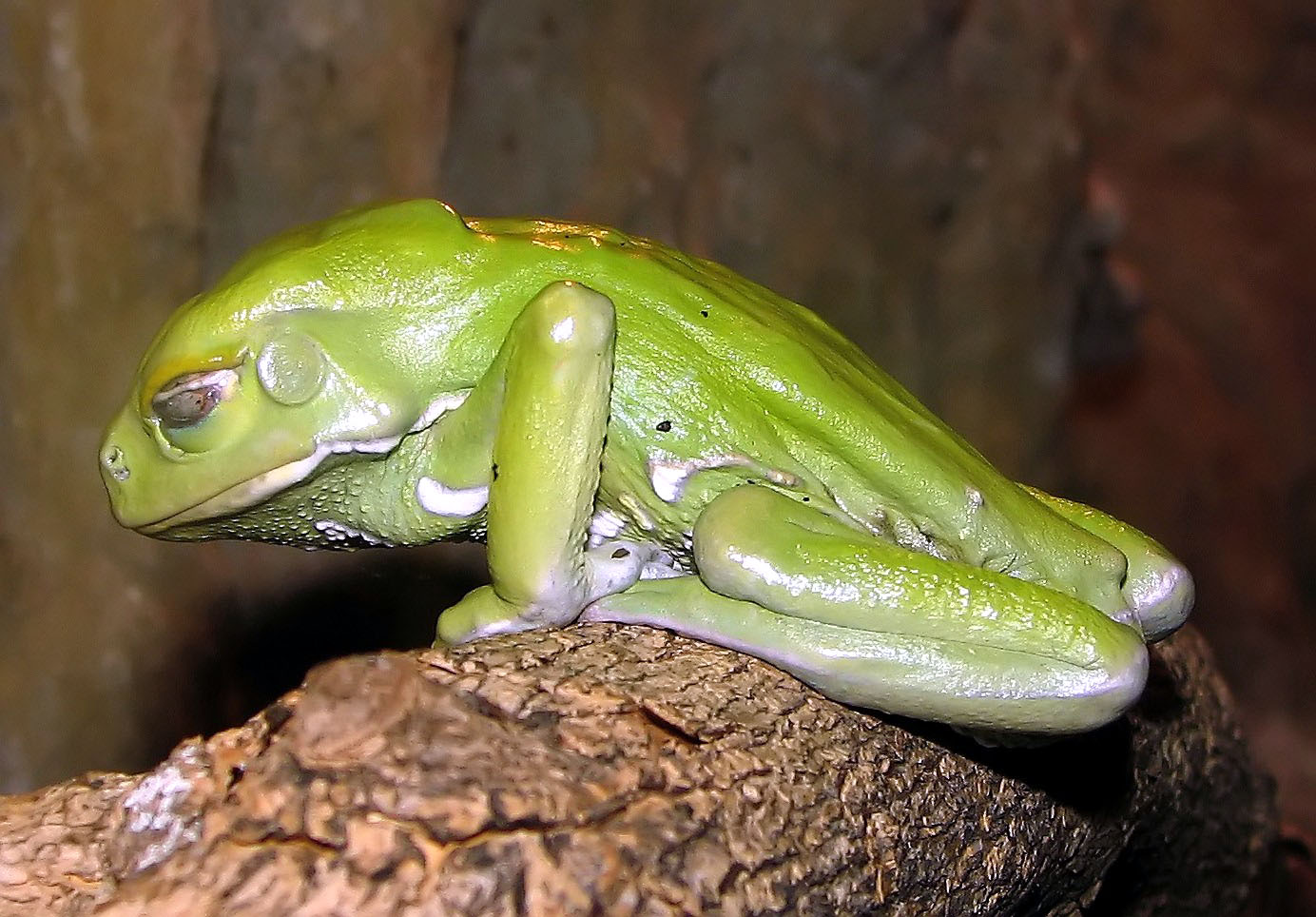

Conservation status
- Least Concern (IUCN 3.1)

Scientific classification
- Kingdom: Animalia
- Phylum: Chordata
- Class: Amphibia
- Order: Anura
- Family: Phyllomedusidae
- Genus: Phyllomedusa
- Species: P. sauvagii

Binomial name
- Phyllomedusa sauvagii Boulenger, 1882

= Phyllomedusa sauvagii =

Species of amphibian

Phyllomedusa sauvagii, the waxy monkey leaf frog or waxy monkey tree frog, is a species of frog in the subfamily Phyllomedusinae. It is native to South America, where it occurs in Paraguay, Argentina, Bolivia, and Brazil. This species is arboreal, living in the vegetation of the Gran Chaco.

== Reproduction and embryo development ==
The waxy monkey leaf frog breeds during the rainy season, which typically lasts from October until March. Mating does not occur continuously throughout the season, only during or shortly after periods of heavy rainfall. Males will find a shrub or tree near or in a body of water where they will begin to vocalize to attract females. They are amplectant maters and, as such, breeding pairs create their nest of eggs together. The pair will move towards their oviposition site, usually on a leaf overhanging a body of water, where the male will assist the female in laying her eggs while simultaneously fertilizing them.

A critical aspect of the reproductive success of waxy monkey leaf frogs is their oviposition site. Their eggs are highly permeable to water and will desiccate in nesting sites that are too arid or exposed to the sun. Its nest must also be on a leaf on a branch suspended over fresh water, so the hatching tadpoles drop into the water. They have been shown to non-randomly select sites in favor of larger leaf size and overhang of standing water. To avoid desiccation of eggs, females will lay empty gelatinous capsules in a manner so that they surround the real eggs. These capsules provide extra fluid for the development of embryos and help to keep the eggs from drying out. they also have adherent properties which assists the breeding pair in wrapping their nests with the leaf that they are laid on. Waxy monkey leaf frogs may also use more than one leaf to effectively wrap their clutch of eggs.

Eggs are large and yolk-heavy by anuran standards. Embryo development usually lasts between six and nine days, after which the embryos hatch spontaneously and drop into the water. Upon hatching, tadpoles are equipped with relatively large external gills, an oral disc with multiple lines of keratinized teeth, and a tail that composes about two thirds of their body length. Waxy monkey leaf frog embryos may exceed twenty millimeters in length upon hatching.

== Thermoregulation and water conservation ==
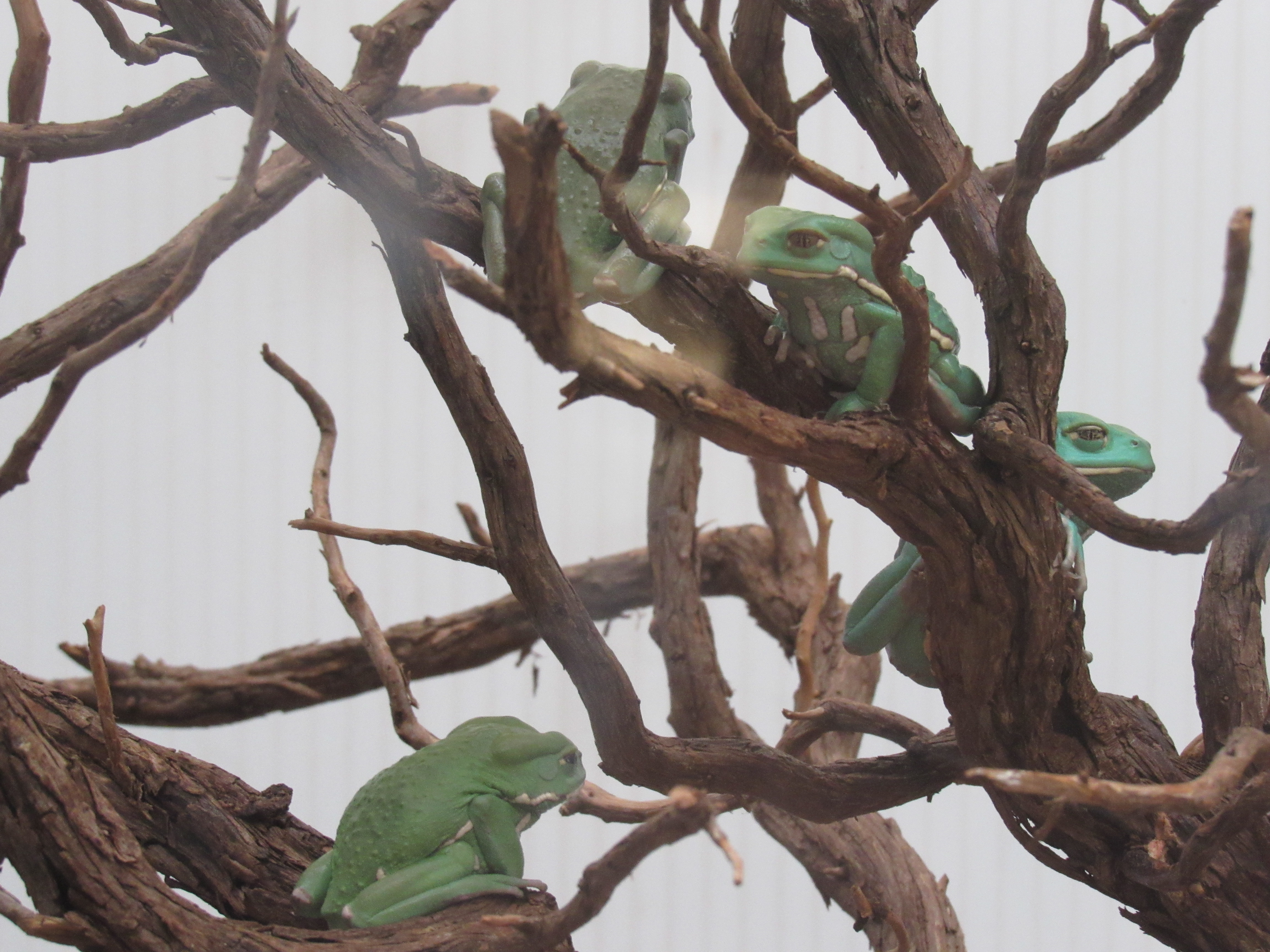

Waxy monkey leaf frogs can tolerate a wide range of body temperatures between about 20 and 40 °C. The upper limit of their body temperature is about 40 °C, which is higher than most frogs can withstand. This is advantageous in that the frog does not need to expend water for thermoregulation unless ambient temperatures exceed this limit. Waxy monkey leaf frogs are able to endure temperatures as low as 20 °C, and may prefer to be between 22 and 26 °C.

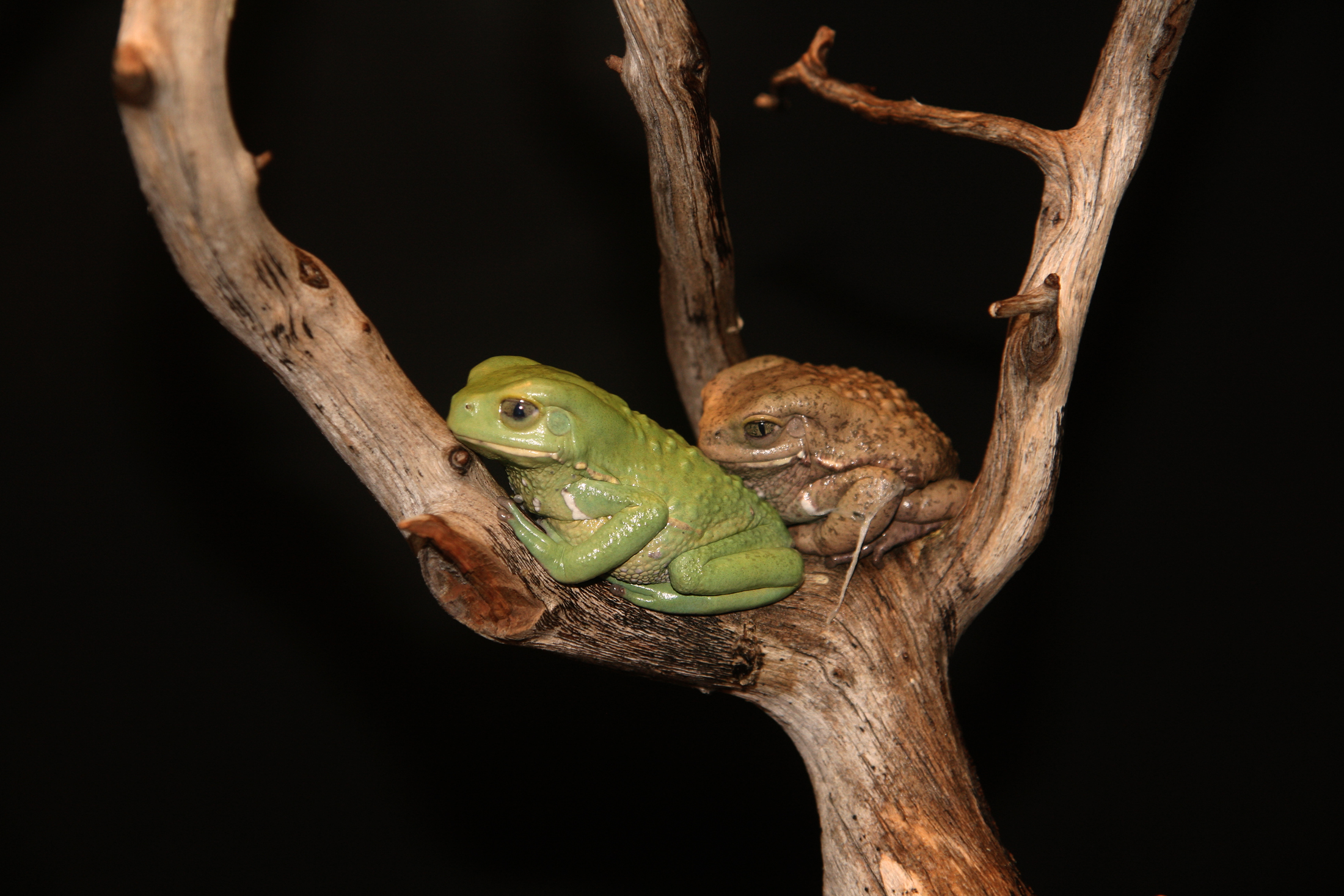
Green and brown coloured P. sauvagii

They have shown to be able modulate their body temperature through control of evaporative water loss. As in other species in the family of leaf frogs, it has physiological and behavioral adaptations to limit water loss, reducing it through the skin by lipid secretions and excretion of uric acid (uricotelism), as well as entering diurnal torpor. Lipid secretions are produced in a special type of cutaneous gland which is densely packed along the entire surface of the frog's body. If handled, frogs will use their legs to engage in wiping behavior, possibly as a grooming mechanism or to ensure their bodies are appropriately coated in secretions. The function of these secretions is undecided, varying in literature; a beneficial hydrophobic layer is supported by Blaylock et al., 1976, versus a hygroscopically induced water film barrier by Toledo and Jared, 1993. Nonetheless, this wiping method of retaining water is so effective that the frog's evaporative water loss is only 5–10% of that of other anurans and comparable to that of lizards. Waxy monkey leaf frogs are nocturnal, and spend most of the day resting on a perch. When perched, the frogs may enter a state of torpor which may help reduce respiratory evaporative water loss.

Waxy monkey leaf frogs generate many different pharmacologically active peptides as part of the defensive secretions covering their skin. Several of these peptides have found scientific uses as research ligands, including the opioid peptide dermorphin.
