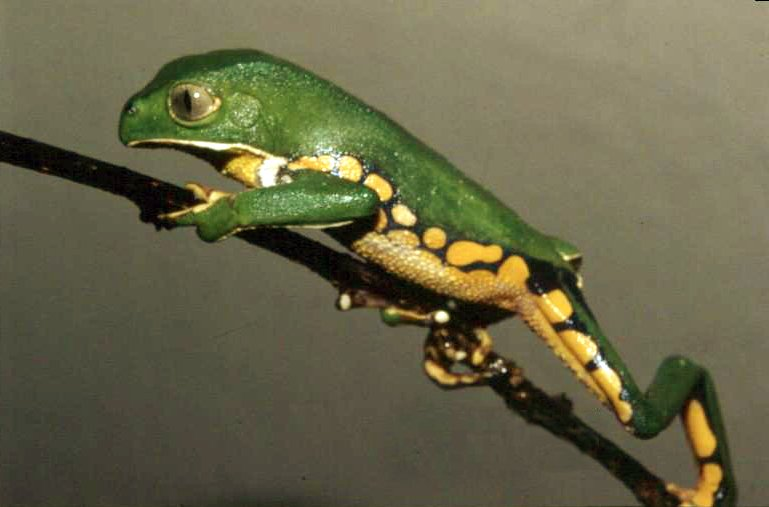
- Burmeister's leaf frog (Phyllomedusa burmeisteri)

Scientific classification
- Kingdom: Animalia
- Phylum: Chordata
- Class: Amphibia
- Order: Anura
- Family: Phyllomedusidae; Gunther, 1858

Diversity
- 8 genera, 66 species
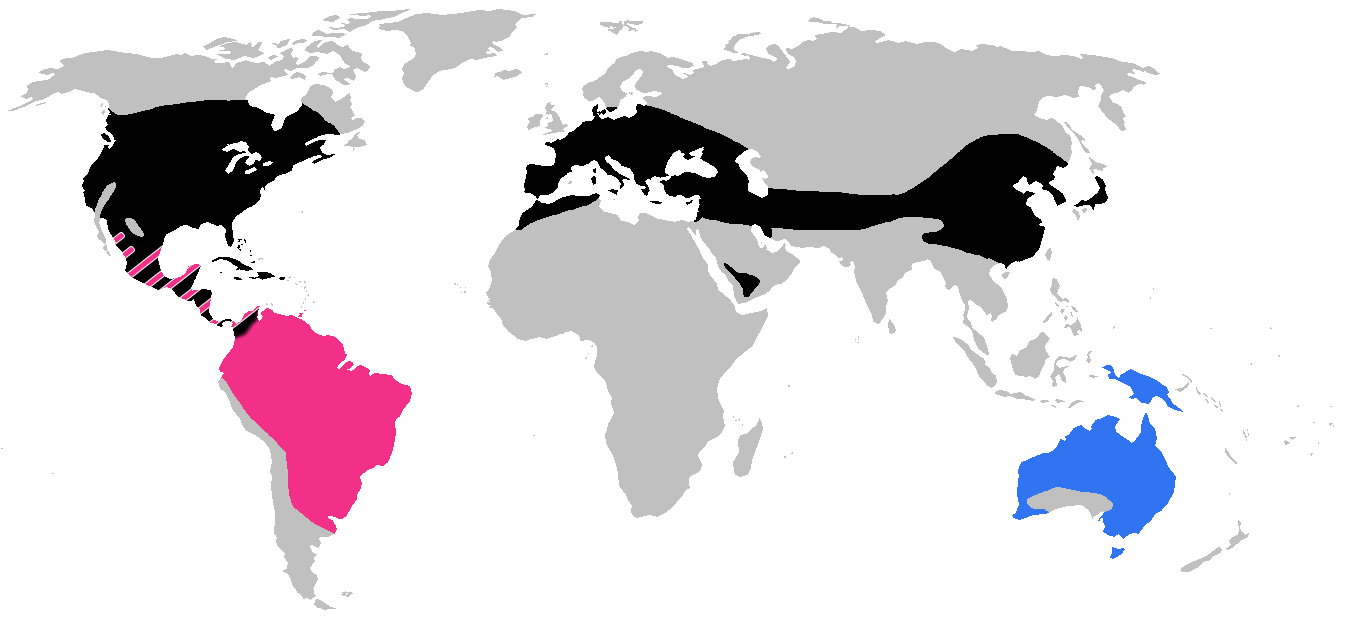
- Distribution of Phyllomedusidae in pink, with other tree frog families: Hylidae in black and Pelodryadidae in blue.

= Phyllomedusidae =

Subfamily of amphibians

Phyllomedusidae is a family of frogs found in the Neotropics commonly called leaf frogs. Formerly, they were often considered as a subfamily of the tree frog, Hylidae, but are increasingly considered a separate family.

The leaf frogs are considered to be the sister group to the Australian treefrogs (Pelodryadidae), a family of frogs known from Australia and New Guinea, despite being very geographically separated from them. The common ancestor of both families is thought to have lived in early Cenozoic South America, where the Phyllomedusidae still live, with the two families diverging from one another during the Eocene. The ancestors of Pelodryadidae likely colonized Australasia from South America via Antarctica, which at the time was not yet frozen over. The clade comprising both subfamilies is sister to the Hylidae, from which they diverged in the early Paleogene.

== Taxonomy ==
The family Phyllomedusidae contains the following genera:

- Agalychnis (14 species)
- Callimedusa (six species)
- Cruziohyla (three species)
- Hylomantis – rough leaf frogs (two species)
- Phasmahyla – shining leaf frogs (eight species)
- Phrynomedusa – colored leaf frogs (five living species, plus one recently extinct)
- Phyllomedusa (16 species)
- Pithecopus (12 species)
