= List of psychoactive plants, fungi, and animals =

This is a list of psychoactive plants, fungi, and animals.

== Plants ==
Psychoactive plants include, but are not limited to, the following examples:

- Cannabis: cannabinoids
- Tobacco: nicotine, anabasine, and other Nicotinic agonists, as well as beta-carboline alkaloids
- Coca: cocaine, ecgonine and other coca alkaloids
- Opium poppy: morphine, codeine, thebaine, papaverine, noscapine, and narceine
- Salvia divinorum: salvinorin A and other Salvinorins
- Khat: cathine and cathinone
- Kava: kavalactones
- Nutmeg: myristicin, elemicin, others
- Nightshade (Solanaceae) plants containing hyoscyamine, atropine, and scopolamine:
  - Datura
  - Deadly nightshade (Atropa belladonna)
  - Henbane (Hyoscyamus niger)
  - Mandrake (Mandragora officinarum)
  - Other Solanaceae

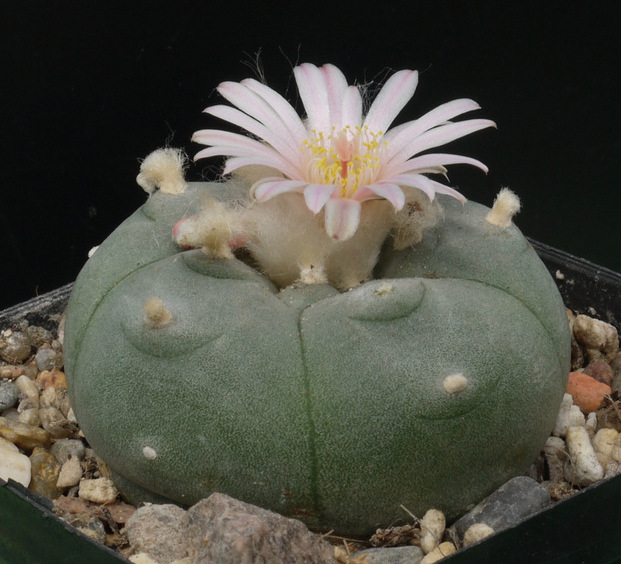
Peyote

- Psychoactive cacti, which contain mainly mescaline:
  - Peyote
  - Other Lophophora
  - Peruvian torch cactus
  - San Pedro cactus
    - Trichocereus macrogonus var. macrogonus (syn. Echinopsis peruviana)
    - Trichocereus macrogonus var. pachanoi (syn. Echinopsis pachanoi)
    - Trichocereus bridgesii
  - Other Echinopsis
- Mild stimulant and vasoconstrictor plants that contain mainly caffeine and theobromine:
  - Coffee
  - Tea (also contains theanine)
  - Guarana
  - Yerba mate
  - Cocoa
  - Kola

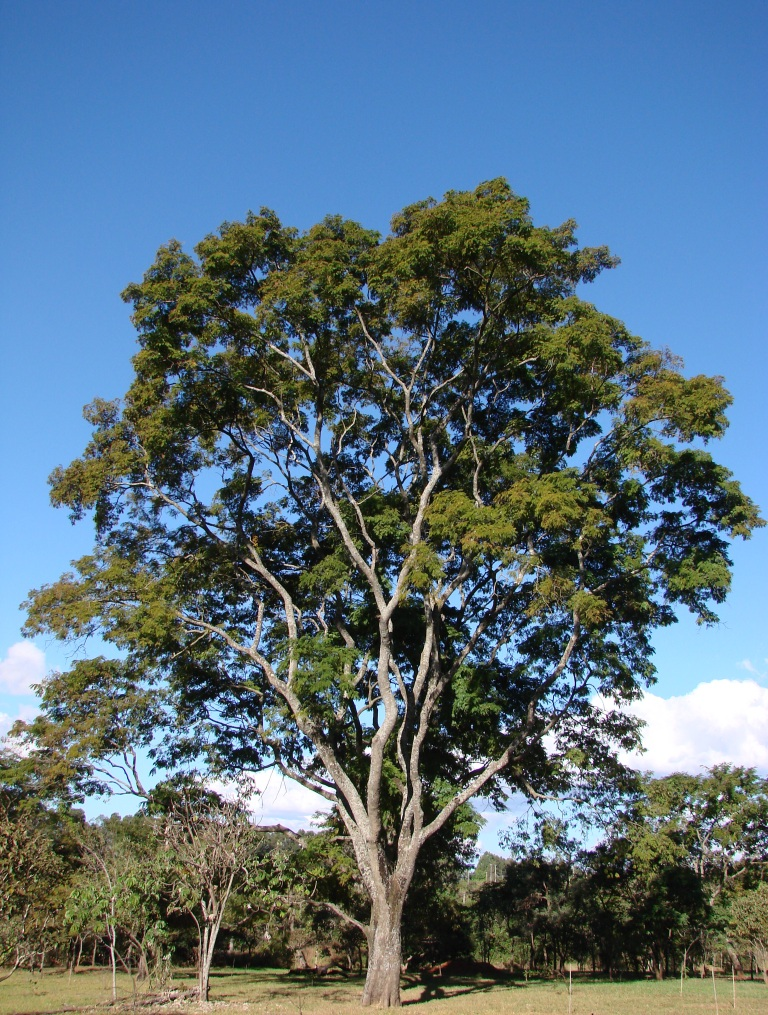
Anadenanthera colubrina produces beans used for cebil

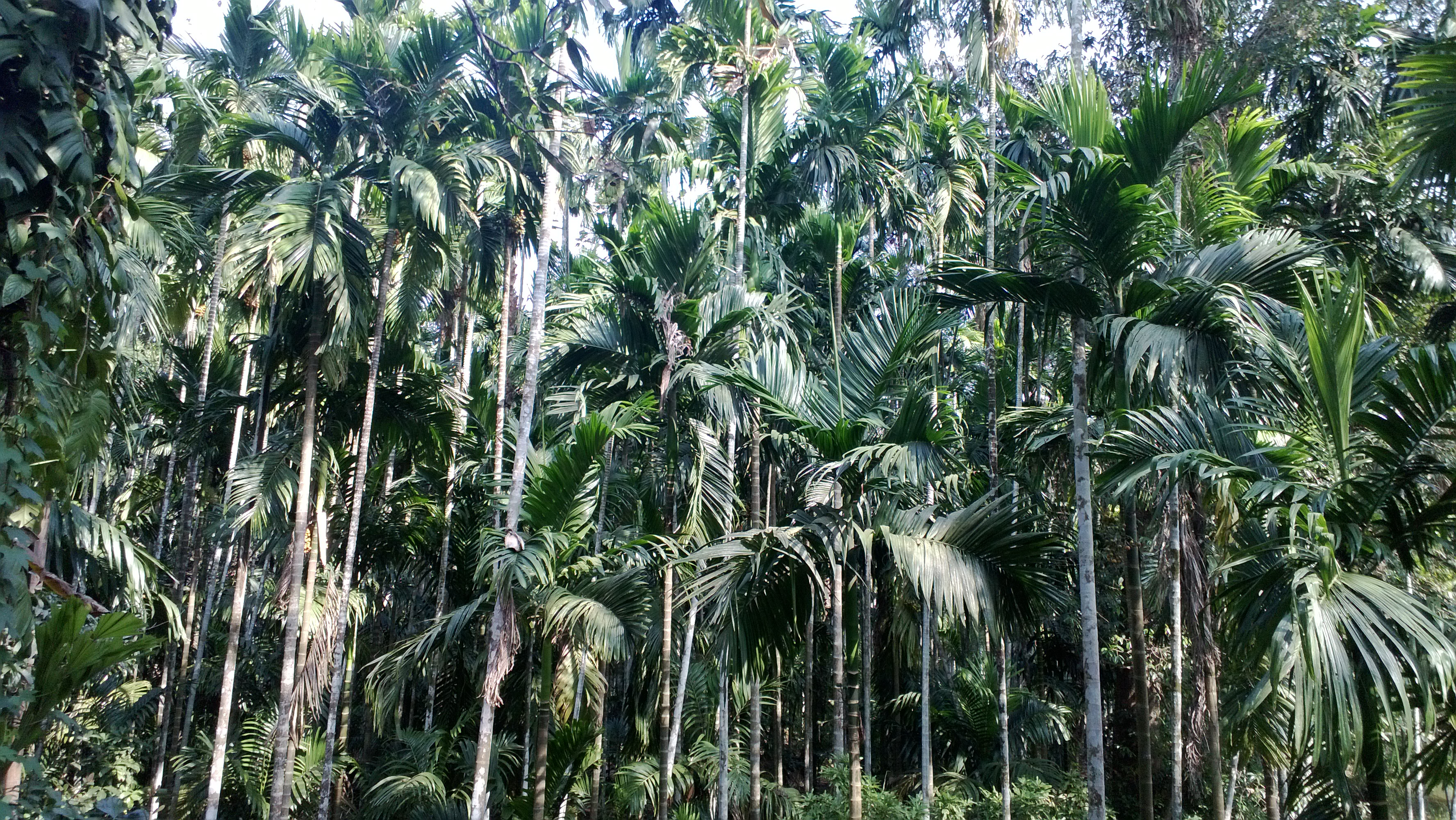
Areca palms in Ponda, India

- Other plants:
  - Mimosa hostilis: DMT
  - Chacruna: DMT, NMT
  - Cebil and Yopo: DMT, 5-MeO-DMT, bufotenin
  - Mucuna pruriens
  - Morning glory species, notably Hawaiian Baby Woodrose: lysergic acid amide
  - Sinicuichi: Vertine, Lyfoline, Lythrine and other sinicuichi alkaloids
  - Monotropa uniflora: Grayanotoxin (also found in Rhododendron pollen and mad honey)
  - Iboga: ibogaine, noribogaine, ibogamine, voacangine, 18-methoxycoronaridine
  - Ephedra: ephedrine
  - Acacia species
  - Damiana
  - Leonotis leonurus: Docosatetraenoylethanolamide and other alkaloids
  - Calea zacatechichi
  - Silene capensis
  - Valerian
  - Areca nut: arecaidine and arecoline
  - Kratom: mitragynine, mitraphylline, 7-hydroxymitragynine, raubasine, and other Kratom alkaloids
  - Rauvolfia serpentina: rauwolscine
  - Rauvolfia vomitoria
  - Nymphaea caerulea (Egyptian lotus or blue lotus): apomorphine, nuciferine
  - Yohimbe: yohimbine
  - Kanna: mesembrine and mesembrenone
  - Glaucium flavum (yellow horned poppy, yellow hornpoppy or sea poppy): glaucine
  - California poppies: Protopine and Californidine

== Fungi ==
- Psilocybin mushrooms: psilocybin, psilocin, aeruginascin, baeocystin, and norbaeocystin
- Amanita: Amanita muscaria: ibotenic acid, muscimol, and muscarine
- Amanita pantherina: similar to that of Amanita muscaria
- Amanita citrina: bufotenin (This mushroom is primarily toxic due to amatoxins)
- Amanita porphyria: bufotenin
- Dictyonema huaorani: psilocybin, DMT, and 5-MeO-DMT
- Collybia maculata: collybolide(unlikely to be psychoactive)

== Animals ==
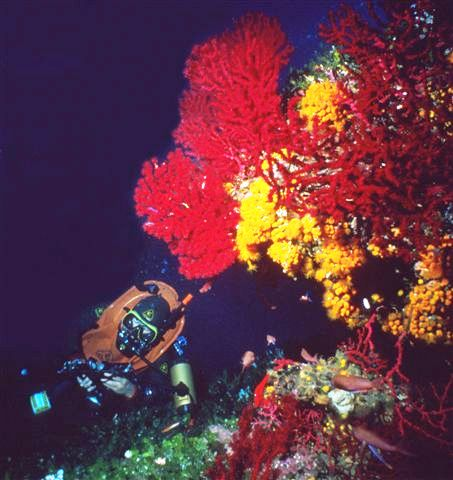
P. clavata (violescent sea-whip)

- Colorado River toad (Sonoran Desert toad or Bufo alvarius): 5-MeO-DMT and bufotenin
- Asiatic toad and certain tree frogs (Osteocephalus taurinus, Osteocephalus oophagus, and Osteocephalus langsdorfii): bufotenin
- Skin secretions of tree frogs belonging to the genus Phyllomedusa, notably P. bicolor (also known as kambo (sapo)): opioid peptides, including deltorphin, deltorphin I, deltorphin II, and dermorphin
- Hallucinogenic fish and ichthyoallyeinotoxism
- Ocean life containing DMT analogs:
  - Smenospongia aurea: 5-Bromo-DMT
  - Smenospongia echina: 5,6-Dibromo-DMT
  - Verongula rigida: 5-Bromo-DMT, 5,6-Dibromo-DMT, et al.
  - Eudistoma fragum: 5-Bromo-DMT
  - Paramuricea clavata: DMT, NMT
  - Villogorgia rubra: NMT

== See also ==
- Entheogenic drugs and the archaeological record
- List of plants used for smoking
- List of psychoactive substances and precursor chemicals derived from genetically modified organisms
- List of psychoactive substances derived from artificial fungi biotransformation
- List of substances used in rituals
- Medicinal fungi
- The Encyclopedia of Psychoactive Plants
- Pharmacotheon (1993/1996)
