= Kambo (drug) =

Traditional South American practice involving frog secretions

- vacina-do-sapo; sapo
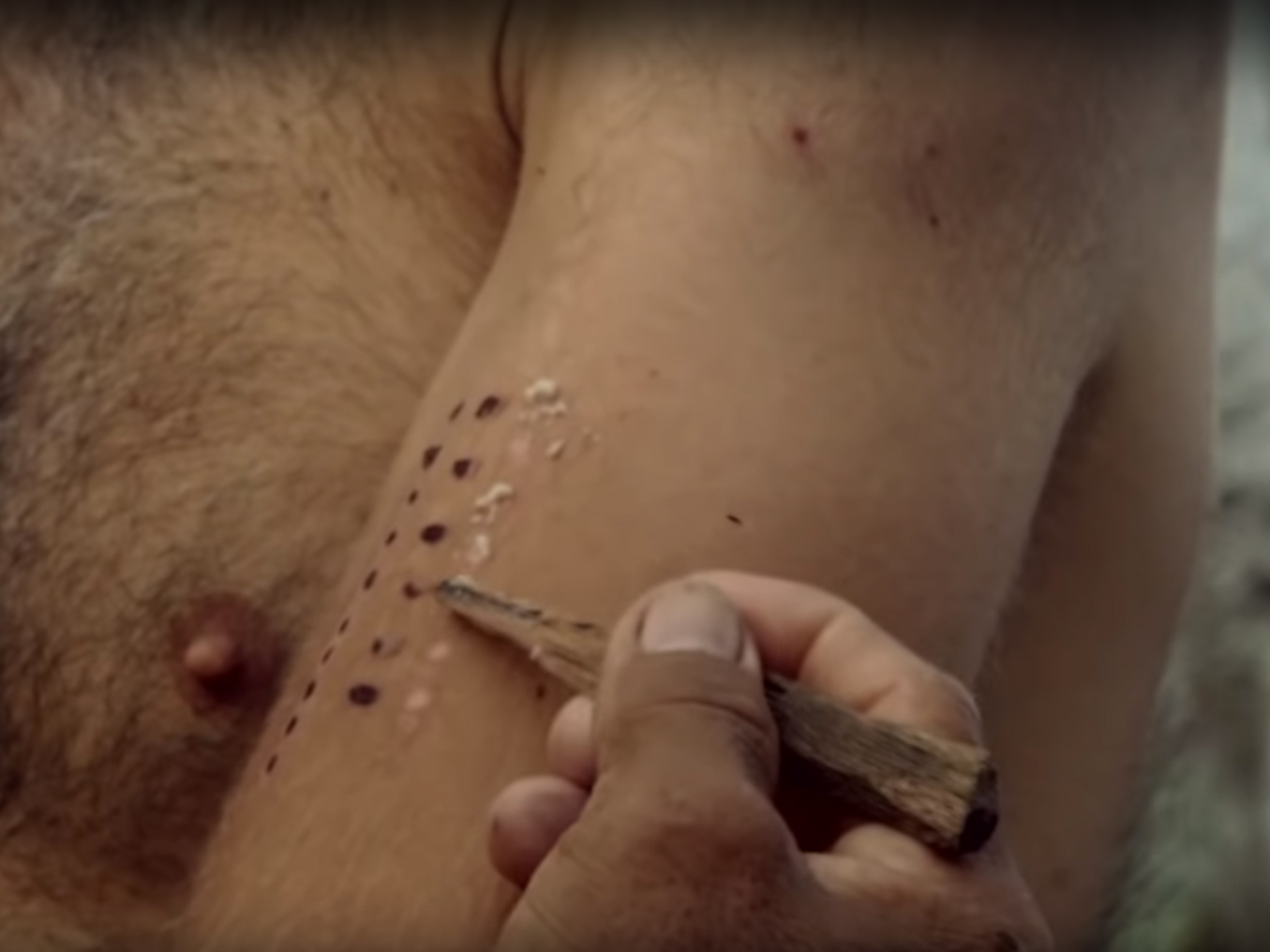
- A kambo ceremony: the frog secretion is being applied to the burnt skin.

Alternative therapy
- Claims: It is claimed that kambo will help with a number of issues, including depression, anxiety, addiction, fertility, fever, and mental clarity.
- NCCIH Classification: None

Kambo, also known as sapo (from Portuguese: sapo, lit. 'toad') or vacina-do-sapo, is substance derived from the natural secretions of an amphibian belonging to the Phyllomedusa family. Commonly the dried skin secretions of the giant leaf frog, known as the kambô in Portuguese, a species of frog, are used for ritualistic purposes with a strong religious and spiritual components. Less commonly it is used as a transdermal medicine, however, evidence for its effectiveness is limited.

Kambo is usually used in a group setting, called a kambo circle or kambo ceremony. Some of the effects on humans include tachycardia, hypotension, nausea, as well as vomiting and sometimes bowel movements owing to smooth-muscle contractions. A literature review of acute adverse events identified 11 reported cases involving severe adverse effects, including psychosis, SIADH, kidney injury, liver injury, dermatomyositis, esophageal rupture and seizures, with some cases resulting in death. Such severe outcomes are limited to a small number of published cases and some evidence suggests that pre-existing medical conditions may exacerbate these outcomes: a 2025 systematic review of deaths associated with kambo found that only a few fatal cases had been described and noted that reported severe outcomes may be exacerbated by pre-existing risk factors.

Kambo, which originated as a folk medicine practice among some indigenous peoples in the Amazon basin, is also administered as a complementary medicine and alternative medicine treatment in the West, often as a pseudoscientific cleanse or detox. The ceremony involves burning an arm or leg and applying the kambo secretion directly to the burn. Promoters claim that kambo helps with several illnesses or injuries. There is no scientific evidence that it is an effective treatment (Note: Quoting from the direct statements below [Australian] Therepeutic Goods Administration (TGA). "Consultation: Proposed amendments to the Poisons Standard – ACMS, ACCS and Joint ACMS/ACCS meetings, March 2021". "Kambo use in the absence of medically trained supervision represents a significant health risk, especially for people with cardiovascular disease due to the significant cardiovascular effects. Although rare, deaths have also been reported from kambo use. The significant adverse effects from the topical application of kambo to scarified or burnt areas of skin include: • nausea • vomiting • oesophageal rupture • diarrhoea • stomach pain • liver damage • burning sensation • lowered blood pressure (hypotension) • increased heart rate (tachycardia) These effects are seen as part of the spiritual purification/healing process, however, there is no clinical evidence of kambo having any beneficial medical effect. Onset of clinical signs and symptoms is rapid, and there have been reports of altered mental state, agitation, paranoia, delusions and general psychosis. There is insufficient information to characterise the risk from long-term repeated use of kambo." Australian Medical Association (March 2021). "Australian Medical Association Submission to the Therapeutic Goods Administration – Proposed amendments to the Poisons Standard" (PDF). p. 3. Archived from the original (PDF) on 2021-10-06. "The AMA supports the proposal to include a new Schedule 9 entry for Kambo. The AMA considers kambo to be a significant health risk for those who use it. In addition to its harmful effects both intended and adverse, the act of blistering the skin and applying kambo to the burnt area risks other health concerns such as infection. There is also a risk that using kambo would prevent a patient from seeing a medical practitioner for their medical condition and delay diagnosis. Kambo should be regulated under the Poisons Standard as it appears to be used as a therapeutic product by 'kambo practitioners'. There is currently insufficient evidence for its intended therapeutic effects.") and causal evidence is limited.

Excessive water consumption during or after kambo administration has been associated with SIADH and severe electrolyte imbalances. Controlling water intake is therefore an important safety measure. Naloxone is under study as a possible antidote; hospital treatment also includes medicines to protect organs from damage and restore electrolyte function.

== Terminology ==
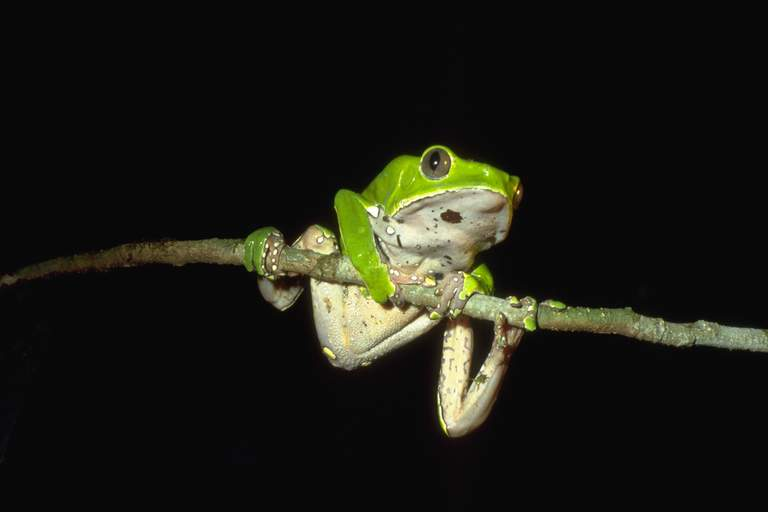
Phyllomedusa bicolor – Giant leaf frog

- Kampo pae, a name used by the Noke Kuin (formerly Katukina)
- Dow kiet, a word used by the Matses
- Sapo, kampô, kampu, vacina de sapo, or vacina da floresta, in Brazilian Portuguese

"Kambô" is a common name of Phyllomedusa bicolor, an Amazonian tree frog, also known as the blue-and-yellow frog, bicolored tree-frog, giant monkey frog, giant leaf frog, or waxy-monkey tree frog. "Sapo" means "toad" in Spanish and Portuguese. The frog is an anuran amphibian that inhabits the Amazon and Orinoco basins in South America.

== History ==
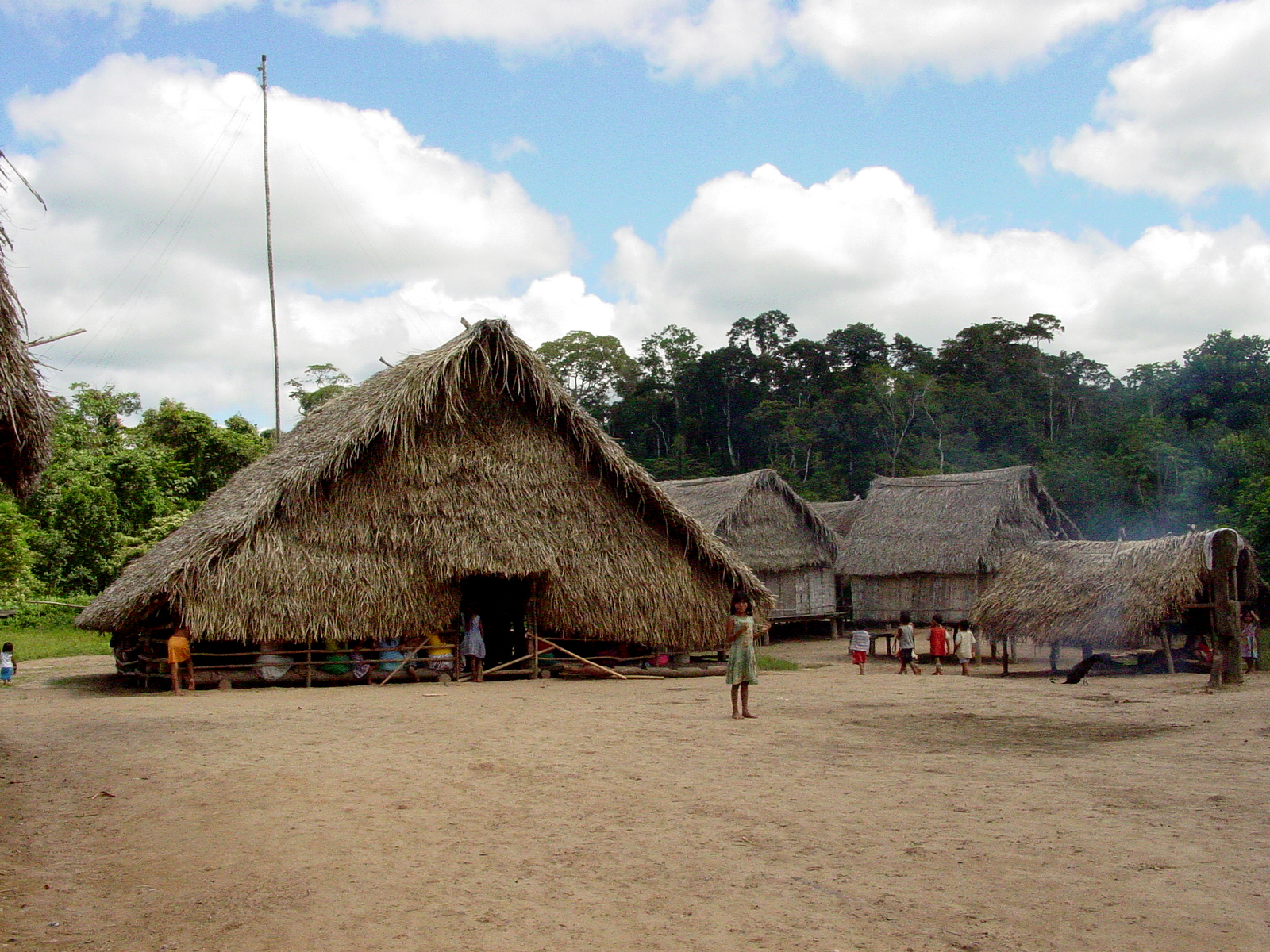
Caxinauá village in Acre

Natives who practice kambo are Panoan-speaking indigenous groups in the southeast Amazon rainforest, such as the Matsés, Marubo, Amahuaca, Kashinawa, Katukina, Yawanawá, and Kaxinawá. There are ethnographic studies on the use of kambo in traditional Noke Kuin medicine in the region of the state of Acre, in the Brazilian Amazon.

Since the mid-20th century, kambo has also been practiced in urban regions of Brazil. In 2004, Brazil banned the sale and marketing of kambo. Import is illegal in Chile. Outside of South America, it first became known as an alternative therapy in the late 2010s.

In 2021, the Therapeutic Goods Administration (TGA) of Australia banned the use of kambo in Australia and classified it as a schedule-10 poison. It is listed in the category for "substances of such danger to health as to warrant prohibition of sale, supply and use".

== Indigenous use ==
In contemporary discourse, the original ritualistic context in which kambo is consumed in indigenous communities has generally been ignored or looked down upon in favour of a more biomedical or western approach to health. Further inspection of indigenous usage allows for a more holistic understanding of its cultural importance and avoids the overt commercialisation of its spiritual qualities.

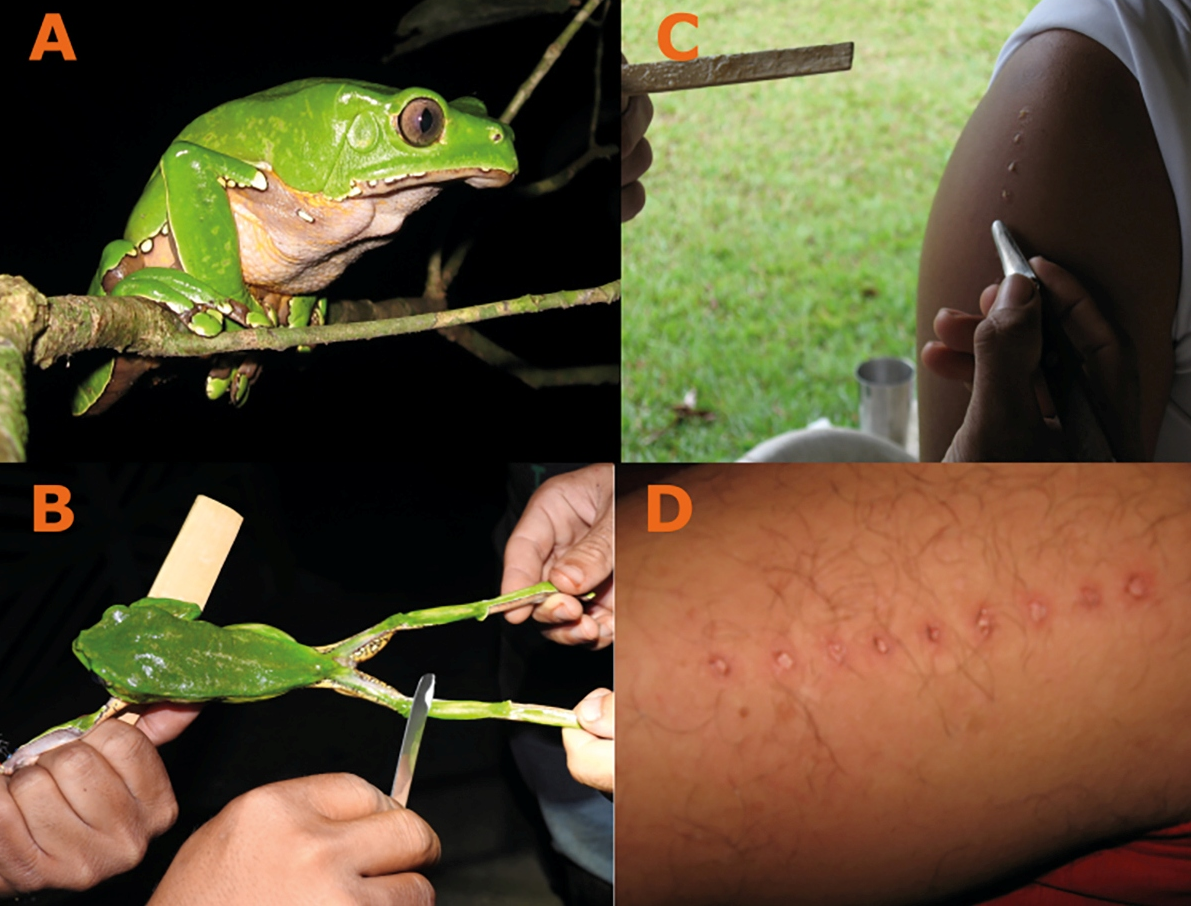
The kambo ritual. A) Phyllomedusa bicolor. B) Collecting the frog's secretions. C) Applying kambo to burns on the skin. D) Closeup of skin marks.

To collect the secretions from the frog's body, first, the frog has to be caught. A practitioner will tie the frog to four sticks placed in the ground with its limbs stretched. This causes the frog to become stressed enough to activate its defense mechanism and secrete a substance containing peptides from its skin. After these secretions are obtained, the frog is released back into the wild. The secretions are then left to dry. Small burns are created on the skin, and a small dose of the frog secretions is applied to the open wounds. In native practice, the secretions are removed from the wounds after 15 to 20 minutes, ending the acute symptoms.

The healing ritual typically begins with the consumption of caiçuma, a traditional, lightly fermented beverage prepared exclusively by women in the associated community. After the consumption of caiçuma, a person believed to have "good luck", usually a proficient hunter, is elected to make burns with a stick on the recipient before the secretions are applied. Kambo is viewed as a "medicine of the heart" and has both physical and, importantly, spiritual effects in the eyes of indigenous communities. This ritual thus operates not through the supernatural, but through a system of shared social reality. In this reality, the shaman and patient trust in the therapeutic powers of the shamanic ritual and the community as a whole has faith in its efficacy. In other contexts, kambô is reportedly used in ritualistic practice to improve hunting outcomes rather than as a healing method. In these circumstances, kambo is self-administered by an individual, without a shaman, who is expected to experience sickness and hallucinations over a short period of time, before becoming a more adept hunter.

Traditional practitioners claim that it aids fertility, cleanses the body and soul, increases strength, and brings good luck to hunts, though there is no scientific evidence for these claims. It is used by natives to who attempt to expel "panema" (bad spirit) and to induce abortions. The secretions are also commonly used in people who suffer from laziness, a condition perceived as unfavorable by the Noke Kuin as the person stops participating socially.

Joaquim Luz, a Yamanawa leader, criticized internet sales and kambo's use without the preparation or permission of indigenous peoples, saying that such users are at risk, even of death. Other native groups have also expressed concerns.

== Non-indigenous use ==
Outside South America, a kambo ceremony can involve just two people: the practitioner and the participant, or many participants at once, which is known as a kambo circle. Participants are equipped with water, a towel, and a bucket.

During the ceremony, small superficial burns are made, usually on the upper arm or leg, by the practitioner using a smoldering stick or vine, so that the secretion can be applied. The practitioner uses saliva or water to reconstitute the secretions and place it on top of the burnt skin. Short-term effects include nausea, vomiting, diarrhea, facial edema, headache and tachycardia.. The secretions seem to be vasoactive (affecting the circulation), explaining why they are absorbed rapidly.

Intoxication may occur immediately or within hours.

Journalist Hamilton Morris has covered kambo, including trying it and reporting on its effects.

=== Effects ===
The effects of kambo have been described. It produces relatively subtle psychoactive effects and does not appear to produce psychedelic or hallucinogenic effects. However, the drug is reported to produce a state of self-centered inwardness or internal connectedness. It has also been reported to cause apathy, drowsiness, dizziness, sedation, hallucinations, and euphoria, among others. Kambo also produces strong physical effects, including hypotension, sweating, tachycardia, severe nausea and vomiting, diarrhea, urination, edema, and general physical distress. In addition, it reportedly produces long-lasting and pronounced subacute or afterglow effects, such as clarity of thought, euphoria, feelings of well-being, positive mood and attitudes, increased resilience, positive and altruistic behavioral changes, and increased physical strength and stamina.

=== Medical claims ===
Non-indigenous users and practitioners of kambo claim it helps with a wide variety of issues and conditions. These claims include treating addiction, depression, and chronic pain, reducing fevers, increasing fertility, boosting energy and physical strength, and improving mental clarity. It is also claimed that kambo removes negative energy. There is currently no scientific evidence to support positive health effect claims.

There is no high-quality medical evidence on the safety and efficacy of the kambo practise: while studies of some of the individual peptides exist, clinical evidence on the safety and efficacy of kambo administration remains limited, as of November 2019. Adverse effects have been reported, including in cases involving experienced practitioners.

Kym Jenkins of the Royal Australian and New Zealand College of Psychiatrists, in a Sydney Morning Herald article, said "people with mental illness are a more vulnerable group anyway for a variety of reasons. If you're feeling very anxious or very depressed, you're automatically more vulnerable, and you could be more susceptible to people advertising or marketing a quick fix. I do have concerns that people can be preyed upon when they are more vulnerable."

The Australian Medical Association (AMA) supports the TGA's ban on the sale, supply, and use of kambo, saying it considers kambo to be a "significant health risk".

=== Marketing ===
In non-indigenous use, the frog secretion is described and marketed as a "detox" treatment, cleanse, purge, and as a "vaccine" that is "good for everything". Kambo has been marketed both as a "scientific" remedy, emphasizing the biochemistry, and as a "spiritual" remedy, emphasizing its Indigenous origins. Purging (deliberate vomiting) has been a popular treatment since the 1800s. "Detox" has been described by Edzard Ernst, emeritus professor of complementary medicine, as a term for conventional medical treatments for addiction, which has been "hijacked by entrepreneurs, quacks, and charlatans to sell a bogus treatment."

In Brazil, given the growth in the consumption of kambo in urban centers, there has been criticism by indigenous people, academics and communicators regarding the cultural appropriation of indigenous knowledge, the process of extracting the secretion of the Phyllomedusa bicolor frog, the form of transmission of wisdom, and the price charged by the ritual and the mystification of the origin of the frog.

There is also concern about pharmacological patents on the peptides identified in kambo (see biopiracy), the commercialization of the kambo outside its place of origin, and the unknown impact on frog populations, since many more are now removed from their natural habitats.

A 2022 review on the diagnosis and treatment of kambo cases noted the chemical complexity of the secretion and recommended greater surveillance of websites promoting its use and greater control of e-commerce and illicit trafficking involving the secretion.

== Environmental impact ==
The effect of the increased use of kambo rituals, and trafficking of the frogs and their secretions, may have an effect on the population of Phyllomedusa bicolor in its natural habitats: the forests of Bolivia, Peru, Brazil, the Guianas, Colombia, and Venezuela. Phyllomedusa bicolor is not considered an endangered species by the IUCN. Besides Phyllomedusa bicolor, other threatened endemic frog species of South America's neotropical regions have been poached and smuggled on the black market.

Species used

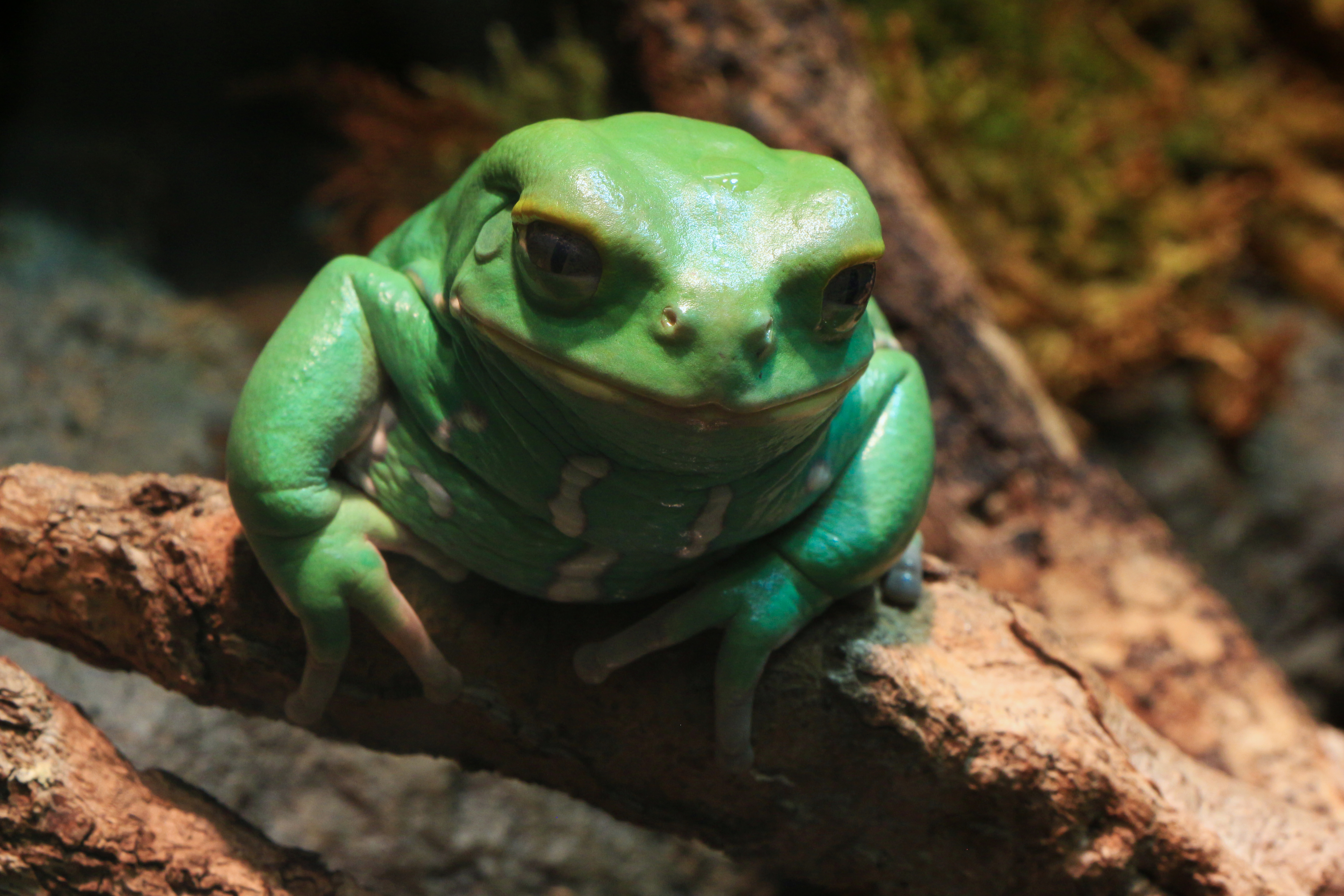
Phyllomedusa sauvagii

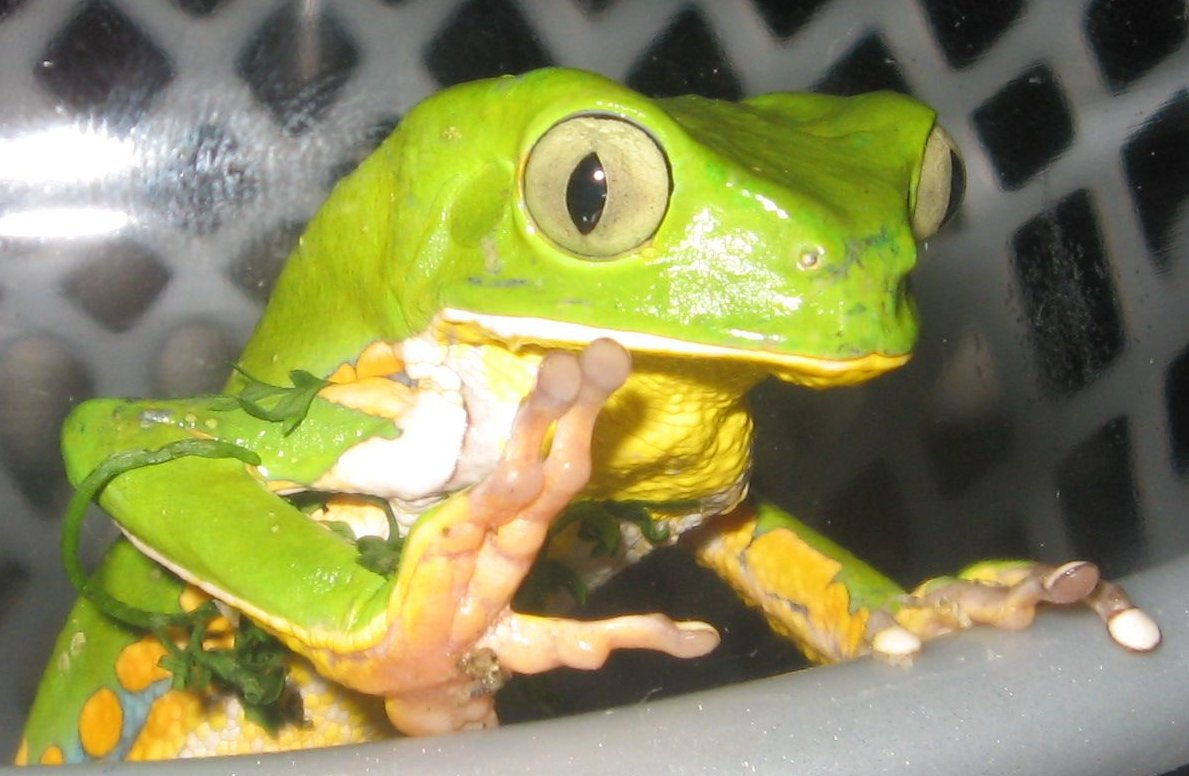
Tree frog, Caetité, Bahia, Brazil

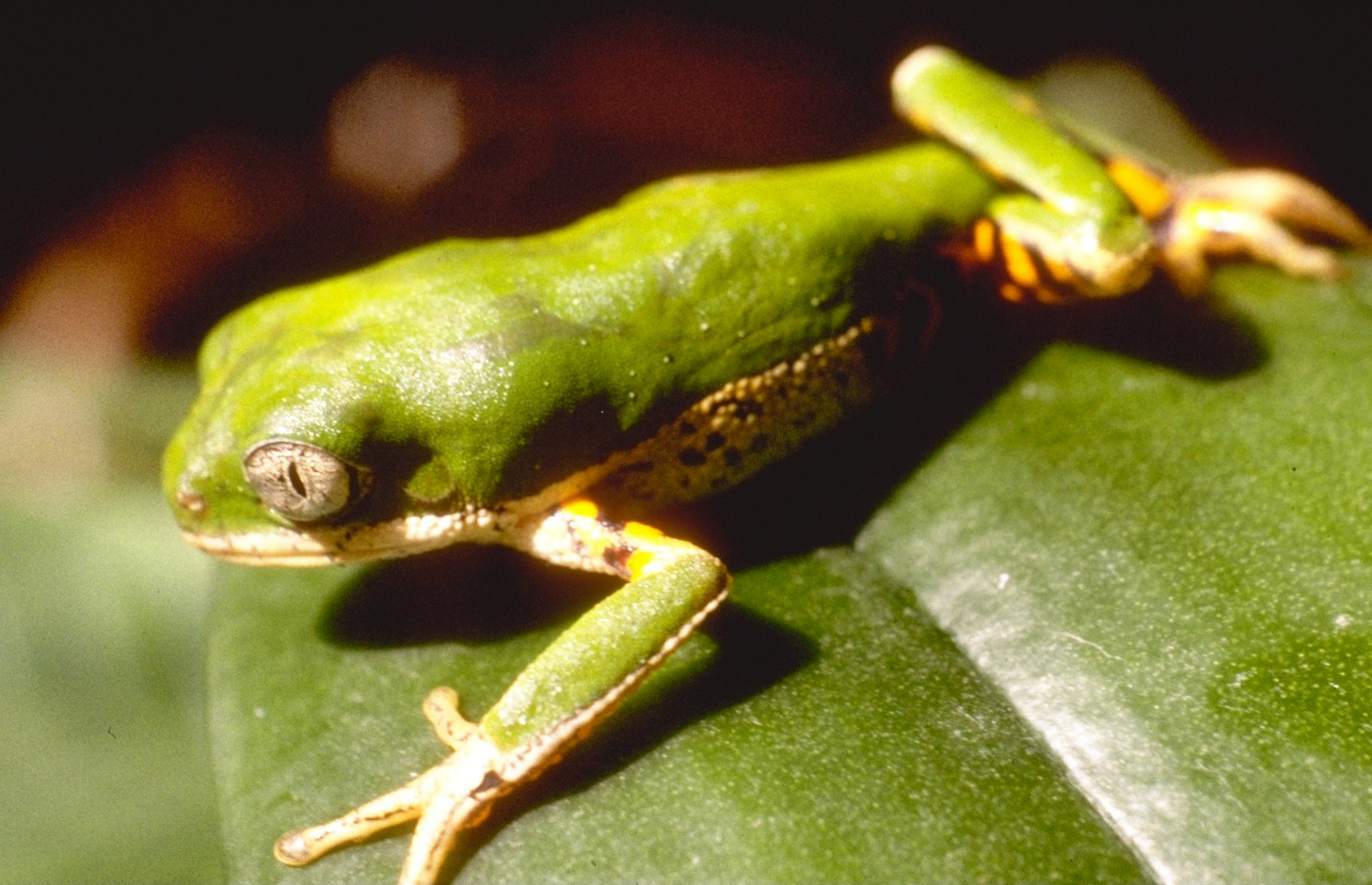
Phyllomedusa hypochondrialis

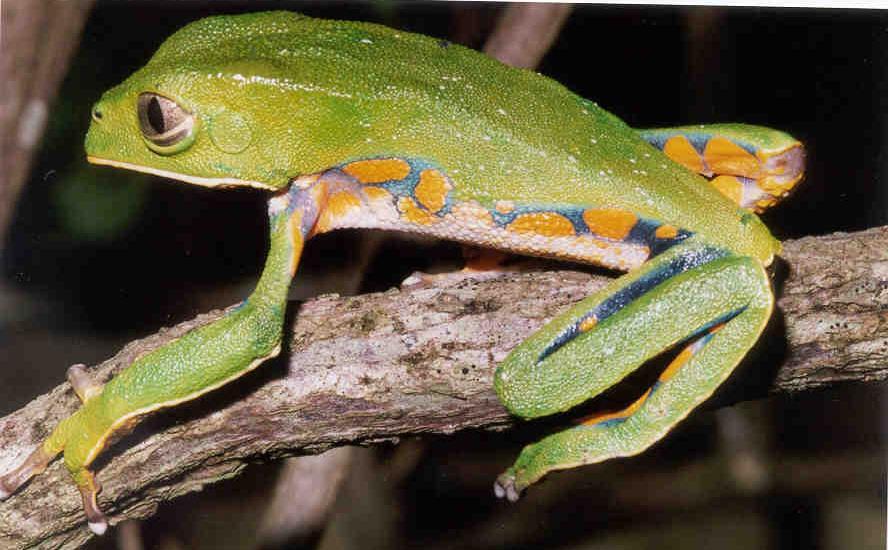
Phyllomedusa burmeisteri

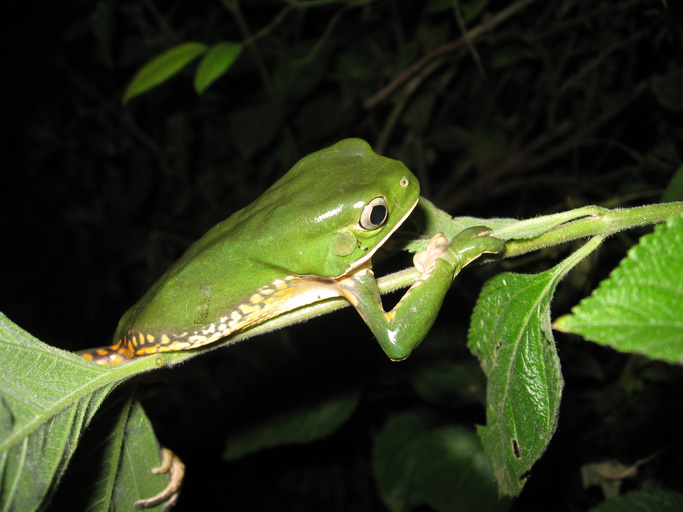
Phyllomedusa theringii

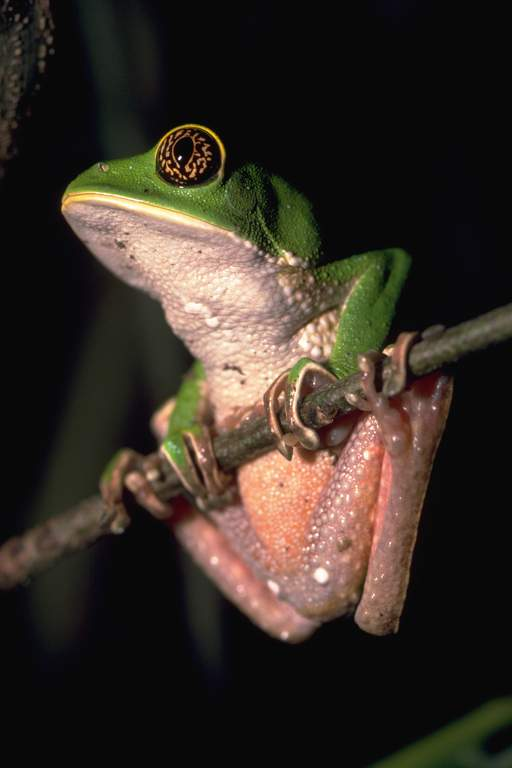
Phyllomedusa trinitatis

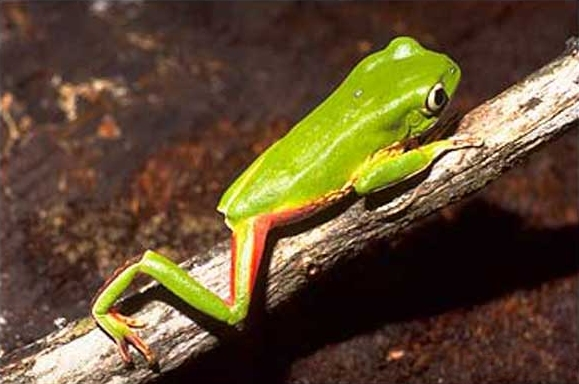
Phyllomedusa distincta

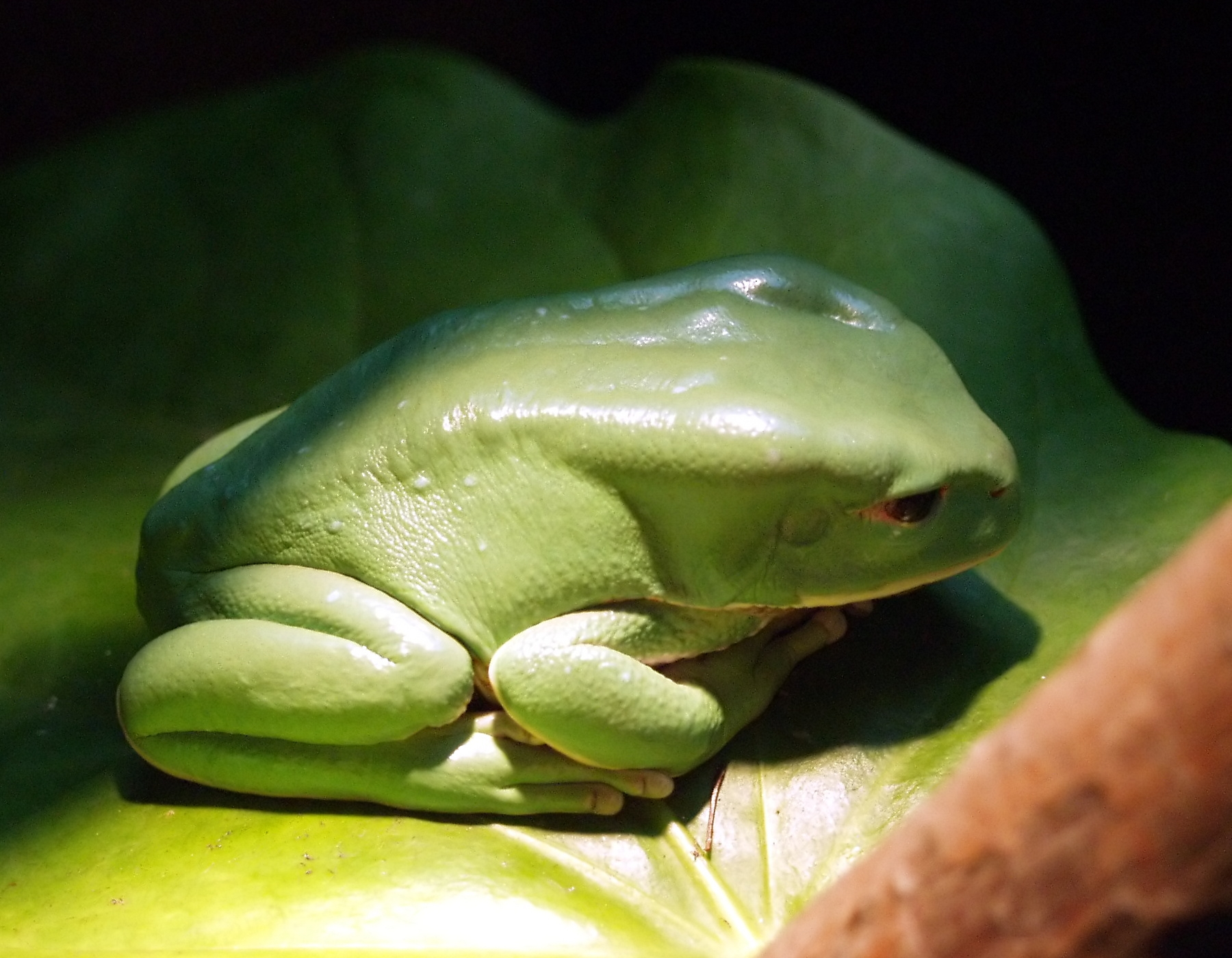
Phyllomedusa boliviana

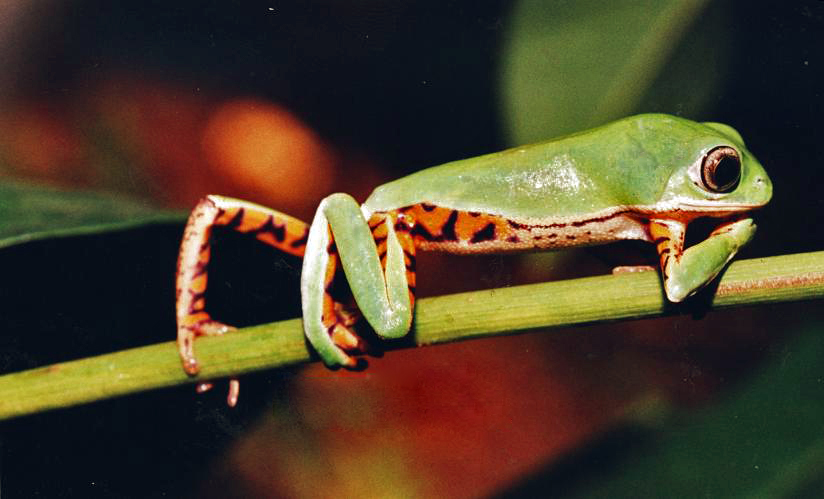
Phyllomedusa azurea

=== Parasitology ===
Smuggling amphibians such as Phyllomedusa bicolor can spread parasites. Zoos keep frogs for conservation purposes, and there are many parasites present in these animals that naturally occur only in the native habitats. It is recommended for imported amphibians to go through a quarantine process to verify they are not spreading parasites that could damage other ecosystems. Parasite infection rates in frogs is 51%, while in salamanders it is 13%. Individuals who want to have them as pets are obligated and encouraged to get them examined to detect gastrointestinal parasites that could potentially be harmful. Neocosmocercella fisherae is the first nematode species found parasitising Phyllomedusa bicolor from the Brazilian Amazon region.

== In Anthropology ==
Kambo is often promoted in western wellness media as an ancient natural detox ritual, a frame that emphasises its spiritual authenticity while saying little about the Indigenous communities who developed it. Anthropological research complicates this narrative. In a 2023 study, researchers Maria Fernanda Gebara, Sabaheta Ramcilovic-Suominen, and Michael Franz Schmidlehner introduced the concept of "bioepistemicide," an extension of sociologist Boaventura de Sousa Santos's concept of epistemicide, to describe how Indigenous knowledge associated with kambo is eroded as the practice becomes absorbed into Brazil's broader bioeconomy. Drawing on frameworks of epistemic injustice, biopiracy, and biocolonialism, the authors argue that although kambo has attracted growing commercial and scientific interest, including pharmacological research into peptide compounds found in Phyllomedusa bicolor secretion, the Katukina and other Indigenous peoples who developed and maintain the ritual are rarely recognised as producers of valid knowledge within these processes. Instead, their knowledge is frequently without corresponding recognition, consent, or benefit-sharing. The authors note that this pattern persists even where kambo is discussed respectfully, since crediting a practice's Indigenous origins is not the same as recognising the communities who hold that knowledge as ongoing authorities within this hegemonic structure. Popular accounts celebrating kambo's "ancient wisdom" can therefore coexist with an ongoing failure to recognise these communities as authorities over their own knowledge.

The dynamic Gebara et al. describe also resonates with a longer-standing distinction in anthropology between emic and etic understandings of practice.

=== Commodification ===
The first recorded instance of Kambo's indigenous practice observed and documented by outsiders was in 1908-1909 by Walter Roth. This was published 1915 in the 30th Annual Report of the Bureau of American Ethnology. The first pharmacological observation was in 1925, by French missionary Tastevin, additional observations were made in the 1970s. In 1984, non-academic researcher and writer Peter Gorman made first contact with the Matsés people.

Two years later after continual visits with village Río Lobo, Peter Gorman tries Kambo. Returning to America's Museum of Natural History and asking anthropologists if any of the members have heard of any tribe using frog secretions transdermally. They told him his report is "interesting but inadequate" as he failed to bring back a specimen nor a sample.

From 1988–1990 Gorman took multiple return trips for specimens and samples. Sending half the sample to Charles Myers at AMNH Herpetology, who passes it to John Daly at the National Institutes of Health (NIH), the US federal government's primary biomedical research agency. Additionally sending a live frog and second sample to Vittorio Erspamer at the FIDIA Research Institute in Rome.

In July 1993 Peter Gorman published "Making Magic" in Omni magazine. It contained a first-person account in popular-press linking indigenous use directly to peptide science. Gorman wrote both the narrative of village culture and Erspamer's peptide-by-peptide readout to speculatively explain each symptom, propelling Kambo's recognition in the west. In 2009 a VBS documentary created by Hamilton Morris on Kambo was released. 2 reports of Kambo also appear on Erowid, indicating that its use has spread to non-researchers.

Anthropologist Edilene Coffaci de Lima identified an identical situation unfolding in Brazil, described as a "shamanization of Kambo" in urban contexts. In Kambo's village communities, anyone with good moral standing can apply kambo for hunting or laziness. However, its use in the cities made it re-framed as something requiring "secret knowledge and initiation," turning every practitioner into a kind of shaman and every session into a ceremony. As Claude Lévi-Strauss puts it, the shaman does not merely imitate the healing event but "relives them in all their vividness, originality and violence". This is what he calls a "professional abreactor" for the group.

Since the early 2000's we have seen more and more new age practitioners hosting retreats. They are concentrated in Mexico, the Netherlands, Spain, Costa Rica, and Colombia. Patrons can experience a "detox", "sacred medicine" and "wellness experience". There are also home-visit practitioner models, of which multiple are operating across the USA and are only being advertised via Instagram accounts.

== Notable deaths ==
Several deaths have been reported in connection with kambo administration. A 2025 systematic review found that only a few fatal cases had been described in the medical literature and noted that reported severe outcomes may be exacerbated by pre-existing risk factors.

A 40-year-old businessman was charged in Brazil in 2008 with the illegal exercise of medicine and felony murder after administering kambo toxins to a business colleague who died; the deceased's son, who said his father had pressured him into participating, suffered more minor effects.

In Chile, in 2009, Daniel Lara Aguilar, who suffered from chronic lumbar disc disease, died immediately after taking kambo administered by a local shaman in a mass healing ceremony; the autopsy was inconclusive due to pre-existing conditions.

Medical literature reported a 2018 case in Italy of a man with obesity and ventricular hypertrophy, who, according to autopsy reports, died of cardiac arrhythmia while under the effects of kambo use.

In March 2019, kambo practitioner Natasha Lechner suffered a cardiac arrest and died while receiving kambo.

In April 2019, a homicide investigation was opened into the death by "severe cerebral edema" of a young person who had taken kambo in Chile; the import of the frog and its secretions is illegal in Chile.

In October 2021, Australian man Jarred Antonovich died at a festival in New South Wales from a perforated esophagus suspected to be caused by excessive vomiting after being administered kambo and dimethyltriptamine (DMT). After a car accident in 1997 from which he had to learn to walk and talk again, he was left with lasting impediments, the inquest heard, which may have contributed to the esophageal rupture.

In April 2026, in the UK, 40-year old Kristian Trend (a wellness coach and cancer survivor) died after a kambo ceremony held in an apartment in Leicester.

== Contraindications ==
Kambo practitioners commonly screen for contraindications before administration. Its administration commonly induces intense vomiting, which can increase intra-esophageal pressure and, in rare cases, result in esophageal rupture. Conditions that damage the esophagus may increase the risk of such injury, and practitioner guidelines list a history of esophageal rupture or tear as a contraindication. A case report has also raised concerns about the use of Kambo in patients undergoing or recently having undergone cancer treatment.

== Pharmacology ==
Chemical structure of dermorphin

The frog secretes a range of small chemical compounds of a type called peptides, which have several different effects. Peptides found in the frog secretions include the opioid peptides dermorphin and deltorphin, the vasodilator sauvagine, and dermaseptin, which exhibits antimicrobial properties in vitro. Various other substances such as phyllomedusin, phyllokinin, caerulein, and adrenoregulin are also present. There is active medical research into the peptides found in the skin secretions of Phyllomedusa bicolor, focusing on discovering their biological effects. There have been some preclinical trials in mice and rats, but no phase-1 tests or clinical trials of safety in humans, as of November 2019. The opioid peptides in kambo are thought to be unable to cross the blood–brain barrier and hence to be peripherally selective due to their peptide nature. The mechanism of action of kambo is unknown.

Most of the kambo-related bioactive peptides so far characterized have displayed potential applications in medicine, such as phyllocaeruleins with hypotensive properties, tachykinins and phyllokinins as vasodilators, dermorphins and deltorphins with opiate-like properties, and adenoregulins with antibiotic properties.

In a clinical trial of a randomized, placebo-controlled study in postoperative pain, dermorphin administered via the intrathecal route was "impressively superior" over the placebo and the reference compound morphine." Due to the numerous biological activities of these substances and the similarities with the amino acid sequences related to mammalian neuropeptides and hormones, many have aroused the interest from a medical and pharmacological perspective, such as in the production of new drugs.

== See also ==
- Activated charcoal cleanse
- Ayahuasca
- Detoxification (alternative medicine)
- Detoxification foot baths
- Colon cleansing
- Placebo
- Quackery
- Skepticism
- List of topics characterized as pseudoscience
- Neo-shamanism
