= THC production by yeast =

Tetrahydrocannabinol production method

Cannabinoids, including tetrahydrocannabinol (THC), the active drug in cannabis, can also be produced by bioengineered yeast, a process colloquially known as pharming. In 2007, a research group reported the successful transgenic placement of a THCA synthase gene from Cannabis plant into the Pichia pastoris yeast, giving the yeast the ability to turn the precursor molecule cannabigerolic acid into THCA. In 2019, researchers at University of California, Berkeley reported in Nature that they had bioengineered yeast able to completely synthesize THC, CBD, and other cannabinoids, using only sugar as a food.

At least two companies have pursued intellectual property protection for biosynthesis of cannabinoids in yeast. The U.S. National Center for Complementary and Integrative Health has funded research into "techniques to synthesize cannabinoids in yeast", saying that if successful, it "would cost less than obtaining them from the cannabis plant".

== See also ==
- Conversion of CBD to THC
- List of psychoactive substances and precursor chemicals derived from genetically modified organisms
- Hops and cannabinoids
