= C22H20O7 =

The molecular formula C_{22}H_{20}O_{7} may refer to:

- Collybolide
- Gnetucleistol A
