= List of psychoactive substances derived from artificial fungi biotransformation =

List of psychoactive substances derived from artificial fungi biotransformation.

- 4-HO-DET and 4-PO-DET mushrooms derived from Psilocybe cubensis mycelium in substrate with added DET.
- 4-HO-DiPT mushrooms derived from Psilocybe cubensis mycelium in substrate with added DiPT.
- 4-HO-DPT mushrooms derived from Psilocybe cubensis mycelium in substrate with added DPT.
- Baeocystin (4-PO-NMT) found in Psilocybe cubensis mushrooms from mycelium in substrate with added NMT.

== See also ==
- Biodiversity and drugs
- List of psychoactive substances and precursor chemicals derived from genetically modified organisms
