= Peter Gorman (journalist) =

- Gorman on Psychedelic Salon in 2015
- Born: February 12, 1951; Queens, New York
- Died: April 24, 2022 (aged 71); Burleson, Texas
- Occupations: Journalist, author
- Years active: 1984–2022
- Known for: Work at High Times, work on kambo, various books
- Notable work: Ayahuasca in My Blood (2010); Sapo in my Soul (2015); Magic Mushrooms in India and Other Fantastic Tales (2021)
- Website: The Gorman Blog

Peter Gorman (12 February 1951 – 24 April 2022) was an American journalist and author who covered psychoactive drugs. He was a writer and editor at High Times for 14 years, from 1986 to 2000, and over that time rose up from senior editor, to executive editor, and then to editor-in-chief of the magazine. Gorman wrote hundreds of articles for High Times, particularly in the area of psychedelic drugs. He interviewed figures in the area of psychedelics including Richard Evans Schultes, Albert Hofmann, and Alexander Shulgin. Gorman also visited and covered the Temple of the True Inner Light, a psychedelic church in Manhattan in New York City. Gorman is known for exploring the Amazon rainforest and is credited with introducing kambo (sapo), the skin secretions of Phyllomedusa bicolor and a psychoactive drug, to the Western world. He wrote multiple books, including on psychedelics and other drugs. Gorman was interviewed by Hamilton Morris in 2021 shortly before his death.

== Selected publications ==
=== Books ===
- Fremin, Johan; Gorman, Peter; Maher, Morgan (2010). Ayahuasca in My Blood: 25 Years of Medicine Dreaming. Johan Fremin. ISBN 978-1-4528-8290-1.
- Gorman, Peter (2015). Sapo In My Soul: The Matsés Frog Medicine. Gorman Bench Press. ISBN 978-0-692-35349-3.
- Gorman, Peter (2021). Magic Mushrooms in India and Other Fantastic Tales. Gorman Bench Press. ISBN 979-8-4549-0821-8.
