= Limekiln Wood Nature Reserve =

Nature reserve in Cheshire, England

Coordinates: 53.125°N 2.208°W

Limekiln Wood Nature Reserve is a 13.1-hectare (32-acre) nature reserve in Cheshire, England, north of the village of Mow Cop. A Site of Special Scientific Interest, it is managed by the Cheshire Wildlife Trust.

Standing on the north-west slope of the Mow Cop ridge, Limekiln Wood is part of a larger wood complex that has cloaked the ridge since the end of the last ice age. The trees reflect the thin soils and exposed location rising above the Cheshire plain: oak, downy birch and rowan predominate, with alder in the wetter patches and dense stands of holly beneath the canopy. There are a number of wet flushes through the wood, and these are home to a particularly rich ground flora; opposite-leaved golden saxifrage, marsh marigold, yellow pimpernel, meadowsweet and lesser celandine are all abundant. In drier areas honeysuckle, greater stitchwort, wood sorrel and foxglove add colour. In the autumn, varieties of fungi including foxy spot, stinkhorn and blushing bracket can be found.
