= Conversion of CBD to THC =

Synthesis of THC from CBD

Conversion of cannabidiol (CBD) to tetrahydrocannabinol (THC) can occur through a ring-closing reaction. This cyclization can be acid-catalyzed, or brought about by thermal methods such as heating, burning or flash vacuum pyrolysis.

== Known methods ==
Phytocannabinoids exist like precursors to their pharmacologically active counterparts. At least three independent methods have successfully converted CBD to THC.

- Despite the CBD and THC having the same molecular weight, multiple analytical methods are able to differentiate them.
- "on the recovery of both THC (86.7−90.0%) and CBD (92.3−95.6%). The slightly lower recovery of THC can be explained by the fact that THC is less polar than CBD and more likely to remain in the nonpolar sunflower oil."

=== By heat ===
CBD heated to 175, or 250–300 °C may partially be converted into THC. Even at room temperature, trace amounts of THC can be formed as a contaminant in CBD stored for long periods in the presence of moisture and carbon dioxide in the air, with storage under inert gas required to maintain analytically pure CBD.

- Heat is required to decarboxylate the non-psychoactive phytocannabinoid THCA to its psychoactive form, THC. Likewise, CBDA turns into CBD.
- From hemp plant material in an oven, cannabinoid concentration plots (time/temp) show THC:
- STP 0 minutes 0.20 mg/g
- 140-160C 20 minutes 0.27 mg/g
- 140-160C 60 minutes 0.05-0.15 mg/g
- 120C 45 minutes 0.27 mg/g
- 120C 90 minutes 0.20 mg/g
- 100C 90 minutes 0.25 mg/g
- 80C 120 minutes 0.24 mg/g

Multiple oxidation products form during degradation in the presence of oxygen, a process known as thermolysis In contrast, the absence of oxygen leads to a process called pyrolysis which significantly reduces the loss.

- "...the boiling point for THC has been determined at 157 °C, and the boiling point range for CBD sits between 160 and 180 °C."

=== With acid ===
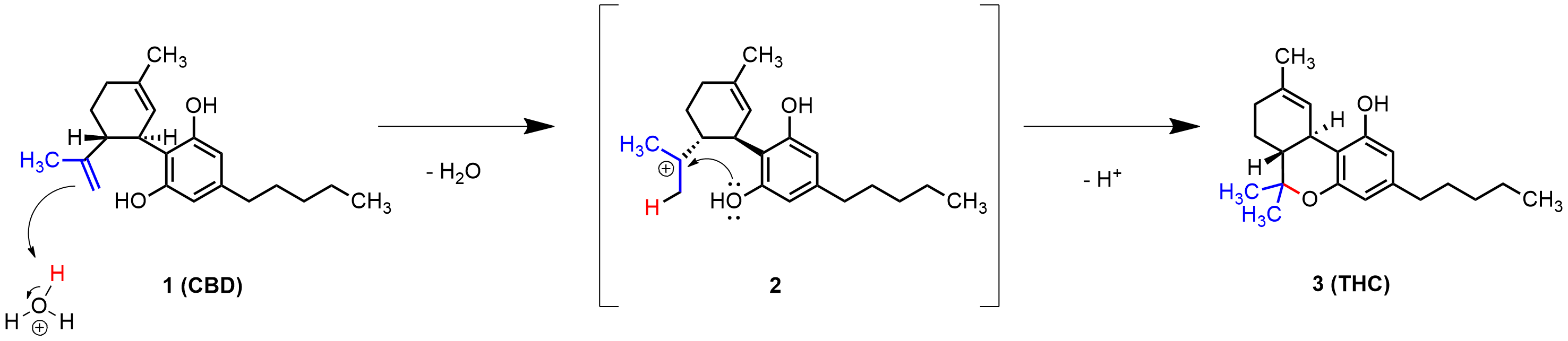
Mechanism of the acid catalyzed conversion of CBD into THC

CBD converts to various isomers of THC with catalysts in acidic environments. A wide variety of acids can be used, though different conditions result in varying yield and formation of characteristic impurities.

- Catalytic acid solution in 5 minutes in a microwave oven with a 40% Δ^{9}-THC and 35% Δ^{8}-THC yield.
- Adding protons until the CBD sterically-hindered alcohol functional group cyclises to the pyran ring of THC.
- Lewis acids
- Gaoni and Mechoulam described a method for converting CBD to Δ^{9}-THC comprising refluxing a mixture of CBD in ethanol containing 0.05% hydrogen chloride for 2 hours. Percentage yield of Δ^{9}-THC (Δ^{1}-THC) was 2%. Using boron trifluoride, the yield was 70% although purity was not given.

=== With zeolite ===
Methods have been claimed for converting CBD to a mixture of Δ^{8}-THC and Δ^{9}-THC using "Zeolites selected from the group consisting of analcime, chabazite, clinoptilolite, erionite, mordenite, phillipsite, and ferrierite."

== Purification ==
=== Δ-8-Tetrahydrocannabinol to THC ===
When CBD is treated with acid, Δ-8-Tetrahydrocannabinol may form as an impurity. Nevertheless, Δ-8-Tetrahydrocannabinol can be isolated and subsequently converted into THC.

- Δ-8-Tetrahydrocannabinol, which can be converted to THC by addition of HCl followed by dehydrochlorination.
- Treatment of the purified Δ8 -THC under Lucas' reagent gives the chloro compound. Following treatment with potassium tert-amylate, the desired (-)-6a,10 a-trans-Δ9 -tetrahydrocannabinol is yielded. The Mechoulam and Petrzilka methods require three steps and involve at least two careful chromatographic separations to obtain (-)-6a,10 a-trans-Δ9 -tetrahydrocannabinol of high purity.

== In vivo ==
There is a disputed hypothesis that oral CBD could be metabolized into THC under acidic conditions in the stomach and then absorbed into the bloodstream. However, neither THC nor 11-hydroxy-THC have been detected in blood in animals or humans after ingesting purified CBD. There is no direct evidence of the conversion of CBD to THC in the human gut.

== History ==
The conversion of CBD to THC by a mineral acid driven cyclization reaction was researched heavily and eventually patented by famous organic chemist Roger Adams in the 1940s.

== See also ==
- THC production by yeast
