= List of psychoactive substances and precursor chemicals derived from genetically modified organisms =

List of various substances that are either psychoactive themselves or serve as precursors to psychoactive compounds, all sourced from genetically modified organisms (GMOs).

== Psychoactive substances ==
Psychoactive substances derived from genetically modified organisms.

- Cocaine
  - GMO plant: Nicotiana benthamiana (a tobacco plant)
- Psilocybin
  - GMO bacteria: Escherichia coli
  - GMO yeast: Baker’s yeast
- THC
  - GMO bacteria: Zymomonas mobilis (used to produce tequila)
- Tropane alkaloids: Hyoscyamine and scopolamine
  - GMO yeast: Baker’s yeast

== Precursor chemicals ==
Precursor chemicals derived from genetically modified organisms.

- Lysergic acid (LSD precursor)
  - GMO yeast: Baker’s yeast
- Thebaine (morphine precursor)
  - GMO bacteria: E. coli

== See also ==
- Biodiversity and drugs
- List of psychoactive substances derived from artificial fungi biotransformation
