= Eudistoma fragum =

Scientific classification
- Domain: Eukaryota
- Kingdom: Animalia
- Phylum: Chordata
- Subphylum: Tunicata
- Class: Ascidiacea
- Order: Aplousobranchia
- Family: Polycitoridae
- Genus: Eudistoma
- Species: E. fragum

Binomial name
- Eudistoma fragum (Monniot, 1988)

Species of sea squirt

Eudistoma fragum is a species of sea squirt in the class Ascidiacea. The scientific name of the species was first validly published in 1988 by Françoise Monniot.
