= Artificial fungi biotransformation =

Biotransformation of psychedelic substances using mushrooms

Mushrooms have been cultivated with novel psychedelic substances through biotransformation, by artificially adding selected psychoactive substances to the growing substrate. The biotransformed alkaloids could be found in the culture medium.

However, not all substances will be incorporated into mycelium. For example, caffeine did not get structurally changed.

== See also ==
- Mycoremediation
