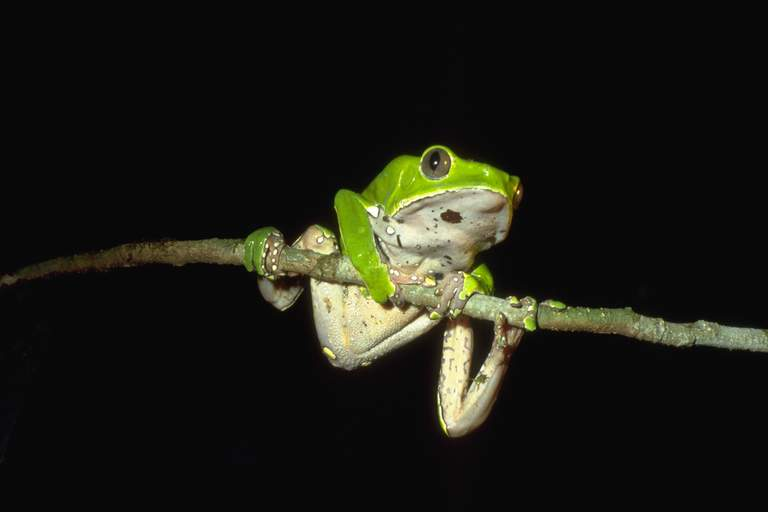

Conservation status
- Least Concern (IUCN 3.1)

Scientific classification
- Kingdom: Animalia
- Phylum: Chordata
- Class: Amphibia
- Order: Anura
- Family: Phyllomedusidae
- Genus: Phyllomedusa
- Species: P. bicolor

Binomial name
- Phyllomedusa bicolor (Boddaert, 1772)
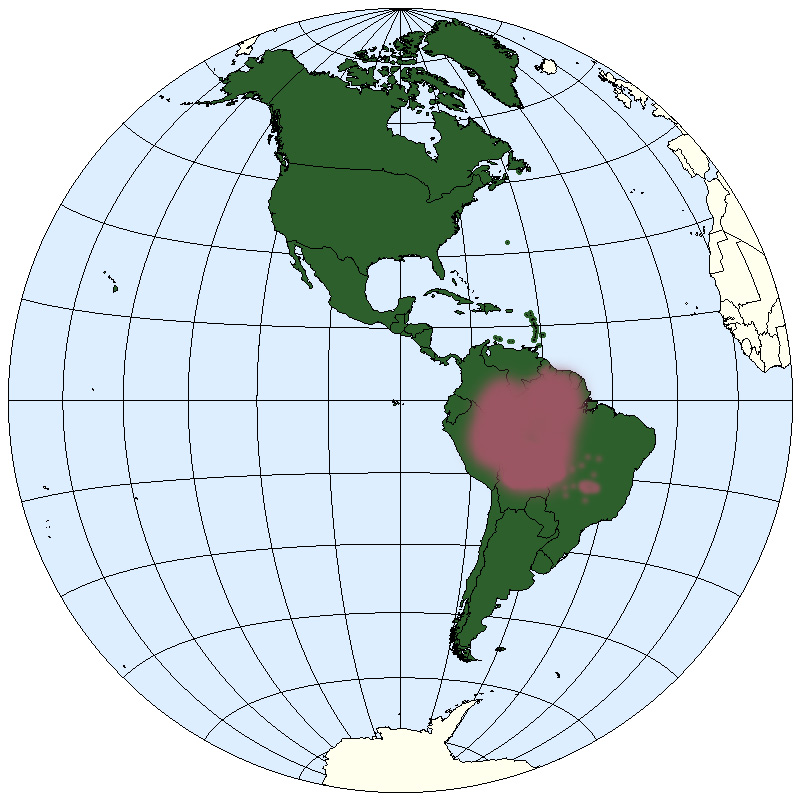

Synonyms
- Rana bicolor Boddaert, 1772; Hyla bicolor (Boddaert, 1772)

= Phyllomedusa bicolor =

Species of amphibian

Phyllomedusa bicolor, the giant leaf frog, bicolor tree-frog, giant monkey frog, or waxy-monkey treefrog, is a species of leaf frog. It can be found in the Amazon basin of Brazil, Colombia (Amazonas), Bolivia, and Peru, and can also be found in the Guianan Region of Venezuela and the Guianas, and in Cerrado of the state of Maranhão in Brazil.

== Description ==
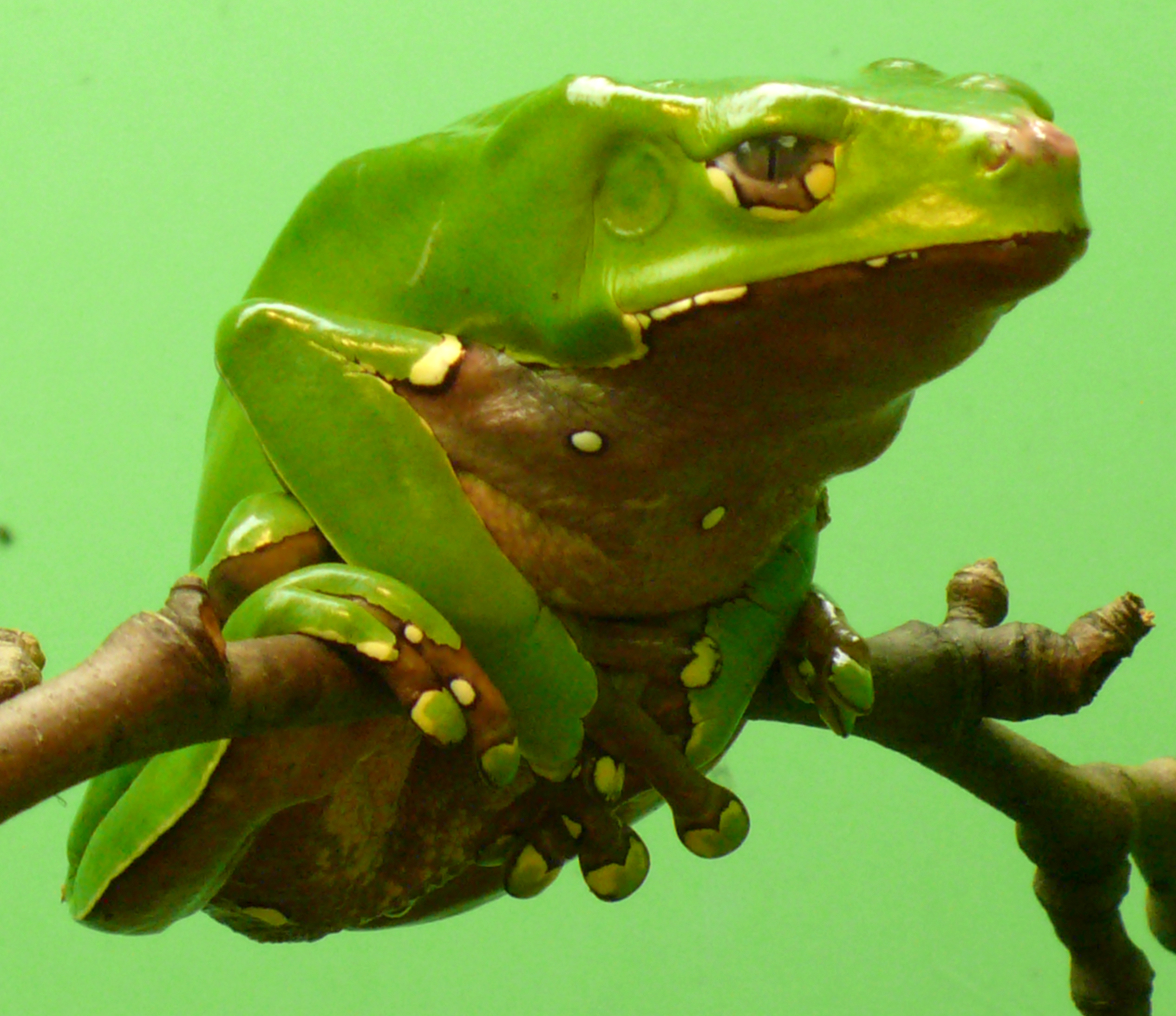
P. bicolor

Males measure 91–103 mm (3.6–4.1 in) and females 111–119 mm (4.4–4.7 in) in snout–vent length. The dorsum is lime green whereas the belly is white to yellow-white or cream. Lower lips, chest and front legs bear sparse white spots with dark frames; these are more dense on the flanks and hind legs. Fingers are transparent brown and have large, green adhesive discs. There is a prominent gland extending from behind each eye over the tympanum. The iris is dark gray.

== Distribution and habitat ==
It is found throughout the Amazon rainforest in Bolivia, the Guianas, Brazil, Colombia, Venezuela, and Peru. This frog has been found in gallery forest.

== Ecology and behaviour ==
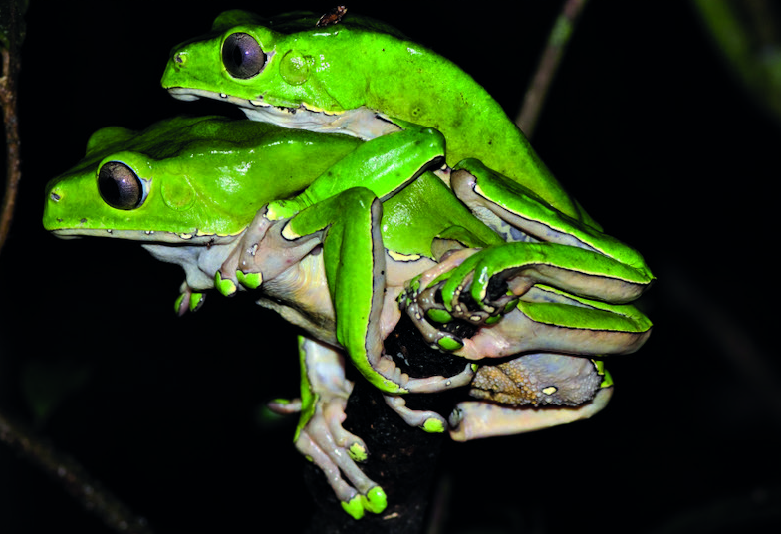
Amplexus. Amapá, Brazil

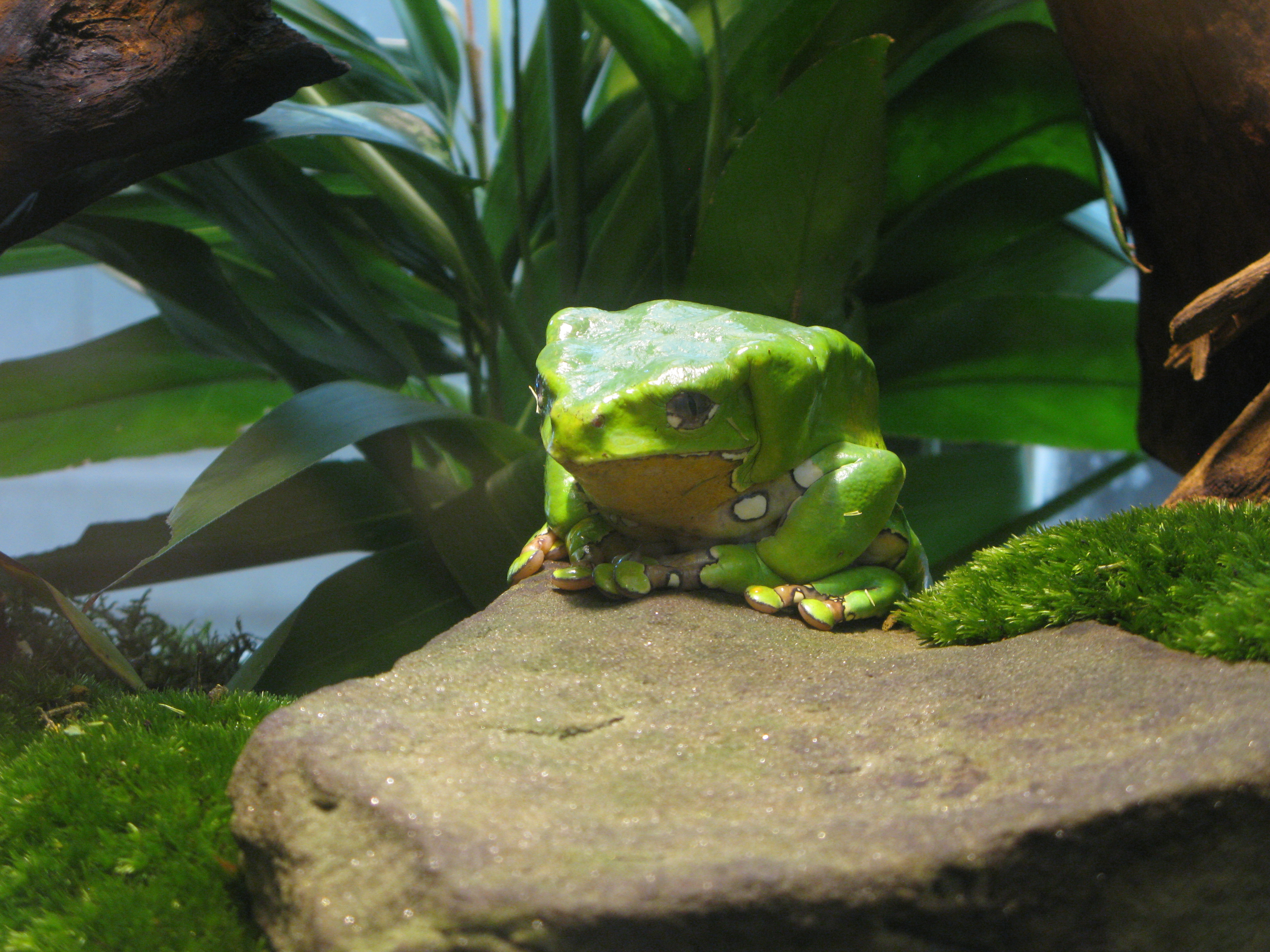
A giant leaf frog seated.

The giant leaf frog is a nocturnal, arboreal frog. Males call from trees in tropical humid forests. Males fight each other for mating rights by using their heads to attempt to separate another male who is attached to a female. Males fend off rivals using a series of aggressive calls and use their hind legs to push away the rival. During mating season, males may be targeted more by predators as the fights between males are very vocal and can be easily heard by predators. However, to combat this, giant leaf frogs produce peptides in their skin that serves as a chemical defence. Giant leaf frogs reproduce like most frog species through amplexus, where the male climbs onto the female's back to fertilize the eggs. The female and male construct a leaf-nest above forest pools, where the eggs are laid in a gelatinous mass of about 70 cm above the water. The eggs hatch from these nests in approximately 14 days, and the tadpoles fall into the water, where they continue the development into adult frogs. Peak reproduction occurs during the rainy season. Eggs of the giant leaf frog are heavily predated and have a predation rate of up to 61%. Species that prey on the eggs include rove beetles, phorid flies, mammals – possibly tufted capuchins– and other predators, such as banded cat-eyed snakes. The eggs are predated because they are source of protein for predators.

== Conservation ==
The IUCN endangered species database lists them in the "Least Concern" category, in view of their current wide distribution and large population.

== Medicinal use ==
The skin secretion of the giant leaf frog is known as Vacina do sapo (frog vaccine) and contains the opioid peptides deltorphin, deltorphin I, deltorphin II and dermorphin. The secretion, known as Kambo or Sapo, has seen increasing popularity in cleansing rituals, where it induces intense vomiting.
