= Hops and cannabinoids =

Relation between Humulus lupulus and Cannabis sativa

Research has shown that Humulus lupulus (the plant that makes hops) and Cannabis sativa (also called hemp and marijuana) are closely related, (Note: See also subsection titled "The incredibly parallel histories of cannabis and its closest relative, humulus (hop)" in Small (2016)) and it may be possible to create novel cultivars of hops that express valuable chemicals similar to commercial hemp. Both hops and cannabis contain terpenes and terpenoids; tetrahydrocannabinol (THC) is a terpenoid. Hops lack the enzyme that could convert cannabigerolic acid into THC or CBD, but it could be inserted using genetic engineering as was done in 2019 for yeast.

== See also ==
- Humulus § Hops chemistry and pharmacology
