= Collybolide =

Names
- Systematic IUPAC name (3S,4R,4aS,5R,8R,9aR)-4-(benzoyloxy)-3-(3-furanyl)hexahydro-5-methyl-5,8-Methano-1H-pyrano[3,4-d]oxepin-1,6(5H)-dione
- Other names: (+)-Collybolide

Identifiers
CAS Number	33340-30-6
3D model (JSmol)	Interactive image; Interactive image
ChemSpider	9627099
PubChem CID	72966961
- InChI: InChI=1S/C22H20O7/c1-22-10-14(27-21(22)25)9-15-16(22)18(29-19(23)12-5-3-2-4-6-12)17(28-20(15)24)13-7-8-26-11-13/h2-8,11,14-18H,9-10H2,1H3/t14-,15-,16-,17+,18-,22-/m1/s1 Key: JLFUOYRQSZADHD-NVKOURDFSA-N; InChI=1S/C22H20O7/c1-22-10-14(27-21(22)25)9-15-16(22)18(29-19(23)12-5-3-2-4-6-12)17(28-20(15)24)13-7-8-26-11-13/h2-8,11,14-18H,9-10H2,1H3 Key: JLFUOYRQSZADHD-UHFFFAOYSA-N
- SMILES: O(C(=O)C1=CC=CC=C1)[C@@H]2[C@@]3([C@@]4(C)C[C@@H](C[C@]3(C(=O)O[C@]2(C=5C=COC5)[H])[H])OC4=O)[H]; CC12CC(C(C3C1C(C(OC3=O)C4=COC=C4)OC(=O)C5=CC=CC=C5))OC2=O

Properties
Chemical formula	C_{22}H_{20}O_{7}
Molar mass	396.395 g·mol^{−1}
- Except where otherwise noted, data are given for materials in their standard state (at 25 °C [77 °F], 100 kPa). Infobox references

Collybolide is a secondary metabolite of the Rhodocollybia maculata mushroom, a basidiomycete fungus that grows on rotting conifer wood. It was previously believed to be a potent and selective kappa-opioid receptor agonist. However, a total synthesis and independent biological assay determined that collybolide neither excites nor suppresses kappa-opioid receptor signaling. Collybolide is unlikely to be psychoactive, although it has been shown to inhibit L-type calcium channels in isolated rat aorta.

== History ==
Collybolide was first isolated from R. maculata in 1911, but its structure remained unsolved until the 1970s, when X-ray crystallography yielded the structure of a collybolide epimer, isocollybolide, and ^{1}H and ^{13}C NMR elucidated the structure and relative stereochemistry of collybolide. Importantly, early reports were unable to confidently assign the absolute configuration of collybolide; a 1986 isolation of a collybolide congener noted that the absolute configuration of the series "remains to be determined", and a 2001 circular dichroism study was only able to tentatively infer which enantiomer naturally occurred based on density functional theory calculations. A 2016 report claimed to have conclusively assigned the absolute configuration of collybolide by X-ray crystallography, but a following 2022 report noted that the Flack parameter accompanying the 2016 crystal structure was inconclusive, and could not be used to confidently assign its absolute stereochemistry.

== Purported kappa-opioid receptor agonism ==
Collybolide is a sesquiterpene that contains a furyl-δ-lactone, a structural feature shared with the diterpene natural product salvinorin A. Salvinorin A is a hallucinogen that acts via high-potency agonism of the human kappa-opioid receptor (KOR), and collybolide's structural similarity to salvinorin A prompted a 2016 team to investigate collybolide's activity at the KOR, in the hopes of discovering a new, non-nitrogenous opioid. Radioligand displacement and functional assays showed collybolide binding to (K_{i} = 0.9 nM) and activating the human KOR, and an in vivo assay described collybolide inhibiting chloroquine-induced itch in mice at an extremely low dose (IC_{50} = 0.08 mg/kg). These results attracted widespread attention in the biomedical community, as collybolide appeared to be a potent and selective KOR agonist that might be developed into a new treatment for pain or pruritus, lacking the adverse effects of typical mu-opioid receptor agonist pain treatments.

Independent chemical synthesis and biological assay of collybolide in 2022 found that it was devoid of opioid activity. Radioligand displacement assays showed only weak (K_{i} = 794 nM) binding of collybolide to the human KOR, and functional assays showed that collybolide does not activate KOR signaling at concentrations up to 10 μM (measured by [^{35}S]GTPγS binding, cAMP accumulation, and beta-arrestin recruitment assays). Shevick et al. note the presence of surface-modifying agents in the 2016 assay procedures, in addition to low percent stimulation in the 2016 [^{35}S]GTPγS assay, that may have caused noise in the data to be mistaken as signal. The source of the false positive result for KOR agonism in the 2016 study has yet to be rigorously identified. However, the findings and conclusions of the 2022 study – that collybolide was incorrectly assigned as a KOR agonist – explain why no credible reports of collybolide's psychoactivity have surfaced.

== Chemical synthesis ==
The 2022 reevaluation of collybolide's KOR activity leveraged access to both natural and unnatural enantiomers of collybolide via total synthesis. Key features of the synthesis included an enantioselective Diels-Alder reaction using the Hayashi-Jørgensen proline organocatalyst, and an enamine [3,3]-sigmatropic rearrangement to stereoselectively install a late-stage benzoyloxy (BzO) group.

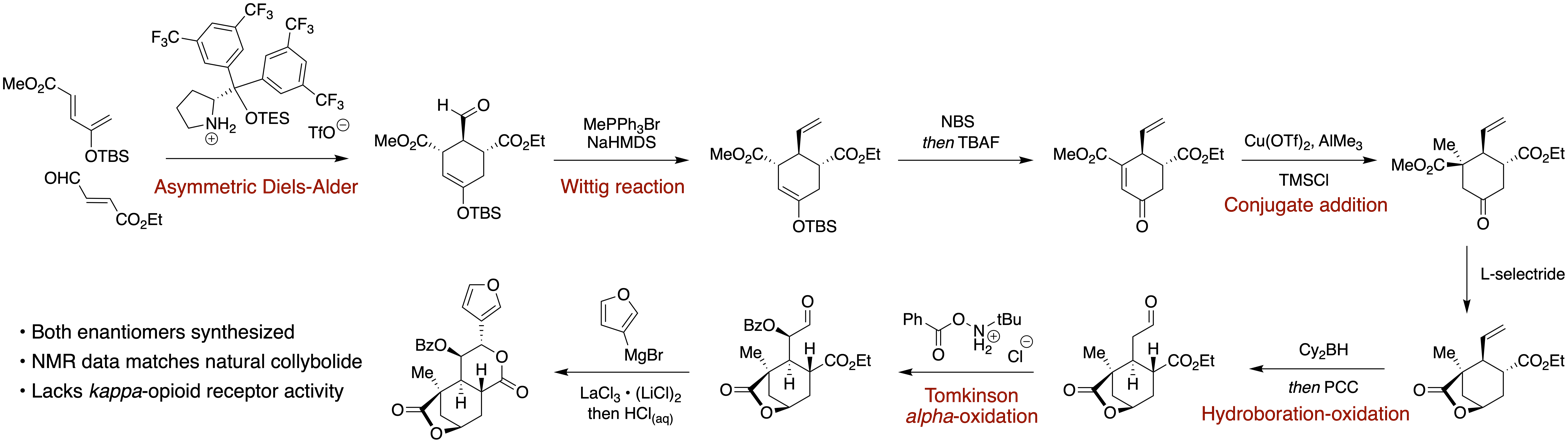
Total synthesis of collybolide (2022, Shevick et al.)
