= Biodiversity and drugs =

Biodiversity Is helpful

Biodiversity plays a vital role in maintaining human and animal health because numerous plants, animals, and fungi are used in medicine to produce vital vitamins, painkillers, antibiotics, and other medications. Natural products have been recognized and used as medicines by ancient cultures all around the world. Some animals are also known to self-medicate using plants and other materials available to them.

== Plant drugs ==
Many plant species have been studied thoroughly for their value as a source of medicine. They have a wide range of benefits such as anti-fever and anti-inflammatory properties, can treat diseases such as malaria and diabetes, and are used as vitamins and antibiotic and antifungal medications. More than 60% of the world's population relies almost entirely on plant medicine for primary health care, and about 119 pure chemicals such as caffeine, methyl salicylate, and quinine are extracted from less than 90 species of higher plants and used as medicines throughout the world.

In China, Japan, India, and Germany, there is a great deal of interest in and support for the search for new drugs from higher plants. For example, the Herbalome Project was launched in China in 2008 and aims to use high throughput sequencing and toxicity testing to identify active components in traditional herbal remedies.

=== Sweet Wormwood ===
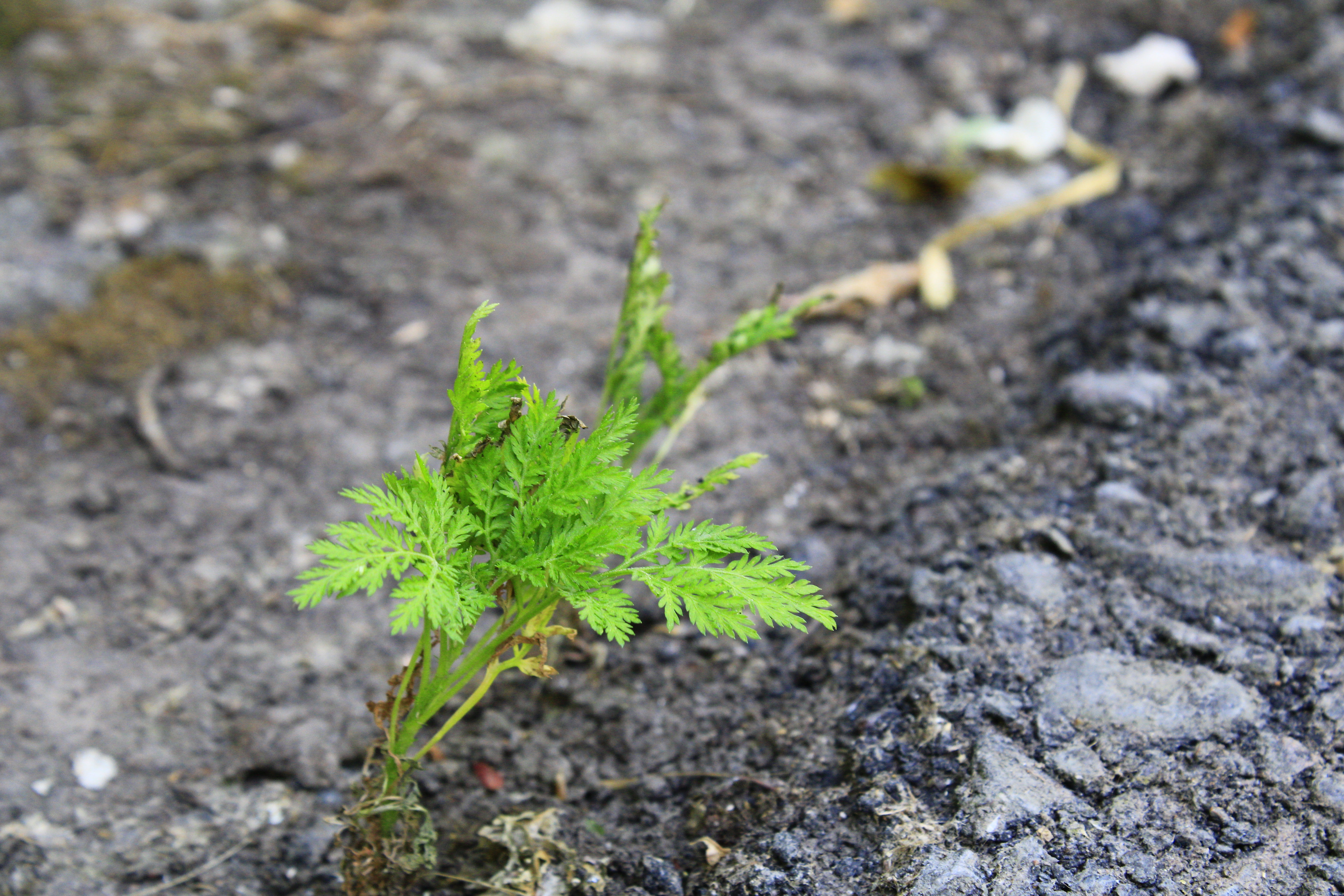
Sweet wormwood (Artemisia annua)

Sweet Wormwood (Artemisia annua) grows on all continents besides Antarctica. It is the only known source of artemisinin, a drug that has been used to treat fevers due to malaria, exhaustion, or many other causes, since ancient times. Upon further study, scientists have found that Sweet Wormwood inhibits activity of various bacteria, viruses, and parasites and exhibits anti-cancer and anti-inflammatory properties.

== Animal-derived drugs ==
Animal-derived drugs are a major source of modern medications used around the world. The use of these drugs can cause certain animals to become endangered or threatened; however, it is difficult to identify the animal species used in medicine since animal-derived drugs are often processed, which degrades their DNA.

=== Medicinal Animal Horns and Shells ===
Cells from animal horns and shells are included in a group of medications call Medicinal Animal Horns and Shells (MAHS). These drugs are often used in dermatology and have been reported to have anti-fever and anti-inflammatory properties and treat some diseases.

=== Drugs derived from animal toxins ===
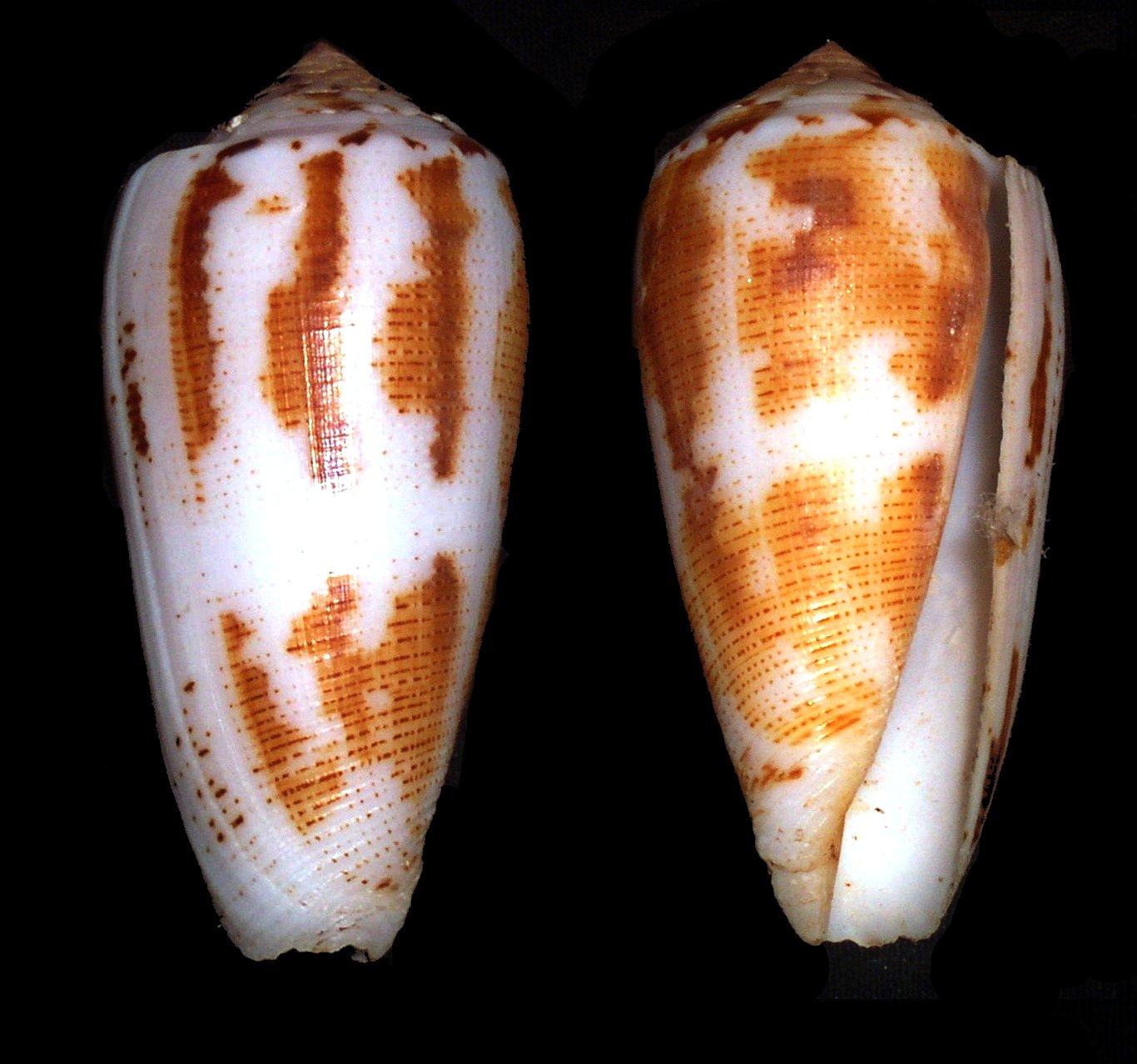
The shell of a cone snail (Conus magus).

Certain animals have obtained many adaptations of toxic substances due to a coevolutionary arms race between them and their predators. Some components of these toxins such as enzymes and inorganic salts are used in modern medicine. For example, drugs such as Captopril and Lisinopril are derived from snake venom and inhibit the angiotensin-converting enzyme. Another example is Ziconotide, a drug from the cone snail, Conus magus, that is used to reduce pain.

== Medicinal fungi ==
Edible fungi can contain important nutrients and biomolecules that can be used for medical applications. For example, medicinal fungi have polysaccharides that can be used to prevent the spread of cancer by activating different types of immune cells (namely T lymphocytes, macrophages, and NK cells), which inhibit cancer cell reproduction and metastasis (the process by which cancer can spread to different parts of the body).

Fungi have been used to make many antibiotics since Sir Alexander Flemming discovered Penicillin from the mold, Penicillium notatum. Recently, there has been a renewed interest in using fungi to create antibiotics since many bacteria have obtained antibiotic resistance due to the heavy selection pressures that antibiotics cause. The diversity of marine fungi makes them a potential new source of antibiotic compounds; however, most are difficult to cultivate in a laboratory setting.

Countries in Asia such as Egypt and China have been using fungi for medical uses for centuries.

=== Turkey Tail Mushrooms ===
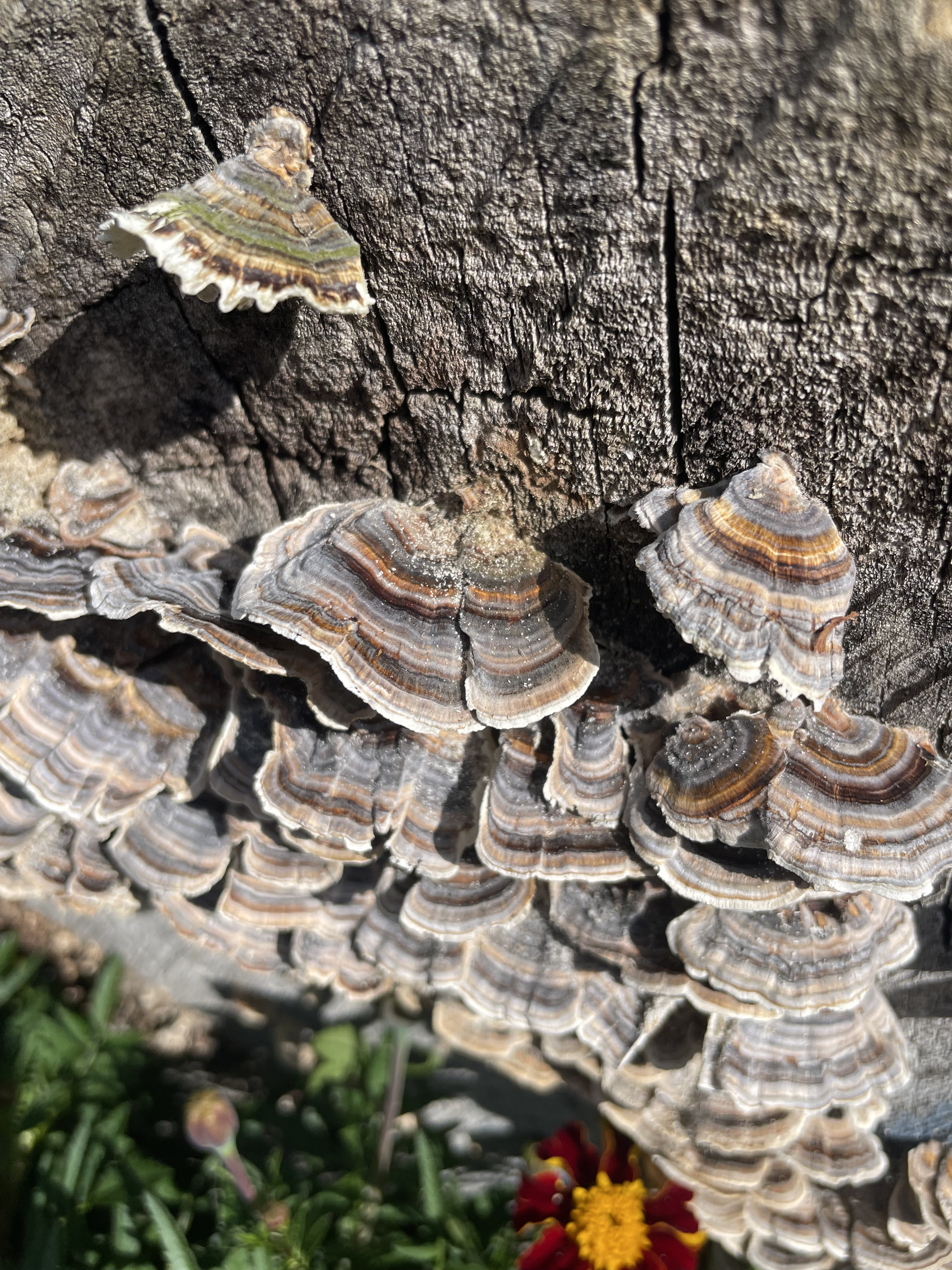
Turkey tail mushrooms found in Georgia, USA.

Toxoplasmosis is a disease caused by an infection by the parasite: Toxoplasma gondii (T. gondii). Current drugs used to treat this disease have many side effects and do not inhibit all forms of T. gondii. An in vitro study by Sharma et al. suggests that Turkey Tail mushroom extract could be used to treat Toxoplasmosis since it inhibited T. gondii growth.

=== Pestalone ===
Pestalone is an antibiotic created from the marine fungus: Pestalotia sp. M. Cueto et al. (2001–11) found that it has antibiotic activity against two bacteria species that have gained resistance to antibiotics: vancomycin-resistant Enterococcus faecium and methicillin-resistant Staphylococcus aureus.

== Zoopharmacognosy ==
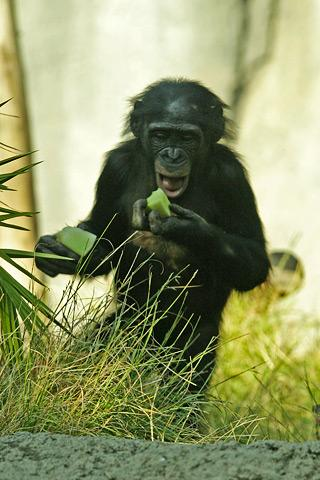
Apes and monkeys are an example of animals using plants as medicine rather than food.

Zoopharmacognosy is the study of how animals select certain plants as self-medication to treat or prevent disease. Usually, this behavior is a result of coevolution between the animal and the plant that it uses for self-medication. For example, apes have been observed selecting a particular part of a medicinal plant by taking off leaves and breaking the stem to suck out the juice. In an interview with the late Neil Campbell, Eloy Rodriguez describes the importance of biodiversity:

"Some of the compounds we've identified by zoopharmacognosy kill parasitic worms, and some of these chemicals may be useful against tumors. There is no question that the templates for most drugs are in the natural world."
