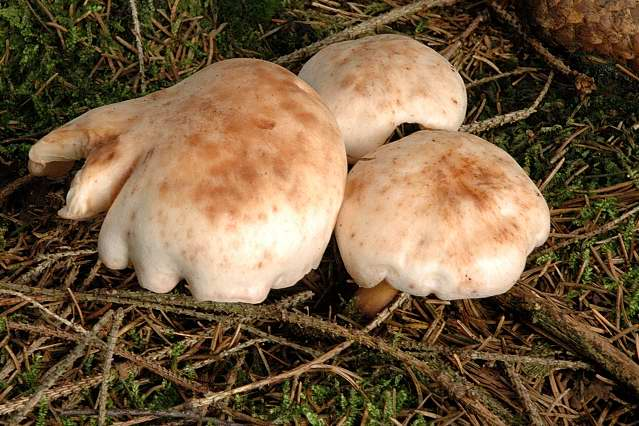

Scientific classification
- Kingdom: Fungi
- Division: Basidiomycota
- Class: Agaricomycetes
- Order: Agaricales
- Family: Omphalotaceae
- Genus: Rhodocollybia
- Species: R. maculata

Binomial name
- Rhodocollybia maculata (Alb. & Schwein.: Fr.) Singer

Synonyms
- Collybia maculata

= Rhodocollybia maculata =

Species of fungus

Rhodocollybia maculata
- Mycological characteristics
- Gills on hymenium
- Cap is convex or flat
- Hymenium is adnexed
- Stipe is bare
- Spore print is pink to cream
- Ecology is saprotrophic
- Edibility is edible, but unpalatable

Rhodocollybia maculata, commonly known as the spotted toughshank, is a species of basidiomycete fungus in the family Omphalotaceae. R. maculata is a source of collybolide, a sesquiterpenoid containing a furyl-ẟ-lactone motif reminiscent of salvinorin A.

== Description ==
The cap is up to 9 centimetres (3 1/2 in) wide and cream-colored with red-brown spots. The edge remains inrolled for an extended period of time. The whitish gills are crowded, becoming spotted in age. The similarly colored stipe is up to 10 cm long, tough, hollow, and tapered downwards. The spore print is whitish to yellowish.

A variety known as scorzonerea is characterized by yellowish color of its gills, and sometimes the stipe.

== Distribution and habitat ==
It is widespread in North America. It often appears in decomposing conifer duff.

== Edibility ==
Though non-toxic, this species is considered inedible due to its toughness and unpalatability; it is typically bitter.

== Kappa-opioid receptor agonism ==
In 2016, Gupta et al. reported that collybolide exhibited high-potency, selective kappa-opioid receptor (KOR) agonism. Due to its attractive bioactivity and chemical similarity to salvinorin A, collybolide garnered attention in the synthetic chemistry and pharmacology fields as a potential scaffold for developing next-generation analgesics, antipruritics, and antidepressants.

In 2022, Shevick et al. completed the first enantioselective total synthesis of collybolide and profiled the activity of synthetic collybolide at the KOR. Despite previous findings by Gupta et al., these assays showed that neither enantiomer of collybolide had KOR activity. The synthetic sample was identical to natural collybolide isolated from R. maculata. Assays of crude R. maculata extracts by other groups additionally showed no KOR activity. (Note: See page 150 of the Supporting Information of Shevick et al. for reports on the kappa-opioid receptor assays with crude R. maculata extracts.) These assays of synthetic and natural samples contradict the findings of Gupta et al., and suggest that collybolide and the other constituents of R. maculata have no activity at KOR.

== Gallery ==
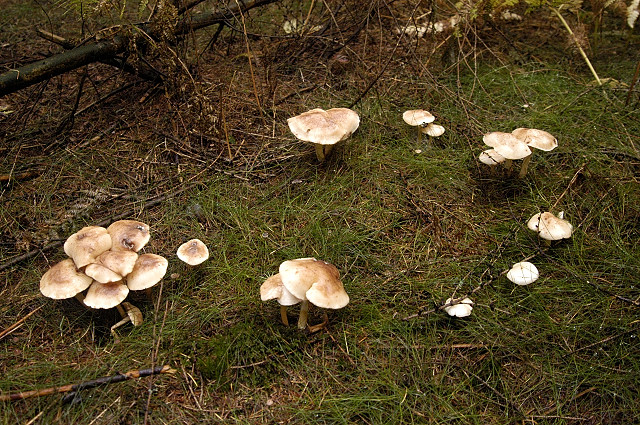

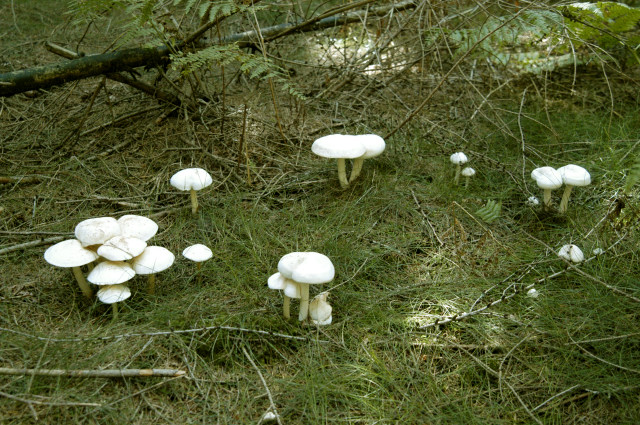

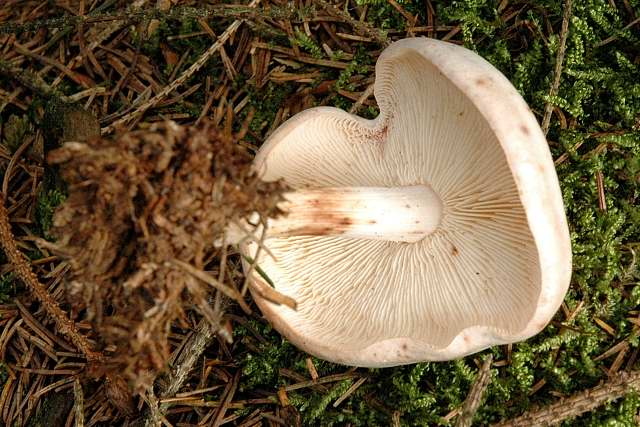
