= Deltorphin =

Names
- IUPAC names (3S)-3-[(2S)-2-[(2S)-2-[(2S)-2-[(2S)-2-[(2R)-2-[(2S)-2-amino-3-(4-hydroxyphenyl)propanamido]-4-(methylsulfanyl)butanamido]-3-phenylpropanamido]-3-(1H-imidazol-4-yl)propanamido]-4-methylpentanamido]-4-(methylsulfanyl)butanamido]-3-carbamoylpropanoic acid or L-tyrosyl-D-methionyl-L-phenylalanyl-L-histidyl-L-leucyl-L-methionyl-L-α-asparagine
- Other names Deltorphin A; Dermenkephalin

Identifiers
CAS Number	119975-64-3
3D model (JSmol)	Interactive image
ChemSpider	2299380
PubChem CID	3035060
CompTox Dashboard (EPA)	DTXSID60152630
- InChI: InChI=1S/C44H62N10O10S2/c1-25(2)18-34(42(62)50-32(15-17-66-4)40(60)51-33(38(46)58)22-37(56)57)52-44(64)36(21-28-23-47-24-48-28)54-43(63)35(20-26-8-6-5-7-9-26)53-41(61)31(14-16-65-3)49-39(59)30(45)19-27-10-12-29(55)13-11-27/h5-13,23-25,30-36,55H,14-22,45H2,1-4H3,(H2,46,58)(H,47,48)(H,49,59)(H,50,62)(H,51,60)(H,52,64)(H,53,61)(H,54,63)(H,56,57)/t30-,31+,32-,33-,34-,35-,36-/m0/s1 Key: BHSURCCZOBVHJJ-NWOHMYAQSA-N; InChI=1/C44H62N10O10S2/c1-25(2)18-34(42(62)50-32(15-17-66-4)40(60)51-33(38(46)58)22-37(56)57)52-44(64)36(21-28-23-47-24-48-28)54-43(63)35(20-26-8-6-5-7-9-26)53-41(61)31(14-16-65-3)49-39(59)30(45)19-27-10-12-29(55)13-11-27/h5-13,23-25,30-36,55H,14-22,45H2,1-4H3,(H2,46,58)(H,47,48)(H,49,59)(H,50,62)(H,51,60)(H,52,64)(H,53,61)(H,54,63)(H,56,57)/t30-,31+,32-,33-,34-,35-,36-/m0/s1 Key: BHSURCCZOBVHJJ-NWOHMYAQBV
- SMILES: O=C(O)C[C@@H](C(=O)N)NC(=O)[C@@H](NC(=O)[C@@H](NC(=O)[C@@H](NC(=O)[C@@H](NC(=O)[C@H](NC(=O)[C@@H](N)Cc1ccc(O)cc1)CCSC)Cc2ccccc2)Cc3c[nH]cn3)CC(C)C)CCSC

Properties
Chemical formula	C_{44}H_{62}N_{10}O_{10}S_{2}
Molar mass	955.154 g/mol
- Except where otherwise noted, data are given for materials in their standard state (at 25 °C [77 °F], 100 kPa). Infobox references

Deltorphin, also known as deltorphin A and dermenkephalin, is a naturally occurring, exogenous opioid heptapeptide and thus, exorphin, with the amino acid sequence Tyr-D-Met-Phe-His-Leu-Met-Asp-NH_{2}. Along with the other deltorphins (such as deltorphin I and deltorphin II) and the dermorphins, deltorphin is endogenous to frogs of the genus Phyllomedusa such as P. bicolor and P. sauvagei where it is produced in their skin, and is not known to occur naturally in any other species. Deltorphin is one of the highest affinity and most selective naturally occurring opioid peptides known, acting as a very potent and highly specific agonist of the δ-opioid receptor.

Deltorphins have an unusually high blood–brain barrier penetration rate. The nonselective opiate antagonist naloxone inhibits deltorphin uptake by brain microvessels, but neither the selective δ-opioid antagonist naltrindole nor a number of opioid peptides with different affinities for δ- or μ-opioid receptors compete with deltorphins for the transport.

== See also ==
- Deltorphin I
- Dermorphin
