= Deltorphin I =

Names
- IUPAC names (3S)-3-[(2S)-2-[(2R)-2-[(2S)-2-amino-3-(4-hydroxyphenyl)propanamido]propanamido]-3-phenylpropanamido]-3-{[(1S)-1-{[(1S)-1-[(carbamoylmethyl)carbamoyl]-2-methylpropyl]carbamoyl}-2-methylpropyl]carbamoyl}propanoic acid or L-tyrosyl-D-alanyl-L-phenylalanyl-L-α-aspartyl-L-valyl-L-valylglycinamide
- Other names [D-Ala^{2}]Deltorphin I; Deltorphin C

Identifiers
CAS Number	122752-15-2
3D model (JSmol)	Interactive image
ChEMBL	ChEMBL317956
ChemSpider	8231517
PubChem CID	10055958
CompTox Dashboard (EPA)	DTXSID10153692
- InChI: InChI=1S/C37H52N8O10/c1-19(2)30(36(54)40-18-28(39)47)45-37(55)31(20(3)4)44-35(53)27(17-29(48)49)43-34(52)26(16-22-9-7-6-8-10-22)42-32(50)21(5)41-33(51)25(38)15-23-11-13-24(46)14-12-23/h6-14,19-21,25-27,30-31,46H,15-18,38H2,1-5H3,(H2,39,47)(H,40,54)(H,41,51)(H,42,50)(H,43,52)(H,44,53)(H,45,55)(H,48,49)/t21-,25+,26+,27+,30+,31+/m1/s1 Key: CJAORFIPPWIGPG-QXYJMILXSA-N; InChI=1/C37H52N8O10/c1-19(2)30(36(54)40-18-28(39)47)45-37(55)31(20(3)4)44-35(53)27(17-29(48)49)43-34(52)26(16-22-9-7-6-8-10-22)42-32(50)21(5)41-33(51)25(38)15-23-11-13-24(46)14-12-23/h6-14,19-21,25-27,30-31,46H,15-18,38H2,1-5H3,(H2,39,47)(H,40,54)(H,41,51)(H,42,50)(H,43,52)(H,44,53)(H,45,55)(H,48,49)/t21-,25+,26+,27+,30+,31+/m1/s1 Key: CJAORFIPPWIGPG-QXYJMILXBS
- SMILES: O=C(N)CNC(=O)[C@@H](NC(=O)[C@@H](NC(=O)[C@@H](NC(=O)[C@@H](NC(=O)[C@H](NC(=O)[C@@H](N)Cc1ccc(O)cc1)C)Cc2ccccc2)CC(=O)O)C(C)C)C(C)C

Properties
Chemical formula	C_{37}H_{52}N_{8}O_{10}
Molar mass	768.856 g/mol
- Except where otherwise noted, data are given for materials in their standard state (at 25 °C [77 °F], 100 kPa). Infobox references

Deltorphin I, also known as [D-Ala^{2}]deltorphin I or deltorphin C, is a naturally occurring, exogenous opioid heptapeptide and hence, exorphin, with the amino acid sequence Tyr-D-Ala-Phe-Asp-Val-Val-Gly-NH_{2}. While not known to be endogenous to humans or other mammals, deltorphin I, along with the other deltorphins and the dermorphins, is produced naturally in the skin of species of Phyllomedusa, a genus of frogs native to South and Central America. Deltorphin possesses very high affinity and selectivity as an agonist for the δ-opioid receptor, and on account of its unusually high blood-brain-barrier penetration rate, produces centrally-mediated analgesic effects in animals even when administered peripherally.

== See also ==
- Deltorphin
- Dermorphin
