= Dermorphin =

Opioid agonist peptide compound

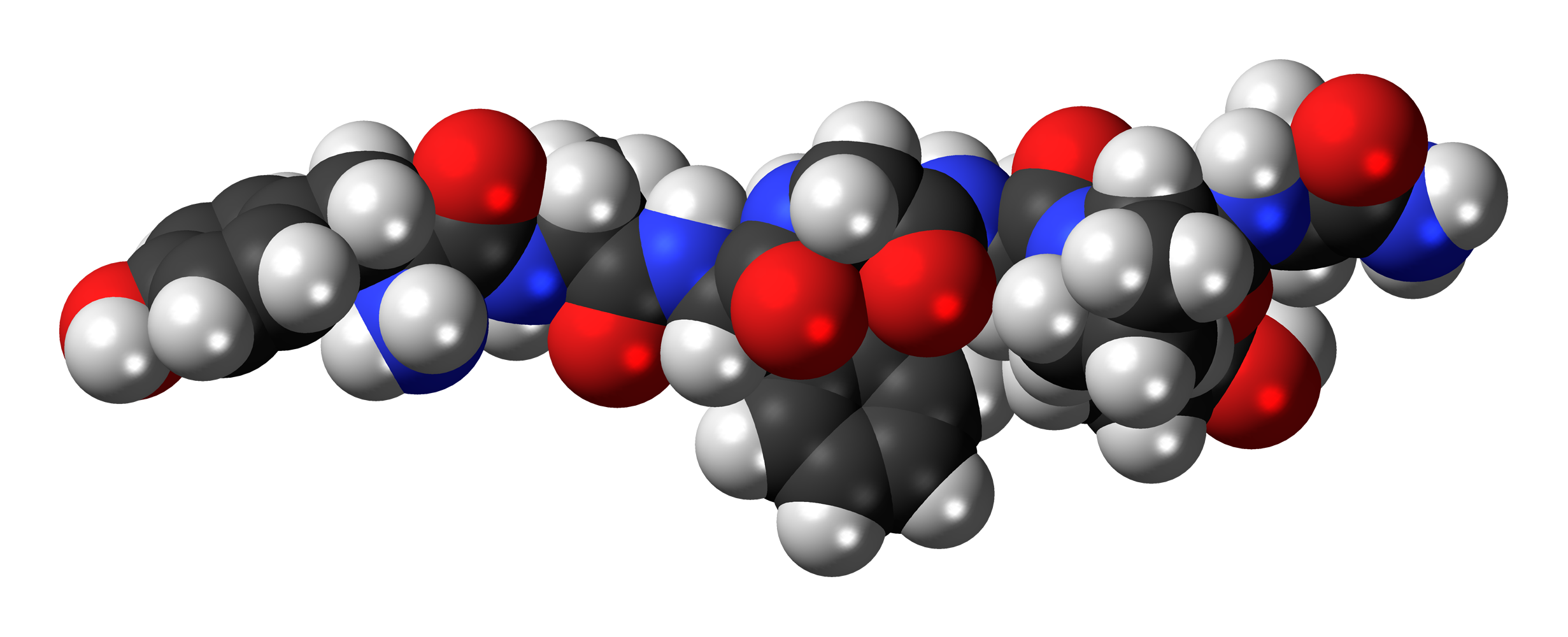

Identifiers
| CAS Number | 77614-16-5 |
| 3D model (JSmol) | Interactive image |
| ChEMBL | ChEMBL278789 |
| ChemSpider | 4588650 |
| PubChem CID | 5485199 |
| UNII | 2SEC01B703 |
| CompTox Dashboard (EPA) | DTXSID40228281 |
- InChI: InChI=1S/C40H50N8O10/c1-23(44-37(55)29(41)18-25-9-13-27(50)14-10-25)36(54)46-30(19-24-6-3-2-4-7-24)38(56)43-21-34(52)45-31(20-26-11-15-28(51)16-12-26)40(58)48-17-5-8-33(48)39(57)47-32(22-49)35(42)53/h2-4,6-7,9-16,23,29-33,49-51H,5,8,17-22,41H2,1H3,(H2,42,53)(H,43,56)(H,44,55)(H,45,52)(H,46,54)(H,47,57)/t23-,29+,30+,31+,32+,33+/m1/s1 Key: FHZPGIUBXYVUOY-VWGYHWLBSA-N; InChI=1/C40H50N8O10/c1-23(44-37(55)29(41)18-25-9-13-27(50)14-10-25)36(54)46-30(19-24-6-3-2-4-7-24)38(56)43-21-34(52)45-31(20-26-11-15-28(51)16-12-26)40(58)48-17-5-8-33(48)39(57)47-32(22-49)35(42)53/h2-4,6-7,9-16,23,29-33,49-51H,5,8,17-22,41H2,1H3,(H2,42,53)(H,43,56)(H,44,55)(H,45,52)(H,46,54)(H,47,57)/t23-,29+,30+,31+,32+,33+/m1/s1 Key: FHZPGIUBXYVUOY-VWGYHWLBBR
- SMILES: C[C@H](C(=O)N[C@@H](CC1=CC=CC=C1)C(=O)NCC(=O)N[C@@H](CC2=CC=C(C=C2)O)C(=O)N3CCC[C@H]3C(=O)N[C@@H](CO)C(=O)N)NC(=O)[C@H](CC4=CC=C(C=C4)O)N

Properties
| Chemical formula | C_{40}H_{50}N_{8}O_{10} |
| Molar mass | 802.886 g·mol^{−1} |
- Except where otherwise noted, data are given for materials in their standard state (at 25 °C [77 °F], 100 kPa). verify (what is ?) Infobox references

Dermorphin is a hepta-peptide first isolated from the skin of South American frogs belonging to the genus Phyllomedusa. The peptide is an agonist with high potency and selectivity to mu opioid receptors. Dermorphin is about 30–40 times more potent than morphine. The amino acid sequence of dermorphin is H-Tyr-D-Ala-Phe-Gly-Tyr-Pro-Ser-NH_{2}.

Dermorphin is not found in humans or other mammals and similar D-amino acid containing peptides have only been found in bacteria, amphibians, and molluscs. Dermorphin appears to be made via the posttranslational modification of a precursor peptide by an amino acid isomerase. This unusual process is needed because the D-alanine in this peptide is not part of the standard genetic code.

== Illicit use ==
Dermorphin has been illegally used in horse racing as a performance-enhancing drug. Due to dermorphin's painkilling activity, horses treated with dermorphin may run harder than they would otherwise.

== See also ==
- AL-VI10
- CI5 (peptide)
- CyRL-QN15
- Deltorphin
- Deltorphin I
- KGOP01
- Ribosomally synthesized and post-translationally modified peptides
