= Cladonia megafurcata =

Scientific classification
- Domain: Eukaryota
- Kingdom: Fungi
- Division: Ascomycota
- Class: Lecanoromycetes
- Order: Lecanorales
- Family: Cladoniaceae
- Genus: Cladonia
- Species: C. megafurcata

Binomial name
- Cladonia megafurcata Aptroot (2022)

Species of lichen

Cladonia megafurcata is a species of fruticose (shrub-like) lichen in the family Cladoniaceae. It was discovered in the ecosystem of campos rupestres ('rupestrian grassland') in Minas Gerais, Brazil. This habitat, found at elevations of 1,200–1,400 m (3,900–4,600 ft), is characterised by grassy areas interspersed with rocks and rocky outcrops.

== Taxonomy ==
André Aptroot identified Cladonia megafurcata in 2022, distinguishing it from its close relative, Cladonia furcata, by its larger size and distinctive branching patterns. The species name megafurcata emphasises its large size and the wide-open axils of its branches, which are characteristic features of this species.

This species represents a notable deviation from the morphological variation typically observed in Cladonia furcata across Europe, showing wider basal branches and open, stellate (star-shaped) axils. According to the author, its description challenges the previously held belief that C. furcata is almost cosmopolitan, and suggests a need for further phylogenetic and morphological studies to clarify the classification and distribution of Cladonia species globally.

== Description ==
The thallus of Cladonia megafurcata is fruticose (shrub-like), with branches reaching up to 10 cm (4 in) in height. These branches have a basal width of 1–2 mm, expanding up to 3 mm at major branching points. The tips of the branches taper, are hollow, and have a pale greenish-grey colour mottled with pale greenish-brown, darkening to brown at the tips.

Squamules, small scale-like structures, are present mainly on the lower half of the thallus. These squamules are firm, minimally dissected, and have a pale greenish-gray upper surface with a white underside.

Chemical tests on the thallus reveal no UV light reaction and a positive red reaction to the P test, indicating the presence of fumarprotocetraric acid, a secondary metabolite common in some Cladonia species.

== Habitat and distribution ==
Cladonia megafurcata is found on soil and granite surfaces within the campo rupestre, a type of rupestrian grassland, at elevations between 1,200–1,400 m (3,900–4,600 ft). This ecosystem is characterised by grassy areas interspersed with rocks and rocky outcrops. These ecosystems are typically found in high-altitude regions or on rocky plateaus, where the soil is thin and nutrient-poor but well-drained. While currently known only from its type locality in Brazil, the author suggests a possibly more widespread distribution across South America.

== See also ==
- List of Cladonia species
