= Campos rupestres =

Subtropical ecoregion in Brazil

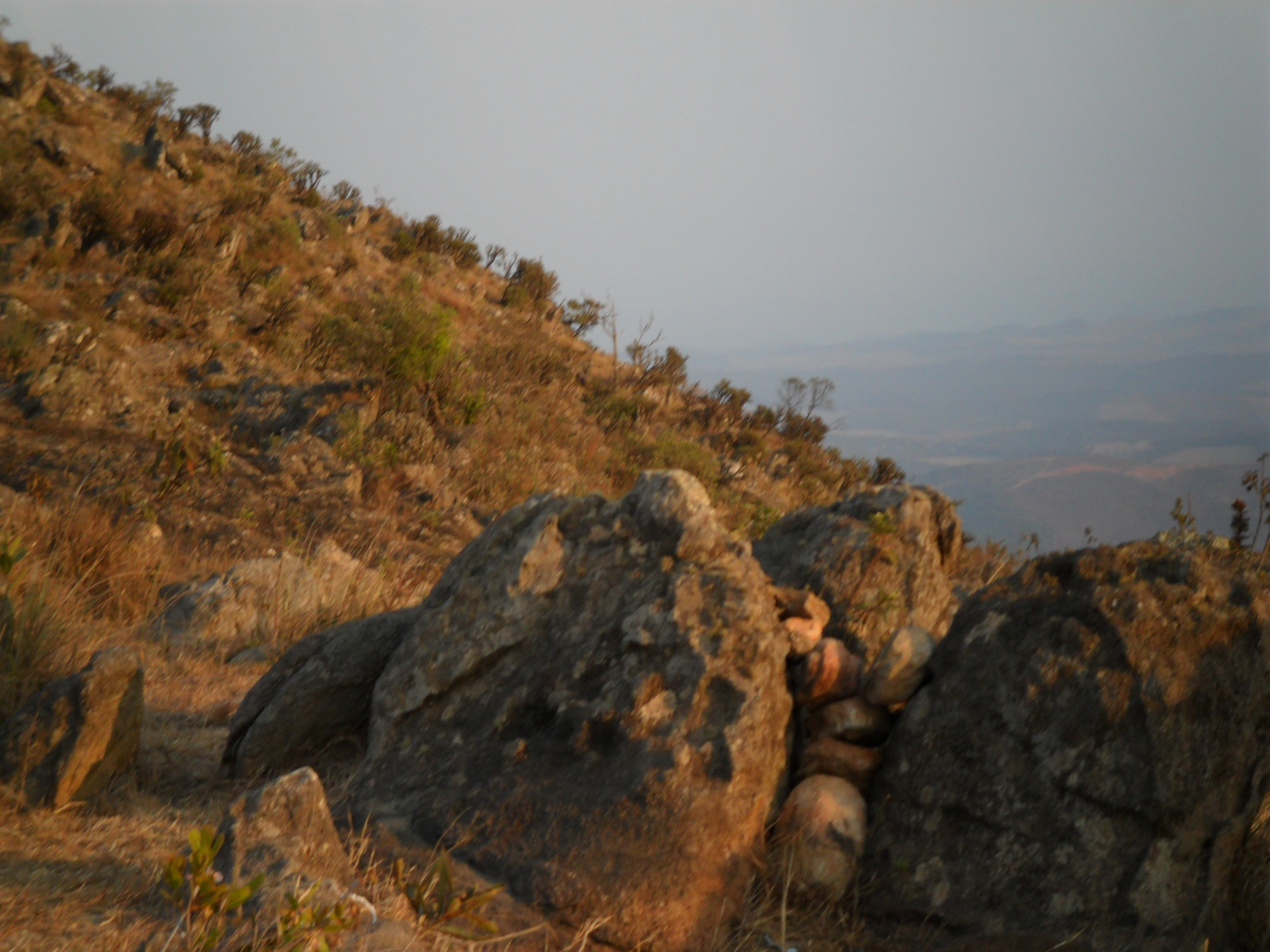
- Campos rupestres in Serra do Espinhaço, Brazil.

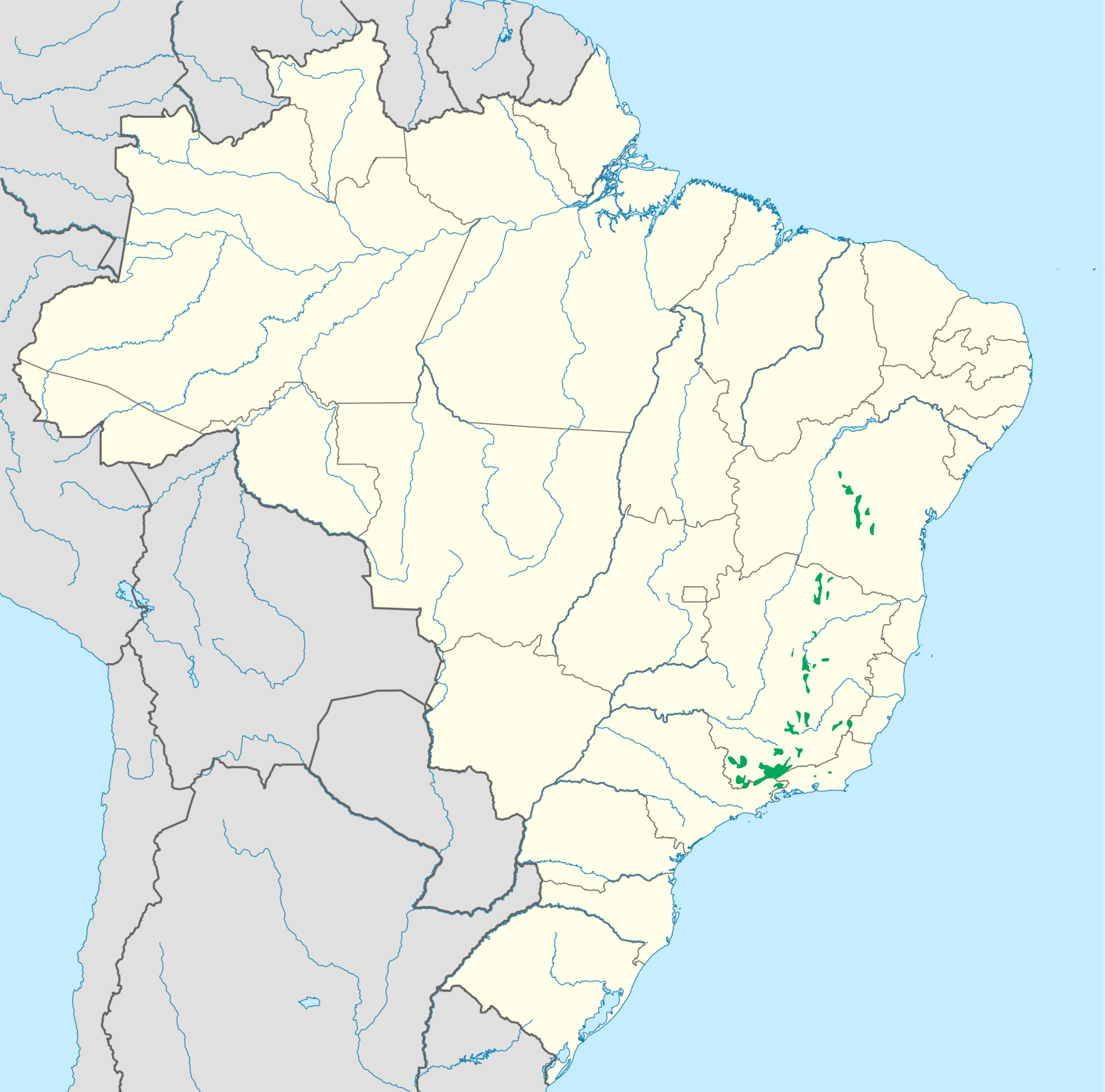

Ecology
- Realm: Neotropical
- Biome: Tropical and subtropical grasslands, savannas, and shrublands
- Borders: Bahia interior forests; Serra do Mar coastal forests; Cerrado; Caatinga

Geography
- Area: 26,417 km^{2} (10,200 mi^{2})
- Country: Brazil
- States: São Paulo; Minas Gerais; Rio de Janeiro; Espírito Santo; Bahia

Conservation
- Conservation status: Threatened
- Protected: 26.46%

The campo rupestre ("rupestrian grassland") is a discontinuous montane subtropical ecoregion occurring across three different biomes in Brazil: Cerrado, Atlantic Forest and Caatinga. Originally, campo rupestre was used to characterize the montane vegetation of the Espinhaço Range, but recently this term has been broadly applied by the scientific community to define high altitudinal fire-prone areas dominated by grasslands and rocky outcrops.

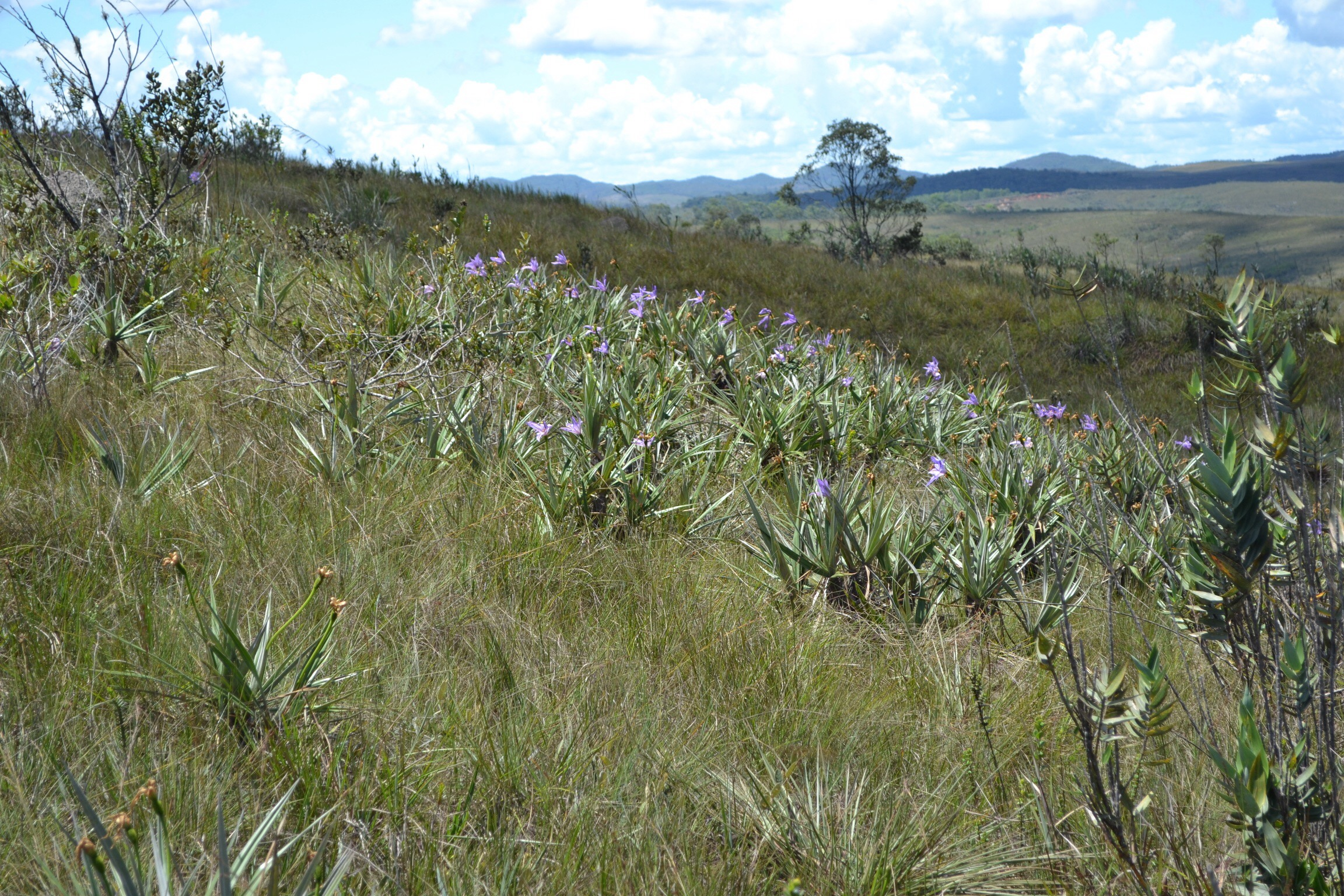
Photo depicting grassy vegetation typically occurring in the campo rupestre

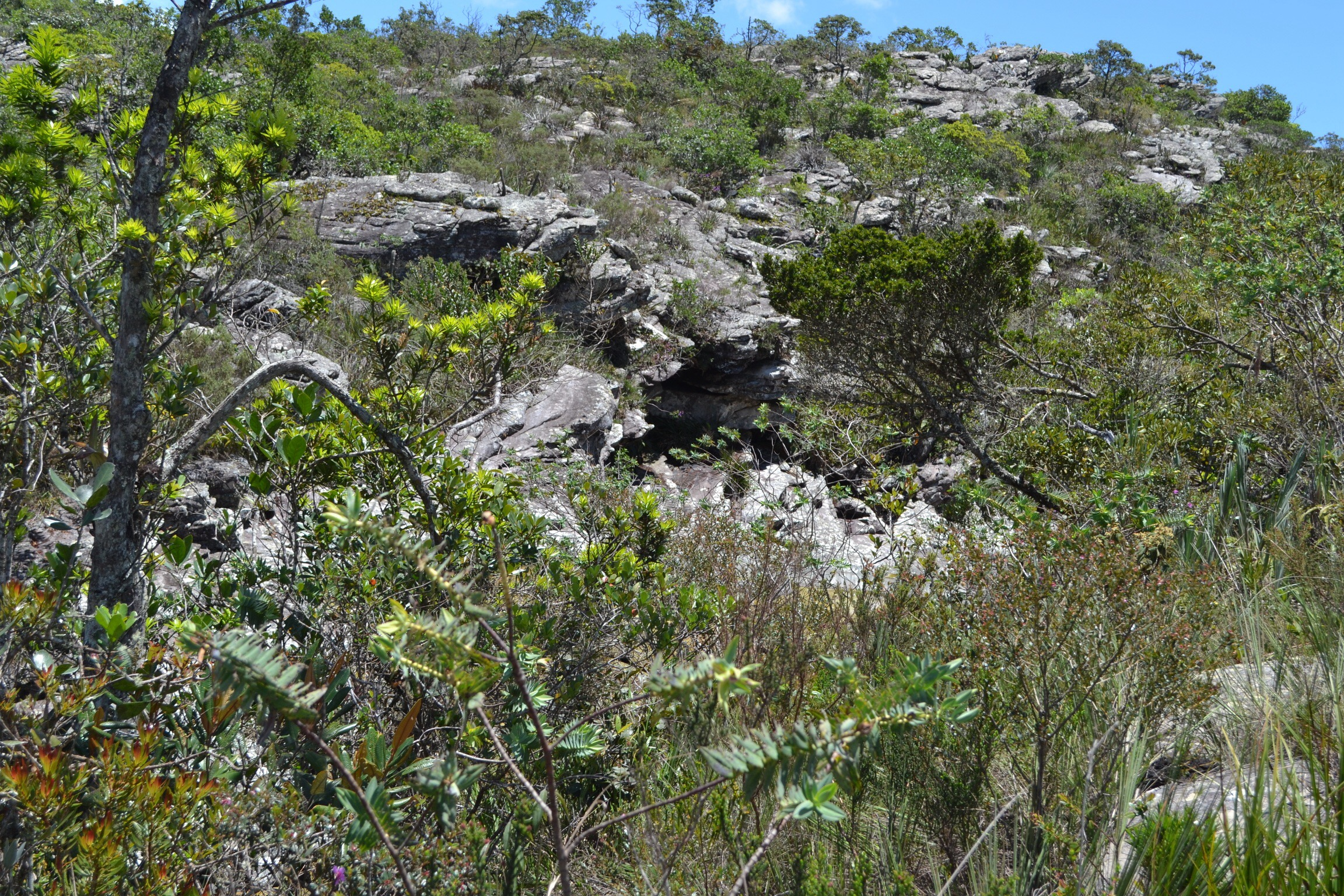
Picture depicting rocky vegetation typically occurring in the campo rupestre

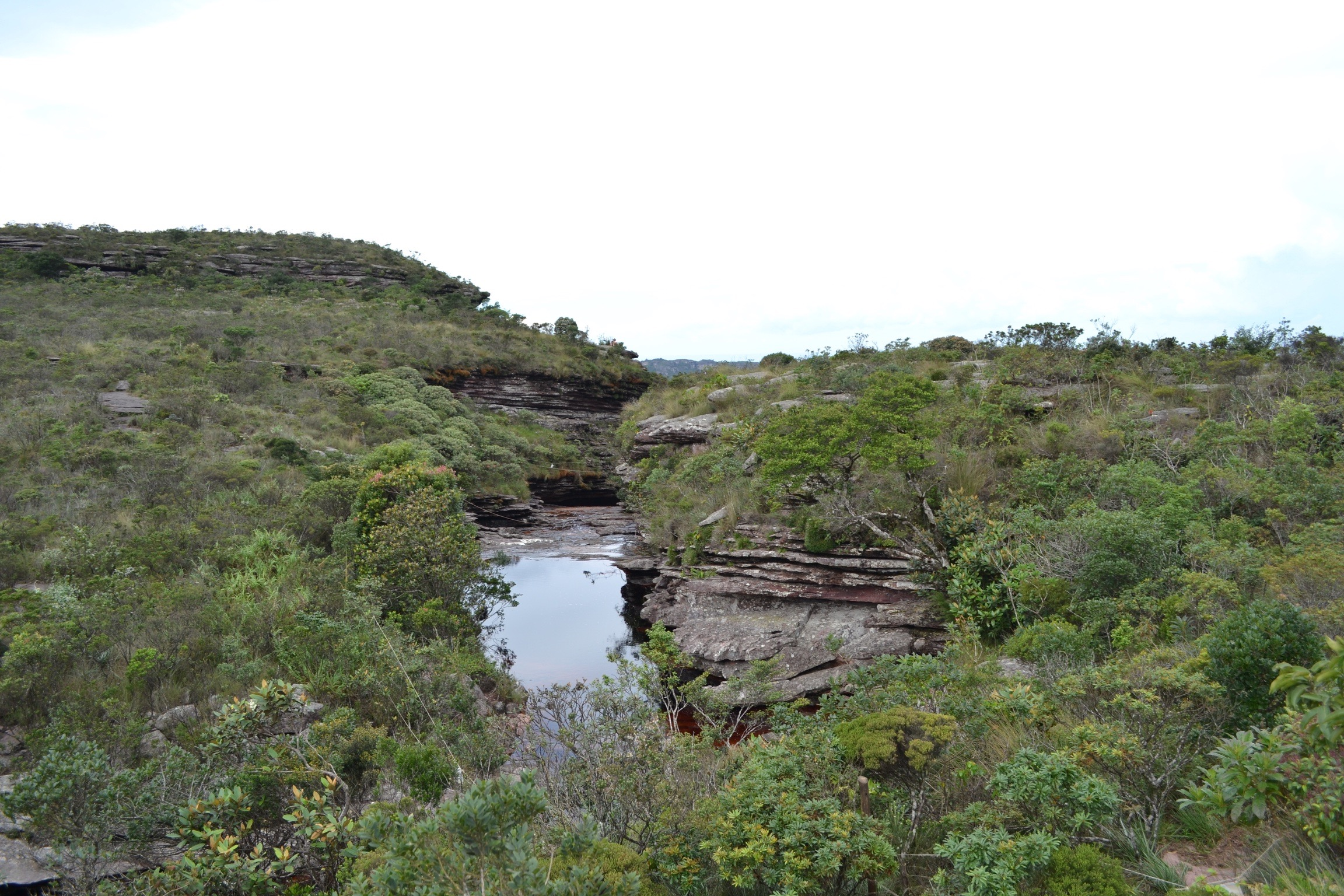
Photo showing the shrubby vegetation typically occurring in the campo rupestre

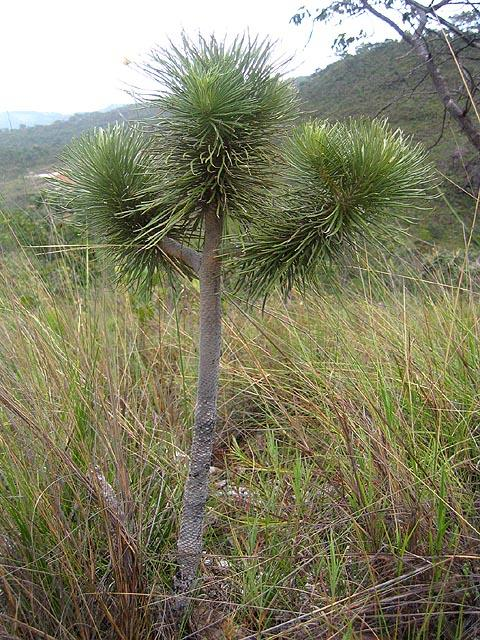
Lychnophora ericoides in the campos rupestres habitat.

== Geography ==
Campo rupestre (sensu lato) occupies less than one percent of the Brazilian territory, 66,447 km^{2}, and it is concentrated mostly in the states of Minas Gerais, Bahia and Goiás. This ecoregion consists of a series of relatively small and isolated grasslands and rocky outcrops mostly distributed in the Espinhaço Range in eastern Brazil, surrounded by lowland and montane forests. It also forms discontinuous enclaves in other mountain ranges, such as Carajás Mountains, Serra da Canastra, Serra do Caparaó, Chapada Diamantina and many others.

Campo rupestre is found at elevations from 900 to 2,033 meters (2,953 to 6,670 ft) and is characterized by dry winters and wet summers, strong winds and high levels of irradiance. The soil in this ecoregion is nutrient-poor, extremely shallow and young. The geological formation subtending this impoverished soil is ancient, stable, weathered and diverse; campo rupestre areas occur on quartzite, granite, migmatites, gneiss, metarenites, and itabirites. The soil composition represents a challenge for vegetation to establish; plants must overcome very low levels of P, high levels of Al (in some areas), acidity and low water retention (due to shallowness of the soil). Because of these conditions, the flora thriving in the campo rupestre has developed several adaptations, such as carnivory, C4 metabolism, superficial root systems (to absorb periodic rain water faster), underground storage, stomatal crypts, etc.

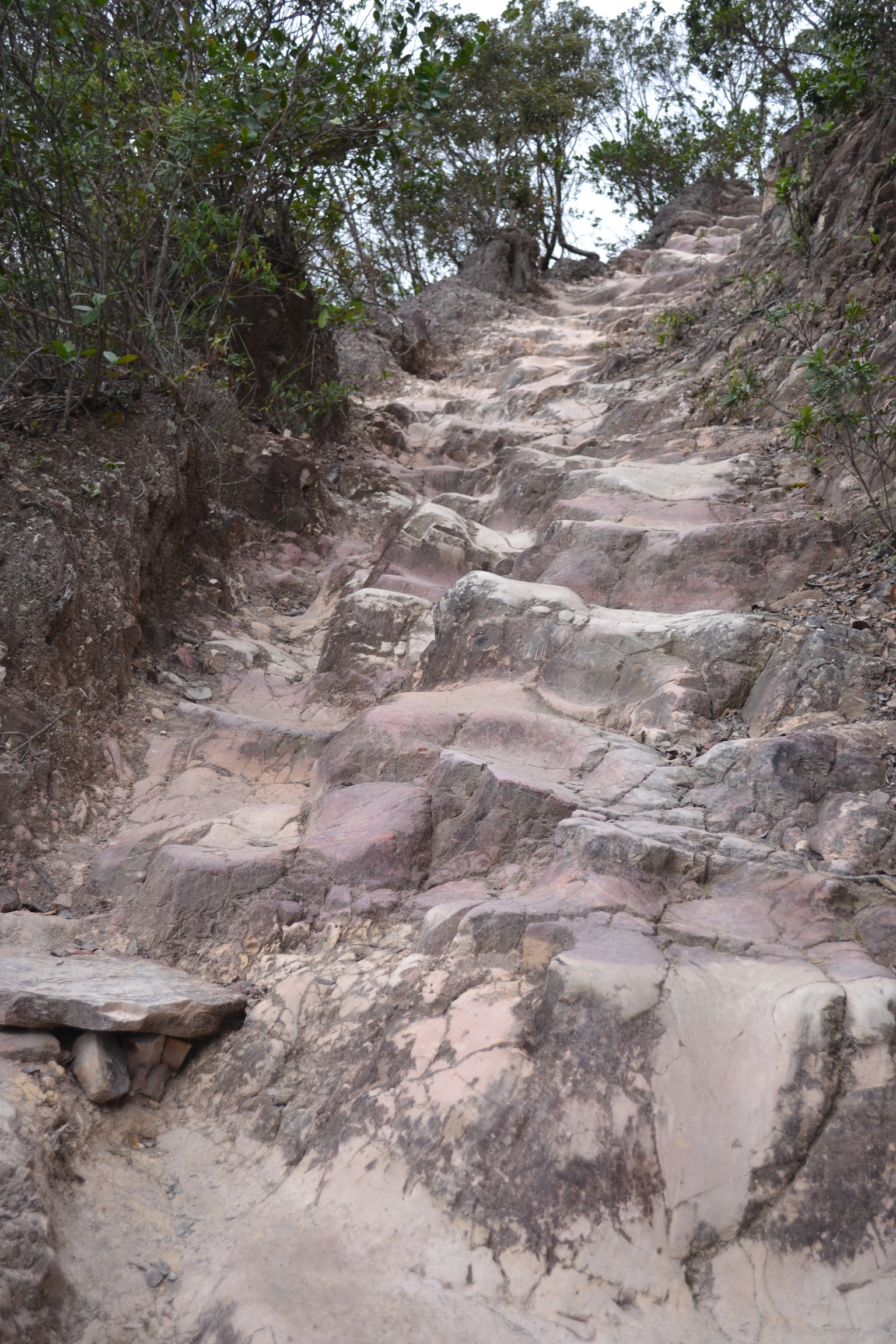
Soil at Chapada Diamantina in Bahia

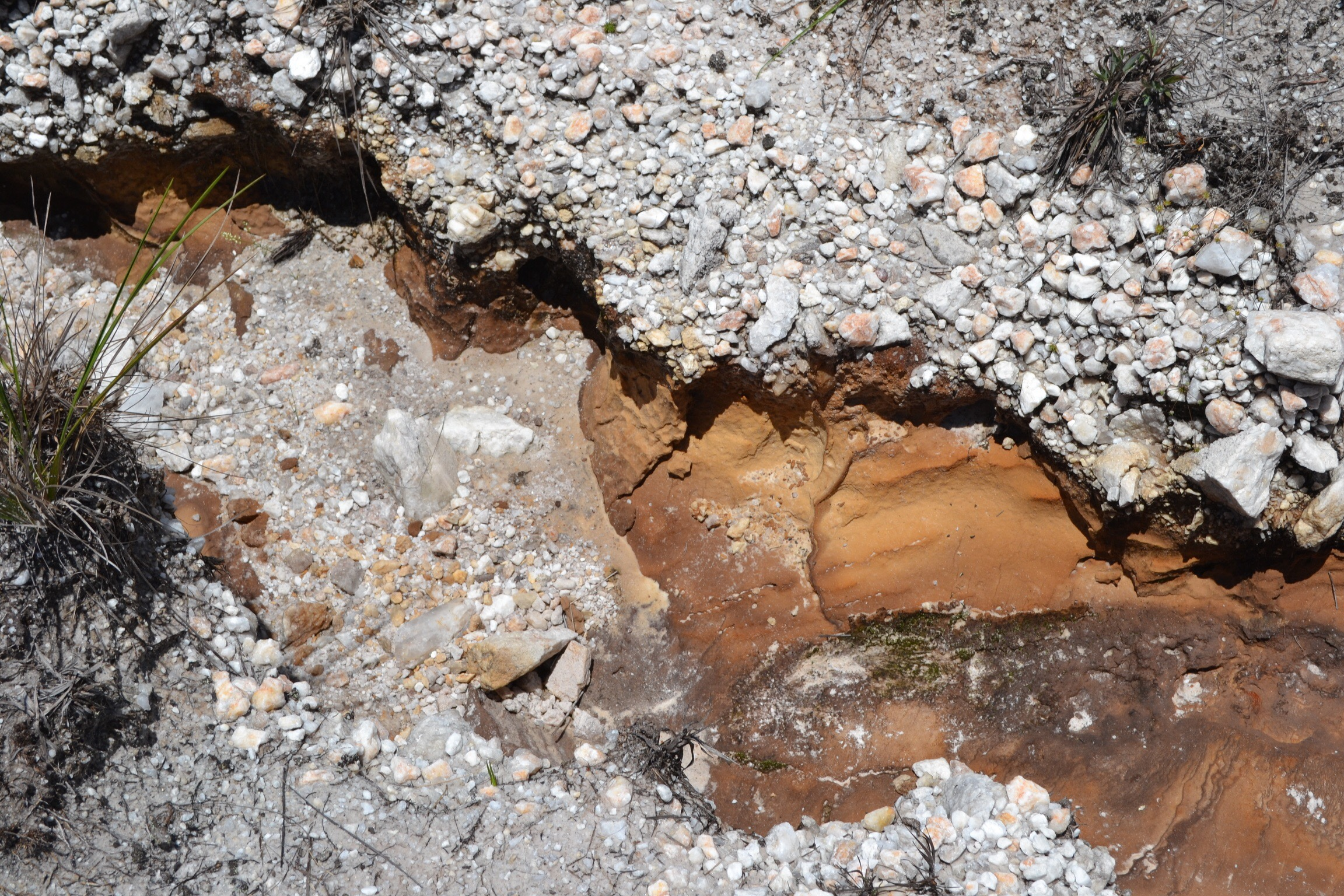
Soil photographed at Serra do Cipó in Minas Gerais

=== OCBIL theory and campo rupestre ===
Old climatically buffered and infertile landscapes (OCBILs) are areas distributed around the globe that potentially share both abiotic and biotic commonalities. These landscapes are often expected to harbor a high number of endemic, old and rare lineages specialized in obtaining nutritional elements from impoverished soils and presenting biological adaptations to cope with harsh environmental conditions. There are at least three areas located in three different continents that can be characterized as ancient and climatically and geologically stable; the Pantepui Highlands in Venezuela, South Africa's Greater Cape and the Southwest Australian Floristic region. Even though the campo rupestre in Brazil was not formerly acknowledged as an OCBIL area, Hopper mentions "parts of Brazil" could actually be identified as this particular landscape. Moreover, the resemblance of this Brazilian ecoregion with the areas mentioned above has been highlighted by other researchers, who suggest that the campo rupestre should actually be formally considered as an OCBIL. The relevance of understanding the campo rupestre as part of these landscapes implies the recognition of common patterns among these areas, which can be very beneficial not only for establishing international collaborative work but more importantly as a way to better understand similar processes threatening the conservation of this delicate ecoregion.

== Flora ==
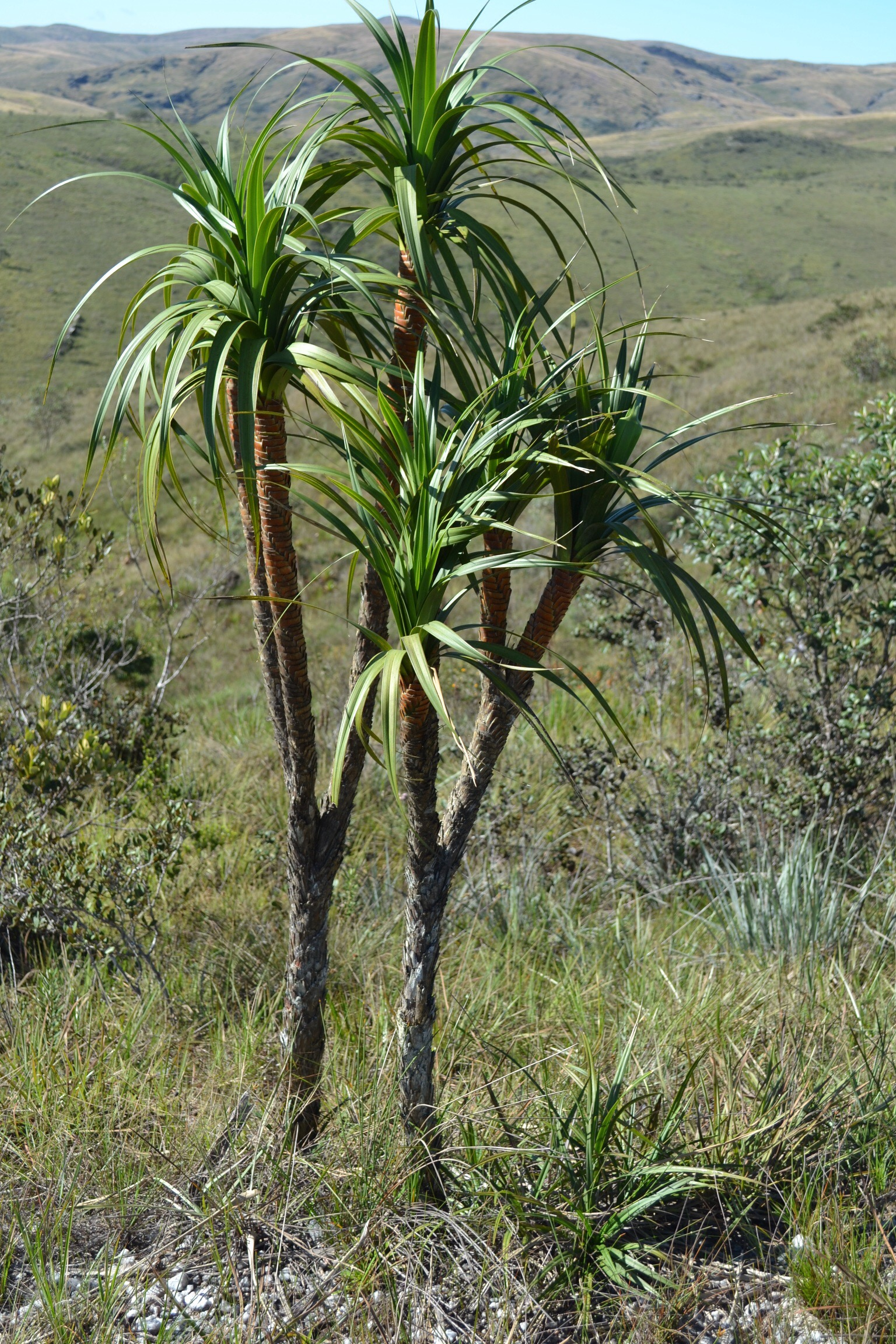
Member of the lineage Velloziaceae

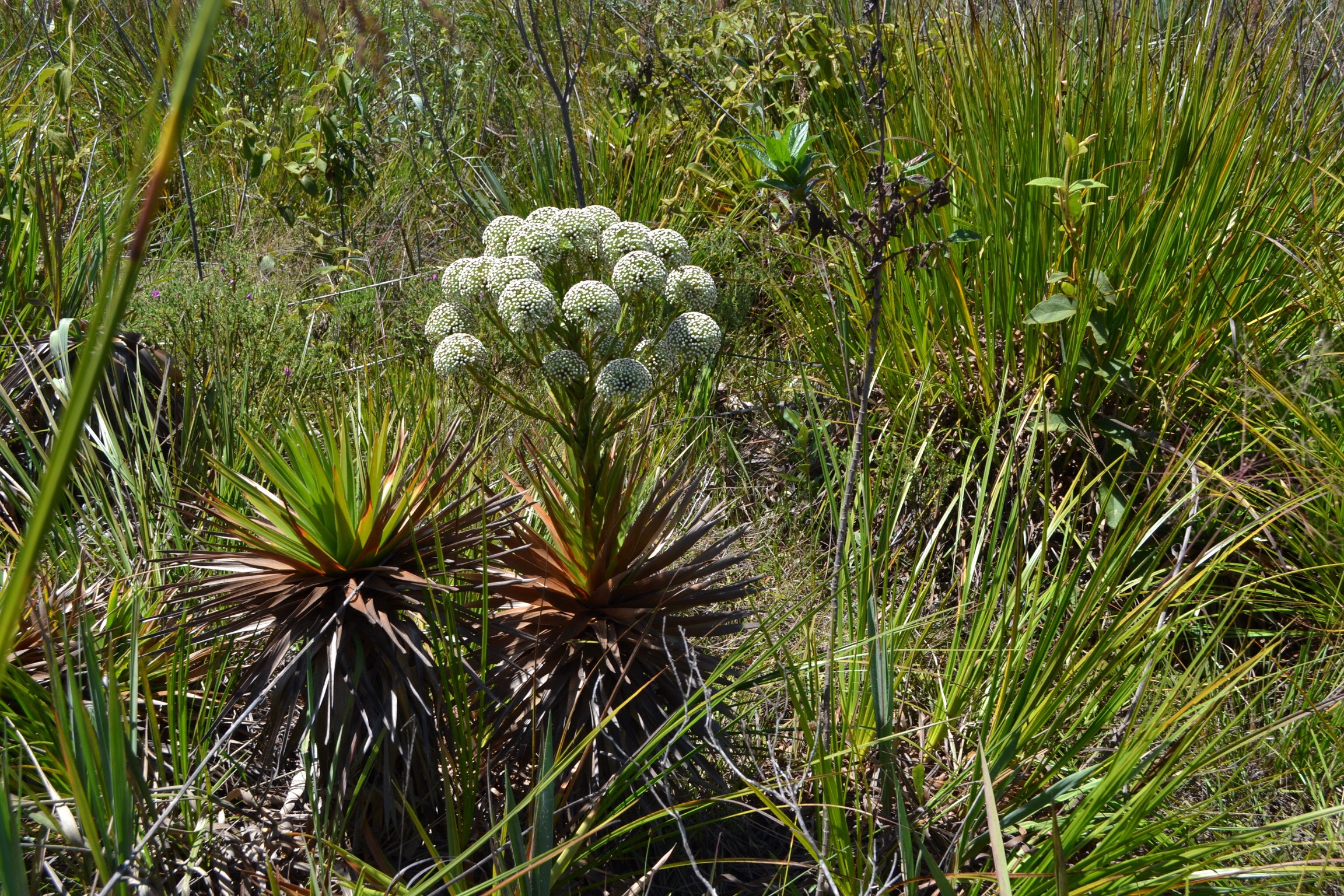
Member of the lineage Eriocaulaceae

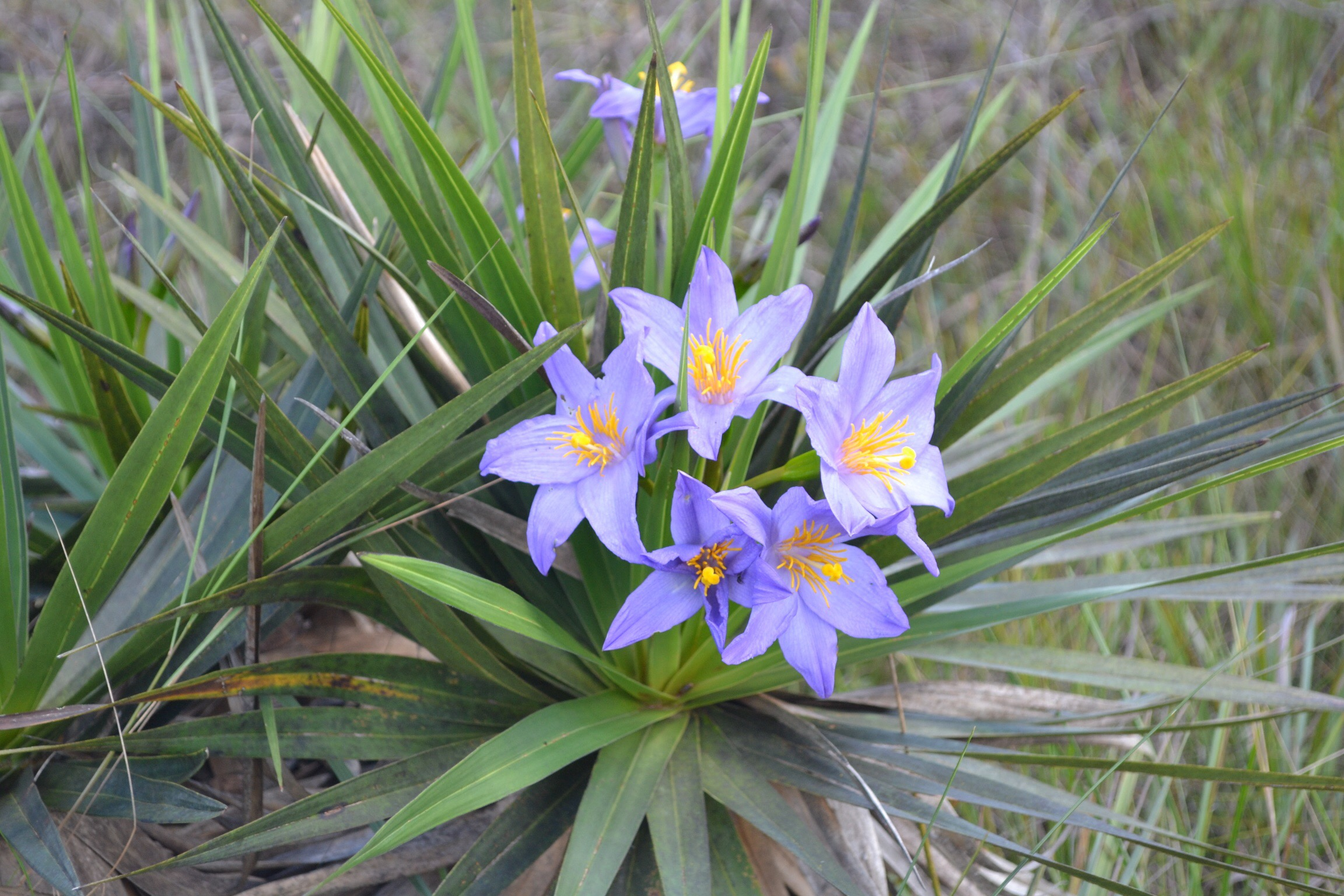
Member of the lineage Velloziaceae

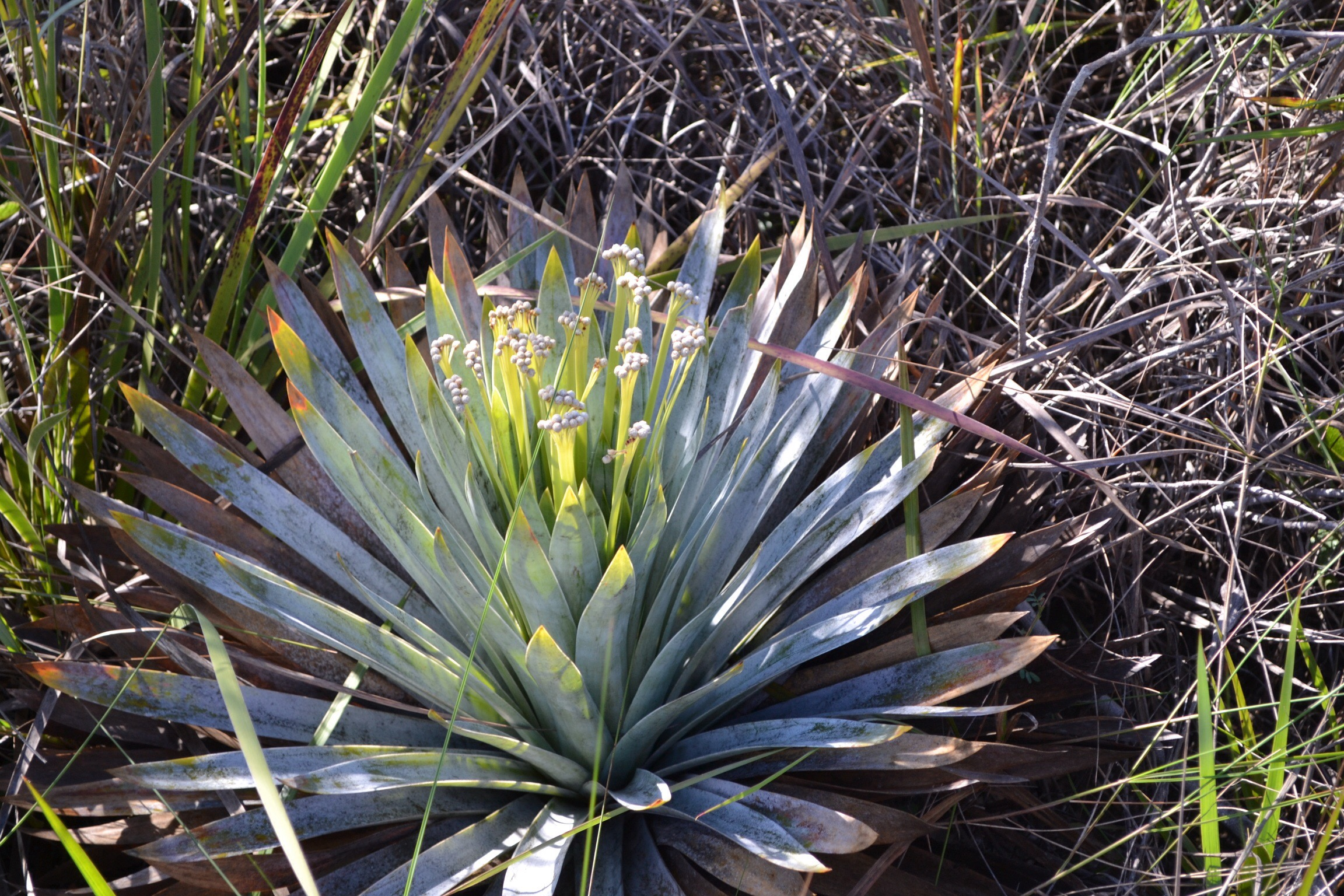
Member of the lineage Eriocaulaceae

The campo rupestre ecoregion consists of a distinct set of habitats where open vegetation prevails and is subject to harsh climatic and pedological conditions. Rocky outcrops, grasslands and shrublands account for the most common habitats and are dominated by lineages such as Velloziaceae, Cyperaceae, Poaceae and Eriocaulaceae. Although few plant families predominate in this ecoregion, species richness is high; the Espinhaço Range alone accounts for seven percent of the Brazilian flora, while all the mountain ranges comprising the entirety of campo rupestre harbor approximately 15% of Brazil's plant diversity. The relatively high levels of diversity in the campo rupestre can be explained by the environmental requirements unique to each habitat (or micro-habitat), which vary according to a wide range in latitude and elevation. Insularity can also foster diversity in the campos rupestres; given its discontinuous distribution across several mountain ranges overcoming long-distance dispersal can pose a challenge to many lineages.

Coupled with antiquity, the diversity of habitats found within the campos rupestres leads to many lineages being adapted to specific environmental conditions. As a consequence, the number of endemic and rare species is very elevated; around 30% of the flora is restricted to this ecoregion. Within the families Velloziaceae and Eriocaulaceae around 70% of all species are endemic to the campo rupestre; a number that possibly has grown over the past 20 years since it was last investigated. High levels of endemism can also be identified by beta diversity analyses, which measure differentiation levels between two areas. A study conducted across three different ironstone sites (itabirite) in the campo rupestre identified the proportion of shared lineages as less than 5%, demonstrating a high level of beta diversity among the sites.

Predominance of species varies according to the different soil types. Grasses typically occur in sandy soils, with many species from the graminoid families Cyperaceae, Poaceae and Eriocaulaceae, whereas the rocky outcrops are usually dominated by orchids, bromeliads and species of Clusiaceae and Velloziaceae. The List of Species of the Brazilian Flora published in 2015 around 5000 plant species for the campo rupestre; according to REFLORA by 2019 this number has currently increased in about 100 species, if the database is queried for plants occurring in "Highland Rocky Field". However, due to the heterogeneity of vegetation types assembled in the campo rupestre and increasing knowledge in floristic composition, this number is most likely underestimated and needs to be reassessed.

== Fauna ==
Indigenous mammals include tapirs, capybaras, bush dogs, and armadillos. Indigenous reptiles include crocodiles, lizards, tortoises and iguanas. The riparian zones offer habitat for birds, reptiles, and mammals that require more water than the plateau species.

Endangered mammals include fossorial giant rat (Kunsia fronto), orange-brown Atlantic tree-rat (Phyllomys brasiliensis) and giant otter (Pteronura brasiliensis). Endangered amphibians include Izecksohn's treefrog (Bokermannohyla izecksohni) and the reticulate leaf frog (Phyllomedusa ayeaye) . Endangered birds include Brazilian merganser (Mergus octosetaceus) and yellow-bellied seedeater (Sporophila nigricollis).

== Conservation ==
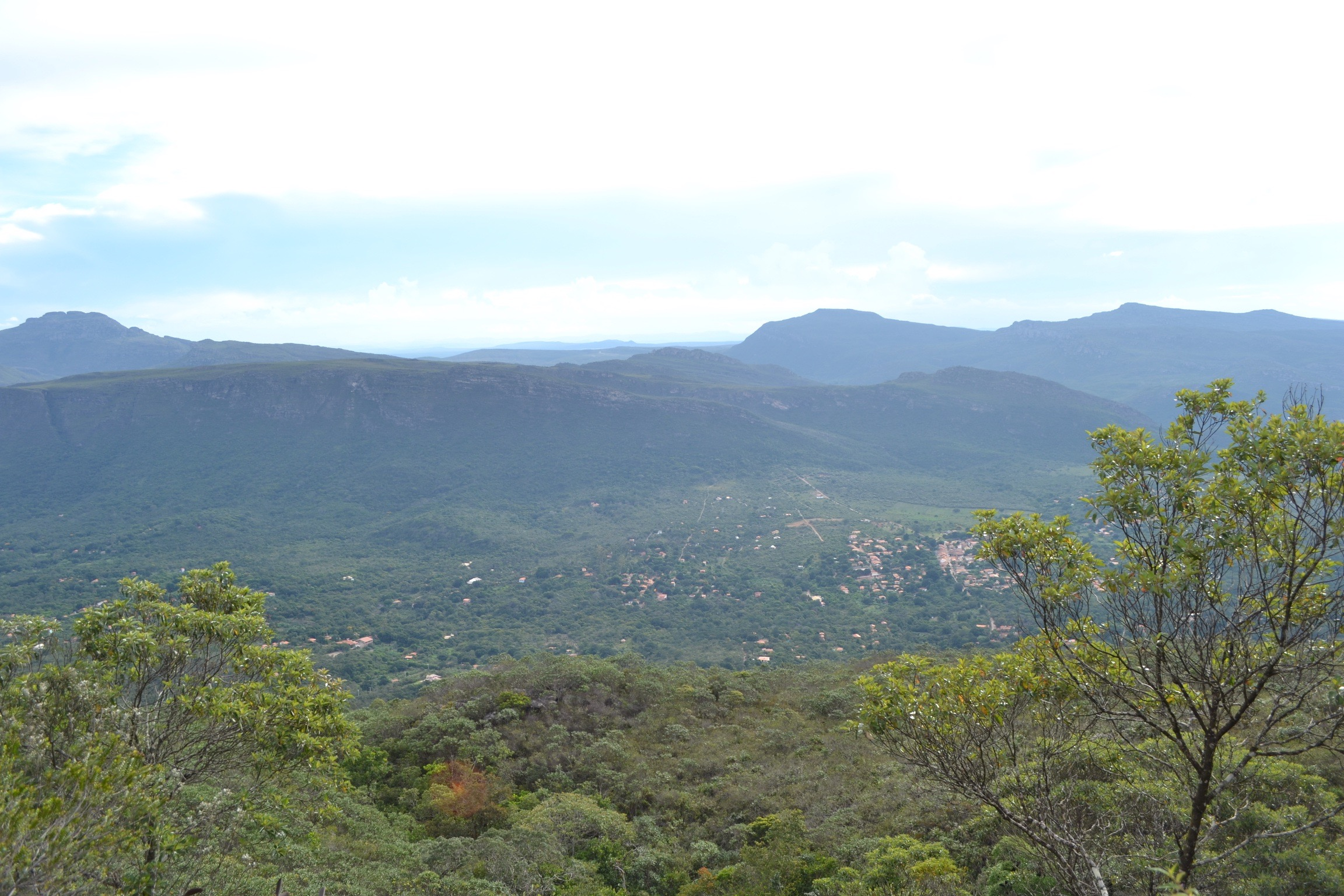
Photo showing human occupation in the vicinity of Chapada Diamantina

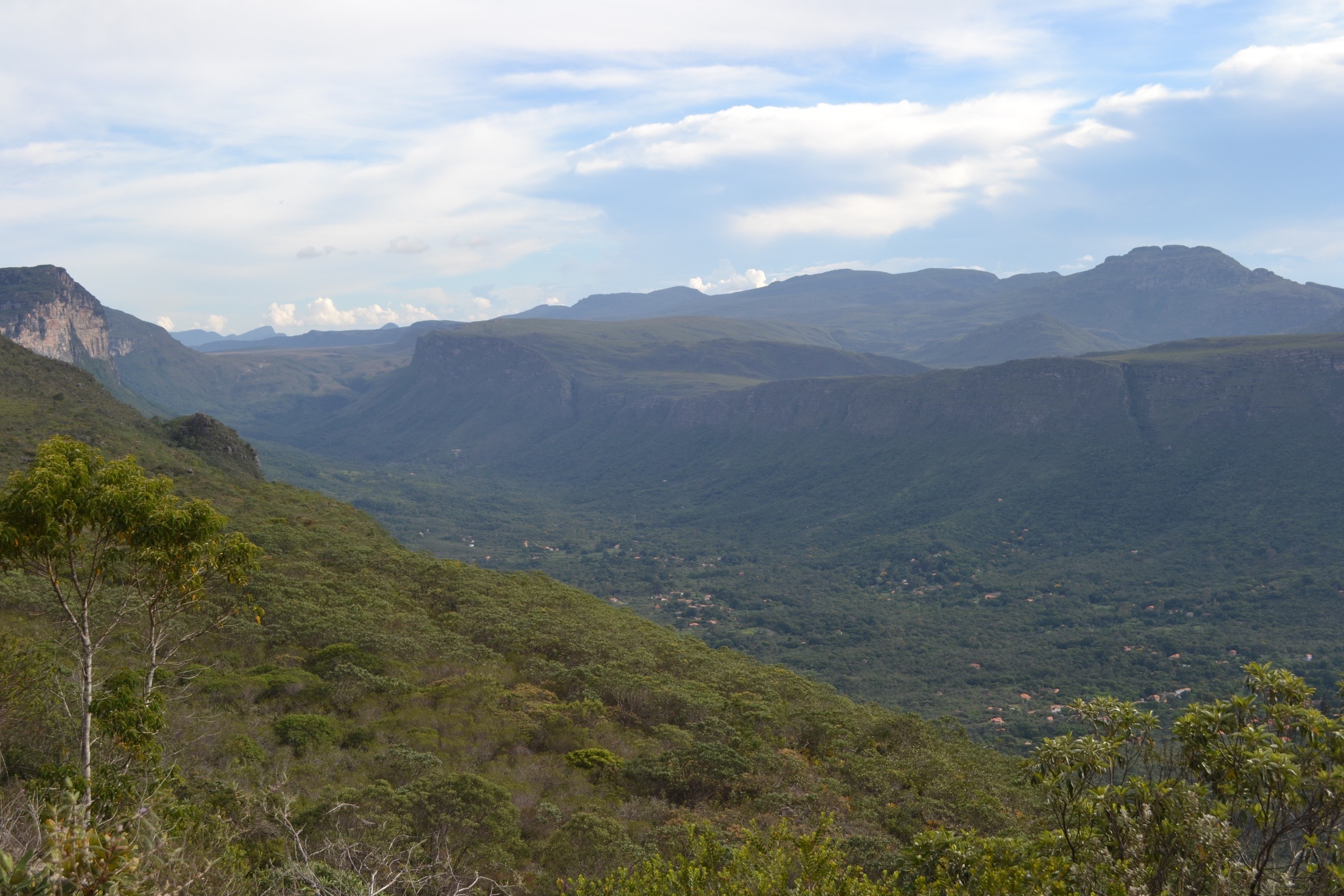
Landscape showing the mountainous region observed from the top of an area of campo rupestre

The main threats to the campo rupestre come from mining, extraction of native plants, cattle ranching, tourism, urban expansion, climate change and invasive species. Because this ecoregion has received far less attention from both the scientific community and the general public it stands out as a delicate area in terms of conservation status. In fact, in 2005, UNESCO emphasized the importance of conserving the campo rupestre by recognizing the Espinhaço Range as part of the Biosphere Reserve, with two-thirds of its 3 076 million hectares constituting conservation units. Still, few scientific studies have addressed the biodiversity and conservation of the campo rupestre when compared to forested regions in Brazil. Moreover, even though tourism has grown over the past four decades due to facilitated access, the general public is still unaware of the ecosystem services this region promotes and the benefits of preserving the campo rupestre.

Monoculture stands out as another relevant issue affecting the campo rupestre; eucalyptus plantations represent a serious threat due to their ability to thrive in poor soils, such as the ones found throughout this ecoregion. General misconceptions that grasslands and rocky outcrops present low levels of biodiversity, given their dry and "homogeneous" aspect, have only worsened this situation. The eucalyptus plantations not only reduce the number of native species but they also promote intense fragmentation of the campo rupestre; in less than 20 years the southern portion of the Espinhaço Range registered an impressive increase in the planted area of eucalyptus (30 thousand hectares), drastically intensifying habitat fragmentation.

Fire in the campo rupestre symbolizes both a threat as well a natural phenomenon; readily available fuel combined with environmental conditions facilitates the occurrence of natural and anthropic-related fires. While fire boosts the reproductive system of some species by positively impacting the number of seeds or seedling recruitment it can also negatively affect the sparse and relictual forests intermingled with the more common rocky outcrops and grasslands. Even lineages that rely on fire can be negatively influenced depending on its frequency. When fire episodes increase in frequency both seed banks and resprouters can be severely affected.

== See also ==
- List of plants of Atlantic Forest vegetation of Brazil
- Ecoregions in the Atlantic Forest biome
- List of ecoregions in Brazil
