= Piptocoma =

Scientific classification
- Kingdom: Plantae
- Clade: Tracheophytes
- Clade: Angiosperms
- Clade: Eudicots
- Clade: Asterids
- Order: Asterales
- Family: Asteraceae
- Subfamily: Vernonioideae
- Tribe: Vernonieae
- Genus: Piptocoma; Cass.

Type species
- Piptocoma rufescens Cass.

Synonyms
- Adenocyclus Less.; Pollalesta Kunth

Genus of flowering plants

Piptocoma, common name velvetshrub, is a genus of Caribbean and Latin American plants in the tribe Vernonieae within the family Asteraceae.

Species

- Piptocoma acevedroi Pruski - Puerto Rico
- Piptocoma antillana Urb. - Puerto Rico, US Virgin Islands
- Piptocoma areolata (Wurdack) Pruski - eastern Venezuela
- Piptocoma barinensis (Aristeg.) Pruski - Venezuela
- Piptocoma discolor (Kunth) Pruski - Costa Rica, Panama, Colombia, Ecuador, Peru, Brazil
- Piptocoma ekmanii Alain - Hispaniola
- Piptocoma hypochlora (S.F.Blake) Pruski - Venezuela, Trinidad
- Piptocoma macrophylla (Sch.Bip.) Pruski - Venezuela, Colombia
- Piptocoma milleri (J.R.Johnst.) Pruski - Venezuela, Trinidad
- Piptocoma neglecta (Stutts) Pruski - Venezuela
- Piptocoma niceforoi (Cuatrec.) Pruski - Venezuela, Colombia
- Piptocoma roraimensis (Steyerm.) Pruski - Venezuela, Guyana, Brazil
- Piptocoma rufescens Cass. - Hispaniola
- Piptocoma samanensis Alain - Hispaniola
- Piptocoma schomburgkii (Sch.Bip.) Pruski - Venezuela, Guyana, Brazil, Colombia, Suriname, French Guinea
- Piptocoma spruceana (Benth.) Pruski - Amazonas State in Venezuela
- Piptocoma trujillensis (Aristeg.) Pruski - Venezuela
- Piptocoma vernonioides (Kunth) Pruski - Venezuela

formerly included

Several species now in Lychnophora
