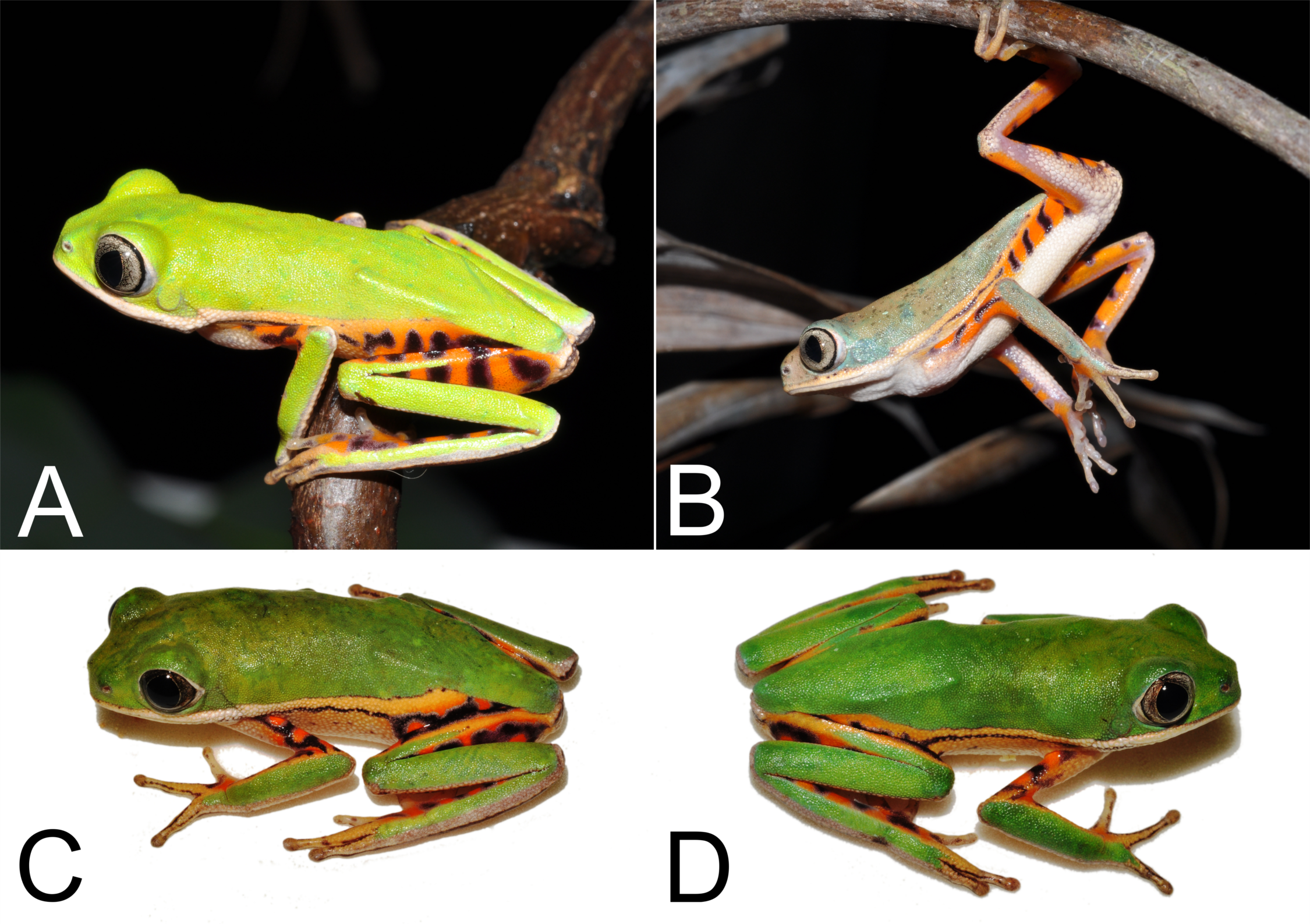

Conservation status
- Least Concern (IUCN 3.1)

Scientific classification
- Kingdom: Animalia
- Phylum: Chordata
- Class: Amphibia
- Order: Anura
- Family: Phyllomedusidae
- Genus: Pithecopus
- Species: P. araguaius

Binomial name
- Pithecopus araguaius Haga, Andrade, Bruschi, Recco-Pimentel, and Giaretta, 2017

= Pithecopus araguaius =

Species of amphibian

Pithecopus araguaius is a species of frog in the family Hylidae, endemic to Brazil. It has been observed in Mato Grasso. This frog has been observed 418 meters above sea level.

The holotype male measured 30.6 mm long in snout-vent length. The skin of the dorsum and backs of the legs and feet is green in color. This frog has a green stripe on each hind leg and a dark stripe on each flank. There is orange coloration on the front legs and hidden parts of the thighs. Portions of the lips are white in color.

Scientists named this frog araguaius after the nearby Araguaia River. The female frog lays eggs on leaves overhanging temporary bodies of water. When the tadpoles hatch, they fall into the water below.

This frog is not considered to be in danger of dying out because of its large and variegated habitat. This frog has been found in Brazil's Cerrado habitat. It lives in grasslands, including pastureland, and it has been observed in urban areas.
