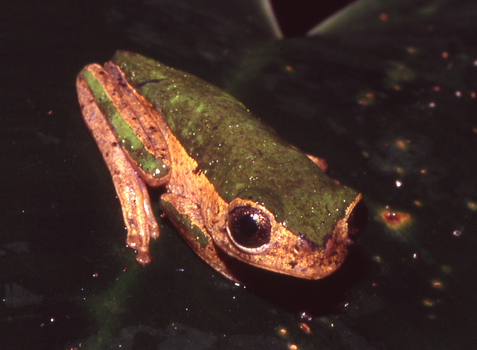

Conservation status
- Least Concern (IUCN 3.1)

Scientific classification
- Kingdom: Animalia
- Phylum: Chordata
- Class: Amphibia
- Order: Anura
- Family: Phyllomedusidae
- Genus: Pithecopus
- Species: P. palliatus

Binomial name
- Pithecopus palliatus (Peters, 1873)

Synonyms
- Phyllomedusa palliata Peters, 1873

= Pithecopus palliatus =

Species of frog

Pithecopus palliatus is a species of frog in the subfamily Phyllomedusinae. It is found in Bolivia, Brazil, Ecuador, Peru, and possibly Colombia. Its natural habitats are subtropical or tropical moist lowland forests and intermittent freshwater marshes. It is threatened by habitat loss. It has been observed between 100 and 400 meters above sea level.

The adult frog measures 37.7 to 43.8 mm in snout-vent length and the adult female frog 38.8 to 49.1 mm.

This frog lays eggs near temporary bodies of water, such as flooded places. They lay eggs on overhanging leaves, and then the tadpoles fall off the leaves into the water.
