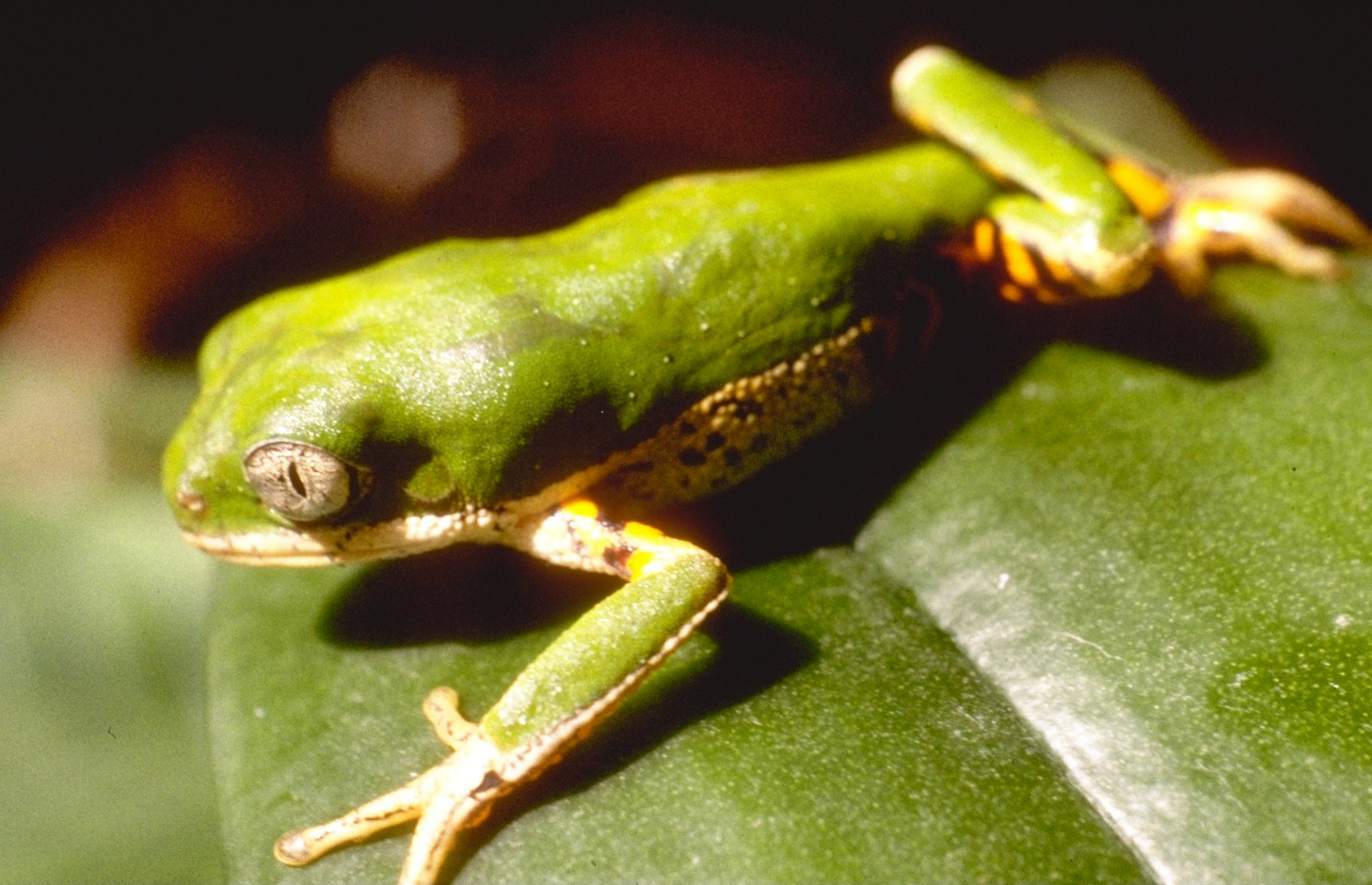

Conservation status
- Least Concern (IUCN 3.1)

Scientific classification
- Kingdom: Animalia
- Phylum: Chordata
- Class: Amphibia
- Order: Anura
- Family: Phyllomedusidae
- Genus: Pithecopus
- Species: P. hypochondrialis

Binomial name
- Pithecopus hypochondrialis (Daudin, 1800)

Synonyms
- Phyllomedusa hypochondrialis (Daudin, 1800)

= Pithecopus hypochondrialis =

Species of amphibian

Pithecopus hypochondrialis, the northern orange-legged leaf frog or tiger-legged monkey frog, is a species of frog in the subfamily Phyllomedusinae found in South America. Its natural habitats are subtropical or tropical dry forests, subtropical or tropical moist lowland forests, subtropical or tropical moist shrubland, subtropical or tropical seasonally wet or flooded lowland grassland, intermittent freshwater marshes, pastureland, plantations, rural gardens, urban areas, and heavily degraded former forests. This frog has also been observed in cities. It has been observed as high as 1500 meters above sea level.

This frog is nocturnal and has been found perching shrubs and other plants in forests and in seasonally flooded grasslands. The male frog sits near a temporary pond and calls to the female frogs. The female frog lays eggs on leaves overhanging the water. The tadpoles fall into the water after they hatch.

Phyllomedusa hypochondrialis walking up a near-vertical surface

P. hypochondrialis can use rapid color changes as camouflage to defend itself against predators. While still understudied, it has been shown that, in a nocturnal setting, dynamic color changing can be effective against avian predators when camouflaging into grass or leaf litter.

This frog can be affected by habitat loss given the deforestation associated with fire, agriculture, and cattle overgrazing. This frog has been sold as part of the international pet trade. But because this frog can live in cities, it is not in great danger of dying out.
