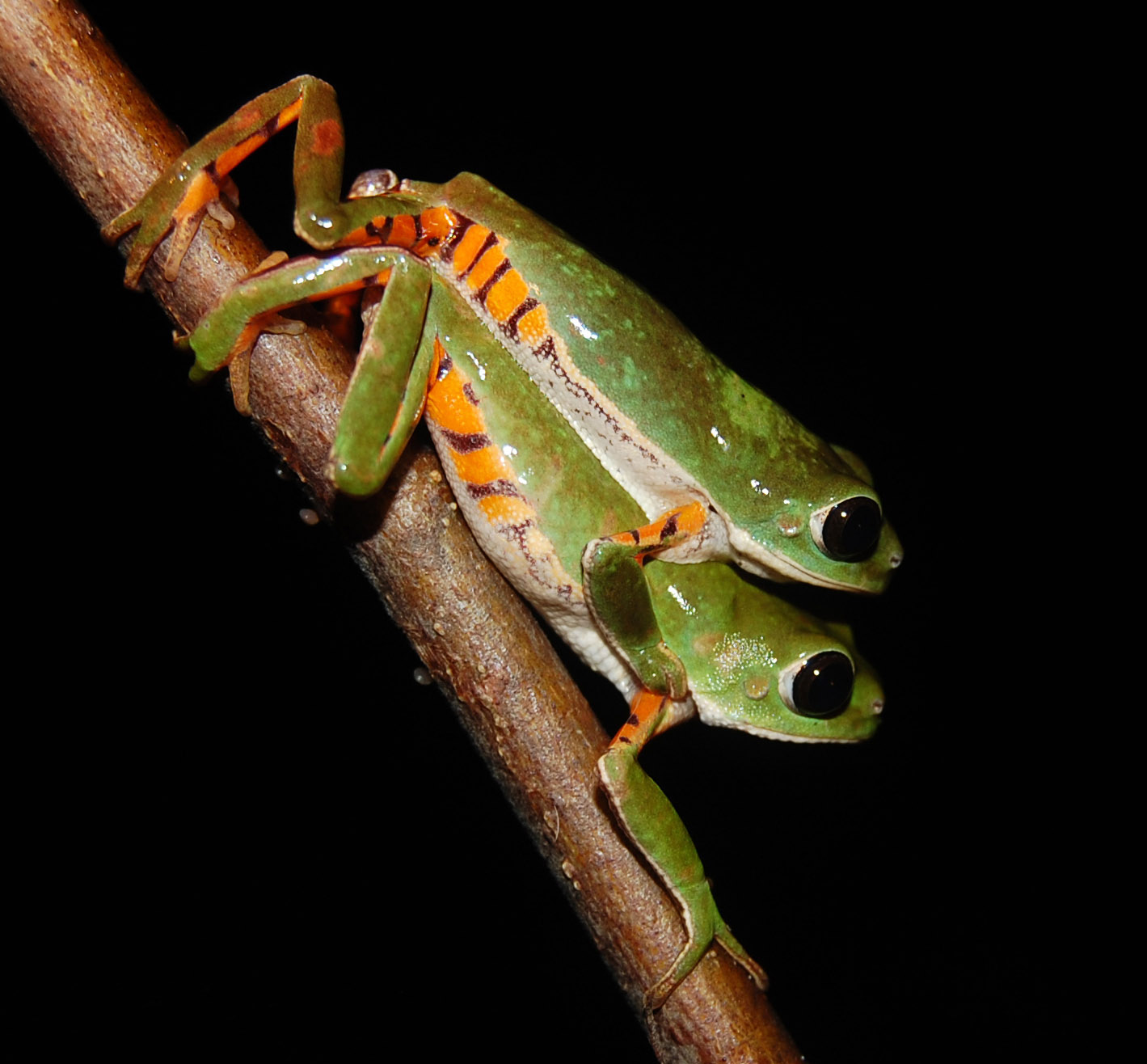

Conservation status
- Data Deficient (IUCN 3.1)

Scientific classification
- Kingdom: Animalia
- Phylum: Chordata
- Class: Amphibia
- Order: Anura
- Family: Phyllomedusidae
- Genus: Pithecopus
- Species: P. nordestinus

Binomial name
- Pithecopus nordestinus (Caramaschi, 2006)

Synonyms
- Phyllomedusa nordestina Caramaschi, 2006

= Pithecopus nordestinus =

Species of amphibian

Pithecopus nordestinus is a species of frog in the family Hylidae, endemic to Brazil.

== Original description ==
- Ulisses Caramaschi (2006). "Redefinicao do grupo de Phyllomedusa hypochondrialis, com redescricao de P. megacephala (Miranda-Ribeiro, 1926), revalidacao de P. azurea Cope, 1826 e descricao de uma nova especie (Amphibia, Anura, Hylidae)". Arquivos do Museu Nacional. 64: 159–179.
