= Lychnophora albertinioides =

Scientific classification
- Kingdom: Plantae
- Clade: Embryophytes
- Clade: Tracheophytes
- Clade: Spermatophytes
- Clade: Angiosperms
- Clade: Eudicots
- Clade: Asterids
- Order: Asterales
- Family: Asteraceae
- Genus: Lychnophora
- Species: L. albertinioides

Binomial name
- Lychnophora albertinioides Gardner, 1846

Species of flowering plant

Lychnophora albertinioides is a species of flowering plant in the family Asteraceae.

== Description ==
This species has oblanceolate leaves. The leaves are also semi-amplexicaul and sheathing.

== Distribution ==
This species occurs in Minas Gerais, Brazil.
