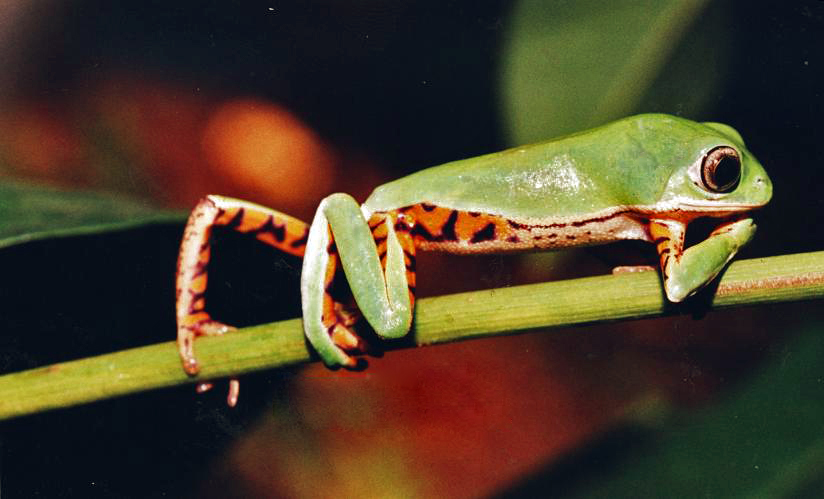

Conservation status
- Data Deficient (IUCN 3.1)

Scientific classification
- Kingdom: Animalia
- Phylum: Chordata
- Class: Amphibia
- Order: Anura
- Family: Phyllomedusidae
- Genus: Pithecopus
- Species: P. azureus

Binomial name
- Pithecopus azureus (Cope, 1862)

Synonyms
- Phyllomedusa azurea (Cope, 1862); Pithecopus azureus (Cope, 1866); Phyllomedusa hypochondrialis azurea (Mertens, 1926); Pithecopus hypochondrialis azureus (Lutz, 1966); Phyllomedusa azurea (Norman, 1994); Pithecopus azureus (Duellman, Marion, and Hedges, 2016)

= Pithecopus azureus =

Species of amphibian

Pithecopus azureus is a species of frog in the subfamily Phyllomedusinae that lives in Brazil, Paraguay, Argentina, Bolivia, and Peru.

The adult frog measures 31 to 44 mm in snout-vent length. Its eyes are disproportionately large relative to its head. It has very little webbing on its forepaws. The skin of the dorsum is bright green, but it can change color to brown during the day. The ventrum is whitish. There is a green stripe down each side of the hind legs. Some individuals have orange and black stripes on the legs.

This frog is in some danger of dying out because of habitat loss. People convert its habitats to soybean farms and sugar cane farms and build dams nearby.

== Original publication ==
- Ulisses Caramaschi (2006). "Redefinicao do grupo de Phyllomedusa hypochondrialis, com redescricao de P. megacephala (Miranda-Ribeiro, 1926), revalidacao de P. azurea Cope, 1826 e descricao de uma nova especie (Amphibia, Anura, Hylidae)". Arquivos do Museu Nacional. 64: 159–179.
