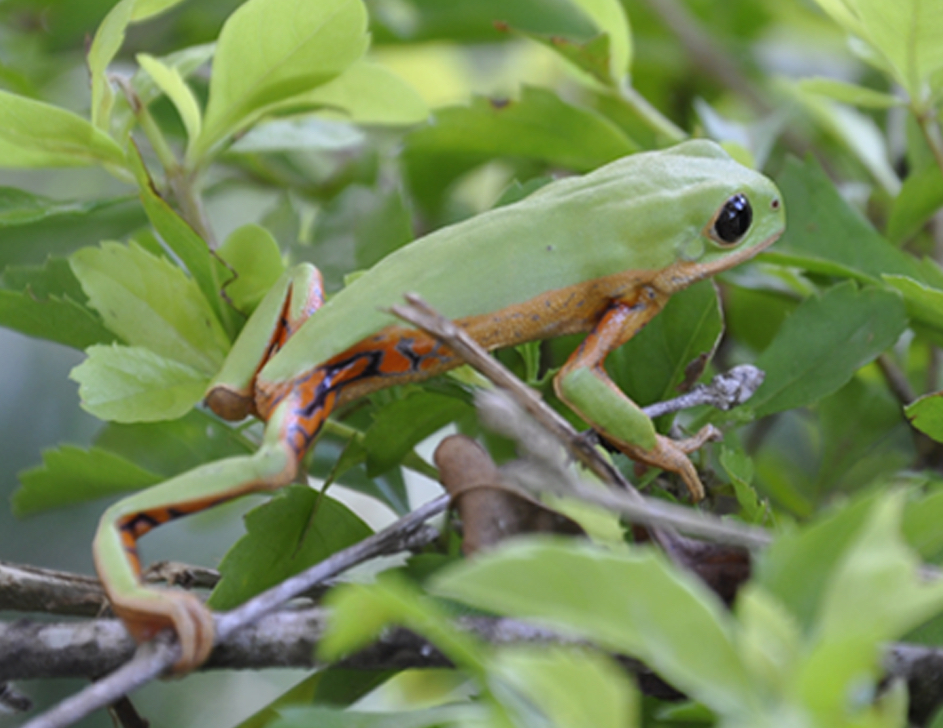

Conservation status
- Critically Endangered (IUCN 3.1)

Scientific classification
- Kingdom: Animalia
- Phylum: Chordata
- Class: Amphibia
- Order: Anura
- Family: Phyllomedusidae
- Genus: Pithecopus
- Species: P. rusticus

Binomial name
- Pithecopus rusticus (Bruschi, Lucas, Garcia, and Recco-Pimentel, 2014)

Synonyms
- Phyllomedusa rustica Bruschi, Lucas, Garcia, and Recco-Pimentel, 2014

= Pithecopus rusticus =

Species of amphibian

Pithecopus rusticus is a species of frog in the family Hylidae, endemic to Brazil. This frog has been observed 1330 meters above sea level.

This frog lives in grassland in the forests on the Atlantic side of Brazil.

Scientists say this frog is critically endangered it lives in such a small place: Scientists spotted it on private property in 2019, but after the owner removed the grassy places, scientists could not find the frog again. Scientists think this frog might be dying because of the fungal disease chytridiomycosis in addition to habitat loss. The pet trade may also be a factor.

Scientists believe this frog lays eggs on leaves over water and the tadpoles drop into the water after they hatch.
