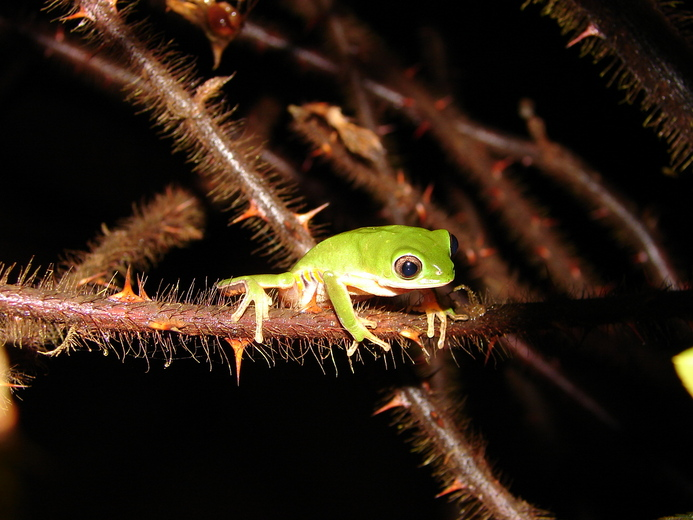
- Pithecopus azureus, the type species

Scientific classification
- Kingdom: Animalia
- Phylum: Chordata
- Class: Amphibia
- Order: Anura
- Family: Phyllomedusidae
- Genus: Pithecopus; Cope, 1866

Type species
- Phyllomedusa azurea Cope, 1862

Species
- 12 species (see text)

Synonyms
- Bradymedusa Miranda-Ribeiro, 1926

= Pithecopus =

Genus of amphibians

Pithecopus is a genus of frogs in the subfamily Phyllomedusinae. Species of the genus Pithecopus are found in tropical South America east of the Andes, from southern Venezuela to northern Argentina. Resurrected from the synonymy of Phyllomedusa in 2016, it corresponds to the former Phyllomedusa hypochondrialis group. Its sister group is Callimedusa.

== Etymology ==
The name of this genus is derived from the Greek pithekodes, which means "ape-like".

== Description ==
Pithecopus are medium-sized frogs measuring about 45 mm (1.8 in) in snout–vent length. Toe I is much longer than toe II, and is opposable to it. No vomerine teeth are present. The tadpoles have a moderately small oral disc that is anteroventrally directed.

== Species ==
There are 12 species in this genus:

- Pithecopus araguaius (Haga, Andrade, Bruschi, Recco-Pimentel, and Giaretta, 2017)
- Pithecopus ayeaye (Lutz, 1966)
- Pithecopus azureus (Cope, 1862)
- Pithecopus centralis (Bokermann, 1965)
- Pithecopus gonzagai (Andrade, Haga, Ferreira, Recco-Pimentel, Toledo, and Bruschi, 2020)
- Pithecopus hypochondrialis (Daudin, 1800)
- Pithecopus megacephalus (Miranda-Ribeiro, 1926)
- Pithecopus nordestinus (Caramaschi, 2006)
- Pithecopus oreades (Brandão, 2002)
- Pithecopus palliatus (Peters, 1873)
- Pithecopus rohdei (Mertens, 1926)
- Pithecopus rusticus (Bruschi, Lucas, Garcia, and Recco-Pimentel, 2014)

The AmphibiaWeb lists only two species (Pithecopus araguaius and Pithecopus gonzagai), the rest being included in Phyllomedusa.
