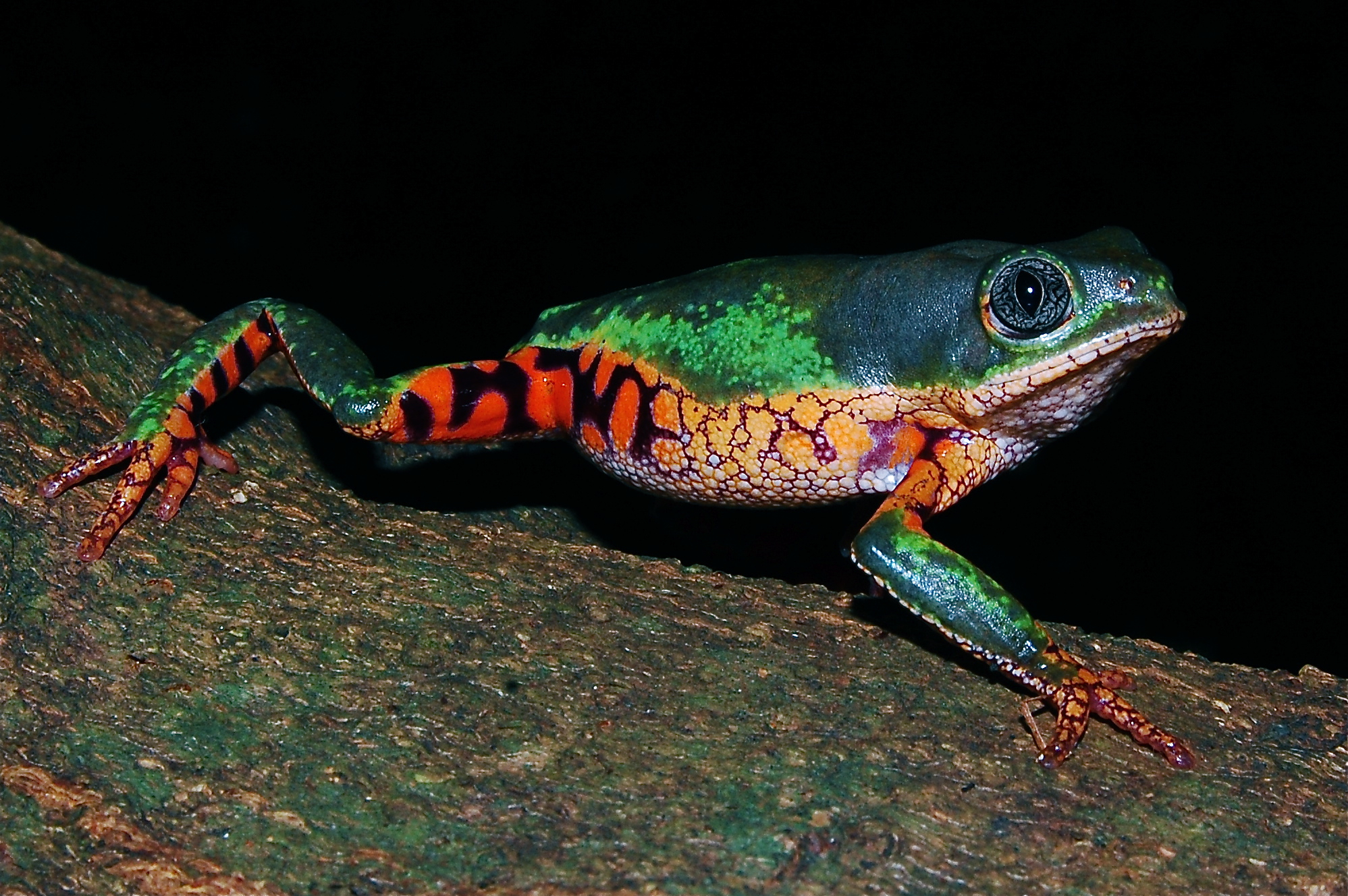

Conservation status
- Data Deficient (IUCN 3.1)

Scientific classification
- Kingdom: Animalia
- Phylum: Chordata
- Class: Amphibia
- Order: Anura
- Family: Hylidae
- Genus: Pithecopus
- Species: P. oreades

Binomial name
- Pithecopus oreades (Brandão, 2002)

Synonyms
- Phyllomedusa oreades Brandão, 2002; Phyllomedusa araguari Giaretta, Oliveira, and Kokubum, 2007

= Pithecopus oreades =

Species of frog

Pithecopus oreades is a species of frog in the subfamily Phyllomedusinae. It is endemic to Brazil and is known from the states of Goiás and Minas Gerais as well as from the Federal District.

Pithecopus oreades inhabits open Cerrado savanna with short and scattered shrubs at elevations above 900 m (3,000 ft) above sea level. Breeding takes place in small streams and the tadpoles develop in pools within the streams. Threats to this species are unknown.

P. oreades skin secretions research has suggested therapeutic value, especially as an anti-Trypanosoma cruzi agent to prevent infections during blood transfusion.
