= Pithecopus megacephalus =

Conservation status
- Data Deficient (IUCN 3.1)

Scientific classification
- Kingdom: Animalia
- Phylum: Chordata
- Class: Amphibia
- Order: Anura
- Family: Hylidae
- Genus: Pithecopus
- Species: P. megacephalus

Binomial name
- Pithecopus megacephalus (Miranda-Ribeiro, 1926)

Synonyms
- Bradymedusa megacephala Miranda-Ribeiro, 1926; Phyllomedusa megacephala (Miranda-Ribeiro, 1926)

Species of frog

Pithecopus megacephalus, also known as the large-headed leaf frog, is a species of frog in the subfamily Phyllomedusinae. It is endemic to Brazil and is only known from a few peaks in the Espinhaço Mountains in the state of Minas Gerais, where it has been observed 800 meters above sea level.
