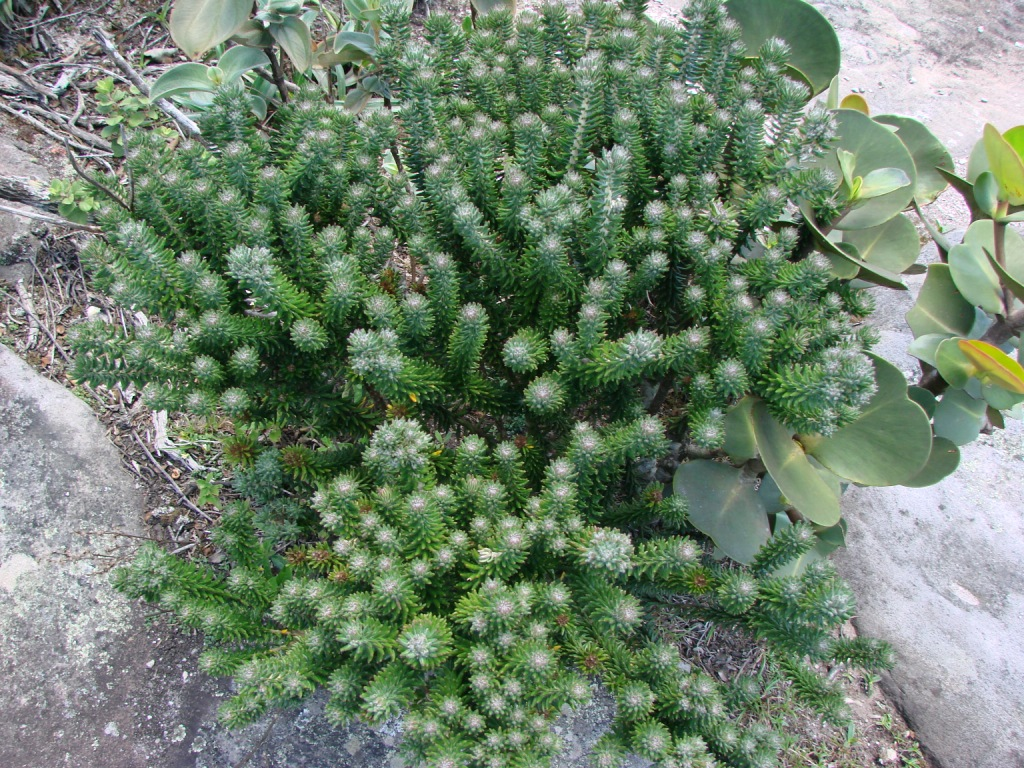

Scientific classification
- Kingdom: Plantae
- Clade: Embryophytes
- Clade: Tracheophytes
- Clade: Spermatophytes
- Clade: Angiosperms
- Clade: Eudicots
- Clade: Asterids
- Order: Asterales
- Family: Asteraceae
- Genus: Lychnophora
- Species: L. triflora

Binomial name
- Lychnophora triflora (Mattf.) H.Rob.

= Lychnophora triflora =

Species of flowering plant

Lychnophora triflora is a species of flowering plant in the family Asteraceae.

== Description ==
The leaves are lanceolate-linear to lanceolate in shape. The leaf apex is either rounded or acute and the base in rounded. The adaxial surface indumentum is glabrous and sericeous.

== Distribution ==
This species has been observed Bahia, Brazil.
