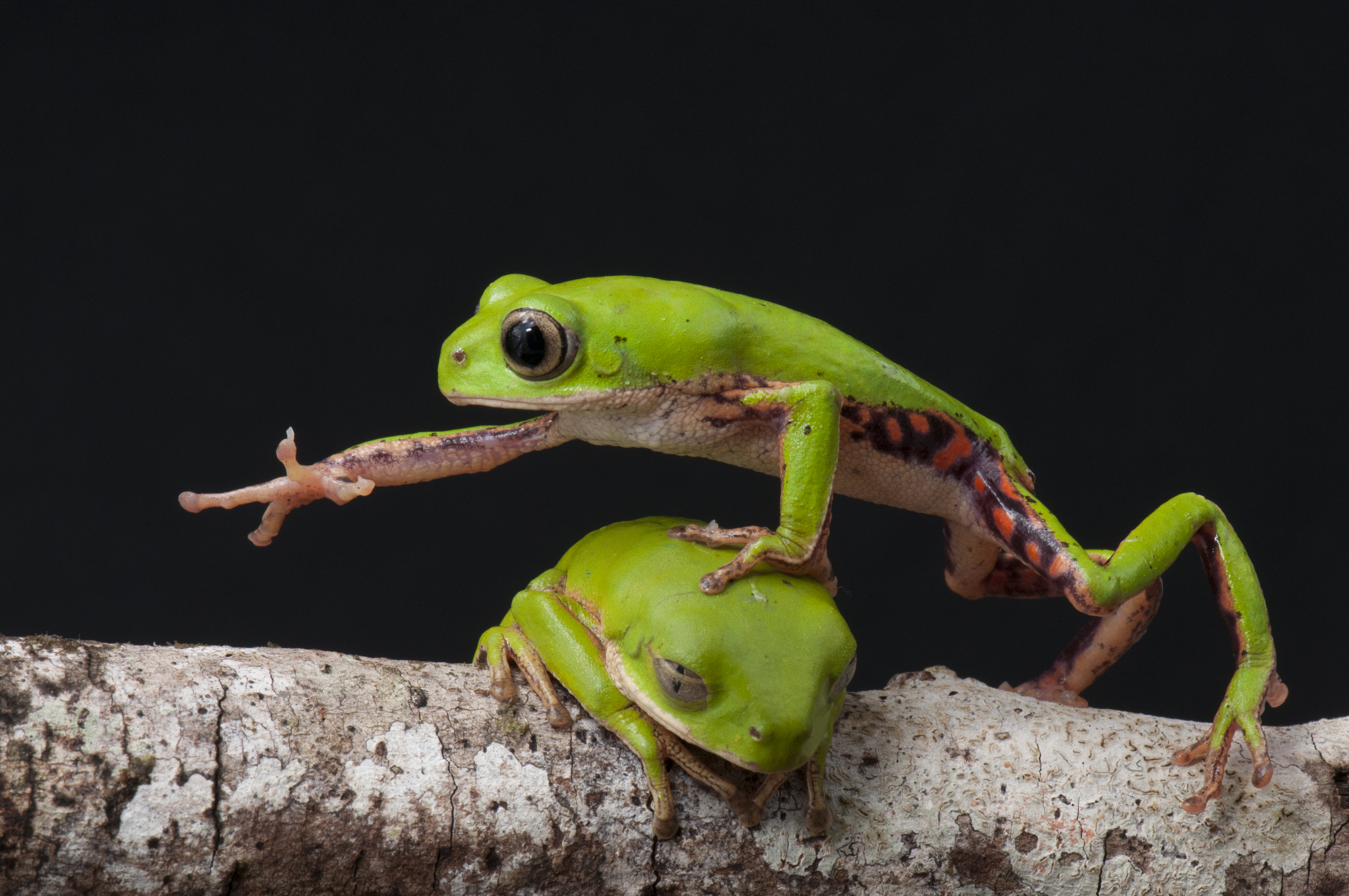

Conservation status
- Least Concern (IUCN 3.1)

Scientific classification
- Kingdom: Animalia
- Phylum: Chordata
- Class: Amphibia
- Order: Anura
- Family: Phyllomedusidae
- Genus: Pithecopus
- Species: P. rohdei

Binomial name
- Pithecopus rohdei Mertens, 1926

Synonyms
- Phyllomedusa rohdei Mertens, 1926; Bradymedusa moschata Miranda-Ribeiro, 1926

= Pithecopus rohdei =

Rohde's leaf frog

Species of frog

Pithecopus rohdei, also known as Rohde's leaf frog, Rohde's frog, and Mertens' leaf frog, is a species of frog in the subfamily Phyllomedusinae. The species was previously placed in the genus Phyllomedusa. The species is endemic to southeastern Brazil and occurs at elevations up to 1000 meters above sea level.

Its natural habitats are subtropical or tropical moist lowland forests, moist savanna, rivers, arable land, pastureland, plantations, rural gardens, urban areas, and heavily degraded former forests.

The species is common, adaptable, and is not considered threatened. It is an opportunistic sit-and-wait predator and preys on spiders, larval butterflies, moths and orthopterans. P. rodhei is able to consume larger prey compared to smaller hylid tree frogs such as Dendropsophus branneri, like due to a larger mouth size. The primary mating season is December to March, however mating at other times have also been reported. Clutches are laid in leaf-made nests on water and eggs fall in underlying streams.
