= Pithecopus centralis =

Conservation status
- Vulnerable (IUCN 3.1)

Scientific classification
- Kingdom: Animalia
- Phylum: Chordata
- Class: Amphibia
- Order: Anura
- Family: Phyllomedusidae
- Genus: Pithecopus
- Species: P. centralis

Binomial name
- Pithecopus centralis (Bokermann, 1965)

Synonyms
- Phyllomedusa centralis Bokermann, 1965

Species of frog

Pithecopus centralis is a species of frog in the subfamily Phyllomedusinae. It is endemic to Brazil, where it has been observed solely above 520 meters above sea level. People have seen it higher than 520 meters above sea level.

This frog lives in drier habitats than other frogs: rocky grasslands. The male frogs have been heard calling near streams. This frog lays eggs during the dry season.

Scientists consider this frog vulnerable to extinction because its habitat is relatively small, fragmented, and subject to further degradation. The frog is now locally extinct in some areas, such as one part of Brazil where people built a reservoir that flooded the frogs' habitat.
