= Lychnophora pseudovillosissima =

Scientific classification
- Kingdom: Plantae
- Clade: Embryophytes
- Clade: Tracheophytes
- Clade: Spermatophytes
- Clade: Angiosperms
- Clade: Eudicots
- Clade: Asterids
- Order: Asterales
- Family: Asteraceae
- Genus: Lychnophora
- Species: L. pseudovillosissima

Binomial name
- Lychnophora pseudovillosissima Semir & Leitão, 1993

Species of flowering plant

Lychnophora pseudovillosissima is a flowering plant in the family Asteraceae.

== Description ==
This species reaches a height of 1 to 3 m. It is a treelet and candelabriform. The stems highly branch at the apex. They are densely lanate, glabrescent, and mamilated. The leaves are alternate, patent, and reflexed at the base of the stem. They are densely imbricate and ascendant near the apex. The petiole is around 1 to 2.4 mm with a lanate indumentum. The lamina (leaf blade) is linear.

The midrib is impressed and is sometimes restricted to the base. The secondary veins are slightly prominent, making the leaf vaguely reticulodromous. The capitula has 3 to 5 florets per capitulum. It is homogamous, discoid, and sesile, slightly appressed at the base. It is interspersed by numerous bracts. The phyllaries are imbricate.

The shaft is 12 to 12.6 mm long and glaborous. The anther is calcarate. The apical appendages are lanceolate, with an acute apex. The cypsela is cylindrical.

== Distribution ==
This species is endemic to Minas Gerais, Brazil.
