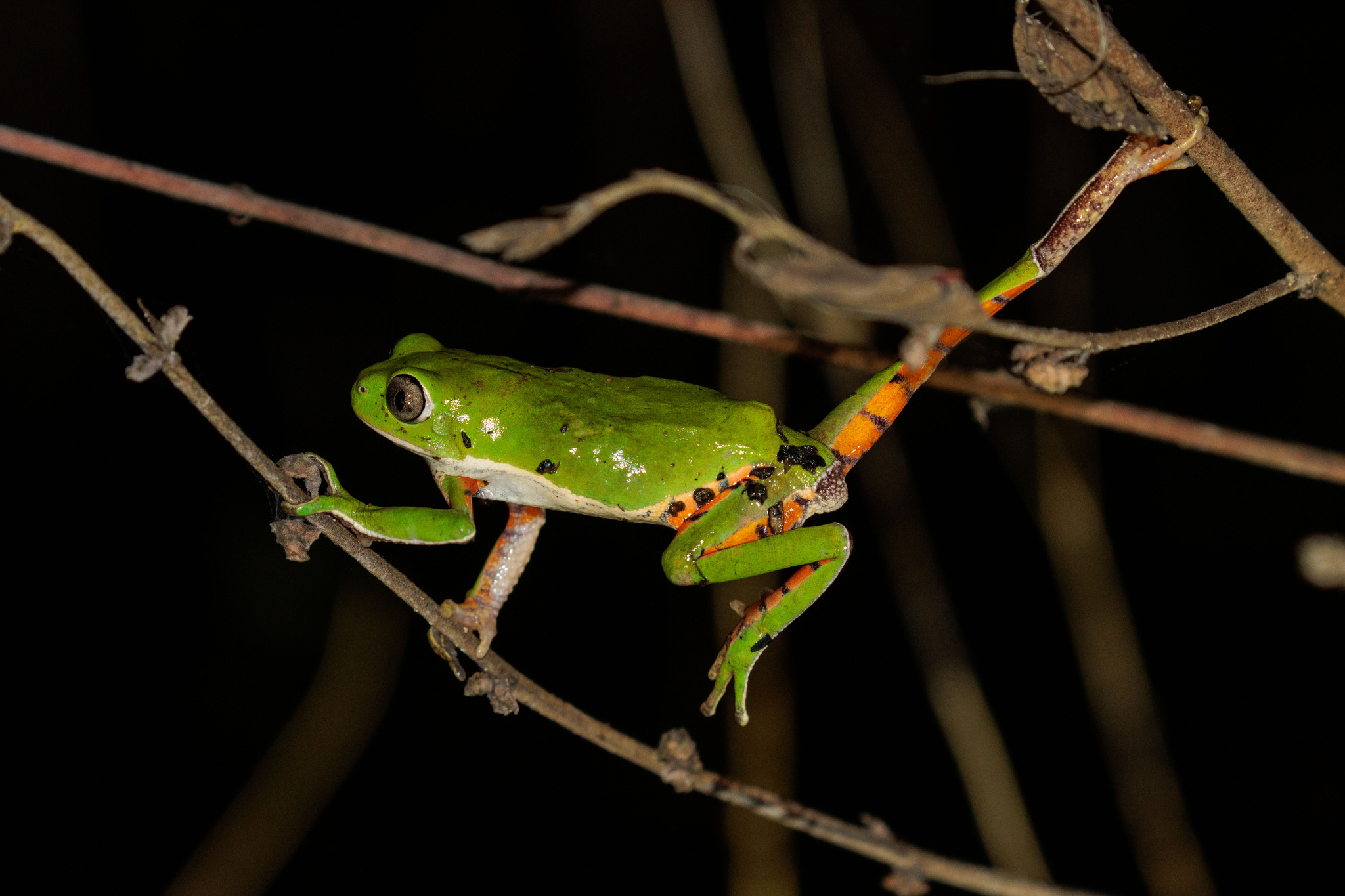

Conservation status
- Least Concern (IUCN 3.1)

Scientific classification
- Kingdom: Animalia
- Phylum: Chordata
- Class: Amphibia
- Order: Anura
- Family: Phyllomedusidae
- Genus: Pithecopus
- Species: P. gonzagai

Binomial name
- Pithecopus gonzagai Andrade, Haga, Ferreira, Recco-Pimentel, Toledo, and Bruschi, 2020

= Pithecopus gonzagai =

Species of amphibian

Pithecopus gonzagai is a species of frog in the family Hylidae, endemic to Brazil. It lives several states north of the Rio São Francisco.

This frog lives in trees in grasslands and shrublands. The frogs call from temporary ponds. The female lays eggs on leaves overhanging the water. The tadpoles fall into the water after they hatch. People have also found this frogs in livestock watering holes.

== Original description ==
- Felipe Silva de Andrade; Isabelle Aquemi Haga; Johnny Sousa Ferreira; Shirlei Maria Recco-Pimentel; Luís Felipe Toledo; Daniel Pacheco Bruschi (2020). "A new cryptic species of Pithecopus (Anura, Phyllomedusidae) in north-eastern Brazil" (PDF). European Journal of Taxonomy (Abstract) (723): 108–134. Bibcode:2020EJTax.723..108D. doi:10.5852/ejt.2020.723.1147.
