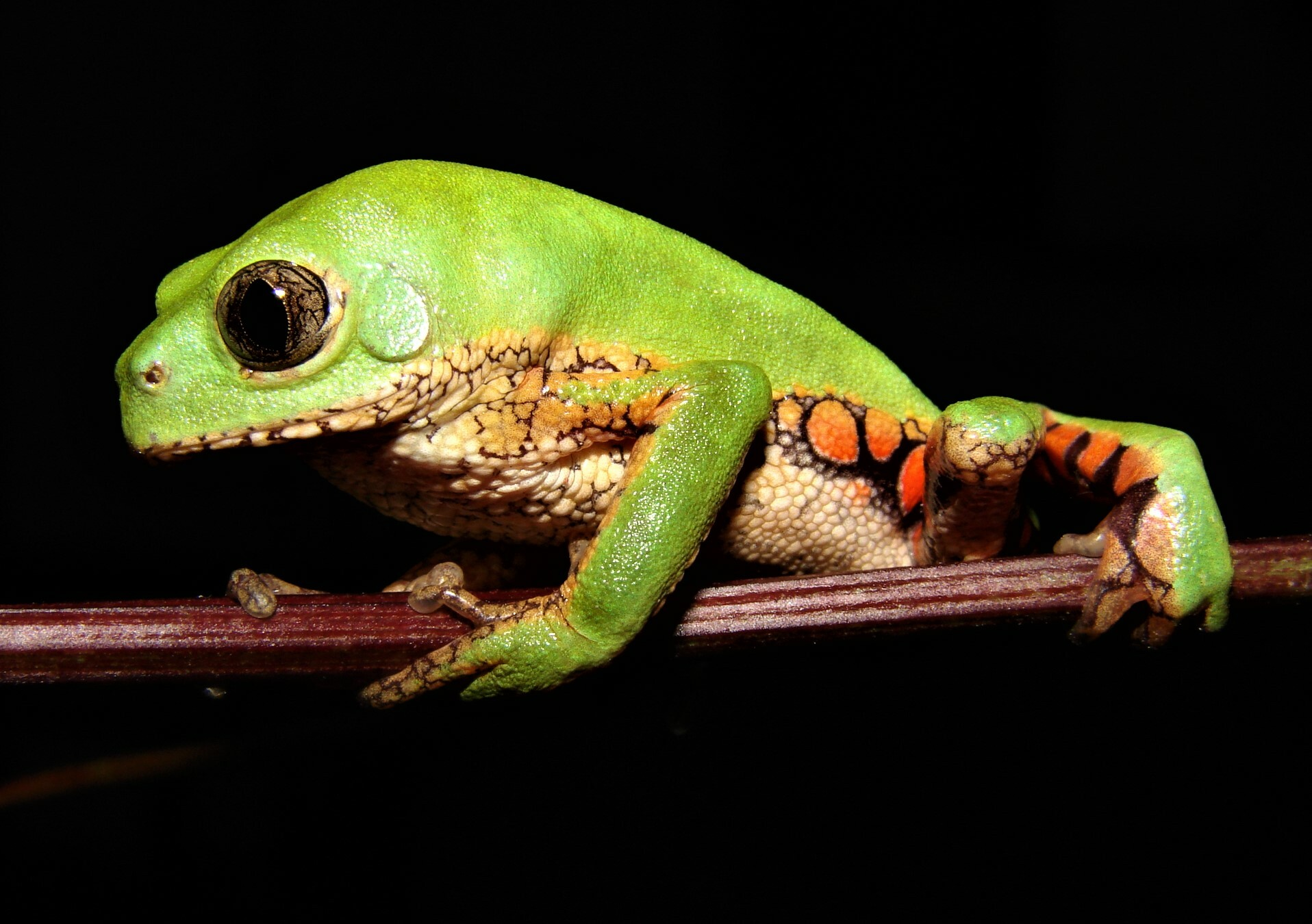

Conservation status
- Least Concern (IUCN 3.1)

Scientific classification
- Kingdom: Animalia
- Phylum: Chordata
- Class: Amphibia
- Order: Anura
- Family: Phyllomedusidae
- Genus: Pithecopus
- Species: P. ayeaye

Binomial name
- Pithecopus ayeaye B. Lutz, 1966

Synonyms
- Phyllomedusa ayeaye Duellman, 1968; Phyllomedusa itacolomi Cramaschi, Cruz, & Feio, 2006

= Pithecopus ayeaye =

Species of frog

Pithecopus ayeaye, also known as the reticulated leaf frog and reticulate leaf frog, is a species of frog in the subfamily Phyllomedusinae. It is endemic to Brazil. P. ayeaye is found in the transition zone between cerrado (tropical woodland-savanna) and Atlantic semi-deciduous forest, laying its eggs on leaves above streams or pools so the tadpoles, when hatched, fall into the water below. This species is under threat from habitat loss resulting from mining activity and fires, and is also affected by pollution from mining and pesticides.

== Description ==
Pithecopus ayeaye is a medium-sized frog that can grow between 28.7 mm to 40 mm long and weigh from 1.89 g to 7.5 g. The dorsal side is a bright green color, and the sides of its body and appendages have a distinctive network of black lines with circular reddish to orange spots. The ventral side is a black to gray color. Tadpoles have long, oval bodies with flattened sides. The end of the tail arcs upwards. Their heads, with large eyes, and bodies are longer than their tails. Their dorsal surface is dark, while their ventral surface is a light gray color.

== Habitat ==
The reticulated leaf frog is native to South America and lives in the Espinhaco, Mantiqueira, and Canastra mountain ranges located in Brazil. The topography includes mountains with rivers running between them. Streams run through the semideciduous forests, which provide water, shade, and protection.

== Call ==
Male frogs produce multiple calls that for specific information or one call that conveys different information. The advertisement call is used to get the attention of females and warn other males who are nearby. The release call is also used when males try to mate with other males or when they are fighting. One study found that at a breeding site, most males use short notes when beginning their calls. As more males join in, they use more complex calls, making short and long notes.

== Reproduction ==
The breeding season is from October to January. Males sit on vegetation beside a stream and call to females. Most P. ayeaye breed on nights with sufficient rainfall to increase the likelihood that fertilization will occur. The tadpoles hatch during November to December. They mature from October to May, and fully mature by June. Female P. ayeaye prefer to deposit their eggs on plants in the families Melastomataceae and Solanaceae. The leaves of those plants have trichomes on them which keep the eggs from drying out and adhering to the leaf.

== Threats ==
Pithecopus ayeaye is currently under threat due to habitat loss. Human-related threats include mining for materials in Brazil, fires that ravage the landscape, and pollution from industries and military operations. The pollutants in the water causes a decline in the population. Ecotourism and urbanization also affect the breeding areas of this species. Non-human threats include climate change and erosion, which causes streams to be filled with sediment.

== Conservation status ==
The International Union for Conservation of Nature previously classified the reticulated leaf frog as critically endangered. However, new ranges of occurrence for P. ayeaye have been found in Minas Gerais, and new genetic evidence has led to the lumping of the former Phyllomedusa itacolomi into this species. Thus, it is no longer considered critically endangered by the Brazilian List of Endangered Species as of 2014, and the IUCN listed the species as Least Concern in 2023.

== Conservation efforts ==
While currently no specific conservation measures target this colourful amphibian, its occurrence in protected areas, such as the Parque Nacional da Serra da Canastra in the state of Minas Gerais and Parque Estadual das Furnas do Bom Jesus in the state of São Paulo, may provide it with some level of protection.
