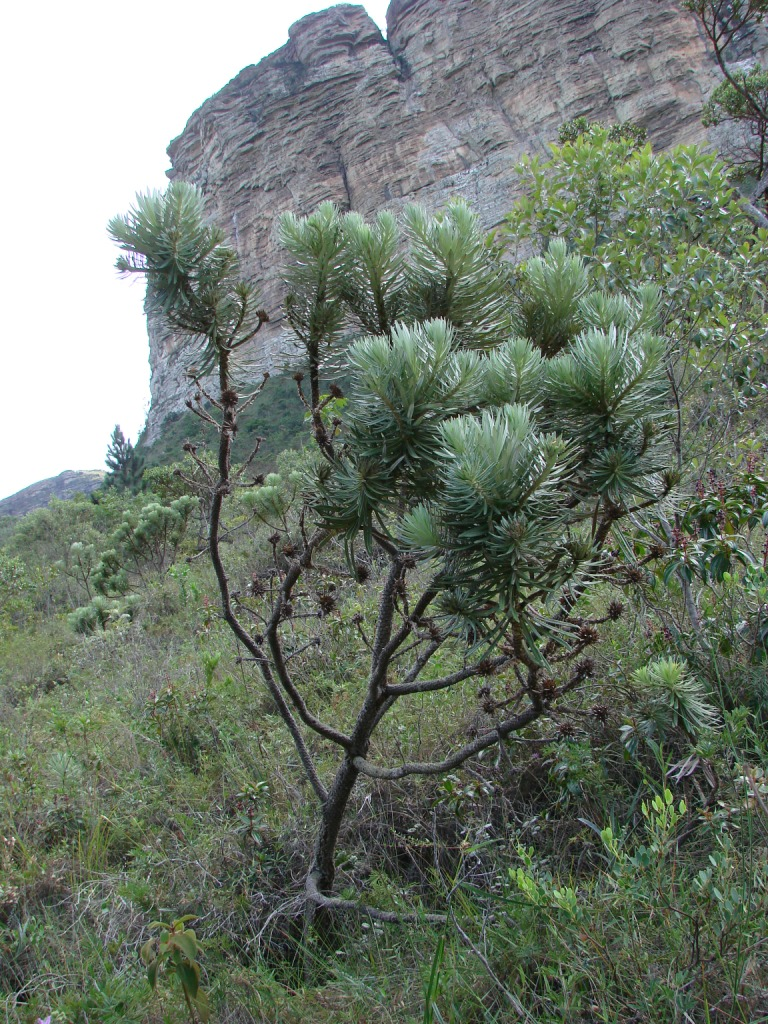
- Lychnophora salicifolia

Scientific classification
- Kingdom: Plantae
- Clade: Embryophytes
- Clade: Tracheophytes
- Clade: Angiosperms
- Clade: Eudicots
- Clade: Asterids
- Order: Asterales
- Family: Asteraceae
- Subfamily: Vernonioideae
- Tribe: Vernonieae
- Genus: Lychnophora; Mart.

Type species
- Lychnophora salicifolia Mart.

Synonyms
- Lychnocephalus Mart. ex DC.; Haplostephium Mart. ex DC.

= Lychnophora =

Genus of flowering plants

Lychnophora is a genus of South American flowering plants in the family Asteraceae.

Species

- Lychnophora albertinioides Gardner
- Lychnophora bahiensis Mattf.
- Lychnophora bishopii H.Rob.
- Lychnophora blanchetii Sch.Bip.
- Lychnophora boquerona (B.L.Turner) H.Rob.
- Lychnophora brunioides Mart.
- Lychnophora crispa Mattf.
- Lychnophora diamantinana Coile & S.B.Jones
- Lychnophora ericoides Mart.
- Lychnophora granmogolensis (Duarte) D.J.N.Hind
- Lychnophora harleyi H.Rob.
- Lychnophora humillima Sch.Bip.
- Lychnophora itatiaiae Wawra
- Lychnophora jeffreyi H.Rob.
- Lychnophora markgravii G.M.Barroso
- Lychnophora morii H.Rob.
- Lychnophora passerina (Mart. ex DC.) Gardner
- Lychnophora phylicifolia DC.
- Lychnophora pohlii Sch.Bip.
- Lychnophora pseudovillosissima Semir & Leitão
- Lychnophora ramosissima Gardner
- Lychnophora regis H.Rob.
- Lychnophora reticulata Gardner
- Lychnophora riedelii Sch.Bip.
- Lychnophora rosmarinifolia Mart.
- Lychnophora salicifolia Mart.
- Lychnophora santosii H.Rob.
- Lychnophora saxosa Krasch.
- Lychnophora sellowii Sch.Bip.
- Lychnophora souzae H.Rob.
- Lychnophora staavioides Mart.
- Lychnophora tomentosa (Mart. ex DC.) Sch.Bip.
- Lychnophora trichocarpha (Spreng.) Spreng.
- Lychnophora trichocarpha (Spreng.) Spreng. ex Sch.Bip.
- Lychnophora triflora (Mattf.) H.Rob.
- Lychnophora uniflora Sch.Bip.
- Lychnophora van-isschoti Heckel
- Lychnophora villosissima Mart.
