= Red-eyed frog =

Red-eyed frog may refer to:

- Red-eyed stream frog (Duellmanohyla uranochroa), a frog in the family Hylidae found in Costa Rica and Panama
- Red-eyed tree frog (disambiguation)
  - Agalychnis callidryas, native to Central America and Colombia
  - Agalychnis taylori, native to Mexico and Central America
  - Ranoidea chloris, native to Australia
