= Red frog =

Red frog may refer to:

== Frogs ==
- Red rain frog (Scaphiophryne gottlebei), a Madagascan frog in the family Microhylidae
- Red stream frog (Limnonectes doriae), a frog in the family Dicroglossidae found in Southeast Asia
- Red tree frog (Leptopelis rufus), a frog in the family Hyperoliidae found in many African countries
- Red-eared frog (Hylarana erythraea), a frog in the family Ranidae found in Southeast Asia
- Little red frog (disambiguation)
- Red-eyed frog (disambiguation)
- Red-legged frog (disambiguation)

== Other uses ==
- Red Frog Events, a privately owned event production company based in Chicago
- Red Frogs, an Australian volunteer-based support network for university students and school-leavers
