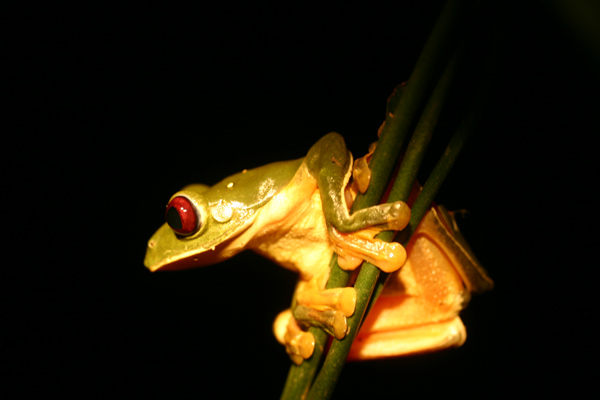

Conservation status
- Least Concern (IUCN 3.1)
- CITES Appendix II (CITES)

Scientific classification
- Kingdom: Animalia
- Phylum: Chordata
- Class: Amphibia
- Order: Anura
- Family: Hylidae
- Genus: Agalychnis
- Species: A. saltator

Binomial name
- Agalychnis saltator Taylor, 1955

Synonyms
- Phyllomedusa saltator (Taylor, 1955)

= Agalychnis saltator =

Species of amphibian

Agalychnis saltator, also known as the parachuting red-eyed leaf frog and misfit leaf frog, is a species of frog in the subfamily Phyllomedusinae. It is found in the Caribbean lowlands from north-eastern Honduras to eastern-central Costa Rica at elevations of 15–1,300 m (49–4,265 ft) asl.

== Description ==
Male Agalychnis saltator measure 38–44 mm (1.5–1.7 in) and females 52–62 mm (2.0–2.4 in) in snout–vent length. They have distinctive red eyes with vertical pupils. The dorsum is light or dark leaf green with bluish purple flanks. They have large suction disks and extensive webbing between the fingers and toes.

== Habitat and behaviour ==
Agalychnis saltator are nocturnal and arboreal. They inhabit lowland and montane humid and wet forests, and to a lesser extent, adjacent premontane wet forests and rainforests. They live in tree canopies, but descend to temporary pools to reproduce. Male frog can leap from considerable heights to plants on the mating sites, extending its limbs and spreading out the skin between its fingers and toes, hence the name "parachuting frog".

== Reproduction ==
Agalychnis saltator are explosive breeders that breed after heavy rains. A single breeding aggregation may contain 25–400 frogs (typically 100–200), hanging on vines that overhang temporary ponds in forested areas, and on marsh vegetation (e.g. Spathiphyllum). Most individuals in the aggregation are couples in amplexus, with one female frog being accompanied by one to four males. The eggs are laid amidst mosses covering the vines, but are very vulnerable to predation at this stage.

Agalychnis saltator males have also been observed in amplexus with Agalychnis callidryas females. The eggs from such matings are infertile.

== Conservation ==
Agalychnis saltator has a naturally fragmented distribution. It is not particularly common, but it is regularly seen on breeding sites. It is locally suffering from further fragmentation of its habitat because of deforestation from agricultural development and logging. However, it is not threatened on the whole.

Agalychnis saltator is collected for illegal pet trade. It is listed in CITES Appendix II.
