= Little frog =

Little frog may refer to:

- Little grass frog (Pseudacris ocularis) a frog in the family Hylidae endemic to the Southeastern United States
- Little spiny frog (Quasipaa exilispinosa), a frog in the family Dicroglossidae found in southern China including Hong Kong
- Taiwan little pygmy frog (Micryletta steinegeri), a frog in the family Microhylidae endemic to central and southern Taiwan
- Little Frog Mountain, a mountain in Tennessee, United States

== See also ==
- Little red frog (disambiguation)
