= Red-eyed tree frog =

Red-eyed tree frog is a common name for several frog species:

- Agalychnis callidryas, native to Central America and Colombia
- Agalychnis taylori, native to Mexico and Central America
- Ranoidea chloris, native to Australia

Red-Eyed Tree Frogs utilize vibrations to communicate with other red-eyed tree frogs and as a way to sense danger. These frogs use vibrations, even before they are born, to sense danger to escape snakes which means that they are born prematurely. Premature tadpoles, however, are not guaranteed survival as they could be eaten by predators later or their own species can eat them. In fact, some tadpoles will eat late-hatched eggs as well. Equally important, vibrations are used to communicate between frogs. An example of this can be seen with male frogs. For male frogs, vibrations can tell how big the male frog is.
