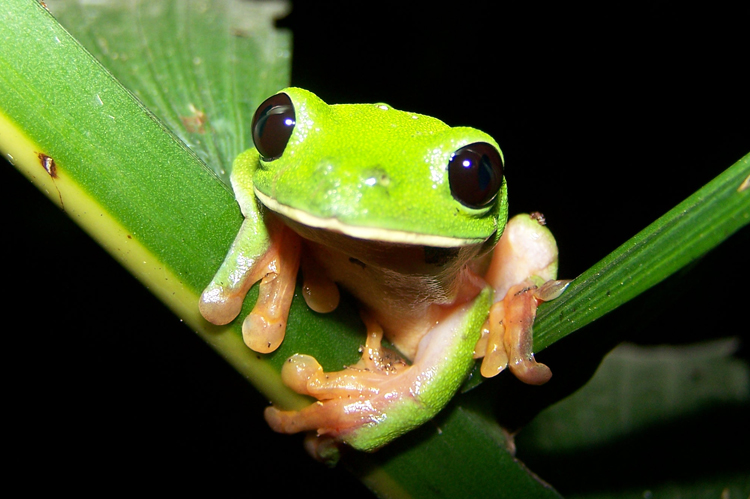

Conservation status
- Least Concern (IUCN 3.1)
- CITES Appendix II (CITES)

Scientific classification
- Kingdom: Animalia
- Phylum: Chordata
- Class: Amphibia
- Order: Anura
- Family: Hylidae
- Genus: Agalychnis
- Species: A. moreletii

Binomial name
- Agalychnis moreletii (Duméril, 1853)

Synonyms
- Hyla moreletii Duméril, 1853; Hyla holochlora Salvin, 1860

= Morelet's tree frog =

Species of amphibian

Morelet's tree frog (Agalychnis moreletii), also known as black-eyed leaf frog and popeye hyla, is a species of frog in the subfamily Phyllomedusinae. It is found in Belize, El Salvador, Guatemala, Honduras, and Mexico.

Its natural habitats are subtropical or tropical moist lowland forest, subtropical or tropical moist montane forest, freshwater marshes, and intermittent freshwater marshes.

== Description ==
Physically, Morelet's tree frog has a similar form to the related red-eyed tree frog (A. callidryas), with which its range overlaps in areas, albeit slightly smaller, and with a more uniformly-green body, dark black eyes, and a red or pink underbelly.

== Distribution and habitat ==
Morelet's tree frog primarily inhabits moist, subtropical lowland forests, montane or cloud forests, or wetland habitats with sufficient tree cover. The species is found in the middle of Central America, from southern Mexico to NW Honduras, as well as Belize, El Salvador and Guatemala. In Mexico, they have been observed on both the Atlantic and Pacific slopes of Veracruz, particularly in the hills around Córdoba, even being found as far north as Cuetzalan, Puebla. On the Mexican Pacific coast, they have been found near Acapulco, Guerrero, and are also known from the states of Chiapas and Oaxaca. Elsewhere, the species has been observed in Celaque National Park (Honduras), the Maya Mountains (Belize), most of the Pacific slopes of Guatemala's hills, and near the Santa Ana volcano (El Salvador) and the Pacific slopes around San Salvador. They can live in untouched or disturbed habitats, and will breed in temporary or permanent bodies of water.

== Reproduction and lifecycle ==
They have an extended breeding season during the summer months. When choosing a mate, the females tend to search for the males with the best sounding mating call. The males whose mating calls are the longest and have the most frequent pulses in pitch are the ones who get chosen by the females. They deposit clutches of 50 to 75 eggs on vegetation or rocks over water. The eggs of the Morelet's tree frog have a green pigment and when they hatch, the larvae fall into the water to complete their development into frogs.

== Conservation ==
Morelet's tree frog are abundant within its range and are kept as pets internationally. Industry and agriculture are thought to be the main causes of lowland montane forest destruction. The population of Morelet's tree frogs are also being affected due to a disease called Chytridiomycosis, which is an infectious disease that kills amphibians. Chytridiomycosis and habitat destruction are projected to cause the population to decline over 80% in the next 10 years. In some regions, the frogs have gone extinct completely. For example, a study done in 2004, has claimed that Morelet's tree frog may be extirpated from the region of Southern Mexico.

Their survival is dependent upon several factors due to their human and disease-caused population decline. Some conservation measures are in place, while others are still in need of implementation or research. Several protected parks have been created to curb habitat destruction in areas of Central America and Mexico. Taxonomic research is currently in place to further understand the population's status. More data are needed, however, on a temporal and spatial scale to determine trends in the population of Morelet's tree frogs.
