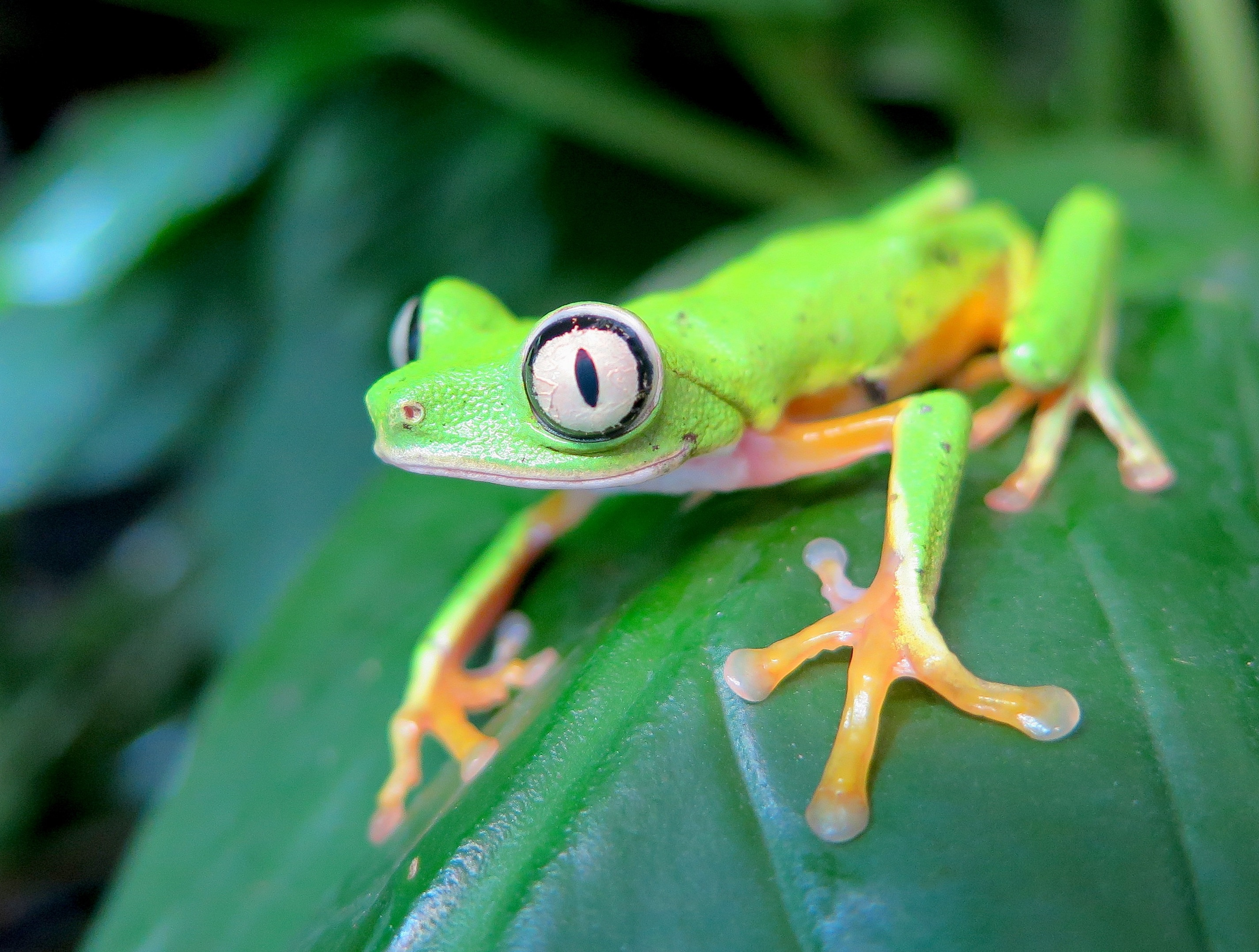

Conservation status
- Critically Endangered (IUCN 3.1)
- CITES Appendix II

Scientific classification
- Kingdom: Animalia
- Phylum: Chordata
- Class: Amphibia
- Order: Anura
- Family: Phyllomedusidae
- Genus: Agalychnis
- Species: A. lemur

Binomial name
- Agalychnis lemur (Boulenger, 1882)

Synonyms
- Phyllomedusa lemur Boulenger, 1882; Hylomantis lemur (Boulenger, 1882); Phyllomedusa lemur (Boulenger, 1882)

= Agalychnis lemur =

Species of amphibian

Agalychnis lemur, the lemur leaf frog or lemur frog, is a species of frog in the subfamily Phyllomedusinae. It is found in Costa Rica, Panama, and adjacent northwestern Colombia. It is classed as Critically Endangered and threatened by the fungal disease chytridiomycosis.

== Habitat ==
The lemur leaf frog lives in tropical mid-elevation pre-montane rainforest between 440 and 1600 metres ASL. Costa Rica is currently host to three sites in which this species resides. They are Fila Asuncion (an abandoned farm 15 km southwest of Limón); a forested area near Parque National Barbilla; and Guayacán in Limón Province. Of these three locations Fila Asuncion is the only one known to have a large breeding population.

== Biology ==
=== Morphological characteristics ===
During the day the lemur leaf frog is a vibrant green but changes to brown at night. This characteristic enhances its ability to camouflage in the day and hunt at night. The lemur leaf frog is a slender species. It has no inter-digital webbing on the front or hind feet. In the past its lack of webbing suggested it belonged in the genus Phyllomedusa. However, recent analysis of mitochondrial and nuclear gene sequences has shown the species was found to genetically closer to species of the genus Agalychnis to which it now belongs This species also displays sexual dimorphism, with the females being larger than males. Adult females range approximately from 40–45 mm in length by 15–20 mm in width across the abdomen in resting position, while males range from approximately 30–35 mm in length by 10–15 mm in width across the abdomen. Females on average weigh roughly 4 grams, with males weighing only about 2 grams.

=== Activities ===
Lemur leaf frogs are mainly nocturnal, resting on the undersides of leaves during the day.

=== Diet ===
Details of the specific diet of lemur leaf frogs have not been reported but is primarily a wide variety of insects.

=== Reproduction ===
==== Breeding ====
The lemur leaf frog participates in "prolonged breeding" that takes place continuously during the rainy seasons, primarily observed during spring or summer. These species engage in ritual calling. The male lemur frog intones a series of clicks to call to the female.

==== Eggs ====
Lemur leaf frogs produce up to 20 eggs at a time. They are usually deposited under resting leaves overhanging a water supply. These eggs are bluish-green or grey encased in the typical jelly mass. The lemur leaf frog lays eggs terrestrially, on vegetation or roots overhanging the water. When the eggs hatch the tadpoles drop into the small pools of water below. Depending on the temperature, food, and water supply tadpoles will usually drop into the water at around 7 days and the metamorphosis, 90–150 days.

=== Hatching ===
The tadpoles can prematurely hatch when there is danger that they could be eaten by predators. Vibrations from predators or from rain causes the tadpoles to hatch prematurely, in order to escape attack or so they can be washed into water below.

==== Tadpoles ====
Preserved tadpoles are bluish-gray with an opaque body while the dorsal and ventral fins are transparent. However, in life their overall color is greenish gray with a white abdomen. Tadpoles in earlier stages are smaller, slender, and less pigmented, and some even show an evident dark stripe between the eyes and nostrils.

== Population ==
Although the lemur leaf frog was once considered a common species in Costa Rica it has declined. With more than an 80% decrease in population in a period of 10 years it is now closely being monitored in Panama where it is still abundant in the lower elevations of central and eastern parts of the country. However, there have been no further reports on the populations of these lemur frogs endemic to Colombia. Due to the marked drop in population of the species, it has been listed as critically endangered by the International Union for Conservation of Nature since 2004. Related causes that may be linked to the disappearance of these frogs are chytridiomycosis (a disease affecting only amphibians contacting with zoospores of the Chytrid fungus) and general loss of habitat from deforestation.

== Resistance to chytridiomycosis ==
Chytrid fungus has been plaguing amphibians globally resulting in a number of amphibian extinctions. Researchers are currently using non-invasive imaging technology to better understand how a specific species of tree frogs in Central America are proving resilience to this fungus. Scientist are attributing tree frog's ability to withstand the deadly fungus to their unusual skin which allows the frogs to bask in the hot sunlight boosting their temperatures adequately enough to kill off the fungus. While typically a frog's long exposure to sunlight would dry out its skin, this species of tree frog in Costa Rica thrives under the high temperature conditions. Scientists believe these tree frogs are able to thrive under these harsh conditions, which normally negatively affect frogs because of their skins ability to reflect the sunlight, regulating their core temperature, yet maintaining enough heat to kill off the chytrid fungus. The antimicrobial skin peptides in the skin of lemur leaf frogs have shown to be a strong preventative measure for chytrid fungus, in particular Batrachochytrium dendrobatidis.

In 2004 a sample of peptides from nine different adult amphibians in Omar Torrijos National Park, Panama were taken to test for susceptibility to chytridiomycosis. Of the 9 species tested the lemur leaf frog ranked third in immunologic resistance with a mean of 15% in inhibition of pathogen growth and peptide renewal. The strongest (Xenopus Laevis) had a mean of 65% more than four times that of the lemur leaf frog. Although the lemur leaf frog shows some resilience to chytridiomycosis it is not completely immune. In a different study following that, it was predicted that this species could survive chytridiomycosis because they contained dermaseptin-L1 and phylloseptin-L1 peptides which contained resistance to gram-negative and gram-positive bacteria. While there has been survivors, the appearance of chytridiomycosis still caused population decline despite their antimicrobial skin peptides. This shows that in-vitro studies may not represent what actually happens in living organisms.

By taking skin secretions of lemur leaf frogs, scientists tested to conclude that the skin peptides contained phylloseptin-L1 and dermaseptinL1 with cytolytic activities in order to combat bacteria and fungus. For these reasons, at Omar Torrijos National Park, it was predicated that the species would be able to survive the appearance of chytridiomycosis. While there have been survivors, a large population decrease was caused from chytridiomycosis despite the anti-fungi properties of their skin peptides. This shows that the results that are taken in a study may be different than what happens in real life.

== Conservation ==
In Costa Rica, lemur leaf frogs are currently only found in two remaining locations. Genetic testing of the mitochondrial DNA of the lemur leaf frog populations show that those frogs are distinct from the Panamanian frogs. This highlighted the need for the separate conservation of the Costa Rican populations. The first in situ conservation effort for the lemur leaf frog was started in 2003. The in-situ aspect of the project was carried out by the Costa Rican Amphibian Research Center, consisting of introducing tadpoles to artificial ponds every year, gradually increasing the wild population of the frogs inside of the reserve. The project has been so successful that the frogs are spreading out from the center.

It was first successfully breeding ex-situ for the Costa Rican frogs was at Manchester Museum's Vivarium, where an official conservation project for the Costa Rican population (Project Lemur Frog) was established in 1999. Work at Manchester Museum with the species has involved supporting them in Costa Rica, highlighting the species' plight to the public, DNA research work to genetically fingerprint the species which allowed for the creation of an official studbook for this species. Manchester University has also developed a global environmental education programme based on the species that extends to the countries of origin. The Atlanta Botanical Garden and El Valle, Panama have also bred the Panamanian form of the species in captivity and been highly successful.

=== Problems and successes ===
Given that the population of the lemur leaf frog is on the decline in Central America, there are now clear efforts in place to help conserve the species.

The conservation effort at the El Valle Amphibian Conservation Center (EVACC) in El Valle de Antón, Panama provides in-country ex-situ support for amphibians that have the greatest potential risk of extinction from chytridiomycosis. The lemur leaf frog falls into this category and is being supported at El Valle. During 2006–2007, the water – through means of filtration from tap sources – in which they were living turned out to be soft and acidic. Ultraviolet B spectrum lighting was provided on all tanks for two hours daily via modified halogen bulbs. From 2006 to 2008, their diet consisted of wild caught invertebrates, including: katydids, termites, fruit flies, and isopods. In the necropsy of the lemur leaf frog that had died after 90 days, the Captive-Bred Juveniles (CBJ), (ones that included animals resulting from captive breeding) were compared with wild-caught Long-Term Residents (LTR). The results showed that the cause of death for the lemur leaf frog at EVACC was through poor nutritional condition and osteodystrophy, with a very small number contracting lungworm infection and squamous metaplasia. A stumbling block to the conservation of lemur leaf frogs at El Valle in Panama has been its tendency to develop a vitamin A defiency when given insect-based diets in captivity. Lesions develop shortly after the vitamin A deficiency comes into effect. The tongue of the lemur leaf frog is prominently affected by squamous metaplasia. Other associated problems occur elsewhere, such as in the oral and nasal cavities, the esophagus, stomach, reproductive tract and bladder. Further research is required to evaluate these problems.

At Manchester Museum and Bristol Zoo in the UK, and Nordens Ark in Sweden, they have established a diverse 'safety net' population of Costa Rican lemur leaf frogs. A studbook has now been established and healthy animals are being bred and maintained within the programme as a backup to the wild populations in Costa Rica. This, together with the In-situ conservation work being carried out may secure Costa Rican populations of the species for the future.

== Sources ==
- Morelle, Rebecca. "Sun-loving Frogs Aid Fungus Fight." BBC News. BBC, 24 June 2008. Web. 29 Oct. 2015.
- Conlon, J., Woodhams, D., Raza, H., Coquet, L., Leprince, J., Jouenne, T., . . . Rollins-Smith, L. (2007). Peptides with differential cytolytic activity from skin secretions of the lemur leaf frog Hylomantis lemur (Hylidae: Phyllomedusinae). Toxicon, 498–506. doi:10.1016/j.toxicon.2007.04.017
- Gomez-Mestre, I., Wiens, J., & Warkentin, K. (2008). Evolution Of Adaptive Plasticity: Risk-Sensitive Hatching In Neotropical Leaf-Breeding Treefrogs. Ecological Monographs, 78(2), 205–224. doi:10.1890/07-0529.1
