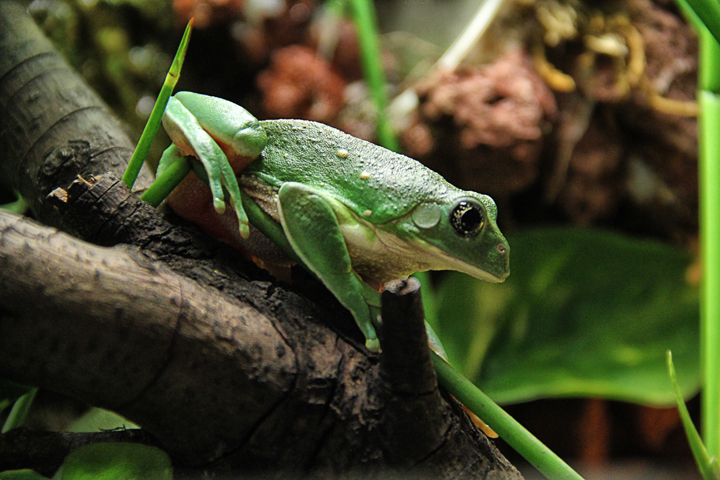

Conservation status
- Least Concern (IUCN 3.1)

Scientific classification
- Kingdom: Animalia
- Phylum: Chordata
- Class: Amphibia
- Order: Anura
- Family: Hylidae
- Genus: Agalychnis
- Species: A. dacnicolor

Binomial name
- Agalychnis dacnicolor (Cope, 1864)

Synonyms
- Pachymedusa dacnicolor (Cope, 1864)

= Agalychnis dacnicolor =

Species of amphibian

Agalychnis dacnicolor, the Mexican leaf frog, is a species of frog in the subfamily Phyllomedusinae. It is endemic to Mexico.

The adult grows up to 100 mm in length, with an overall dorsal colour of green with scattered white spots. The underbelly is white with legs and digits of orange. This species has enlarged toes and golden eyes, and females are larger than males. They eat mainly insects and are nocturnal, spending the day in sheltered burrows or under stones or logs.

Its natural habitats are subtropical or tropical dry forests, intermittent rivers, intermittent freshwater marshes, water storage areas, and ponds. It is not considered a threatened species by the IUCN.

Breeding takes place near ponds and swamps. The eggs are laid in clumps above the water on foliage. The tadpoles fall into the water after hatching.
