= Agalychnis terranova =

Conservation status
- Near Threatened (IUCN 3.1)
- CITES Appendix II

Scientific classification
- Kingdom: Animalia
- Phylum: Chordata
- Class: Amphibia
- Order: Anura
- Family: Phyllomedusidae
- Genus: Agalychnis
- Species: A. terranova

Binomial name
- Agalychnis terranova Rivera-Correa, Duarte-Cubides, Rueda-Almonacid, and Daza-R., 2013

Species of frog

Agalychnis terranova is a species of frog endemic to Colombia. It has been observed between 240 and 900 meters above sea level.

The adult frog measures 4.7 cm snout-vent length. The female frogs are larger than the male frogs. This frog has green, warty skin on its dorsum. This frog resembles other frogs in the genus Agalychnis excepting that its sides are orange with white spots rather than blue. This frog is nocturnal. The tonal advertisement call is reported to be 0.52 seconds long at a frequency of 1.74 Hz, which is similar to its sister species, A. callidry.

This species is classified as near threatened. Its numbers are threatened by habitat loss, damming, habitat fragmentation, and mining activity.
