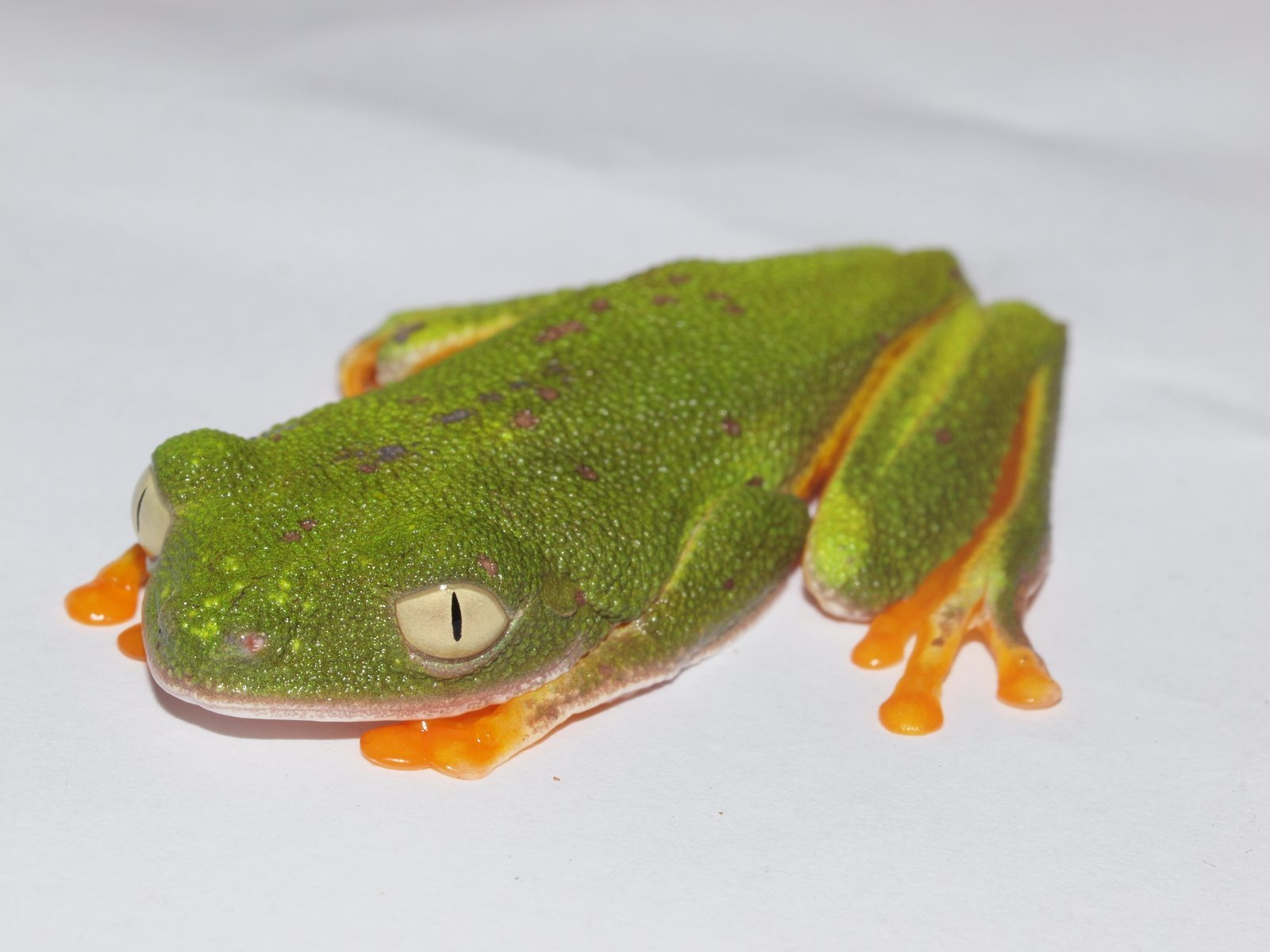

Conservation status
- Least Concern (IUCN 3.1)

Scientific classification
- Kingdom: Animalia
- Phylum: Chordata
- Class: Amphibia
- Order: Anura
- Family: Phyllomedusidae
- Genus: Agalychnis
- Species: A. hulli

Binomial name
- Agalychnis hulli (Duellman and Mendelson, 1995)

Synonyms
- Phyllomedusa hulli Duellman and Mendelson, 1995; Hylomantis hulli (Duellman and Mendelson, 1995)

= Agalychnis hulli =

Species of frog

Agalychnis hulli, the cat-eyed frog, is a species of frog in the subfamily Phyllomedusinae. It is found in north-eastern Peru and in adjacent regions of Ecuador.

Its natural habitats are lowland tropical rainforests at elevations up to 450 m (1,480 ft) above sea level. It deposits its eggs on leaves overhanging temporary ponds, in which the tadpoles later develop. It is an uncommon species that is suffering from habitat loss in parts of its range. It is present in a number of protected areas.
