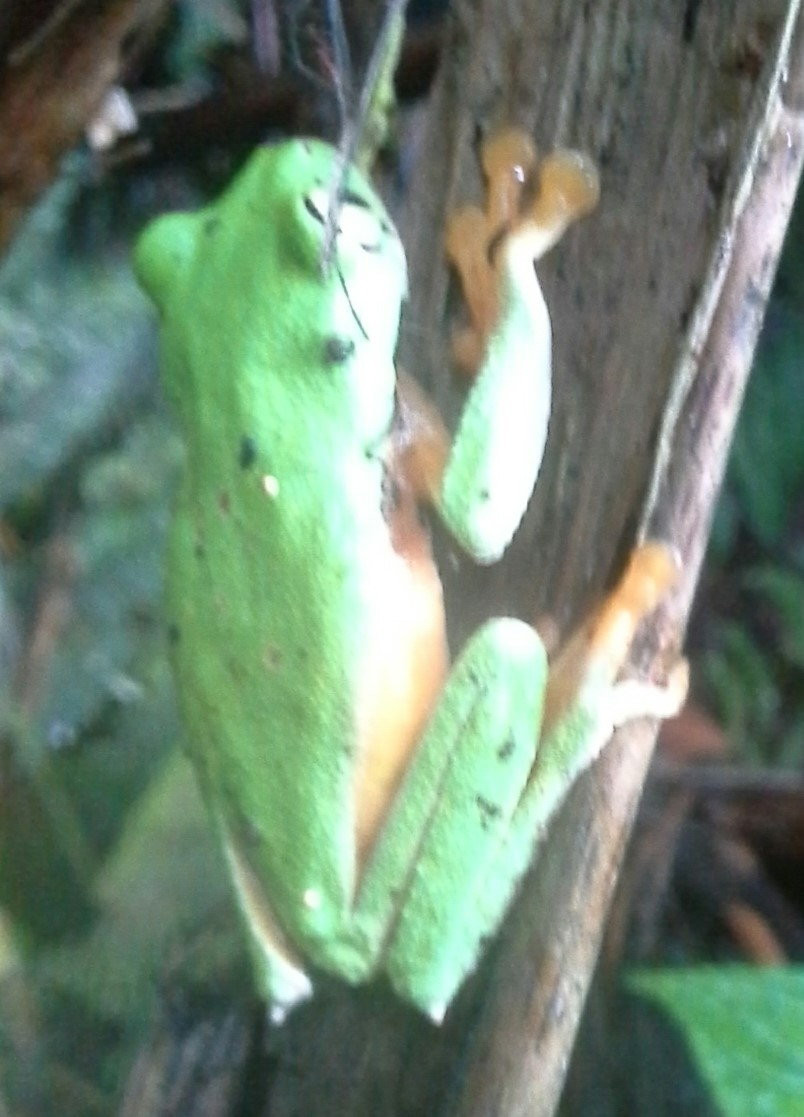

Conservation status
- Least Concern (IUCN 3.1)

Scientific classification
- Kingdom: Animalia
- Phylum: Chordata
- Class: Amphibia
- Order: Anura
- Family: Phyllomedusidae
- Genus: Agalychnis
- Species: A. buckleyi

Binomial name
- Agalychnis buckleyi (Boulenger, 1882)

Synonyms
- Hyla porifera Andersson, 1945; Phyllomedusa loris Boulenger, 1912; Hylomantis buckleyi (Boulenger, 1882)

= Agalychnis buckleyi =

Species of frog

Agalychnis buckleyi, or warty leaf frog, is a species of frog in the subfamily Phyllomedusinae. It is found in Colombia and Ecuador. Its natural habitats are subtropical or tropical moist lowland forests, subtropical or tropical moist montane forests, and freshwater marshes. It is threatened by habitat loss.
