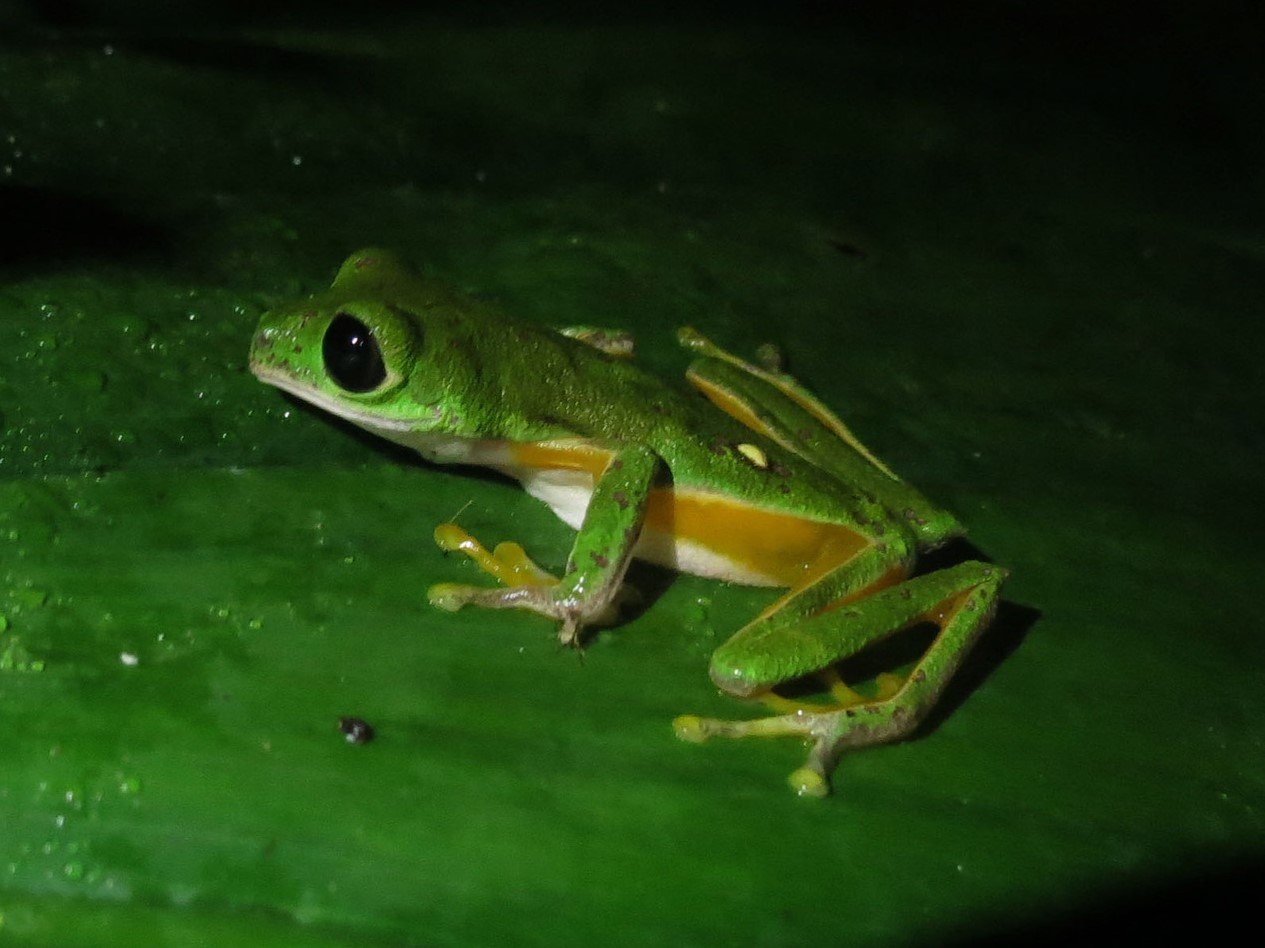

Conservation status
- Least Concern (IUCN 3.1)

Scientific classification
- Kingdom: Animalia
- Phylum: Chordata
- Class: Amphibia
- Order: Anura
- Family: Phyllomedusidae
- Genus: Agalychnis
- Species: A. psilopygion

Binomial name
- Agalychnis psilopygion (Cannatella, 1980)

Synonyms
- Hylomantis psilopygion (Cannatella, 1980)

= Agalychnis psilopygion =

Species of frog

Agalychnis psilopygion is a species of frog in the subfamily Phyllomedusinae. It is found in southern Colombia and north-western Ecuador. It has been observed between 100 and 500 meters above sea level.

This frog lives in mature forests. The female frog lays eggs on leaves over water. When the eggs hatch, the tadpoles fall into the water.

Scientists classify this frog as in least concern of extinction because of its large range, but because it lives in mature forests, it may suffer more from habitat loss than other frogs.

Description: A medium-sized frog that, like other tree frogs (family Hylidae), is characterized by expanded toe discs and proportionally large eyes. Heel with calcar; webbed toes.
