= Agalychnis medinae =

Conservation status
- Endangered (IUCN 3.1)

Scientific classification
- Kingdom: Animalia
- Phylum: Chordata
- Class: Amphibia
- Order: Anura
- Family: Hylidae
- Genus: Agalychnis
- Species: A. medinae

Binomial name
- Agalychnis medinae (Funkhouser, 1962)

Synonyms
- Phyllomedusa medinae Funkhouser, 1962; Phyllomedusa medinai — unjustified emendation; Hylomantis medinai (Funkhouser, 1962)

Species of frog

Agalychnis medinai, also known as the Rancho Grande leaf frog, is a species of frog in the subfamily Phyllomedusinae. It is endemic to the central part of the Venezuelan Coastal Range.

Agalychnis medinai inhabits cloud forests at elevations of 975–1,447 m (3,199–4,747 ft) above sea level. It is a rarely spotted arboreal frog, usually seen in temporal or permanents pools, its breeding habitat, during the wet season. It can also live in secondary forests near artificial bodies of water. It is threatened by forest loss and extraction of surface water. Its range overlaps with the Yurubí National Park and, at least formerly, with the Henri Pittier National Park, where its type locality is located – it has not been sighted there during the last decades.
