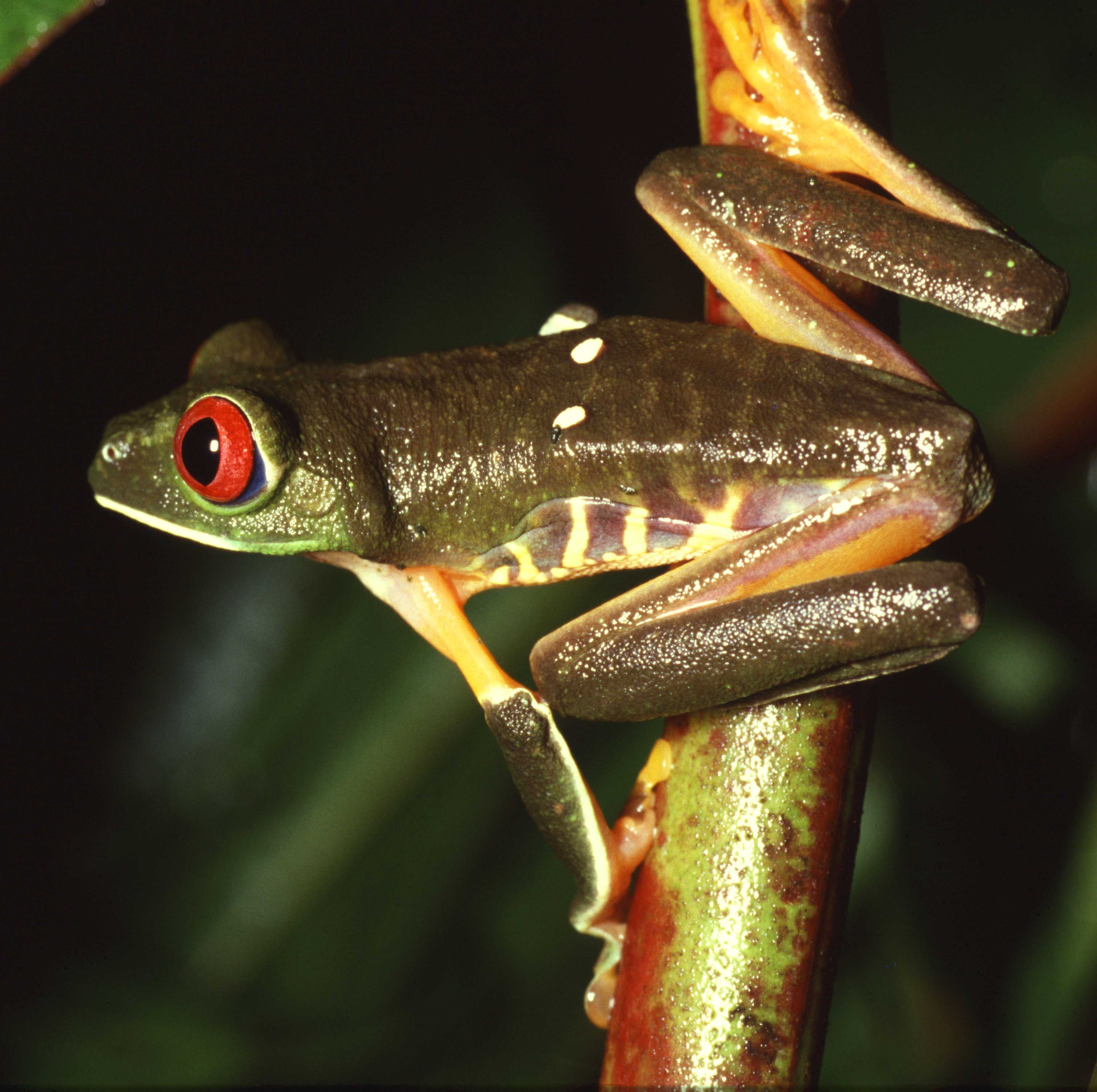
- Red-eyed tree frog (Agalychnis callidryas)

Scientific classification
- Kingdom: Animalia
- Phylum: Chordata
- Class: Amphibia
- Order: Anura
- Family: Phyllomedusidae
- Genus: Agalychnis; Cope, 1864

Type species
- Agalychnis callidryas (Cope, 1862)

Synonyms
- Pachymedusa Duellman, 1968

= Agalychnis =

Genus of amphibians

Agalychnis is a genus of tree frogs native to forests in Mexico, Central America and northwestern South America. The genus consists of 14 species within the family Phyllomedusidae.

== Description ==
Agalychnis are slender frogs that have many different color combinations. As tree-dwelling amphibians, they primarily inhabit forest canopies. These frogs have webbed toes and adhesive pads at the tips of their digits. Their dorsal coloration ranges from light to dark green, with some species capable of changing color, such as Agalychnis lemur, which transitions from green during the day to reddish-brown or orange-tan at night. Ventral colors vary between yellow, white, or orange. Body length spans from 30mm to 88mm. They have long, slender limbs, a flattened body, and a rounded head with a short snout. Their eyes are large and protruding, and their skin can be smooth or slightly bumpy.

== Distribution and habitat ==
Agalychnis species are found in the Neotropical region, occupying habitats across Central America and northern South America.

These frogs live in tropical forests, particularly in tree canopies, restricting their range to regions with dense vegetation. They rely on the forest cover for protection from predators and suitable locations for egg-laying. During breeding periods, they gather around ponds to deposit their eggs. While they primarily remain in the trees, they occasionally descend for reproductive purposes.

== Taxonomy ==
Current research indicates Agalychnis is closely related to the genus Phyllomedusa. Previously, it was classified under the name Pachymedusa. The following species are recognised in the genus Agalychnis:

Image	Scientific name	Common name	Distribution
	Agalychnis annae (Duellman, 1963)	Blue-sided leaf frog	Costa Rica and Panama
	Agalychnis buckleyi (Boulenger, 1882)	Warty leaf frog	Colombia and Ecuador
	Agalychnis callidryas (Cope, 1862)	Red-eyed tree frog	Central America to Colombia
	Agalychnis dacnicolor (Cope, 1864)	Mexican leaf frog	Mexico
	Agalychnis danieli (Ruiz-Carranza, Hernández-Camacho, and Rueda-Almonacid, 1988)	Antioquia leaf frog	Colombia
	Agalychnis hulli (Duellman and Mendelson, 1995)	Cat-eyed frog	North-eastern Peru, possibly in nearby Ecuador
	Agalychnis lemur (Boulenger, 1882)	Lemur leaf frog	Costa Rica, Panama and northern Colombia
	Agalychnis medinae (Funkhouser, 1962)	Rancho Grande leaf frog	Venezuela
	Agalychnis moreletii (Duméril, 1853)	Morelet's tree frog	Belize, El Salvador, Guatemala, Honduras, and Mexico
	Agalychnis psilopygion (Cannatella, 1980)	Flecked tree frog	Southern Colombia and north-western Ecuador
	Agalychnis saltator Taylor, 1955	Misfit leaf frog	northeastern Honduras through Nicaragua to east-central Costa Rica
	Agalychnis spurrelli Boulenger, 1913	Gliding leaf frog	Colombia, Costa Rica, Ecuador, and Panama
	Agalychnis taylori Funkhouser, 1957		Belize, Guatemala, Honduras, and southern Mexico
	Agalychnis terranova Rivera-Correa, Duarte-Cubides, Rueda-Almonacid, and Daza-R., 2013		Colombia
