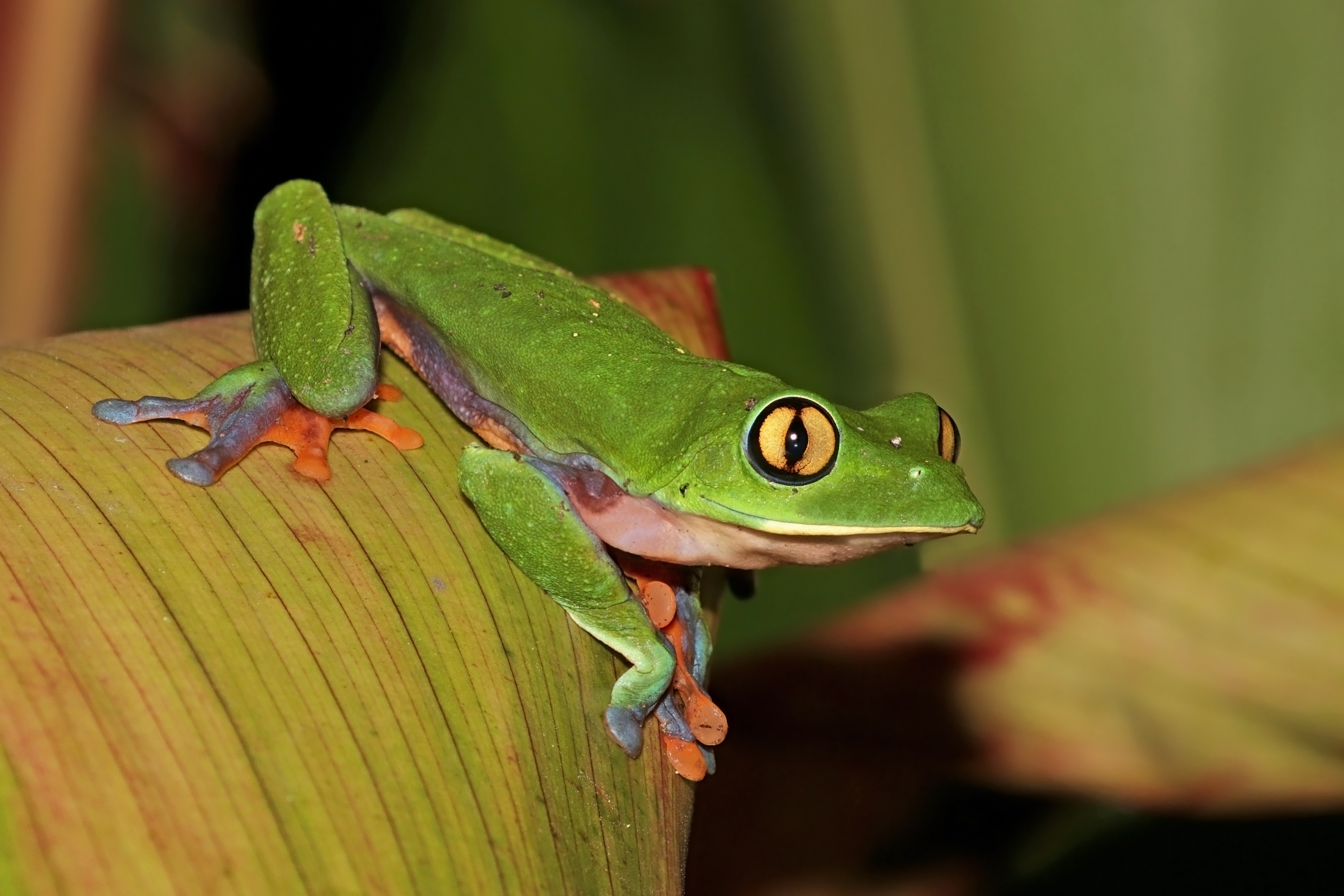
- In Heredia, Costa Rica

Conservation status
- Vulnerable (IUCN 3.1)
- CITES Appendix II

Scientific classification
- Kingdom: Animalia
- Phylum: Chordata
- Class: Amphibia
- Order: Anura
- Family: Phyllomedusidae
- Genus: Agalychnis
- Species: A. annae

Binomial name
- Agalychnis annae (Duellman, 1963)

Synonyms
- Phyllomedusa annae Duellman, 1963

= Blue-sided leaf frog =

Species of amphibian

The blue-sided leaf frog (Agalychnis annae), also known as the orange-eyed leaf frog, is a vulnerable species of tree frog in the subfamily Phyllomedusinae native to the tropical rainforests of Costa Rica and Panama. The specific name annae honors Ann S. Duellman, the collector of the holotype and the describer's wife.

== Distribution and habitat ==
This tree frog is known only from the Central Valley of Costa Rica, on the slopes of the Cordillera de Talamanca, the Cordillera de Tilarán and the Cordillera Central ranges, at altitudes between about 600 and 1,650 m (2,000 and 5,400 ft). The total extent of its range is estimated to be around 16,000 km^{2} (6,178 mi^{2}).

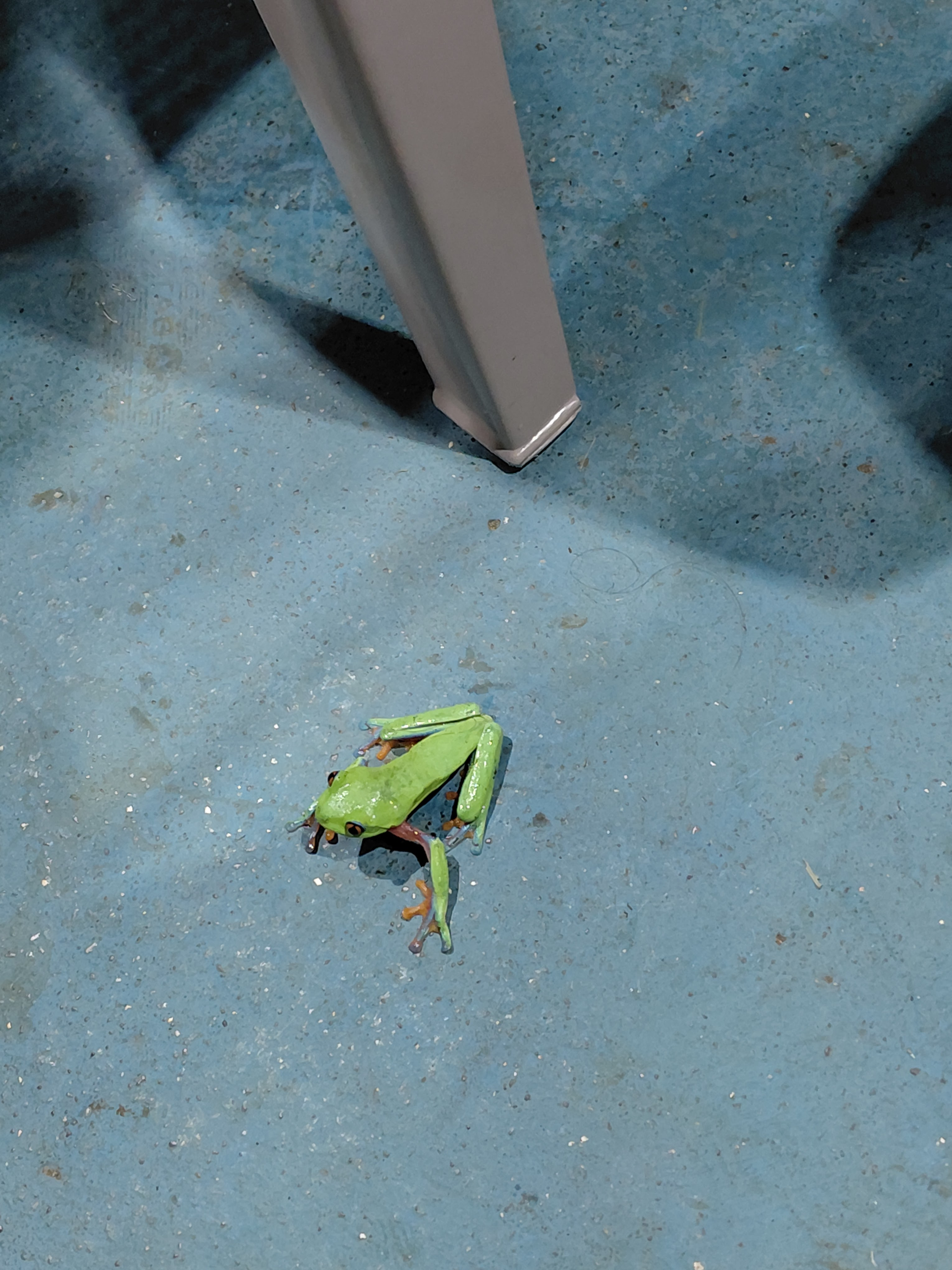
A specimen in Cartago, Costa Rica

There may be a subpopulation in the Cerro Colorado range in western Panama, as suggested by a single female being found there (2012). Much of the forest in which the frog lives has been cleared, so there are a number of subpopulations separated by coffee plantations, cultivated areas and urban areas.

== Status ==
Agalychnis annae is fairly common in parts of the Central Valley, but in other undisturbed forests, like those in the Tapantí National Park and the Monteverde Biological Reserve, after it disappeared from pristine areas in 1980, it became uncommon except in some places. Also, this includes protected areas such as Parque Nacional Tapantí and the Reserva Biológica Monteverde. The remnant sub-populations of this animal in Central Valley are being fragmented by urban development. This local extinction may be associated with climate change or with the fungus Batrachochytrium dendrobatidis which causes chytridiomycosis, a devastating disease among frog populations in Central America. Some individuals have tested positive for the fungus, yet the species persists in these localities. The IUCN has classified the frog as being a vulnerable species.
