= Agalychnis danieli =

Conservation status
- Data Deficient (IUCN 3.1)

Scientific classification
- Kingdom: Animalia
- Phylum: Chordata
- Class: Amphibia
- Order: Anura
- Family: Phyllomedusidae
- Genus: Agalychnis
- Species: A. danieli

Binomial name
- Agalychnis danieli (Ruiz-Carranza, Hernandez-Camacho, and Rueda-Almonacid, 1988)

Synonyms
- Phyllomedusa danieli Ruiz-Carranza, Hernández-Camacho, and Rueda-Almonacid, 1988; Hylomantis danieli (Ruiz-Carranza, Hernández-Camacho, and Rueda-Almonacid, 1988)

Species of frog

Agalychnis danieli, also known as the Antioquia leaf frog, is a species of frog in the subfamily Phyllomedusinae. It is endemic to Colombia and only known from its type locality in the northern part of the western flank of the Cordillera Occidental in the Antioquia Department. The specific name danieli honours Brother Daniel Gonzales Patiño, a Colombian monk with naturalist inclinations who became the director of Natural History Museum of the Instituto de La Salle, Bogotá.

Agalychnis danieli is only known from a juvenile specimen collected from a leaf on vegetation near a stream in primary forest at about 1,640 m (5,380 ft) above sea level. Later survey to the type locality did not reveal new specimens. The habitat of this species is threatened by clearing of the forest for fruit and cacao cultivation. It might occur in the adjacent Las Orquídeas National Natural Park and Mesenia-Paramillo Nature Reserve.
