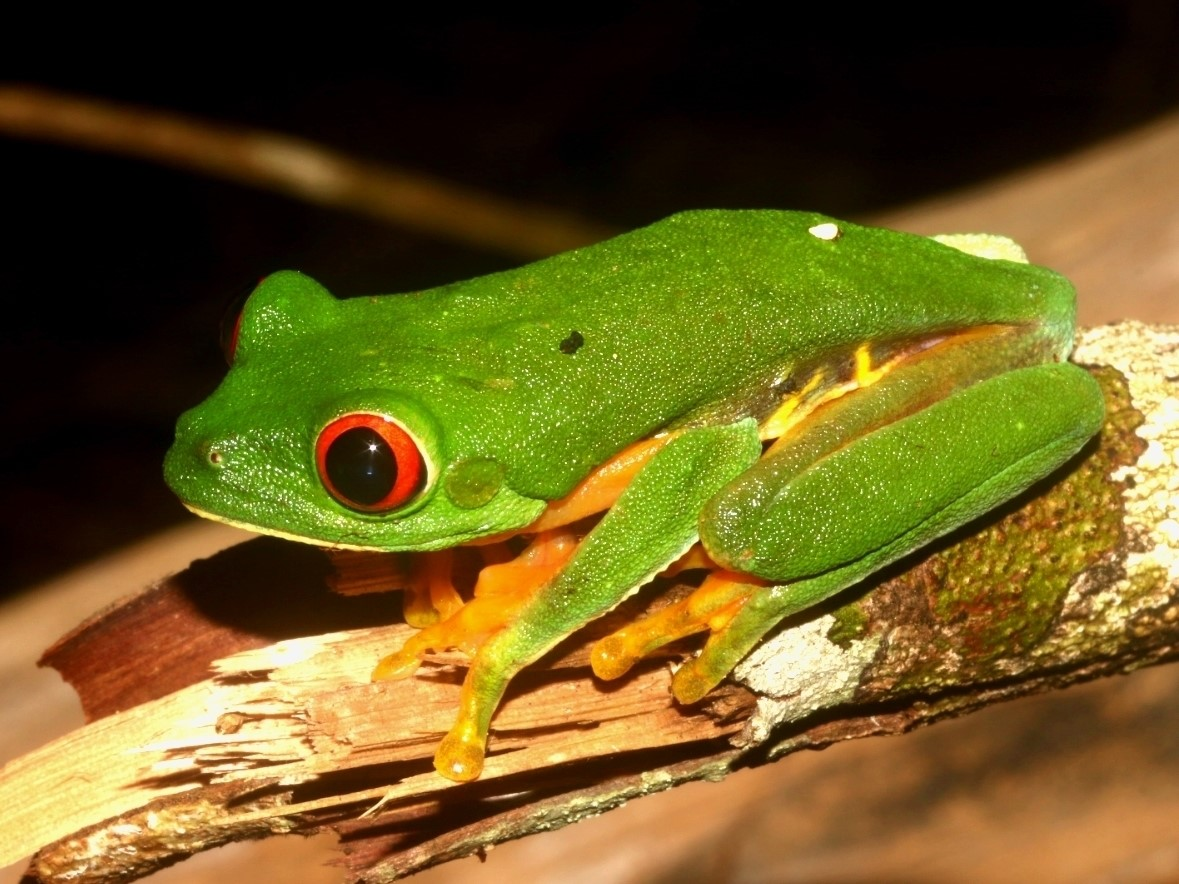
- In Quintana Roo, Mexico

Scientific classification
- Kingdom: Animalia
- Phylum: Chordata
- Class: Amphibia
- Order: Anura
- Family: Hylidae
- Genus: Agalychnis
- Species: A. taylori

Binomial name
- Agalychnis taylori Funkhouser, 1957

Synonyms
- Agalychnis callidryas taylori Funkhouser, 1957

= Agalychnis taylori =

Species of frog

Agalychnis taylori, commonly known as the red-eyed tree frog or Taylor's leaf frog, is a species of frog in the subfamily Phyllomedusinae. It was originally described as a subspecies of Agalychnis callidryas in 1957. In 1967 it was synonymized with Agalychnis callidryas by Savage and Heyer. In 2019, it was resurrected and elevated to a full species based on well-supported morphological data. The range of Agalychnis taylori extends from central Veracruz, Mexico, to west-central Honduras.

== Habitat ==
Agalychnis taylori appear in humid lowlands of in West-central Honduras, Guatemala, Belize, Oaxaca, and Southern Veracruz, Mexico. These organisms tend to flee to swamps during their mating season (wet seasons). During dry seasons they tend to inhabit canopy trees in primary forest.

== Reproduction ==
Agalychnis taylori's mating process includes the male wrestling with another male for the female. The last male standing will then latch onto the females back backwards. The female will then find a leaf to lay her eggs on one at a time while the male fertilizes it.

== Diet ==
Agalychnis taylori's diet consist of insects. These insects include Diptera, Caelifera, and mosquitoes of the Culicidae family. They capture and eat these insects at night. Their diet of insects help to prevent the overpopulation of mosquitoes and any other parasites.
