= Nordens Ark =

- Logo

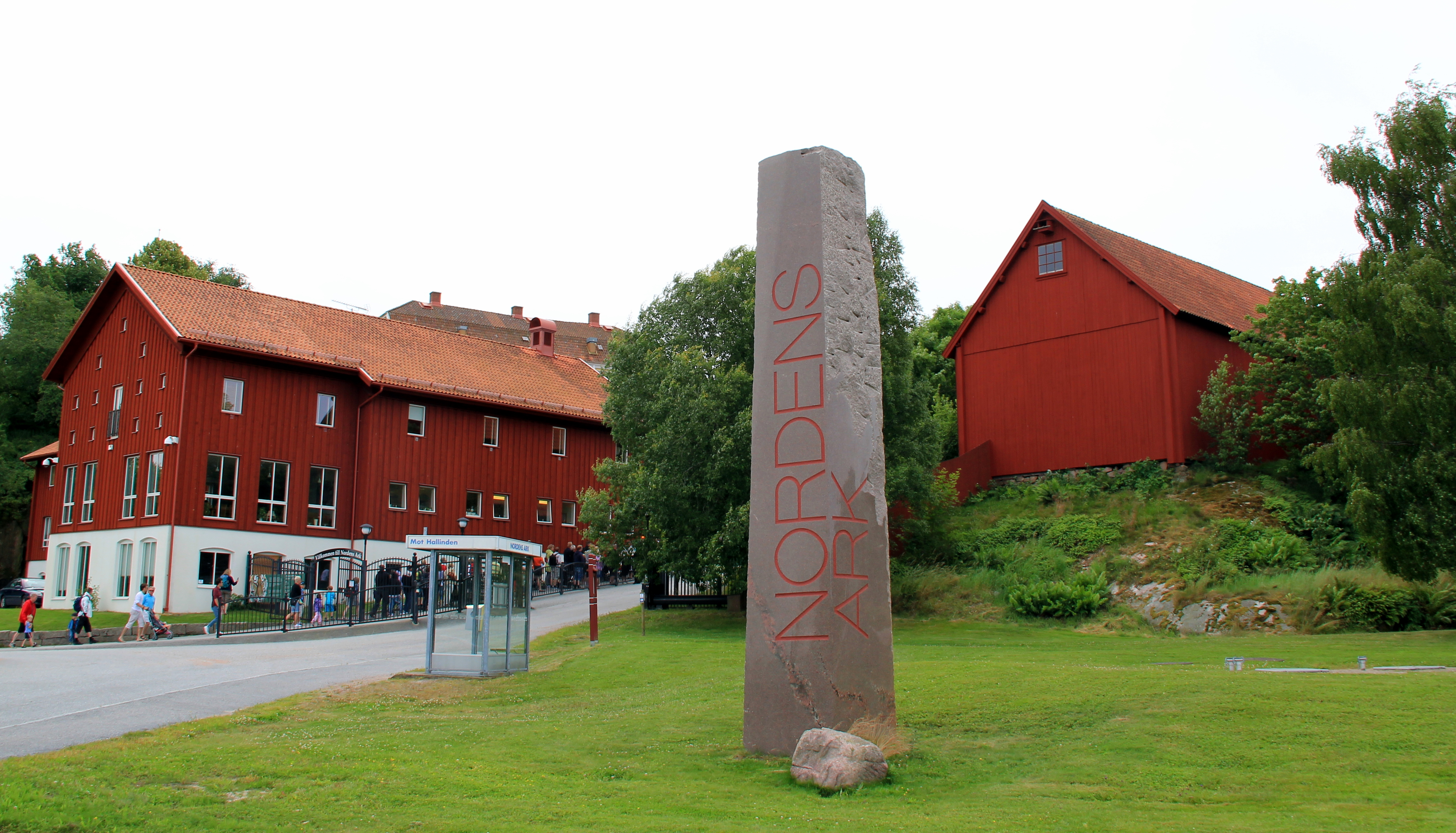
- Entrance
- Interactive map of Nordens Ark
- 58°26′28″N 11°26′06″E
- Date opened: 14 June 1989
- Location: Sotenäs Municipality, Västra Götaland County, Sweden
- Land area: 383 ha (950 acres)
- No. of species: 80
- Annual visitors: 100,000
- Memberships: EAZA, WAZA
- Website: en.nordensark.se

Nordens Ark (Ark of the North) is a zoo located on the 383-hectare (950-acre) Åby Manor in Bohuslän, Sweden. Nordens Ark was opened in 1989 and is operated by the Nordens Ark Foundation (Swedish: Stiftelsen Nordens Ark). Nordens Ark is on the west coast of Sweden, not far from the border with Norway. Victoria, Crown Princess of Sweden, was appointed as Nordens Ark Supreme Protector in 1989.

Nordens Ark has been a member of the European Association of Zoos and Aquaria (EAZA) since 1992 and the World Association of Zoos and Aquariums (WAZA) since 1994.

Nordens Ark is open to visitors every day of the year and receives around 100,000 visitors per annum.

== History ==
Historic letters show that King Håkon of Norway lived at Åby Manor in 1307, establishing that the manor is at least that old and making it one of Bohuslän's oldest estates. In 1661, Margareta Hvitfeldt purchased the property, consisting of some 90 farms and cottages. After her death in 1683, the property was managed until 1975 by the scholarship fund that inherited her wealth. The Agricultural Society in Gothenburg and Bohus County purchased the property at this time, and held it until 1996. The dwelling house at the manor was built in 1729, and parts of the 60-metre (200 ft) barn, the largest timbered structure in Bohuslän, are believed to date back to the 17th century.

The Bohus Breeding Center Foundation (Stiftelsen Bohus Avelscentrum) was founded on 8 March 1988 and Nordens Ark was inaugurated by Carl XVI Gustaf of Sweden on 14 June 1989. In 1996 the foundation purchased Åby Manor from Aby manor from the Agricultural Society in Gothenburg and Bohus County. In 1997, the name of the foundation was changed to the current Nordens Ark Foundation (Stiftelsen Nordens Ark), and in 1999 Nordens Ark created The Farm and opened to the public.

== Animals ==
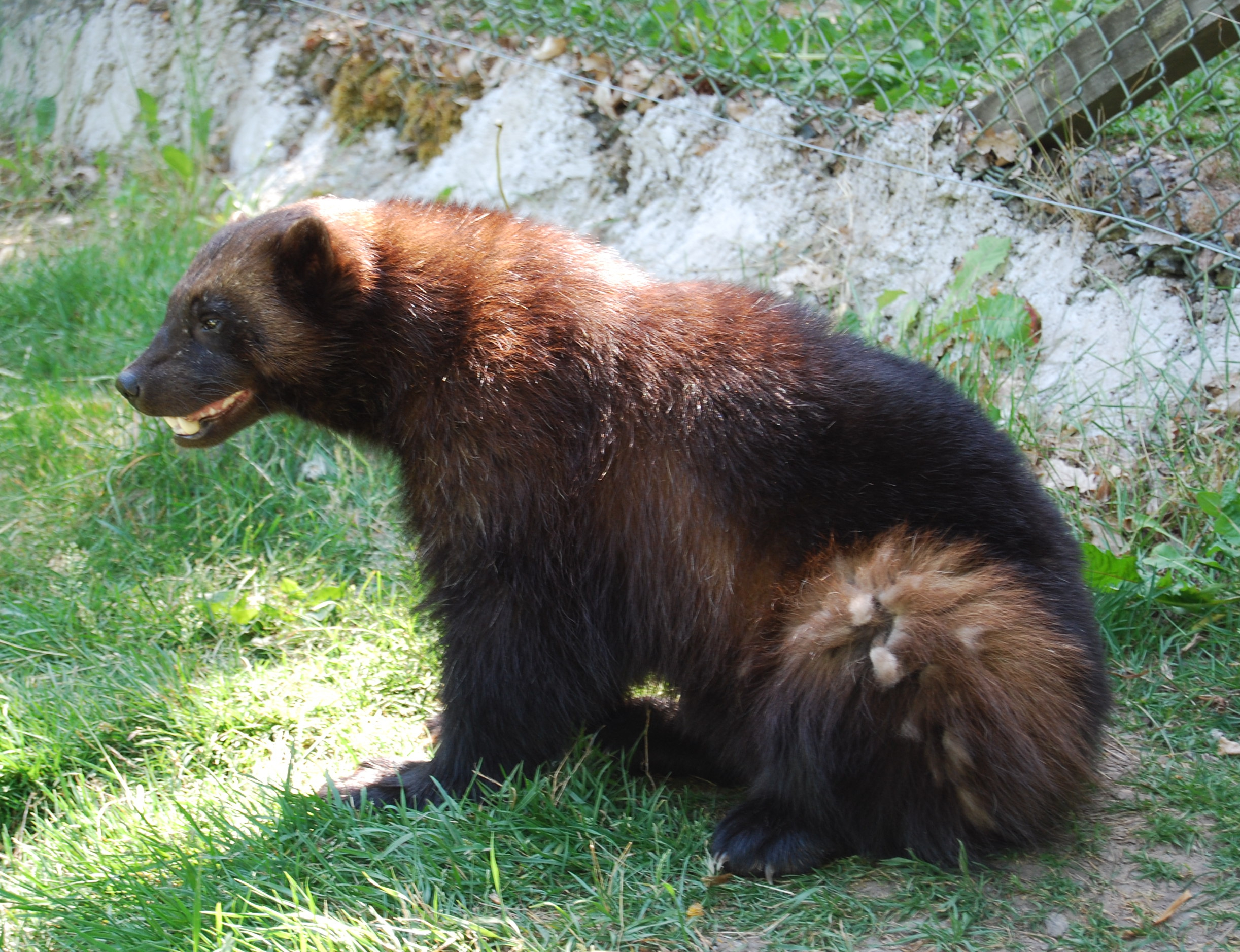
A wolverine at the park

The Farm (native breeds)
- Bohuslän-dal black poultry
- Dala sheep
- Mountain cattle
- Gotland rabbit
- Gotlandsruss
- Gute sheep
- Jämtland goat
- Linderöd pig
- The Nordic bee
- Nordsvensk horse
- Orust poultry
- Polled cattle
- Swedish blue duck
- Longwool sheep
- Öland goose
The wild zoo
- Amur leopard
- Amur tiger
- Eurasian eagle owl
- Bald ibis
- European wild cat
- Lesser white-fronted goose
- Snowy owl
- White-naped crane
- Red-crowned crane
- Wolverine
- Great grey owl
- Eurasian lynx
- Maned wolf
- Red panda
- Peregrine falcon
- Przewalski horse
- European forest reindeer
- Tadjiik markhor
- Ural owl
- Rocky mountain goat
- Snow leopard
- Pudu
- Tadjiikistan urial sheep
- Eurasian otter
- Grey wolf
- White-backed woodpecker
- White stork
Reptiles, amphibians, and invertebrates
- Giant marine toad
- Bamboo tree frog
- European pond tortoise
- Wels catfish
- Gotland grass snake
- Green toad
- Yellow-banded poison arrow frog
- Pool frog
- Smooth snake
- Adder
- Red-necked pond turtle
- European fire-bellied toad
- Agile frog
- Common toad
- Annam leaf turtle
- Moor frog
- Edible toad
- European tree frog
- Smooth newt
- Carvalho's Surinam toad
- Sand lizard
- Viviparous lizard
- Grass snake
- Natterjack toad
- Giant day gecko
- Great crested newt
- Common frog

== Quarantine and breeding ==
Quarantine and breeding take place in a separate part of the park called Lunden, which is not accessible to the public. This area includes separate quarantine areas for predators, birds, and ungulates.

There are three categories of breeding and rearing work at the park.

1. Endangered old Nordic breeds.
2. Endangered Nordic wild mammals, birds, amphibians, reptiles and insects.
3. Endangered exotic wild mammals, birds, amphibians, reptiles and insects that come from an environment similar to the Nordic. There are exceptions when it comes to amphibians and reptiles.

== Projects ==
Nordens Ark has participated or is currently taking part in re-population projects, to release animals born at the facility into the wild, including the white stork, eagle owl, bell frog, otter, European wildcat, and lynx.

The park has a national responsibility for rearing and reintroduction of the white-backed woodpecker, peregrine falcon, green toad, lesser white-fronted goose, and several species of beetle.

== Foundation ==
Nordens ark is owned and run by the Nordens Ark Foundation (Swedish: Stiftelsen Nordens Ark) which owns the 383-acre (155 ha) Åby Manor. This foundation is supported by gifts, donations, and commercial and private sponsors.
