= Little red frog =

Little red frog may refer to:

- Little red tree frog (Litoria rubella) a frog in the family Hylidae native to Australia and southern New Guinea
- Yapacana's little red frog (Minyobates steyermarki, formerly Dendrobates steyermarki), a frog in the family Dendrobatidae endemic to Cerro Yapacana in southern Venezuela
