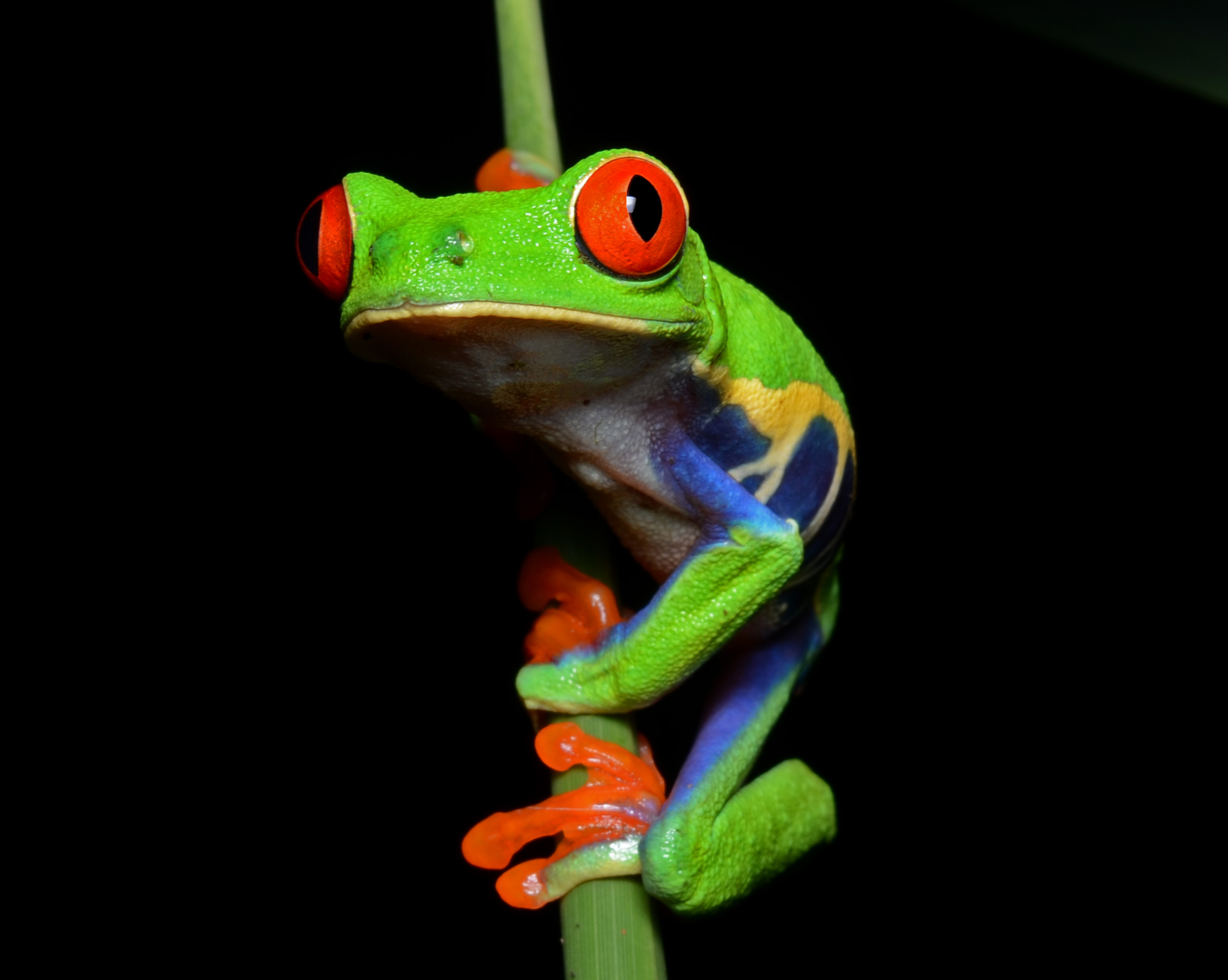
- Male in Costa Rica
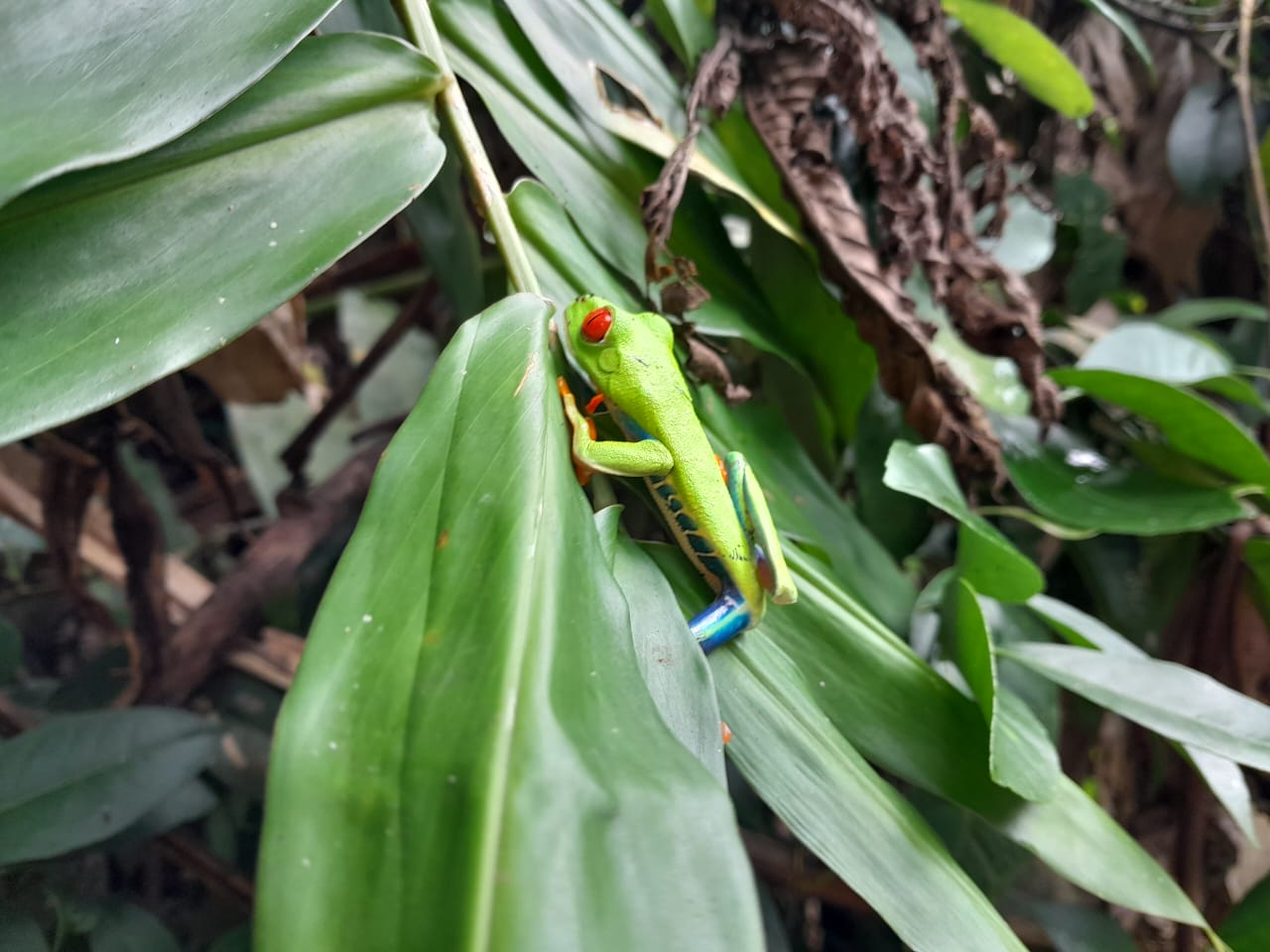
- Female

Conservation status
- Least Concern (IUCN 3.1)
- CITES Appendix II

Scientific classification
- Kingdom: Animalia
- Phylum: Chordata
- Class: Amphibia
- Order: Anura
- Family: Phyllomedusidae
- Genus: Agalychnis
- Species: A. callidryas

Binomial name
- Agalychnis callidryas (Cope, 1862)

Synonyms
- Agalychnis helenae Cope, 1885; Hyla callidryas Cope, 1862; Phyllomedusa callidryas (Cope, 1862); Phyllomedusa helenae (Cope, 1885)

= Agalychnis callidryas =

Red-eyed tree frog

Species of amphibian

The red-eyed tree frog or red-eyed leaf frog (Agalychnis callidryas) is a species of tree frog in the subfamily Phyllomedusinae native to forests of Central America and northwestern South America. One of the most recognizable frog species, A. callidryas is known for its vibrant coloration, having a bright green body with blue and yellow stripes on the side, a white underside, bright red- to orange-colored feet, and its namesake bright red eyes. Despite these bright colors, the red-eyed tree frog is not poisonous like many other brightly colored amphibians; rather, the colors likely provide camouflage against the greenery of the surrounding jungle, and may also serve to provoke the startle reflex to dissuade predators and allow the frog time to escape.

Like all the species in its genus, A. callidryas is arboreal, possessing long limbs and webbed toes, and is nocturnal, when it mostly hunts for insects. The males of this species are smaller than the females, and they display non-random mating patterns which suggest female choice for specific types of male. They mate and reproduce near ponds, and are therefore found in humid lowlands, especially tropical forests. The embryos of this species are able to respond to approaching predators by hatching early, dropping into the water to escape.

== Description ==
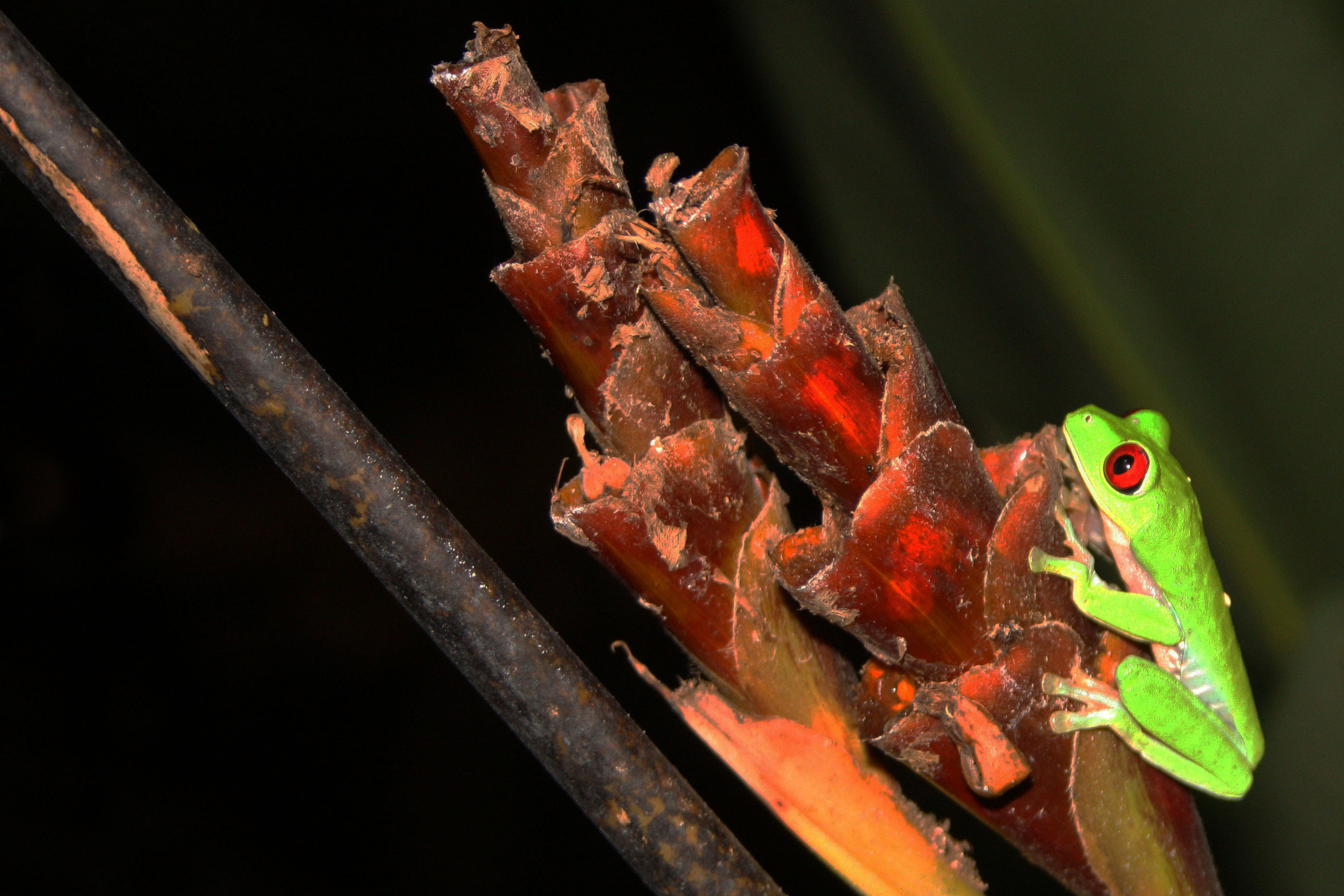
A specimen in Costa Rica

Agalychnis callidryas is an easily recognizable species due to its colorful appearance. In terms of size, males reach about 2 in (51 millimetres) while females grow to 3 in (76 millimetres) and are the larger of the two. The adults are distinctively colored, with bright green bodies, light blue or cream-colored bellies, and blue and yellow stripes along their sides. Their feet are bright orange and have suction cups which help them adhere to the bottom of leaves where they spend most of their time. Their skin is smooth with few to no bumps, which combined with their color helps the frogs blend into their leafy surroundings. Additionally, they have a gland that secretes mucus on the outermost layer of their skin to resist water loss and offer some defense against infections. They are named for their bright red slitted eyes, which do not have a true eyelid but rather a nictitating membrane that allows light to enter the eye even when closed so that they will awaken when predators are approaching.

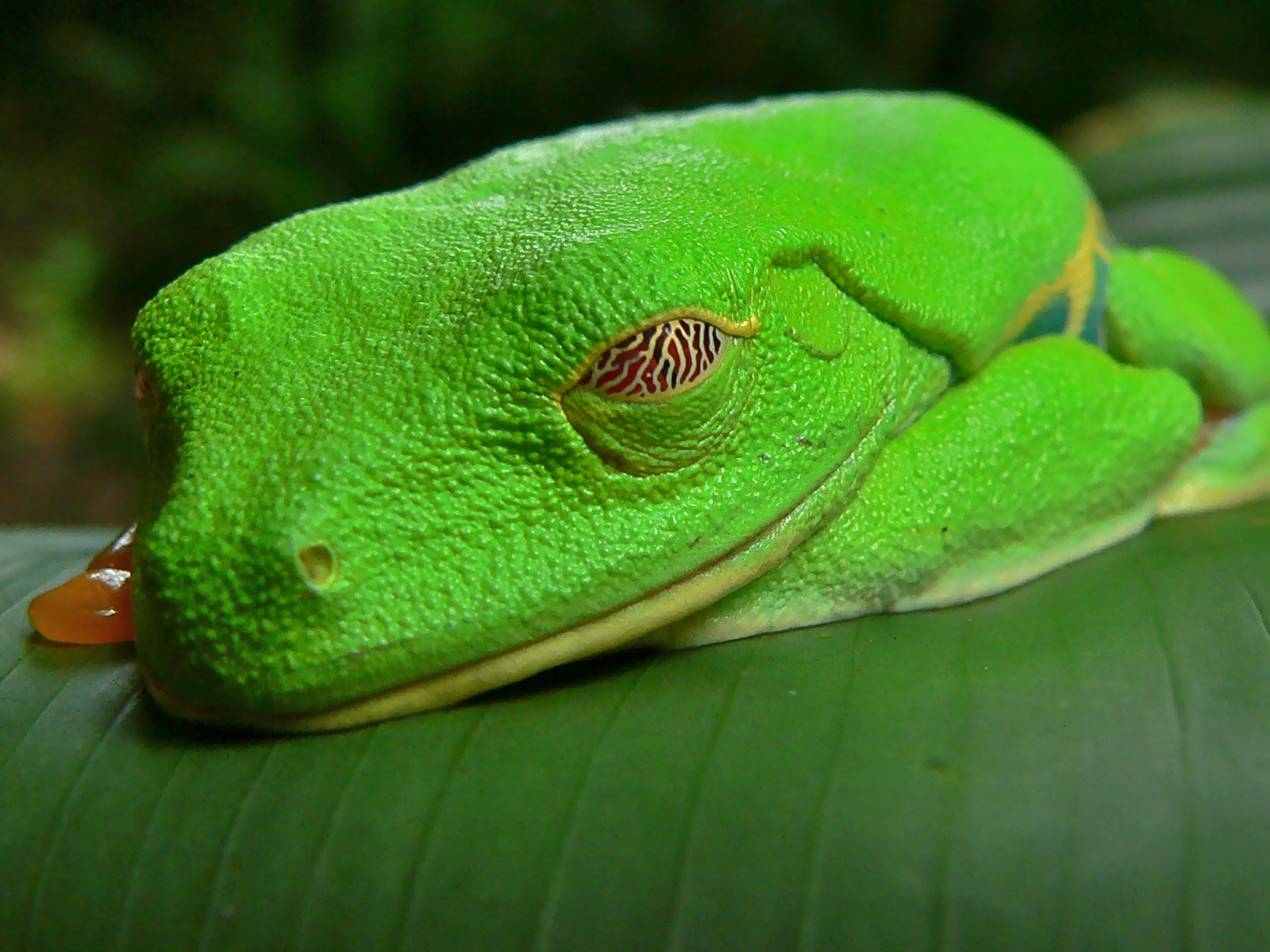
Image of the nictitating membrane seen in red-eyed tree frogs

The frog's colors are representative of "flash coloration", by which an organism displays certain colors at rest compared to when in motion. In this species' case, the frog's startling red eyes are hidden when its eyes are closed, allowing it to blend in with leaves. When the frog is startled, it can flash its bright red eyes, orange webbed feet, and blue and yellow lateral stripes, which all serve the purpose of startling predators and allowing the frog time to escape. Unlike the bright colors of some related amphibians, A. callidryas's colors do not convey toxicity through aposematism; rather, its colors may mimic those of the toxic species in a form of Batesian mimicry.

The skin of this species displays high reflectance in the near-infrared, unlike that of Hyla arborea.

=== Color morphs ===
Though the coloration of Agalychnis callidryas is broadly consistent throughout its range, there are some variations in morphs across the geographical range of the species: for example, the side stripes of Costa Rican and Panamanian populations include blue, blue/red, orange, and purple. There are several hypotheses about the reason for the existence of these color morphs. One hypothesis is that the existence of orange and purple morphs in Costa Rica is caused by isolation by distance (vicariance), because the orange and purple morphs were not genetically distinct groups. It is also possible that color patterns have been affected by different selective pressures, and that the existence of some morphs is due to genetic drift.

=== Synapomorphies ===
As a species of tree frog, Agalychnis callidryas has a claw-shaped terminal phalanx. Other synapomorphies of this genus include the presence of a red hue on the iris and a golden reticulated palpebral membrane.

== Distribution and habitat ==
Agalychnis callidryas is native to Central America, ranging from northeastern Honduras to northern Colombia.

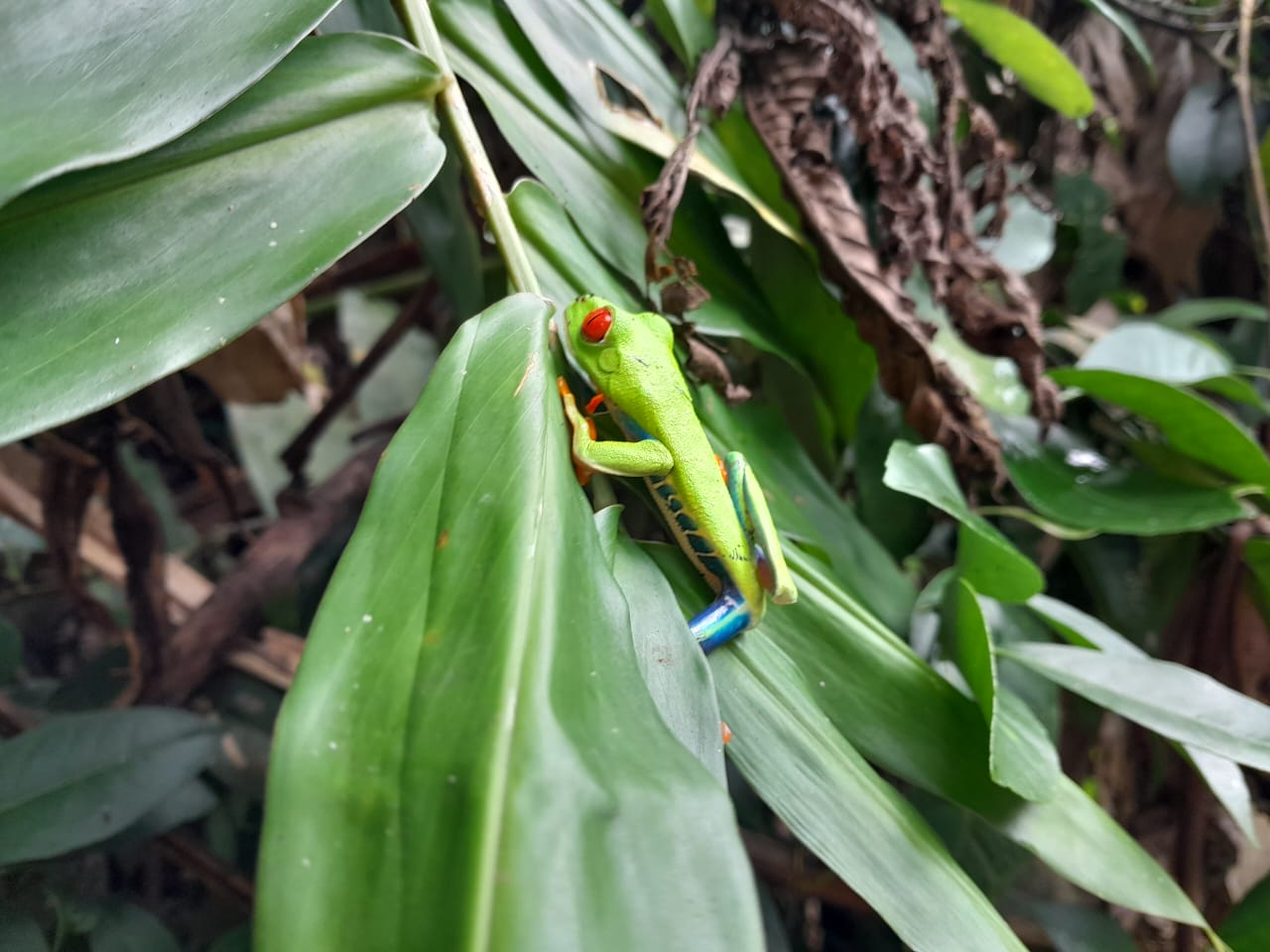
A red-eyed tree frog in Costa Rica

Its natural habitats include inland forests and wetlands, both tropical and mountainous areas where there is forest cover and water nearby. Ponds or bodies of water are essential for its reproduction so they are invariably found near these areas. The red-eyed tree frog is commonly found in tropical rainforests in the previously listed countries. The frog is primarily arboreal and prefers hiding in canopy cover amongst leaves. Agalychnis callidryas requires high humidity, usually at least 80 percent.

== Behaviour and ecology ==
Adult red-eyed tree frogs are primarily carnivores, eating moths, Orthopterans (crickets, katydids and grasshoppers), Dipterans (flies and mosquitoes), and other insects. Occasionally, they also eat smaller amphibians. Their tadpoles eat plants, algae, plankton, bacteria, carrion, and their fellow tadpoles. After metamorphosis, froglets begin consuming small insects like fruit flies and pinhead crickets.

A study on carotenoid consumption has shown they play an important role in development, phenotype, and fecundity in this species. There is a critical window after metamorphosis where carotenoids improve female growth rate and fecundity, and lead to a redder skin in both sexes. Carotenoids are important nutrients for wild red-eyed tree frogs and especially for captive red-eyed tree frogs, who sometimes suffer the degradation of skin pigmentation due to an inadequate diet.

=== Reproduction and life cycle ===
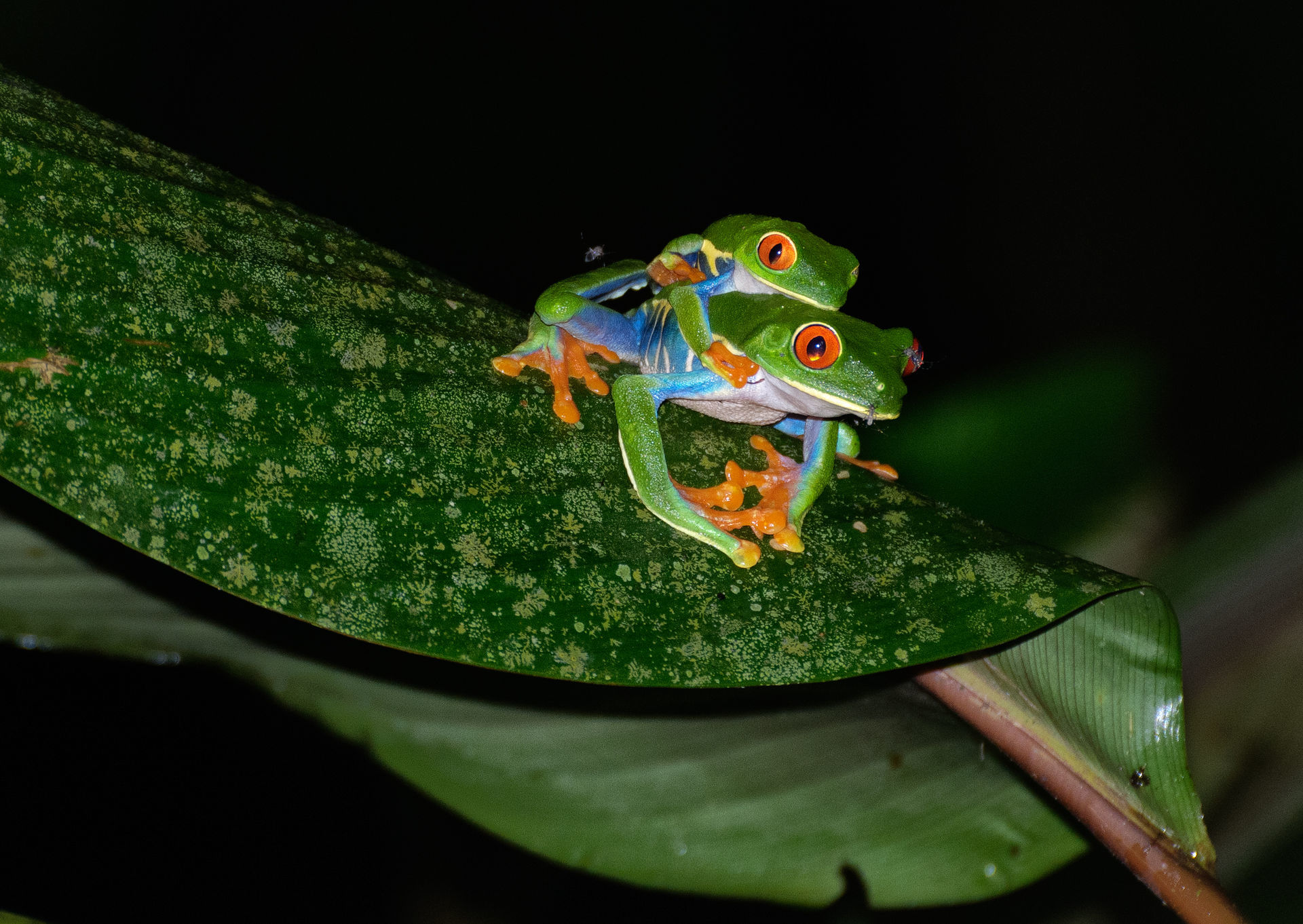
Red-eyed tree frogs in axillary amplexus

Red-eyed tree frogs mate seasonally, specifically in the rainy season during the months of October to March. Males attract females by croaking and wrestle with each other in male-male competition in order to gain access to females for reproduction. Females latch on to the underside of a leaf using the suction cup-like structures on their webbed feet, and the female must hold on to the leaf while males compete and wrestle nearby. The winning male and female will then participate in amplexus, where the male will grasp a female by the waist from behind. The female will lay eggs on the underside of the leaf as the male fertilizes them externally. The female chooses a leaf above a pond or large puddle on which to lay her clutch of roughly 40 eggs, and can lay multiple clutches in a single night. The eggs typically hatch within 6 to 8 days if left undisturbed, with some variation depending on geography and risk assessment through vibration. Eggs are usually laid on a leaf directly above or very close to a body of water, because tadpoles which hatch from the eggs will drop into the water from the leaf. Since oviposition generally occurs on both sides of the leaf, red-eyed tree frogs may fold the leaf to hide the eggs from predators. They also produce sticky jelly to glue the eggs together; this may protect the eggs from splitting and dehydration.

Red-eyed tree frog embryos use natural day and night cycles as signals for when to hatch, and tend to hatch just after nightfall. The eggs may also hatch early, exhibiting a form of developmental phenotypic plasticity, when predation or a change in the environment signals a threat to their survival. Dragonflies, fish, and water beetles prey on the tadpoles.

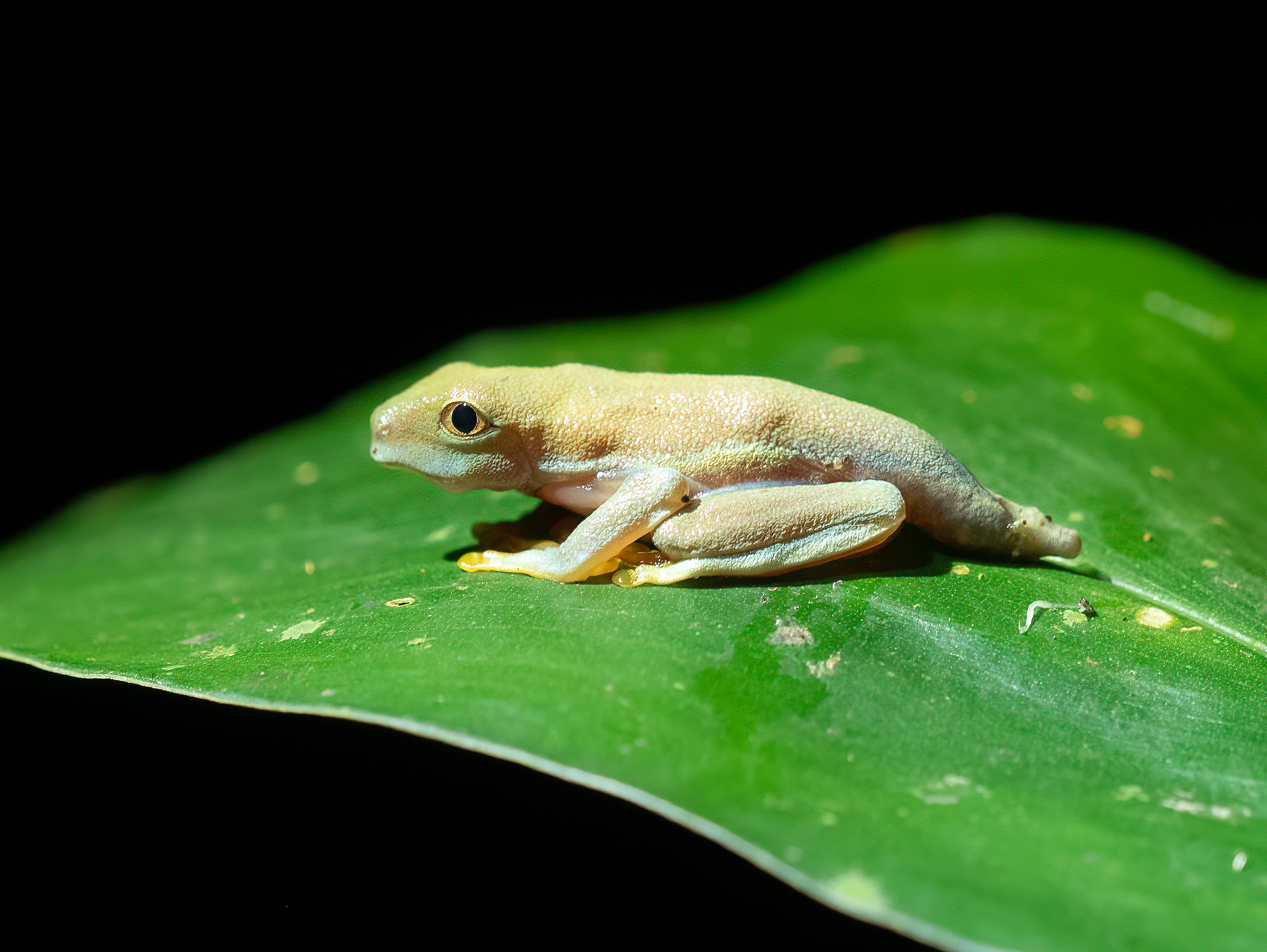
Red-eyed tree froglet in Costa Rica

Depending on environmental conditions, the newly hatched tadpoles will stay in the water for a few weeks or months before metamorphosing into adult frogs. The timing of metamorphosis depends on the duration of the larval stage, which varies with environmental factors. After metamorphosis, the color of the tadpoles' torsos changes from brown to green, and their eyes, which are initially yellow, turn into deep red without much side patterning. These changes mark maturity. The lifespan of red-eyed tree frogs is about five years in the wild.

==== Mating ====
Red-eyed tree frog females are typically choosy about which males they mate with. Females will choose mates based on visual and auditory cues, mainly the male frogs' croaking calls as well as their size and flank stripe. Females are likely to choose males with "local" flank stripes and call patterns, meaning that male frogs from nearby areas are preferentially selected for mating. Call and stripe patterns are considered simultaneously by females in this situation.

Size plays a role in mate choice for red-eyed tree frogs as well. Often larger males are more successful in amplexus compared to smaller males. However, size-assortative mating also plays a role, and larger females are more likely to pair with proportionally large males and vice versa for small females and males. This is so the male can successfully fertilize the female's eggs during amplexus.

During the mating season, the male frogs shake the branches where they are sitting to improve their chances of finding a mate by keeping rivals at bay. This is the first evidence that tree-dwelling vertebrates use vibration to communicate. When rainfall is at its highest, a male red-eyed tree frog calls "chack" to get the attention of the female. Females use the call as well as the color (specifically, the stripped sides) of the male frog in order to find a possible mate. Both the call and color of the male frog play a role in territorial displays and anti-predatory behavior. During amplexus, the female carries the male on her back for several hours during the oviposition process. Because the eggs are externally fertilized, there is still a risk of competition even after a female has selected a mate. There is no sperm priority in Agalychnis callidryas, and so a single clutch of eggs may be fertilized by multiple males.

==== Phenotypic plasticity ====
Red-eyed tree frog embryos exhibit phenotypic plasticity, hatching early in response to environmental disturbances to protect themselves. Though embryos are bred synchronously, they normally hatch 6 to 10 days after oviposition in the absence of any disturbance. However, a simultaneously early hatching in entire clutches is triggered when embryos are exposed to their predators or threatening environmental changes such as rainstorms or floods. Early hatching has also been linked to egg dehydration, with hatching occurring earlier in dry egg clutches than in wet ones.

Hatching early is an important defense against predators, but is also a risky strategy for embryos because early hatching increases predation risk to the tadpoles. Therefore, to maximize the benefits of this strategy, embryos must only hatch when they are truly at risk from predation. Studies show that this strategy is multifaceted and a specific combination of vibrational pulse duration and inter-pulse intervals is needed in order for embryos to exhibit this response. This combination of signals is thought to be specific to the embryo predators, thus ensuring the response only occurs when absolutely necessary to ensure survival.

Predators are the major cause of this response. Since these frogs usually lay eggs on both the upper and the undersides of leaves above ponds, clutches need to protect themselves against arboreal, aerial and aquatic predators. Red-eyed tree frog embryos face predation from several types of wasps (Polybia rejecta) and snakes (Leptodeira septentrionalis). Tadpoles are predated on by shrimp (Macrobrachium americanum) and large fish (Brachyrhaphis rhabdophora) in their environments. Froglets and adult frogs are predated on by aquatic spiders (Araneae), snakes (Leptodeira septentrionalis), birds, and bats. When predators are close enough to produce detectable vibration, the embryos assess disturbance. After a few seconds, embryos vigorously hatch out into tadpoles and spread out to escape. Since eggs are usually laid above ponds, the response improves survival because tadpoles often fall into water on hatching. Hatching direction also has implications for embryo survival and may be influenced by light. A study found that A. callidryas embryos hatch towards light, suggesting they use light and darkness as directional cues to determine hatching direction.

== Conservation ==
As of 2016, the red-eyed tree frog is classified as Least Concern by the International Union for Conservation of Nature (IUCN). Though many populations are decreasing, and though the species inhabits many areas vulnerable to deforestation, the classification of Least Concern stems from its general tolerance to habitat modification, a wide species distribution, and a presumably large captive population. Red-eyed tree frog husbandry, care, and breeding knowledge have been greatly improved upon in the 21st century. However, as with all frogs and toads, the species still faces challenges from chytrid fungus, logging, and residential development. Wild tadpoles have experienced die-offs due to ranavirus, and subpopulations in Costa Rica, Nicaragua and Panama are threatened by capture for the international pet trade.
